= 2025 Chennai Super Kings season =

Indian Premier League cricket team

Chennai Super Kings
2025 season
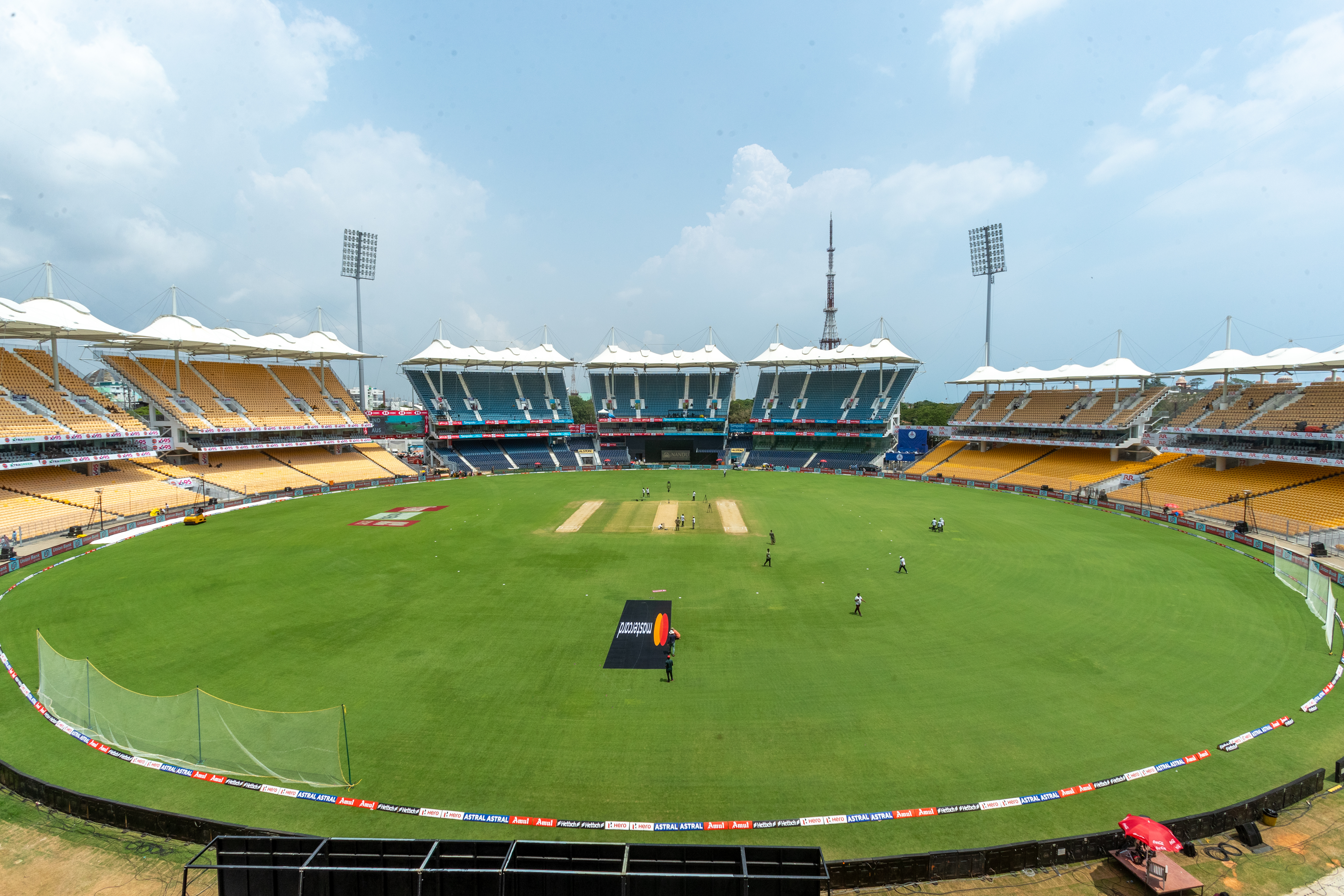
- M. A. Chidambaram Stadium, home ground of Chennai Super Kings
- Coach: Stephen Fleming
- Captain: Ruturaj Gaikwad; MS Dhoni
- Ground(s): M. A. Chidambaram Stadium, Chennai
- League stage: 10th place
- Most runs: Shivam Dube (357)
- Most wickets: Noor Ahmad (24)
- Most catches: Dewald Brevis; Ravindra Jadeja (6 each)
- Most wicket-keeping dismissals: MS Dhoni (11)

The 2025 season was the 16th season for the Indian Premier League (IPL) cricket franchise Chennai Super Kings. They were one of the ten teams that competed in the 2025 IPL. Mid-season, MS Dhoni took over as the captain after Ruturaj Gaikwad withdrew due to injury. The team was coached by Stephen Fleming.

Chennai Super Kings had a poor season and were the first team to be eliminated from the 2025 IPL. The team lost five matches at home in a season for the first time and finished the season in last place (tenth) with four wins from 14 matches. Shivam Dube scored the most runs (357) while Noor Ahmad took the most wickets (24) for Chennai in the 2025 season.

== Pre-season ==
The 2025 Indian Premier League was the 18th edition of the Indian Premier League (IPL), a professional Twenty20 (T20) cricket league, organised by the Board of Control for Cricket in India (BCCI). Chennai Super Kings are the joint-most successful franchise with 5 title wins. The team finished in fifth place in the previous season. The tournament featured ten teams competing in 74 matches from 22 March to 3 June 2025. Chennai played all their home matches at M. A. Chidambaram Stadium, except for the last one, which was moved to Arun Jaitley Cricket Stadium following the IPL's suspension and rescheduling.

=== Player retention ===
Franchises were allowed to retain a maximum of six players from their squad, including a maximum of five recent international players. Franchises were required to submit their retention lists before 31 October 2024. Chennai retained five players, including captain Ruturaj Gaikwad and former captains MS Dhoni and Ravindra Jadeja.

Retained players
No.	Player	Salary
1	Ruturaj Gaikwad	₹18 crore (US$1.9 million)
2	Ravindra Jadeja	₹18 crore (US$1.9 million)
3	Matheesha Pathirana	₹13 crore (US$1.3 million)
4	Shivam Dube	₹12 crore (US$1.2 million)
5	MS Dhoni	₹4 crore (US$420,000)

Released players
Batters	Wicket-keepers	All-rounders	Fast bowlers	Spin bowlers
Ajinkya Rahane; Sameer Rizvi; Shaik Rasheed	Aravelly Avanish Rao; Devon Conway	Ajay Mandal; Daryl Mitchell; Mitchell Santner; Moeen Ali; Nishant Sindhu; Rachin Ravindra; Rajvardhan Hangargekar	Deepak Chahar; Mukesh Choudhary; Mustafizur Rahman; Richard Gleeson; Shardul Thakur; Simarjeet Singh; Tushar Deshpande	Maheesh Theekshana; Prashant Solanki

=== Auction ===
The season's auction took place on 24 and 25 November 2024 in Jeddah, Saudi Arabia. The auction purse for each franchise was set at ₹120 crore (US$12 million), with the franchises being deducted an amount from the purse for each retained player. Chennai had a purse remaining of ₹55 crore (US$5.7 million). Franchises that did not retain six players, were allowed Right-to-Match (RTM) cards at the auction for each player not retained. Chennai had one card available. Chennai bought twenty players in the auction, including ten capped players and six overseas players. Chennai used their RTM card to buy back Rachin Ravindra for ₹4 crore (US$420,000).

== Squad ==
- Players with international caps as of start of 2025 IPL are listed in **bold**.
- Ages are as of 22 March 2025.
- Withdrawn players are indicated by a dagger symbol (†) and placed at the bottom of the table.

Chennai Super Kings squad for the 2025 Indian Premier League
S/N	Name	Nationality	Birth date	Batting style	Bowling style	Salary	Notes
1	Ramakrishna Ghosh	India	28 August 1997 (aged 27)	Right-handed	Right-arm fast-medium	₹30 lakh (US$31,000)	
7	**MS Dhoni**	India	7 July 1981 (aged 43)	Right-handed	Right-arm medium	₹4 crore (US$420,000)	Captain (Note: MS Dhoni took over as the captain after Ruturaj Gaikwad withdrew due to elbow injury.)
8	**Ravindra Jadeja**	India	6 December 1988 (aged 36)	Left-handed	Left-arm orthodox	₹18 crore (US$1.9 million)	
10	**Jamie Overton**	England	10 April 1994 (aged 30)	Right-handed	Right-arm fast	₹1.5 crore (US$160,000)	Overseas
12	**Dewald Brevis**	South Africa	29 April 2003 (aged 21)	Right-handed	Right-arm leg spin	₹2.2 crore (US$230,000)	Overseas; replacement (Note: Dewald Brevis replaced Gurjapneet Singh, after the latter withdrew due to injury.)
15	**Noor Ahmad**	Afghanistan	3 January 2005 (aged 20)	Right-handed	Left-arm wrist-spin	₹10 crore (US$1.0 million)	Overseas
17	**Rachin Ravindra**	New Zealand	18 November 1999 (aged 25)	Left-handed	Left-arm slow orthodox	₹4 crore (US$420,000)	Overseas
19	Shreyas Gopal	India	4 September 1993 (aged 31)	Right-handed	Right-arm leg spin	₹30 lakh (US$31,000)	
25	**Shivam Dube**	India	26 June 1993 (aged 31)	Left-handed	Right-arm medium	₹12 crore (US$1.2 million)	
27	Urvil Patel	India	17 October 1998 (aged 26)	Right-handed	—N/a	₹30 lakh (US$31,000)	Replacement (Note: Urvil Patel replaced Vansh Bedi, after the latter withdrew due to ankle injury.)
28	Andre Siddarth	India	28 August 2006 (aged 18)	Right-handed	—N/a	₹30 lakh (US$31,000)	
33	Mukesh Choudhary	India	6 July 1996 (aged 28)	Left-handed	Left-arm fast-medium	₹30 lakh (US$31,000)	
47	Anshul Kamboj	India	6 December 2000 (aged 24)	Right-handed	Right-arm fast-medium	₹3.4 crore (US$350,000)	
51	**Kamlesh Nagarkoti**	India	28 December 1999 (aged 25)	Right-handed	Right-arm fast	₹30 lakh (US$31,000)	
52	**Rahul Tripathi**	India	2 March 1991 (aged 34)	Right-handed	Right-arm medium	₹3.4 crore (US$350,000)	
56	Ayush Mhatre	India	16 July 2007 (aged 17)	Right-handed	Right-arm off break	₹30 lakh (US$31,000)	Replacement (Note: Ayush Mhatre replaced Ruturaj Gaikwad, after the latter withdrew due to elbow injury.)
57	**Deepak Hooda**	India	19 April 1995 (aged 29)	Right-handed	Right-arm off break	₹1.7 crore (US$180,000)	
58	**Sam Curran**	England	3 June 1998 (aged 26)	Left-handed	Left-arm fast-medium	₹2.4 crore (US$250,000)	Overseas
59	**Vijay Shankar**	India	26 January 1991 (aged 34)	Right-handed	Right-arm medium	₹1.2 crore (US$120,000)	
66	Shaik Rasheed	India	24 September 2004 (aged 20)	Right-handed	Right-arm leg spin	₹30 lakh (US$31,000)	
71	**Khaleel Ahmed**	India	5 December 1997 (aged 27)	Right-handed	Left-arm fast-medium	₹4.8 crore (US$500,000)	
72	**Nathan Ellis**	Australia	22 September 1994 (aged 30)	Right-handed	Right-arm fast-medium	₹2 crore (US$210,000)	Overseas
81	**Matheesha Pathirana**	Sri Lanka	18 December 2002 (aged 22)	Right-handed	Right-arm fast	₹13 crore (US$1.3 million)	Overseas
88	**Devon Conway**	New Zealand	8 July 1991 (aged 33)	Left-handed	Right-arm medium	₹6.25 crore (US$650,000)	Overseas
99	**Ravichandran Ashwin**	India	17 September 1986 (aged 38)	Right-handed	Right-arm off break	₹9.75 crore (US$1.0 million)	
9	Gurjapneet Singh †	India	8 November 1998 (aged 26)	Right-handed	Left-arm fast-medium	₹2.2 crore (US$230,000)	Withdrawn
23	Vansh Bedi †	India	23 December 2002 (aged 22)	Right-handed	—N/a	₹55 lakh (US$57,000)	Withdrawn
31	**Ruturaj Gaikwad** †	India	31 January 1997 (aged 28)	Right-handed	Right-arm off break	₹18 crore (US$1.9 million)	Captain; withdrawn

== Support staff ==
In September 2024, it was announced that Chennai's bowling coach, Dwayne Bravo, would join Kolkata Knight Riders in a mentorship role.

Position	Name
Head coach	Stephen Fleming
Batting coach	Michael Hussey
Bowling coach	Eric Simons
Fielding coach	Rajiv Kumar

- Source: Wisden

== League stage ==
Chennai Super Kings began their season with a win against Mumbai Indians. They lost their next five mathces against Royal Challengers Bengaluru, Rajasthan Royals, Delhi Capitals, Punjab Kings and Kolkata. On 10 April, Gaikwad withdrew from the season due to injury, and Dhoni took over as the captain. Chennai won their seventh match against Lucknow Super Giants; but lost their next four matches against Mumbai, Sunrisers Hyderabad, Punjab and Bengaluru; and became the first team to be eliminated from the 2025 IPL. Chennai lost five home venue matches in a season for the first time, and was eliminated in the league stage in two consecutive seasons for the first time since the inauguration of the IPL. They won the next match against Kolkata, lost to Rajasthan and won their last match of the season against Gujarat Titans. Chennai finished at the bottom of the points table for the first time in an IPL season with eight points.

=== Points table ===
League stage standings
Pos	Grp	Team	Pld	W	L	NR	Pts	NRR	Qualification
1	A	Punjab Kings	14	9	4	1	19	0.372	Advance to Qualifier 1
2	A	Royal Challengers Bengaluru	14	9	4	1	19	0.301	Advance to Qualifier 1
3	B	Gujarat Titans	14	9	5	0	18	0.254	Advance to Eliminator
4	B	Mumbai Indians	14	8	6	0	16	1.142	Advance to Eliminator
5	B	Delhi Capitals	14	7	6	1	15	−0.011	Eliminated
6	B	Sunrisers Hyderabad	14	6	7	1	13	−0.241	Eliminated
7	B	Lucknow Super Giants	14	6	8	0	12	−0.376	Eliminated
8	A	Kolkata Knight Riders	14	5	7	2	12	−0.305	Eliminated
9	A	Rajasthan Royals	14	4	10	0	8	−0.549	Eliminated
10	A	Chennai Super Kings	14	4	10	0	8	−0.647	Eliminated

Source: ESPNcricinfo

=== League progression ===
League progression
Team	Group matches														Playoffs		
Team	1	2	3	4	5	6	7	8	9	10	11	12	13	14	Q1/E	Q2	F
Chennai Super Kings	2	2	2	2	2	2	4	4	4	4	4	6	6	8			

Win	Loss	No result

- Note: The total points at the end of each group match are listed.
- Note: Click on the points (group matches) or W/L (playoffs) to see the match summary.

=== Fixtures ===
Match 3
23 March 2025
19:30 (N)
Scorecard

Mumbai Indians; 155/9 (20 overs)	v	Chennai Super Kings (H); 158/6 (19.1 overs)
Tilak Varma 31 (25); Noor Ahmad 4/18 (4 overs)		Rachin Ravindra 65* (45); Vignesh Puthur 3/32 (4 overs)

Chennai Super Kings won by 4 wickets
M. A. Chidambaram Stadium, Chennai
Umpires: K. N. Ananthapadmanabhan (Ind) and Saiyed Khalid (Ind)
Player of the match: Noor Ahmad (Chennai Super Kings)

- Chennai Super Kings won the toss and elected to field.
- Vignesh Puthur (Mumbai Indians) made his T20 debut.
- Ryan Rickelton (Mumbai Indians) made his IPL debut.

Match 8
28 March 2025
19:30 (N)
Scorecard

Royal Challengers Bengaluru; 196/7 (20 overs)	v	Chennai Super Kings (H); 146/8 (20 overs)
Rajat Patidar 51 (32); Noor Ahmad 3/36 (4 overs)		Rachin Ravindra 41 (31); Josh Hazlewood 3/21 (4 overs)

Royal Challengers Bengaluru won by 50 runs
M. A. Chidambaram Stadium, Chennai
Umpires: Saiyed Khalid (Ind) and Nitin Menon (Ind)
Player of the match: Rajat Patidar (Royal Challengers Bengaluru)

- Chennai Super Kings won the toss and elected to field.

Match 11
30 March 2025
19:30 (N)
Scorecard

Rajasthan Royals (H); 182/9 (20 overs)	v	Chennai Super Kings; 176/6 (20 overs)
Nitish Rana 81 (36); Noor Ahmad 2/28 (4 overs); Matheesha Pathirana 2/28 (4 overs)		Ruturaj Gaikwad 63 (44); Wanindu Hasaranga 4/35 (4 overs)

Rajasthan Royals won by 6 runs
ACA Cricket Stadium, Guwahati
Umpires: Adrian Holdstock (SA) and Akshay Totre (Ind)
Player of the match: Nitish Rana (Rajasthan Royals)

- Chennai Super Kings won the toss and elected to field.

Match 17
5 April 2025
15:30 (D/N)
Scorecard

Delhi Capitals; 183/6 (20 overs)	v	Chennai Super Kings (H); 158/5 (20 overs)
KL Rahul 77 (51); Khaleel Ahmed 2/25 (4 overs)		Vijay Shankar 69* (54); Vipraj Nigam 2/27 (4 overs)

Delhi Capitals won by 25 runs
M. A. Chidambaram Stadium, Chennai
Umpires: Abhijeet Bengeri (Ind) and Parashar Joshi (Ind)
Player of the match: KL Rahul (Delhi Capitals)

- Delhi Capitals won the toss and elected to bat.

Match 22
8 April 2025
19:30 (N)
Scorecard

Punjab Kings (H); 219/6 (20 overs)	v	Chennai Super Kings; 201/5 (20 overs)
Priyansh Arya 103 (42); Khaleel Ahmed 2/45 (4 overs)		Devon Conway 69 (49); Lockie Ferguson 2/40 (4 overs)

Punjab Kings won by 18 runs
Maharaja Yadavindra Singh International Cricket Stadium, Mullanpur
Umpires: Abhijit Bhattacharya (Ind) and Ulhas Gandhe (Ind)
Player of the match: Priyansh Arya (Punjab Kings)

- Punjab Kings won the toss and elected to bat.

Match 25
11 April 2025
19:30 (N)
Scorecard

Chennai Super Kings (H); 103/9 (20 overs)	v	Kolkata Knight Riders; 107/2 (10.1 overs)
Shivam Dube 31* (29); Sunil Narine 3/13 (4 overs)		Sunil Narine 44 (18); Noor Ahmad 1/8 (2 overs)

Kolkata Knight Riders won by 8 wickets
M. A. Chidambaram Stadium, Chennai
Umpires: Chris Gaffaney (NZ) and Parashar Joshi (Ind)
Player of the match: Sunil Narine (Kolkata Knight Riders)

- Kolkata Knight Riders won the toss and elected to field.

Match 30
14 April 2025
19:30 (N)
Scorecard

Lucknow Super Giants (H); 166/7 (20 overs)	v	Chennai Super Kings; 168/5 (19.3 overs)
Rishabh Pant 63 (49); Ravindra Jadeja 2/24 (3 overs)		Shivam Dube 43* (37); Ravi Bishnoi 2/18 (3 overs)

Chennai Super Kings won by 5 wickets
Ekana Cricket Stadium, Lucknow
Umpires: Ulhas Gandhe (Ind) and Virender Sharma (Ind)
Player of the match: MS Dhoni (Chennai Super Kings)

- Chennai Super Kings won the toss and elected to field.
- Shaik Rasheed (Chennai Super Kings) made his IPL debut.

Match 38
20 April 2025
19:30 (N)
Scorecard

Chennai Super Kings; 176/5 (20 overs)	v	Mumbai Indians (H); 177/1 (15.4 overs)
Ravindra Jadeja 53* (35); Jasprit Bumrah 2/25 (4 overs)		Rohit Sharma 76* (45); Ravindra Jadeja 1/28 (3 overs)

Mumbai Indians won by 9 wickets
Wankhede Stadium, Mumbai
Umpires: Abhijit Bhattacharya (Ind) and Virender Sharma (Ind)
Player of the match: Rohit Sharma (Mumbai Indians)

- Mumbai Indians won the toss and elected to field.
- Ayush Mhatre (Chennai Super Kings) made his T20 debut.

Match 43
25 April 2025
19:30 (N)
Scorecard

Chennai Super Kings (H); 154 (19.5 overs)	v	Sunrisers Hyderabad; 155/5 (18.4 overs)
Dewald Brevis 42 (25); Harshal Patel 4/28 (4 overs)		Ishan Kishan 44 (34); Noor Ahmad 2/42 (4 overs)

Sunrisers Hyderabad won by 5 wickets
M. A. Chidambaram Stadium, Chennai
Umpires: Mohit Krishnadas (Ind) and Nitin Menon (Ind)
Player of the match: Harshal Patel (Sunrisers Hyderabad)

- Sunrisers Hyderabad won the toss and elected to field.

Match 49
30 April 2025
19:30 (N)
Scorecard

Chennai Super Kings (H); 190 (19.2 overs)	v	Punjab Kings; 194/6 (19.4 overs)
Sam Curran 88 (47); Yuzvendra Chahal 4/32 (3 overs)		Shreyas Iyer 72 (41); Khaleel Ahmed 2/28 (3.4 overs)

Punjab Kings won by 4 wickets
M. A. Chidambaram Stadium, Chennai
Umpires: Anish Sahasrabudhe (Ind) and Akshay Totre (Ind)
Player of the match: Shreyas Iyer (Punjab Kings)

- Punjab Kings won the toss and elected to field.
- Yuzvendra Chahal (Punjab Kings) took his second hat-trick in IPL.
- Chennai Super Kings were eliminated as a result of this match.

Match 52
3 May 2025
19:30 (N)
Scorecard

Royal Challengers Bengaluru (H); 213/5 (20 overs)	v	Chennai Super Kings; 211/5 (20 overs)
Virat Kohli 62 (33); Matheesha Pathirana 3/36 (4 overs)		Ayush Mhatre 94 (48); Lungi Ngidi 3/30 (4 overs)

Royal Challengers Bengaluru won by 2 runs
M. Chinnaswamy Stadium, Bengaluru
Umpires: Mohit Krishnadas (Ind) and Nitin Menon (Ind)
Player of the match: Romario Shepherd (Royal Challengers Bengaluru)

- Chennai Super Kings won the toss and elected to field.

Match 57
7 May 2025
19:30 (N)
Scorecard

Kolkata Knight Riders (H); 179/6 (20 overs)	v	Chennai Super Kings; 183/8 (19.4 overs)
Ajinkya Rahane 48 (33); Noor Ahmad 4/31 (4 overs)		Dewald Brevis 52 (25); Vaibhav Arora 3/48 (3 overs)

Chennai Super Kings won by 2 wickets
Eden Gardens, Kolkata
Umpires: Adrian Holdstock (SA) and Anish Sahasrabudhe (Ind)
Player of the match: Noor Ahmad (Chennai Super Kings)

- Kolkata Knight Riders won the toss and elected to bat.
- Urvil Patel (Chennai Super Kings) made his IPL debut.

Match 62
20 May 2025
19:30 (N)
Scorecard

Chennai Super Kings (H); 187/8 (20 overs)	v	Rajasthan Royals; 188/4 (17.1 overs)
Ayush Mhatre 43 (20); Akash Madhwal 3/29 (4 overs)		Vaibhav Sooryavanshi 57 (33); Ravichandran Ashwin 2/41 (4 overs)

Rajasthan Royals won by 6 wickets
Arun Jaitley Stadium, Delhi
Umpires: Keyur Kelkar (Ind) and Rohan Pandit (Ind)
Player of the match: Akash Madhwal (Rajasthan Royals)

- Rajasthan Royals won the toss and elected to field.
- This match was originally scheduled for 12 May at the M. A. Chidambaram Stadium, before being rescheduled.

Match 67
25 May 2025
15:30 (D/N)
Scorecard

Chennai Super Kings; 230/5 (20 overs)	v	Gujarat Titans (H); 147 (18.3 overs)
Dewald Brevis 57 (23); Prasidh Krishna 2/22 (4 overs)		Sai Sudharsan 41 (28); Anshul Kamboj 3/13 (2.3 overs)

Chennai Super Kings won by 83 runs
Narendra Modi Stadium, Ahmedabad
Umpires: K. N. Ananthapadmanabhan (Ind) and Kaushik Gandhi (Ind)
Player of the match: Dewald Brevis (Chennai Super Kings)

- Chennai Super Kings won the toss and elected to bat.
- This match was originally scheduled for 18 May at the same venue, before being rescheduled.

== Statistics ==
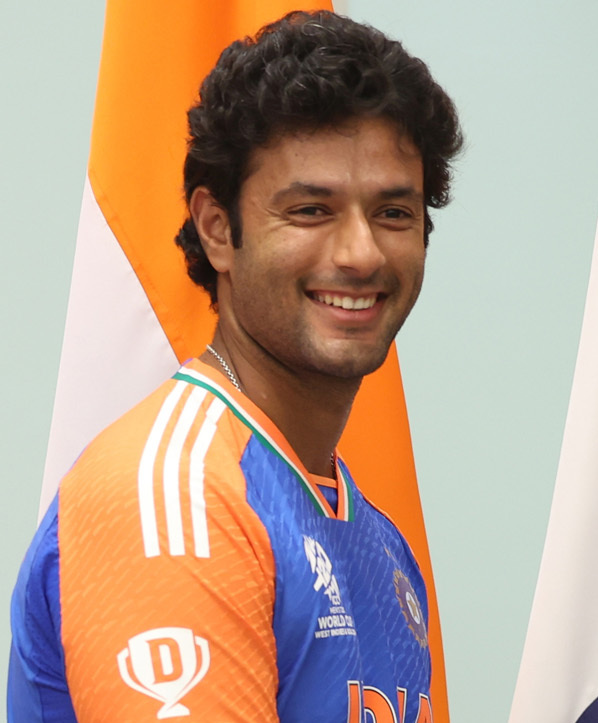
Shivam Dube scored the most runs (357) for Chennai Super Kings in the 2025 Indian Premier League.

At the IPL end of season awards, Chennai was awarded the team fairplay award.

Most runs
Runs	Player
357	Shivam Dube
301	Ravindra Jadeja
240	Ayush Mhatre
225	Dewald Brevis
196	MS Dhoni

Most wickets
Wickets	Player
24	Noor Ahmad
15	Khaleel Ahmed
13	Matheesha Pathirana
10	Ravindra Jadeja
8	Anshul Kamboj
