= 2025 Indian Premier League =

Twenty20 cricket tournament

- Tournament logo
- Dates: 22 March – 3 June 2025
- Administrator: Board of Control for Cricket in India
- Cricket format: Twenty20
- Tournament format(s): Group stage and playoffs
- Champions: Royal Challengers Bengaluru (1st title)
- Runners-up: Punjab Kings
- Participants: 10
- Matches: 74
- Most valuable player: Suryakumar Yadav (Mumbai Indians)
- Most runs: Sai Sudharsan (Gujarat Titans) (759)
- Most wickets: Prasidh Krishna (Gujarat Titans) (25)
- Official website: iplt20.com

The 2025 Indian Premier League, also known as IPL 18 and branded as TATA IPL 2025, was the 18th edition of the Indian Premier League, a professional Twenty20 cricket league. The tournament featured 10 teams competing in 74 matches. It began on 22 March and was held across 13 venues before being suspended on 9 May due to the 2025 India–Pakistan crisis. The matches resumed from 17 May across six venues, with the final rescheduled from 25 May to 3 June.

The defending champions Kolkata Knight Riders were eliminated in the league stage. In the final, Royal Challengers Bengaluru defeated Punjab Kings by 6 runs to win their maiden title after 18 years. Sai Sudharsan and Prasidh Krishna of Gujarat Titans scored the most runs (759) and took the most wickets (25). Suryakumar Yadav of Mumbai Indians was named as the most valuable player of the tournament.

== Background ==
The Indian Premier League (IPL) is a professional Twenty20 (T20) cricket league, organised by the Board of Control for Cricket in India (BCCI). It is held annually since the first edition in 2008. Kolkata Knight Riders were the defending champions, having won their third title in the previous season after defeating Sunrisers Hyderabad in the final.

=== Format ===
Each team played twice against the teams in their group and the team in the same row in the other group, and once against the remaining four teams in the other group. After the group stage, the top four teams, based on aggregate points, would advance to the playoffs. In this stage, the top two teams compete with each other (in a match titled "Qualifier 1"), as does the remaining two teams (in a match titled "Eliminator"). While the winner of Qualifier 1 would directly qualify for the final match, the losing team had another chance to qualify for the final match by competing against the winning team of the Eliminator (in a match titled "Qualifier 2"). The winner of this subsequent Qualifier 2 match advanced to the final match.

The IPL Governing Council decided to keep the number of matches to 74 for this edition as it was in the previous three seasons to help the cricketers balance their workload; however, it will be increased to 84 from 2026 onwards with the return of the double round-robin format.

Group A	Group B
Chennai Super Kings	Mumbai Indians
Kolkata Knight Riders	Sunrisers Hyderabad
Rajasthan Royals	Gujarat Titans
Royal Challengers Bengaluru	Delhi Capitals
Punjab Kings	Lucknow Super Giants

==== Rule changes ====
It was announced that the IPL will follow the International Cricket Council's (ICC) Code of Conduct regulations used for Twenty20 International (T20I) matches from 2025 onwards. The IPL had previously used its own Code of Conduct.

=== Schedule ===
According to ESPNcricinfo, the dates of the tournament window for the three seasons between 2025 and 2027 were sent to franchises ahead of the 2025 auction. In November 2024, the tentative dates for the three seasons were announced, with the 2025 edition set to take place from 14 March to 25 May. In January 2025, it was announced that the 2025 season would commence on 21 March to allow for a two-week gap after the 2025 ICC Champions Trophy final scheduled to take place on 9 March. This led to a clash with the 2025 Pakistan Super League taking place from 11 April to 25 May 2025, which was moved from its typical February–March window for the same reason.

The first two matches were confirmed by the BCCI on 13 February 2025, with the inaugural match being hosted at the Eden Gardens between the defending champions Kolkata Knight Riders and Royal Challengers Bengaluru on 22 March. The complete fixtures were announced on 16 February. It was announced that both Qualifier 1 and Eliminator would be played at the Rajiv Gandhi International Cricket Stadium on 20 and 21 May, and that Qualifier 2 and final would be played at the Eden Gardens on 23 and 25 May, with the venue to host its third IPL final after 2013 and 2015.

==== Suspension and rescheduling ====
On 9 May 2025, the remaining matches were suspended due to the 2025 India–Pakistan crisis. The revised schedule was announced on 12 May, with the remaining matches resumed on 17 May and were held across six venues. On 20 May the playoff fixtures were confirmed with Qualifier 1 and Eliminator played in Maharaja Yadavindra Singh International Cricket Stadium on 29 and 30 May, and Qualifier 2 and final played at Narendra Modi Stadium on 1 and 3 June, with the venue hosting its third final after 2022 and 2023. The final was played on 3 June, just a week before the 2025 World Test Championship final scheduled for 11 June.

=== Marketing ===
The Tata Group renewed their contract as the title sponsors of the IPL for a tenure of 5 years (2024–28) for ₹2,500 crore (US$270 million). The advertising campaign for the 2025 IPL consisted of 20 sponsors and 105 advertisers including – Dream11, Tata Motors, AngelOne, RuPay, CEAT and Wonder Cement.

=== Broadcasting ===
Disney Star's Star Sports and Viacom18's JioCinema had initially acquired the satellite and digital broadcasting rights for the 2023–2027 IPL cycle respectively. In November 2024, the two companies merged to form JioStar. In February 2025, JioCinema and Disney+ Hotstar merged to form JioHotstar, which now holds the domestic digital broadcasting rights for the remainder of the 2023–2027 cycle. In the opening weekend of three matches, Star Sports reported 253 million viewership, with a 39% increase in the average television viewership rating compared to last season, while JioHotstar reported 1.37 billion viewership, a 40% increase from last season. The final match reported a record-breaking 169 million viewership.

== Teams ==
The same 10 teams from the previous season competed.

Group	Team	2024 performance	Head coach	Captain
A	Chennai Super Kings	5th	Stephen Fleming	MS Dhoni (Note: Ruturaj Gaikwad withdrew from the season after the first five games and MS Dhoni replaced him as the captain.)
A	Kolkata Knight Riders	Champions	Chandrakant Pandit	Ajinkya Rahane
A	Punjab Kings	9th	Ricky Ponting	Shreyas Iyer
A	Rajasthan Royals	3rd	Rahul Dravid	Sanju Samson (Note: Riyan Parag captained Rajasthan Royals for the first 3 games, and in later games when Sanju Samson was unavailable.)
A	Royal Challengers Bengaluru	4th	Andy Flower	Rajat Patidar (Note: Jitesh Sharma captained Royal Challengers Bengaluru against Sunrisers Hyderabad when Rajat Patidar was unavailable.)
B	Delhi Capitals	6th	Hemang Badani	Axar Patel (Note: Faf du Plessis captained Delhi Capitals against Mumbai Indians when Axar Patel was unavailable.)
B	Gujarat Titans	8th	Ashish Nehra	Shubman Gill
B	Lucknow Super Giants	7th	Justin Langer	Rishabh Pant
B	Mumbai Indians	10th	Mahela Jayawardene	Hardik Pandya (Note: Suryakumar Yadav captained Mumbai Indians for the first match against Chennai Super Kings as Hardik Pandya was banned for slow over-rate in their last league stage game in 2024.)
B	Sunrisers Hyderabad	Runners-up	Daniel Vettori	Pat Cummins

=== Personnel changes ===
The franchises were required to submit their retention lists before 31 October 2024 and a total of 46 players were retained ahead of the auction. The auction was scheduled on 24 and 25 November 2024 in Jeddah, Saudi Arabia with the auction purse for each franchise set at ₹120 crore (US$13 million), highest in the history of IPL. A total of 1,574 players registered for the auction, of which 574 players were shortlisted to feature in the auction and 182 were sold in the auction. Rishabh Pant became the most expensive player in the history of IPL when he was bought by Lucknow Super Giants for ₹27 crore (US$2.9 million), surpassing ₹26.75 crore (US$2.9 million) paid by Punjab Kings for Shreyas Iyer earlier in the same auction, and ₹24.75 crore (US$2.6 million) paid by Kolkata Knight Riders for Mitchell Starc in the 2024 auction. Vaibhav Sooryavanshi became the youngest player sold in the IPL history at the age of 13 years, being bought by Rajasthan Royals for ₹1.1 crore (US$120,000).

Following the suspension and rescheduling, it was announced that the franchises would be allowed to sign temporary replacement players in place of unavailable players as the rescheduled fixtures clashed with the international cricket calendar, notably West Indies tour of Ireland, West Indies tour of England and the World Test Championship final. These temporary replacement players would not be available for retention in the 2026 auction.

== Venues ==
The league stage was played at 13 stadiums across India. The opening match was played at the Eden Gardens. The HPCA Cricket Stadium hosted one Punjab Kings home match, the ACA Cricket Stadium hosted two Rajasthan Royals matches, and the ACA–VDCA Cricket Stadium hosted two Delhi Capitals matches. The first two matches of the playoffs were originally scheduled to be played in the Rajiv Gandhi Cricket Stadium, with the Eden Gardens scheduled to host the final two matches. However, following the suspension and rescheduling, the remaining league stage matches were played across six venues, with the playoffs in Maharaja Yadavindra Singh Stadium and Narendra Modi Stadium.

† denotes venues for the rescheduled matches.

Ahmedabad †	Bengaluru †	Chennai	Delhi †	Dharamshala
Gujarat Titans	Royal Challengers Bengaluru	Chennai Super Kings	Delhi Capitals	Punjab Kings
Narendra Modi Stadium	M. Chinnaswamy Stadium	M. A. Chidambaram Stadium	Arun Jaitley Stadium	HPCA Cricket Stadium
Capacity: 132,000	Capacity: 40,000	Capacity: 39,000	Capacity: 35,200	Capacity: 21,200
Narendra Modi Stadium in 2023	M. Chinnaswamy Stadium in 2017	M. A. Chidambaram Stadium in 2023	Arun Jaitley Stadium in 2023	HPCA Cricket Stadium in 2015
Guwahati	A map of India with pin-points on 2025 Indian Premier League venues			Hyderabad
Rajasthan Royals	A map of India with pin-points on 2025 Indian Premier League venues			Sunrisers Hyderabad
ACA Cricket Stadium	A map of India with pin-points on 2025 Indian Premier League venues			Rajiv Gandhi Stadium
Capacity: 46,000	A map of India with pin-points on 2025 Indian Premier League venues			Capacity: 55,000
ACA Cricket Stadium in 2018	A map of India with pin-points on 2025 Indian Premier League venues			Rajiv Gandhi Stadium in 2024
Jaipur †	A map of India with pin-points on 2025 Indian Premier League venues			Kolkata
Rajasthan Royals	A map of India with pin-points on 2025 Indian Premier League venues			Kolkata Knight Riders
Sawai Mansingh Stadium	A map of India with pin-points on 2025 Indian Premier League venues			Eden Gardens
Capacity: 30,000	A map of India with pin-points on 2025 Indian Premier League venues			Capacity: 68,000
Sawai Mansingh Stadium in 2013	A map of India with pin-points on 2025 Indian Premier League venues			Eden Gardens in 2023
Lucknow †	Mullanpur †	Mumbai †	Visakhapatnam	
Lucknow Super Giants	Punjab Kings	Mumbai Indians	Delhi Capitals	
Ekana Cricket Stadium	Maharaja Yadavindra Singh Stadium	Wankhede Stadium	ACA–VDCA Cricket Stadium	
Capacity: 50,000	Capacity: 38,000	Capacity: 33,108	Capacity: 27,500	
Ekana Cricket Stadium in 2018		Wankhede Stadium in 2011	ACA–VDCA Cricket Stadium in 2016	

== League stage ==
=== Points table ===
League stage standings
Pos	Grp	Team	Pld	W	L	NR	Pts	NRR	Qualification
1	A	Punjab Kings	14	9	4	1	19	0.372	Advance to Qualifier 1
2	A	Royal Challengers Bengaluru	14	9	4	1	19	0.301	Advance to Qualifier 1
3	B	Gujarat Titans	14	9	5	0	18	0.254	Advance to Eliminator
4	B	Mumbai Indians	14	8	6	0	16	1.142	Advance to Eliminator
5	B	Delhi Capitals	14	7	6	1	15	−0.011	Eliminated
6	B	Sunrisers Hyderabad	14	6	7	1	13	−0.241	Eliminated
7	B	Lucknow Super Giants	14	6	8	0	12	−0.376	Eliminated
8	A	Kolkata Knight Riders	14	5	7	2	12	−0.305	Eliminated
9	A	Rajasthan Royals	14	4	10	0	8	−0.549	Eliminated
10	A	Chennai Super Kings	14	4	10	0	8	−0.647	Eliminated

Source: ESPNcricinfo

=== Match summary ===
Team	Group matches														Playoffs			
Team	1	2	3	4	5	6	7	8	9	10	11	12	13	14	Q1	E	Q2	F
Chennai Super Kings	2	2	2	2	2	2	4	4	4	4	4	6	6	8				
Delhi Capitals	2	4	6	8	8	10	10	12	12	12	13	13	13	15				
Gujarat Titans	0	2	4	6	8	8	10	12	12	14	16	18	18	18		L		
Kolkata Knight Riders	0	2	2	4	4	6	6	6	7	9	11	11	12	12				
Lucknow Super Giants	0	2	2	4	6	8	8	10	10	10	10	10	12	12				
Mumbai Indians	0	0	2	2	2	4	6	8	10	12	14	14	16	16		W	L	
Punjab Kings	2	4	4	6	6	8	10	10	11	13	15	17	17	19	L		W	L
Rajasthan Royals	0	0	2	4	4	4	4	4	4	6	6	6	6	8				
Royal Challengers Bengaluru	2	4	4	6	6	8	8	10	12	14	16	17	17	19	W			W
Sunrisers Hyderabad	2	2	2	2	2	4	4	4	6	6	7	9	11	13				

Win	Loss	No result

- Note: The total points at the end of each group match are listed.
- Note: Click on the points (group matches) or W/L (playoffs) to see the match summary.

Visitor team →	CSK	DC	GT	KKR	LSG	MI	PBKS	RR	RCB	SRH
Home team ↓	CSK	DC	GT	KKR	LSG	MI	PBKS	RR	RCB	SRH
Chennai Super Kings		Delhi; 25 runs		Kolkata; 8 wickets		Chennai; 4 wickets	Punjab; 4 wickets	Rajasthan; 6 wickets	Bengaluru; 50 runs	Hyderabad; 5 wickets
Delhi Capitals			Gujarat; 10 wickets	Kolkata; 14 runs	Delhi; 1 wicket	Mumbai; 12 runs		Delhi; Super Over	Bengaluru; 6 wickets	Delhi; 7 wickets
Gujarat Titans	Chennai; 83 runs	Gujarat; 7 wickets			Lucknow; 33 runs	Gujarat; 36 runs	Punjab; 11 runs	Gujarat; 58 runs		Gujarat; 38 runs
Kolkata Knight Riders	Chennai; 2 wickets		Gujarat; 39 runs		Lucknow; 4 runs		Match abandoned	Kolkata; 1 run	Bengaluru; 7 wickets	Kolkata; 80 runs
Lucknow Super Giants	Chennai; 5 wickets	Delhi; 8 wickets	Lucknow; 6 wickets			Lucknow; 12 runs	Punjab; 8 wickets		Bengaluru; 6 wickets	Hyderabad; 6 wickets
Mumbai Indians	Mumbai; 9 wickets	Mumbai; 59 runs	Gujarat; 3 wickets (DLS)	Mumbai; 8 wickets	Mumbai; 54 runs				Bengaluru; 12 runs	Mumbai; 4 wickets
Punjab Kings	Punjab; 18 runs	Delhi; 6 wickets		Punjab; 16 runs	Punjab; 37 runs	Punjab; 7 wickets		Rajasthan; 50 runs	Bengaluru; 7 wickets	
Rajasthan Royals	Rajasthan; 6 runs		Rajasthan; 8 wickets	Kolkata; 8 wickets	Lucknow; 2 runs	Mumbai; 100 runs	Punjab; 10 runs		Bengaluru; 9 wickets	
Royal Challengers Bengaluru	Bengaluru; 2 runs	Delhi; 6 wickets	Gujarat; 8 wickets	Match abandoned			Punjab; 5 wickets	Bengaluru; 11 runs		Hyderabad; 42 runs
Sunrisers Hyderabad		Match abandoned	Gujarat; 7 wickets	Hyderabad; 110 runs	Lucknow; 5 wickets	Mumbai; 7 wickets	Hyderabad; 8 wickets	Hyderabad; 44 runs		

Home team won	Visitor team won

- Note: Results listed are according to the home (horizontal) and visitor (vertical) teams.
- Note: Click on a result to see a summary of the match.

=== Fixtures ===
Match 1
22 March 2025
19:30 (N)
Scorecard

Kolkata Knight Riders (H); 174/8 (20 overs)	v	Royal Challengers Bengaluru; 177/3 (16.2 overs)
Ajinkya Rahane 56 (31); Krunal Pandya 3/29 (4 overs)		Virat Kohli 59* (36); Sunil Narine 1/27 (4 overs)

Royal Challengers Bengaluru won by 7 wickets
Eden Gardens, Kolkata
Umpires: Abhijeet Bengeri (Ind) and Vinod Seshan (Ind)
Player of the match: Krunal Pandya (Royal Challengers Bengaluru)

- Royal Challengers Bengaluru won the toss and elected to field.

Match 2
23 March 2025
15:30 (D/N)
Scorecard

Sunrisers Hyderabad (H); 286/6 (20 overs)	v	Rajasthan Royals; 242/6 (20 overs)
Ishan Kishan 106* (47); Tushar Deshpande 3/44 (4 overs)		Dhruv Jurel 70 (35); Harshal Patel 2/34 (4 overs)

Sunrisers Hyderabad won by 44 runs
Rajiv Gandhi International Cricket Stadium, Hyderabad
Umpires: Adrian Holdstock (SA) and Akshay Totre (Ind)
Player of the match: Ishan Kishan (Sunrisers Hyderabad)

- Rajasthan Royals won the toss and elected to field.
- Aniket Verma (Sunrisers Hyderabad) made his IPL debut.

Match 3
23 March 2025
19:30 (N)
Scorecard

Mumbai Indians; 155/9 (20 overs)	v	Chennai Super Kings (H); 158/6 (19.1 overs)
Tilak Varma 31 (25); Noor Ahmad 4/18 (4 overs)		Rachin Ravindra 65* (45); Vignesh Puthur 3/32 (4 overs)

Chennai Super Kings won by 4 wickets
M. A. Chidambaram Stadium, Chennai
Umpires: K. N. Ananthapadmanabhan (Ind) and Saiyed Khalid (Ind)
Player of the match: Noor Ahmad (Chennai Super Kings)

- Chennai Super Kings won the toss and elected to field.
- Vignesh Puthur (Mumbai Indians) made his T20 debut.
- Ryan Rickelton (Mumbai Indians) made his IPL debut.

Match 4
24 March 2025
19:30 (N)
Scorecard

Lucknow Super Giants; 209/8 (20 overs)	v	Delhi Capitals (H); 211/9 (19.3 overs)
Nicholas Pooran 75 (30); Mitchell Starc 3/42 (4 overs)		Ashutosh Sharma 66* (31); Shardul Thakur 2/19 (2 overs)

Delhi Capitals won by 1 wicket
ACA–VDCA Cricket Stadium, Visakhapatnam
Umpires: Abhijit Bhattacharya (Ind) and Ulhas Gandhe (Ind)
Player of the match: Ashutosh Sharma (Delhi Capitals)

- Delhi Capitals won the toss and elected to field.
- Vipraj Nigam (Delhi Capitals), Prince Yadav and Digvesh Rathi (Lucknow Super Giants) made their IPL debuts.

Match 5
25 March 2025
19:30 (N)
Scorecard

Punjab Kings; 243/5 (20 overs)	v	Gujarat Titans (H); 232/5 (20 overs)
Shreyas Iyer 97* (42); Sai Kishore 3/30 (4 overs)		Sai Sudharsan 74 (41); Arshdeep Singh 2/36 (4 overs)

Punjab Kings won by 11 runs
Narendra Modi Stadium, Ahmedabad
Umpires: Abhijeet Bengeri (Ind) and Vinod Seshan (Ind)
Player of the match: Shreyas Iyer (Punjab Kings)

- Gujarat Titans won the toss and elected to field.
- Priyansh Arya and Suryansh Shedge (Punjab Kings) made their IPL debuts.

Match 6
26 March 2025
19:30 (N)
Scorecard

Rajasthan Royals (H); 151/9 (20 overs)	v	Kolkata Knight Riders; 153/2 (17.3 overs)
Dhruv Jurel 33 (28); Varun Chakravarthy 2/17 (4 overs)		Quinton de Kock 97* (61); Wanindu Hasaranga 1/34 (3 overs)

Kolkata Knight Riders won by 8 wickets
ACA Cricket Stadium, Guwahati
Umpires: Rohan Pandit (Ind) and Akshay Totre (Ind)
Player of the match: Quinton de Kock (Kolkata Knight Riders)

- Kolkata Knight Riders won the toss and elected to field.

Match 7
27 March 2025
19:30 (N)
Scorecard

Sunrisers Hyderabad (H); 190/9 (20 overs)	v	Lucknow Super Giants; 193/5 (16.1 overs)
Travis Head 47 (28); Shardul Thakur 4/34 (4 overs)		Nicholas Pooran 70 (26); Pat Cummins 2/29 (3 overs)

Lucknow Super Giants won by 5 wickets
Rajiv Gandhi International Cricket Stadium, Hyderabad
Umpires: Abhijit Bhattacharya (Ind) and Ulhas Gandhe (Ind)
Player of the match: Shardul Thakur (Lucknow Super Giants)

- Lucknow Super Giants won the toss and elected to field.

Match 8
28 March 2025
19:30 (N)
Scorecard

Royal Challengers Bengaluru; 196/7 (20 overs)	v	Chennai Super Kings (H); 146/8 (20 overs)
Rajat Patidar 51 (32); Noor Ahmad 3/36 (4 overs)		Rachin Ravindra 41 (31); Josh Hazlewood 3/21 (4 overs)

Royal Challengers Bengaluru won by 50 runs
M. A. Chidambaram Stadium, Chennai
Umpires: Saiyed Khalid (Ind) and Nitin Menon (Ind)
Player of the match: Rajat Patidar (Royal Challengers Bengaluru)

- Chennai Super Kings won the toss and elected to field.

Match 9
29 March 2025
19:30 (N)
Scorecard

Gujarat Titans (H); 196/8 (20 overs)	v	Mumbai Indians; 160/6 (20 overs)
Sai Sudharsan 63 (41); Hardik Pandya 2/29 (4 overs)		Suryakumar Yadav 48 (28); Prasidh Krishna 2/18 (4 overs)

Gujarat Titans won by 36 runs
Narendra Modi Stadium, Ahmedabad
Umpires: Abhijeet Bengeri (Ind) and Vinod Seshan (Ind)
Player of the match: Prasidh Krishna (Gujarat Titans)

- Mumbai Indians won the toss and elected to field.

Match 10
30 March 2025
15:30 (N)
Scorecard

Sunrisers Hyderabad; 163 (18.4 overs)	v	Delhi Capitals (H); 166/3 (16 overs)
Aniket Verma 74 (41); Mitchell Starc 5/35 (3.4 overs)		Faf du Plessis 50 (27); Zeeshan Ansari 3/42 (4 overs)

Delhi Capitals won by 7 wickets
ACA–VDCA Cricket Stadium, Visakhapatnam
Umpires: Abhijit Bhattacharya (Ind) and Ulhas Gandhe (Ind)
Player of the match: Mitchell Starc (Delhi Capitals)

- Sunrisers Hyderabad won the toss and elected to bat.
- Zeeshan Ansari (Sunrisers Hyderabad) made his IPL debut.

Match 11
30 March 2025
19:30 (N)
Scorecard

Rajasthan Royals (H); 182/9 (20 overs)	v	Chennai Super Kings; 176/6 (20 overs)
Nitish Rana 81 (36); Noor Ahmad 2/28 (4 overs); Matheesha Pathirana 2/28 (4 overs)		Ruturaj Gaikwad 63 (44); Wanindu Hasaranga 4/35 (4 overs)

Rajasthan Royals won by 6 runs
ACA Cricket Stadium, Guwahati
Umpires: Adrian Holdstock (SA) and Akshay Totre (Ind)
Player of the match: Nitish Rana (Rajasthan Royals)

- Chennai Super Kings won the toss and elected to field.

Match 12
31 March 2025
19:30 (N)
Scorecard

Kolkata Knight Riders; 116 (16.2 overs)	v	Mumbai Indians (H); 121/2 (12.5 overs)
Angkrish Raghuvanshi 26 (16); Ashwani Kumar 4/24 (3 overs)		Ryan Rickelton 62* (41); Andre Russell 2/35 (2.5 overs)

Mumbai Indians won by 8 wickets
Wankhede Stadium, Mumbai
Umpires: Saiyed Khalid (Ind) and Saidharshan Kumar (Ind)
Player of the match: Ashwani Kumar (Mumbai Indians)

- Mumbai Indians won the toss and elected to field.
- Ashwani Kumar (Mumbai Indians) made his IPL debut.

Match 13
1 April 2025
19:30 (N)
Scorecard

Lucknow Super Giants (H); 171/7 (20 overs)	v	Punjab Kings; 177/2 (16.2 overs)
Nicholas Pooran 44 (30); Arshdeep Singh 3/43 (4 overs)		Prabhsimran Singh 69 (34); Digvesh Rathi 2/30 (4 overs)

Punjab Kings won by 8 wickets
Ekana Cricket Stadium, Lucknow
Umpires: Abhijeet Bengeri (Ind) and Vinod Seshan (Ind)
Player of the match: Prabhsimran Singh (Punjab Kings)

- Punjab Kings won the toss and elected to field.

Match 14
2 April 2025
19:30 (N)
Scorecard

Royal Challengers Bengaluru (H); 169/8 (20 overs)	v	Gujarat Titans; 170/2 (17.5 overs)
Liam Livingstone 54 (40); Mohammed Siraj 3/19 (4 overs)		Jos Buttler 73* (39); Bhuvneshwar Kumar 1/23 (4 overs)

Gujarat Titans won by 8 wickets
M. Chinnaswamy Stadium, Bengaluru
Umpires: Abhijit Bhattacharya (Ind) and Ulhas Gandhe (Ind)
Player of the match: Mohammed Siraj (Gujarat Titans)

- Gujarat Titans won the toss and elected to field.

Match 15
3 April 2025
19:30 (N)
Scorecard

Kolkata Knight Riders (H); 200/6 (20 overs)	v	Sunrisers Hyderabad; 120 (16.4 overs)
Venkatesh Iyer 60 (29); Kamindu Mendis 1/4 (1 over)		Heinrich Klaasen 33 (21); Varun Chakravarthy 3/22 (4 overs)

Kolkata Knight Riders won by 80 runs
Eden Gardens, Kolkata
Umpires: Adrian Holdstock (SA) and Akshay Totre (Ind)
Player of the match: Vaibhav Arora (Kolkata Knight Riders)

- Sunrisers Hyderabad won the toss and elected to field.
- Kamindu Mendis (Sunrisers Hyderabad) made his IPL debut.

Match 16
4 April 2025
19:30 (N)
Scorecard

Lucknow Super Giants (H); 203/8 (20 overs)	v	Mumbai Indians; 191/5 (20 overs)
Mitchell Marsh 60 (31); Hardik Pandya 5/36 (4 overs)		Suryakumar Yadav 67 (43); Digvesh Rathi 1/21 (4 overs)

Lucknow Super Giants won by 12 runs
Ekana Cricket Stadium, Lucknow
Umpires: Nitin Menon (Ind) and Saidharshan Kumar (Ind)
Player of the match: Digvesh Rathi (Lucknow Super Giants)

- Mumbai Indians won the toss and elected to field.

Match 17
5 April 2025
15:30 (D/N)
Scorecard

Delhi Capitals; 183/6 (20 overs)	v	Chennai Super Kings (H); 158/5 (20 overs)
KL Rahul 77 (51); Khaleel Ahmed 2/25 (4 overs)		Vijay Shankar 69* (54); Vipraj Nigam 2/27 (4 overs)

Delhi Capitals won by 25 runs
M. A. Chidambaram Stadium, Chennai
Umpires: Abhijeet Bengeri (Ind) and Parashar Joshi (Ind)
Player of the match: KL Rahul (Delhi Capitals)

- Delhi Capitals won the toss and elected to bat.

Match 18
5 April 2025
19:30 (N)
Scorecard

Rajasthan Royals; 205/4 (20 overs)	v	Punjab Kings (H); 155/9 (20 overs)
Yashasvi Jaiswal 67 (45); Lockie Ferguson 2/37 (4 overs)		Nehal Wadhera 62 (41); Jofra Archer 3/25 (4 overs)

Rajasthan Royals won by 50 runs
Maharaja Yadavindra Singh International Cricket Stadium, Mullanpur
Umpires: Ulhas Gandhe (Ind) and Kannur Swaroopanand (Ind)
Player of the match: Jofra Archer (Rajasthan Royals)

- Punjab Kings won the toss and elected to field.

Match 19
6 April 2025
19:30 (N)
Scorecard

Sunrisers Hyderabad (H); 152/8 (20 overs)	v	Gujarat Titans; 153/3 (16.4 overs)
Nitish Kumar Reddy 31 (34); Mohammed Siraj 4/17 (4 overs)		Shubman Gill 61* (43); Mohammed Shami 2/28 (4 overs)

Gujarat Titans won by 7 wickets
Rajiv Gandhi International Cricket Stadium, Hyderabad
Umpires: K. N. Ananthapadmanabhan (Ind) and Saidharshan Kumar (Ind)
Player of the match: Mohammed Siraj (Gujarat Titans)

- Gujarat Titans won the toss and elected to field.

Match 20
7 April 2025
19:30 (N)
Scorecard

Royal Challengers Bengaluru; 221/5 (20 overs)	v	Mumbai Indians (H); 209/9 (20 overs)
Virat Kohli 67 (42); Hardik Pandya 2/45 (4 overs)		Tilak Varma 56 (29); Krunal Pandya 4/45 (4 overs)

Royal Challengers Bengaluru won by 12 runs
Wankhede Stadium, Mumbai
Umpires: Parashar Joshi (Ind) and Vinod Seshan (Ind)
Player of the match: Rajat Patidar (Royal Challengers Bengaluru)

- Mumbai Indians won the toss and elected to field.

Match 21
8 April 2025
15:30 (D/N)
Scorecard

Lucknow Super Giants; 238/3 (20 overs)	v	Kolkata Knight Riders (H); 234/7 (20 overs)
Nicholas Pooran 87* (36); Harshit Rana 2/51 (4 overs)		Ajinkya Rahane 61 (35); Shardul Thakur 2/52 (4 overs)

Lucknow Super Giants won by 4 runs
Eden Gardens, Kolkata
Umpires: Adrian Holdstock (SA) and Akshay Totre (Ind)
Player of the match: Nicholas Pooran (Lucknow Super Giants)

- Kolkata Knight Riders won the toss and elected to field.
- This match was originally scheduled for 6 April but was rescheduled to 8 April.

Match 22
8 April 2025
19:30 (N)
Scorecard

Punjab Kings (H); 219/6 (20 overs)	v	Chennai Super Kings; 201/5 (20 overs)
Priyansh Arya 103 (42); Khaleel Ahmed 2/45 (4 overs)		Devon Conway 69 (49); Lockie Ferguson 2/40 (4 overs)

Punjab Kings won by 18 runs
Maharaja Yadavindra Singh International Cricket Stadium, Mullanpur
Umpires: Abhijit Bhattacharya (Ind) and Ulhas Gandhe (Ind)
Player of the match: Priyansh Arya (Punjab Kings)

- Punjab Kings won the toss and elected to bat.

Match 23
9 April 2025
19:30 (N)
Scorecard

Gujarat Titans (H); 217/6 (20 overs)	v	Rajasthan Royals; 159 (19.2 overs)
Sai Sudharsan 82 (53); Tushar Deshpande 2/53 (4 overs)		Shimron Hetmyer 52 (32); Prasidh Krishna 3/24 (4 overs)

Gujarat Titans won by 58 runs
Narendra Modi Stadium, Ahmedabad
Umpires: Rohan Pandit (Ind) and Akshay Totre (Ind)
Player of the match: Sai Sudharsan (Gujarat Titans)

- Rajasthan Royals won the toss and elected to field.

Match 24
10 April 2025
19:30 (N)
Scorecard

Royal Challengers Bengaluru (H); 163/7 (20 overs)	v	Delhi Capitals; 169/4 (17.5 overs)
Phil Salt 37 (17); Kuldeep Yadav 2/17 (4 overs)		KL Rahul 93* (53); Bhuvneshwar Kumar 2/26 (4 overs)

Delhi Capitals won by 6 wickets
M. Chinnaswamy Stadium, Bengaluru
Umpires: K. N. Ananthapadmanabhan (Ind) and Saidharshan Kumar (Ind)
Player of the match: KL Rahul (Delhi Capitals)

- Delhi Capitals won the toss and elected to field.

Match 25
11 April 2025
19:30 (N)
Scorecard

Chennai Super Kings (H); 103/9 (20 overs)	v	Kolkata Knight Riders; 107/2 (10.1 overs)
Shivam Dube 31* (29); Sunil Narine 3/13 (4 overs)		Sunil Narine 44 (18); Noor Ahmad 1/8 (2 overs)

Kolkata Knight Riders won by 8 wickets
M. A. Chidambaram Stadium, Chennai
Umpires: Chris Gaffaney (NZ) and Parashar Joshi (Ind)
Player of the match: Sunil Narine (Kolkata Knight Riders)

- Kolkata Knight Riders won the toss and elected to field.

Match 26
12 April 2025
15:30 (N)
Scorecard

Gujarat Titans; 180/6 (20 overs)	v	Lucknow Super Giants (H); 186/4 (19.3 overs)
Shubman Gill 60 (38); Shardul Thakur 2/34 (4 overs)		Nicholas Pooran 61 (34); Prasidh Krishna 2/26 (4 overs)

Lucknow Super Giants won by 6 wickets
Ekana Cricket Stadium, Lucknow
Umpires: Ulhas Gandhe (Ind) and Kannur Swaroopanand (Ind)
Player of the match: Aiden Markram (Lucknow Super Giants)

- Lucknow Super Giants won the toss and elected to field.

Match 27
12 April 2025
19:30 (N)
Scorecard

Punjab Kings; 245/6 (20 overs)	v	Sunrisers Hyderabad (H); 247/2 (18.3 overs)
Shreyas Iyer 82 (36); Harshal Patel 4/42 (4 overs)		Abhishek Sharma 141 (55); Arshdeep Singh 1/37 (4 overs)

Sunrisers Hyderabad won by 8 wickets
Rajiv Gandhi International Cricket Stadium, Hyderabad
Umpires: Keyur Kelkar (Ind) and Akshay Totre (Ind)
Player of the match: Abhishek Sharma (Sunrisers Hyderabad)

- Punjab Kings won the toss and elected to bat.
- Eshan Malinga (Sunrisers Hyderabad) made his IPL debut.

Match 28
13 April 2025
15:30 (D/N)
Scorecard

Rajasthan Royals (H); 173/4 (20 overs)	v	Royal Challengers Bengaluru; 175/1 (17.3 overs)
Yashasvi Jaiswal 75 (47); Josh Hazlewood 1/26 (3 overs)		Phil Salt 65 (33); Kumar Kartikeya 1/25 (3 overs)

Royal Challengers Bengaluru won by 9 wickets
Sawai Mansingh Stadium, Jaipur
Umpires: Saidharshan Kumar (Ind) and Nitin Menon (Ind)
Player of the match: Phil Salt (Royal Challengers Bengaluru)

- Royal Challengers Bengaluru won the toss and elected to field.

Match 29
13 April 2025
19:30 (N)
Scorecard

Mumbai Indians; 205/5 (20 overs)	v	Delhi Capitals (H); 193 (19 overs)
Tilak Varma 59 (33); Kuldeep Yadav 2/23 (4 overs)		Karun Nair 89 (40); Karn Sharma 3/36 (4 overs)

Mumbai Indians won by 12 runs
Arun Jaitley Stadium, Delhi
Umpires: Chris Gaffaney (NZ) and Vinod Seshan (Ind)
Player of the match: Karn Sharma (Mumbai Indians)

- Delhi Capitals won the toss and elected to field.

Match 30
14 April 2025
19:30 (N)
Scorecard

Lucknow Super Giants (H); 166/7 (20 overs)	v	Chennai Super Kings; 168/5 (19.3 overs)
Rishabh Pant 63 (49); Ravindra Jadeja 2/24 (3 overs)		Shivam Dube 43* (37); Ravi Bishnoi 2/18 (3 overs)

Chennai Super Kings won by 5 wickets
Ekana Cricket Stadium, Lucknow
Umpires: Ulhas Gandhe (Ind) and Virender Sharma (Ind)
Player of the match: MS Dhoni (Chennai Super Kings)

- Chennai Super Kings won the toss and elected to field.
- Shaik Rasheed (Chennai Super Kings) made his IPL debut.

Match 31
15 April 2025
19:30 (N)
Scorecard

Punjab Kings (H); 111 (15.3 overs)	v	Kolkata Knight Riders; 95 (15.1 overs)
Prabhsimran Singh 30 (15); Harshit Rana 3/25 (3 overs)		Angkrish Raghuvanshi 37 (28); Yuzvendra Chahal 4/28 (4 overs)

Punjab Kings won by 16 runs
Maharaja Yadavindra Singh International Cricket Stadium, Mullanpur
Umpires: Mohit Krishnadas (Ind) and Saidharshan Kumar (Ind)
Player of the match: Yuzvendra Chahal (Punjab Kings)

- Punjab Kings won the toss and elected to bat.
- Xavier Bartlett and Josh Inglis (Punjab Kings) made their IPL debuts.

Match 32
16 April 2025
19:30 (N)
Scorecard

Delhi Capitals (H); 188/5 (20 overs)	v	Rajasthan Royals; 188/4 (20 overs)
Abhishek Porel 49 (37); Jofra Archer 2/32 (4 overs)		Nitish Rana 51 (28); Axar Patel 1/23 (3 overs)

Match tied
(Delhi Capitals won the Super Over)
Arun Jaitley Stadium, Delhi
Umpires: Keyur Kelkar (Ind) and Akshay Totre (Ind)
Player of the match: Mitchell Starc (Delhi Capitals)

- Rajasthan Royals won the toss and elected to field.
- Super Over: Rajasthan Royals 11/2 (0.5 overs), Delhi Capitals 13/0 (0.4 overs)

Match 33
17 April 2025
19:30 (N)
Scorecard

Sunrisers Hyderabad; 162/5 (20 overs)	v	Mumbai Indians (H); 166/6 (18.1 overs)
Abhishek Sharma 40 (28); Will Jacks 2/14 (3 overs)		Will Jacks 36 (26); Pat Cummins 3/26 (4 overs)

Mumbai Indians won by 4 wickets
Wankhede Stadium, Mumbai
Umpires: Jayaraman Madanagopal (Ind) and Vinod Seshan (Ind)
Player of the match: Will Jacks (Mumbai Indians)

- Mumbai Indians won the toss and elected to field.

Match 34
18 April 2025
19:30 (N)
Scorecard

Royal Challengers Bengaluru (H); 95/9 (14 overs)	v	Punjab Kings; 98/5 (12.1 overs)
Tim David 50* (26); Marco Jansen 2/10 (3 overs)		Nehal Wadhera 33* (19); Josh Hazlewood 3/14 (3 overs)

Punjab Kings won by 5 wickets
M. Chinnaswamy Stadium, Bengaluru
Umpires: Ulhas Gandhe (Ind) and Virender Sharma (Ind)
Player of the match: Tim David (Royal Challengers Bengaluru)

- Punjab Kings won the toss and elected to field.
- The match was reduced to 14 overs per side due to rain.
- Manoj Bhandage (Royal Challengers Bengaluru) made his IPL debut.

Match 35
19 April 2025
15:30 (D/N)
Scorecard

Delhi Capitals; 203/8 (20 overs)	v	Gujarat Titans (H); 204/3 (19.2 overs)
Axar Patel 39 (32); Prasidh Krishna 4/41 (4 overs)		Jos Buttler 97* (54); Kuldeep Yadav 1/30 (4 overs)

Gujarat Titans won by 7 wickets
Narendra Modi Stadium, Ahmedabad
Umpires: Keyur Kelkar (Ind) and Akshay Totre (Ind)
Player of the match: Jos Buttler (Gujarat Titans)

- Gujarat Titans won the toss and elected to field.

Match 36
19 April 2025
19:30 (N)
Scorecard

Lucknow Super Giants; 180/5 (20 overs)	v	Rajasthan Royals (H); 178/5 (20 overs)
Aiden Markram 66 (45); Wanindu Hasaranga 2/31 (4 overs)		Yashasvi Jaiswal 74 (52); Avesh Khan 3/37 (4 overs)

Lucknow Super Giants won by 2 runs
Sawai Mansingh Stadium, Jaipur
Umpires: Jayaraman Madanagopal (Ind) and Vinod Seshan (Ind)
Player of the match: Avesh Khan (Lucknow Super Giants)

- Lucknow Super Giants won the toss and elected to bat.
- Vaibhav Sooryavanshi (Rajasthan Royals) became the youngest player to make IPL debut.

Match 37
20 April 2025
15:30 (N)
Scorecard

Punjab Kings (H); 157/6 (20 overs)	v	Royal Challengers Bengaluru; 159/3 (18.5 overs)
Prabhsimran Singh 33 (17); Krunal Pandya 2/25 (4 overs)		Virat Kohli 73* (54); Arshdeep Singh 1/26 (3 overs)

Royal Challengers Bengaluru won by 7 wickets
Maharaja Yadavindra Singh International Cricket Stadium, Mullanpur
Umpires: Kaushik Gandhi (Ind) and Saidharshan Kumar (Ind)
Player of the match: Virat Kohli (Royal Challengers Bengaluru)

- Royal Challengers Bengaluru won the toss and elected to field.

Match 38
20 April 2025
19:30 (N)
Scorecard

Chennai Super Kings; 176/5 (20 overs)	v	Mumbai Indians (H); 177/1 (15.4 overs)
Ravindra Jadeja 53* (35); Jasprit Bumrah 2/25 (4 overs)		Rohit Sharma 76* (45); Ravindra Jadeja 1/28 (3 overs)

Mumbai Indians won by 9 wickets
Wankhede Stadium, Mumbai
Umpires: Abhijit Bhattacharya (Ind) and Virender Sharma (Ind)
Player of the match: Rohit Sharma (Mumbai Indians)

- Mumbai Indians won the toss and elected to field.
- Ayush Mhatre (Chennai Super Kings) made his T20 debut.

Match 39
21 April 2025
19:30 (N)
Scorecard

Gujarat Titans; 198/3 (20 overs)	v	Kolkata Knight Riders (H); 159/8 (20 overs)
Shubman Gill 90 (55); Andre Russell 1/13 (1 over)		Ajinkya Rahane 50 (36); Prasidh Krishna 2/25 (4 overs); Rashid Khan 2/25 (4 overs)

Gujarat Titans won by 39 runs
Eden Gardens, Kolkata
Umpires: Rohan Pandit (Ind) and Anish Sahasrabudhe (Ind)
Player of the match: Shubman Gill (Gujarat Titans)

- Kolkata Knight Riders won the toss and elected to field.

Match 40
22 April 2025
19:30 (N)
Scorecard

Lucknow Super Giants (H); 159/6 (20 overs)	v	Delhi Capitals; 161/2 (17.5 overs)
Aiden Markram 52 (33); Mukesh Kumar 4/33 (4 overs)		KL Rahul 57* (42); Aiden Markram 2/30 (3 overs)

Delhi Capitals won by 8 wickets
Ekana Cricket Stadium, Lucknow
Umpires: Kaushik Gandhi (Ind) and Saidharshan Kumar (Ind)
Player of the match: Mukesh Kumar (Delhi Capitals)

- Delhi Capitals won the toss and elected to field.

Match 41
23 April 2025
19:30 (N)
Scorecard

Sunrisers Hyderabad (H); 143/8 (20 overs)	v	Mumbai Indians; 146/3 (15.4 overs)
Heinrich Klaasen 71 (44); Trent Boult 4/26 (4 overs)		Rohit Sharma 70 (46); Jaydev Unadkat 1/25 (3 overs)

Mumbai Indians won by 7 wickets
Rajiv Gandhi International Cricket Stadium, Hyderabad
Umpires: Jayaraman Madanagopal (Ind) and Vinod Seshan (Ind)
Player of the match: Trent Boult (Mumbai Indians)

- Mumbai Indians won the toss and elected to field.

Match 42
24 April 2025
19:30 (N)
Scorecard

Royal Challengers Bengaluru (H); 205/5 (20 overs)	v	Rajasthan Royals; 194/9 (20 overs)
Virat Kohli 70 (42); Sandeep Sharma 2/45 (4 overs)		Yashasvi Jaiswal 49 (19); Josh Hazlewood 4/33 (4 overs)

Royal Challengers Bengaluru won by 11 runs
M. Chinnaswamy Stadium, Bengaluru
Umpires: Ulhas Gandhe (Ind) and Michael Gough (Eng)
Player of the match: Josh Hazlewood (Royal Challengers Bengaluru)

- Rajasthan Royals won the toss and elected to field.

Match 43
25 April 2025
19:30 (N)
Scorecard

Chennai Super Kings (H); 154 (19.5 overs)	v	Sunrisers Hyderabad; 155/5 (18.4 overs)
Dewald Brevis 42 (25); Harshal Patel 4/28 (4 overs)		Ishan Kishan 44 (34); Noor Ahmad 2/42 (4 overs)

Sunrisers Hyderabad won by 5 wickets
M. A. Chidambaram Stadium, Chennai
Umpires: Mohit Krishnadas (Ind) and Nitin Menon (Ind)
Player of the match: Harshal Patel (Sunrisers Hyderabad)

- Sunrisers Hyderabad won the toss and elected to field.

Match 44
26 April 2025
19:30 (N)
Scorecard

Punjab Kings; 201/4 (20 overs)	v	Kolkata Knight Riders (H); 7/0 (1 over)
Prabhsimran Singh 83 (49); Vaibhav Arora 2/34 (4 overs)		Sunil Narine 4* (3)

No result
Eden Gardens, Kolkata
Umpires: Adrian Holdstock (SA) and Anish Sahasrabudhe (Ind)

- Punjab Kings won the toss and elected to bat.
- No further play was possible due to rain.

Match 45
27 April 2025
15:30 (D/N)
Scorecard

Mumbai Indians (H); 215/7 (20 overs)	v	Lucknow Super Giants; 161 (20 overs)
Ryan Rickelton 58 (32); Mayank Yadav 2/40 (4 overs)		Ayush Badoni 35 (22); Jasprit Bumrah 4/22 (4 overs)

Mumbai Indians won by 54 runs
Wankhede Stadium, Mumbai
Umpires: Chris Gaffaney (NZ) and Jayaraman Madanagopal (Ind)
Player of the match: Will Jacks (Mumbai Indians)

- Lucknow Super Giants won the toss and elected to field.
- Corbin Bosch (Mumbai Indians) made his IPL debut.

Match 46
27 April 2025
19:30 (N)
Scorecard

Delhi Capitals (H); 162/8 (20 overs)	v	Royal Challengers Bengaluru; 165/4 (18.3 overs)
KL Rahul 41 (39); Bhuvneshwar Kumar 3/33 (4 overs)		Krunal Pandya 73* (47); Axar Patel 2/19 (4 overs)

Royal Challengers Bengaluru won by 6 wickets
Arun Jaitley Stadium, Delhi
Umpires: Mohit Krishnadas (Ind) and Nitin Menon (Ind)
Player of the match: Krunal Pandya (Royal Challengers Bengaluru)

- Royal Challengers Bengaluru won the toss and elected to field.
- Jacob Bethell (Royal Challengers Bengaluru) made his IPL debut.

Match 47
28 April 2025
19:30 (N)
Scorecard

Gujarat Titans; 209/4 (20 overs)	v	Rajasthan Royals (H); 212/2 (15.5 overs)
Shubman Gill 84 (50); Maheesh Theekshana 2/35 (4 overs)		Vaibhav Sooryavanshi 101 (38); Rashid Khan 1/24 (4 overs)

Rajasthan Royals won by 8 wickets
Sawai Mansingh Stadium, Jaipur
Umpires: Michael Gough (Eng) and Virender Sharma (Ind)
Player of the match: Vaibhav Sooryavanshi (Rajasthan Royals)

- Rajasthan Royals won the toss and elected to field.
- Karim Janat (Gujarat Titans) made his IPL debut.
- Vaibhav Sooryavanshi (Rajasthan Royals) became the youngest player to score a century in IPL history.

Match 48
29 April 2025
19:30 (N)
Scorecard

Kolkata Knight Riders; 204/9 (20 overs)	v	Delhi Capitals (H); 190/9 (20 overs)
Angkrish Raghuvanshi 44 (32); Mitchell Starc 3/43 (4 overs)		Faf du Plessis 62 (45); Sunil Narine 3/29 (4 overs)

Kolkata Knight Riders won by 14 runs
Arun Jaitley Stadium, Delhi
Umpires: Mohit Krishnadas (Ind) and Saidharshan Kumar (Ind)
Player of the match: Sunil Narine (Kolkata Knight Riders)

- Delhi Capitals won the toss and elected to field.

Match 49
30 April 2025
19:30 (N)
Scorecard

Chennai Super Kings (H); 190 (19.2 overs)	v	Punjab Kings; 194/6 (19.4 overs)
Sam Curran 88 (47); Yuzvendra Chahal 4/32 (3 overs)		Shreyas Iyer 72 (41); Khaleel Ahmed 2/28 (3.4 overs)

Punjab Kings won by 4 wickets
M. A. Chidambaram Stadium, Chennai
Umpires: Anish Sahasrabudhe (Ind) and Akshay Totre (Ind)
Player of the match: Shreyas Iyer (Punjab Kings)

- Punjab Kings won the toss and elected to field.
- Yuzvendra Chahal (Punjab Kings) took his second hat-trick in IPL.
- Chennai Super Kings were eliminated as a result of this match.

Match 50
1 May 2025
19:30 (N)
Scorecard

Mumbai Indians; 217/2 (20 overs)	v	Rajasthan Royals (H); 117 (16.1 overs)
Ryan Rickelton 61 (38); Riyan Parag 1/12 (2 overs)		Jofra Archer 30 (27); Karn Sharma 3/23 (4 overs)

Mumbai Indians won by 100 runs
Sawai Mansingh Stadium, Jaipur
Umpires: Parashar Joshi (Ind) and Vinod Seshan (Ind)
Player of the match: Ryan Rickelton (Mumbai Indians)

- Rajasthan Royals won the toss and elected to field.
- Rajasthan Royals were eliminated as a result of this match.

Match 51
2 May 2025
19:30 (N)
Scorecard

Gujarat Titans (H); 224/6 (20 overs)	v	Sunrisers Hyderabad; 186/6 (20 overs)
Shubman Gill 76 (38); Jaydev Unadkat 3/35 (4 overs)		Abhishek Sharma 74 (41); Prasidh Krishna 2/19 (4 overs)

Gujarat Titans won by 38 runs
Narendra Modi Stadium, Ahmedabad
Umpires: Virender Sharma (Ind) and Kannur Swaroopanand (Ind)
Player of the match: Prasidh Krishna (Gujarat Titans)

- Sunrisers Hyderabad won the toss and elected to field.

Match 52
3 May 2025
19:30 (N)
Scorecard

Royal Challengers Bengaluru (H); 213/5 (20 overs)	v	Chennai Super Kings; 211/5 (20 overs)
Virat Kohli 62 (33); Matheesha Pathirana 3/36 (4 overs)		Ayush Mhatre 94 (48); Lungi Ngidi 3/30 (4 overs)

Royal Challengers Bengaluru won by 2 runs
M. Chinnaswamy Stadium, Bengaluru
Umpires: Mohit Krishnadas (Ind) and Nitin Menon (Ind)
Player of the match: Romario Shepherd (Royal Challengers Bengaluru)

- Chennai Super Kings won the toss and elected to field.

Match 53
4 May 2025
15:30 (D/N)
Scorecard

Kolkata Knight Riders (H); 206/4 (20 overs)	v	Rajasthan Royals; 205/8 (20 overs)
Andre Russell 57* (25); Riyan Parag 1/21 (3 overs)		Riyan Parag 95 (45); Varun Chakravarthy 2/32 (4 overs)

Kolkata Knight Riders won by 1 run
Eden Gardens, Kolkata
Umpires: Rohan Pandit (Ind) and Anish Sahasrabudhe (Ind)
Player of the match: Andre Russell (Kolkata Knight Riders)

- Kolkata Knight Riders won the toss and elected to bat.

Match 54
4 May 2025
19:30 (N)
Scorecard

Punjab Kings (H); 236/5 (20 overs)	v	Lucknow Super Giants; 199/7 (20 overs)
Prabhsimran Singh 91 (48); Akash Singh 2/30 (4 overs)		Ayush Badoni 74 (40); Arshdeep Singh 3/16 (4 overs)

Punjab Kings won by 37 runs
HPCA Cricket Stadium, Dharamshala
Umpires: Parashar Joshi (Ind) and Jayaraman Madanagopal (Ind)
Player of the match: Prabhsimran Singh (Punjab Kings)

- Lucknow Super Giants won the toss and elected to field.

Match 55
5 May 2025
19:30 (N)
Scorecard

Delhi Capitals; 133/7 (20 overs)	v	Sunrisers Hyderabad (H)
Ashutosh Sharma 41 (26); Pat Cummins 3/19 (4 overs)

No result
Rajiv Gandhi International Cricket Stadium, Hyderabad
Umpires: Virender Sharma (Ind) and Kannur Swaroopanand (Ind)

- Sunrisers Hyderabad won the toss and elected to field.
- No further play was possible due to rain.
- Sunrisers Hyderabad were eliminated as a result of this match.

Match 56
6 May 2025
19:30 (N)
Scorecard

Mumbai Indians (H); 155/8 (20 overs)	v	Gujarat Titans; 147/7 (19 overs)
Will Jacks 53 (35); Sai Kishore 2/34 (4 overs)		Shubman Gill 43 (46); Jasprit Bumrah 2/19 (4 overs)

Gujarat Titans won by 3 wickets (DLS method)
Wankhede Stadium, Mumbai
Umpires: Kaushik Gandhi (Ind) and Saidharshan Kumar (Ind)
Player of the match: Shubman Gill (Gujarat Titans)

- Gujarat Titans won the toss and elected to field.
- Gujarat Titans were set a revised target of 147 runs from 19 overs due to rain.

Match 57
7 May 2025
19:30 (N)
Scorecard

Kolkata Knight Riders (H); 179/6 (20 overs)	v	Chennai Super Kings; 183/8 (19.4 overs)
Ajinkya Rahane 48 (33); Noor Ahmad 4/31 (4 overs)		Dewald Brevis 52 (25); Vaibhav Arora 3/48 (3 overs)

Chennai Super Kings won by 2 wickets
Eden Gardens, Kolkata
Umpires: Adrian Holdstock (SA) and Anish Sahasrabudhe (Ind)
Player of the match: Noor Ahmad (Chennai Super Kings)

- Kolkata Knight Riders won the toss and elected to bat.
- Urvil Patel (Chennai Super Kings) made his IPL debut.

Match N/A
8 May 2025
19:30 (N)

Punjab Kings (H); 122/1 (10.1 overs)	v	Delhi Capitals
Priyansh Arya 70 (34); T. Natarajan 1/4 (1.1 over)

Match abandoned and voided
HPCA Cricket Stadium, Dharamshala
Umpires: Chris Gaffaney (NZ) and Parashar Joshi (Ind)

- Punjab Kings won the toss and elected to bat.
- The match was abandoned midway due to technical and security issues amid the 2025 India–Pakistan crisis.
- After the suspension and rescheduling, it was voided (no points were awarded to the teams) and rescheduled for 24 May as Match 66 at Sawai Mansingh Stadium, Jaipur.

Match 58
17 May 2025
19:30 (N)
Scorecard

Royal Challengers Bengaluru (H)	v	Kolkata Knight Riders

Match abandoned
M. Chinnaswamy Stadium, Bengaluru
Umpires: K. N. Ananthapadmanabhan (Ind) and Nitin Menon (Ind)

- No toss.
- No play was possible due to rain.
- This match was unchanged by the rescheduling.
- Kolkata Knight Riders were eliminated as a result of this match.

Match 59
18 May 2025
15:30 (D/N)
Scorecard

Punjab Kings; 219/5 (20 overs)	v	Rajasthan Royals (H); 209/7 (20 overs)
Nehal Wadhera 70 (37); Tushar Deshpande 2/37 (4 overs)		Dhruv Jurel 53 (31); Harpreet Brar 3/22 (4 overs)

Punjab Kings won by 10 runs
Sawai Mansingh Stadium, Jaipur
Umpires: Abhijeet Bengeri (Ind) and Chris Gaffaney (NZ)
Player of the match: Harpreet Brar (Punjab Kings)

- Punjab Kings won the toss and elected to bat.
- This match was originally scheduled for 16 May at the same venue, before being rescheduled.
- Mitchell Owen (Punjab Kings) made his IPL debut.

Match 60
18 May 2025
19:30 (N)
Scorecard

Delhi Capitals (H); 199/3 (20 overs)	v	Gujarat Titans; 205/0 (19 overs)
KL Rahul 112* (65); Arshad Khan 1/7 (2 overs)		Sai Sudharsan 108* (61)

Gujarat Titans won by 10 wickets
Arun Jaitley Stadium, Delhi
Umpires: Adrian Holdstock (SA) and Keyur Kelkar (Ind)
Player of the match: Sai Sudharsan (Gujarat Titans)

- Gujarat Titans won the toss and elected to field.
- This match was originally scheduled for 11 May at the same venue, before being rescheduled.
- Gujarat Titans, Royal Challengers Bengaluru and Punjab Kings qualified for the playoffs as a result of this match.

Match 61
19 May 2025
19:30 (N)
Scorecard

Lucknow Super Giants (H); 205/7 (20 overs)	v	Sunrisers Hyderabad; 206/4 (18.2 overs)
Mitchell Marsh 65 (39); Eshan Malinga 2/28 (4 overs)		Abhishek Sharma 59 (20); Digvesh Rathi 2/37 (4 overs)

Sunrisers Hyderabad won by 6 wickets
Ekana Cricket Stadium, Lucknow
Umpires: Michael Gough (Eng) and Kannur Swaroopanand (Ind)
Player of the match: Abhishek Sharma (Sunrisers Hyderabad)

- Sunrisers Hyderabad won the toss and elected to field.
- This match was originally scheduled for 18 May at the same venue, before being rescheduled.
- Harsh Dubey (Sunrisers Hyderabad) made his IPL debut.
- Lucknow Super Giants were eliminated as a result of this match.

Match 62
20 May 2025
19:30 (N)
Scorecard

Chennai Super Kings (H); 187/8 (20 overs)	v	Rajasthan Royals; 188/4 (17.1 overs)
Ayush Mhatre 43 (20); Akash Madhwal 3/29 (4 overs)		Vaibhav Sooryavanshi 57 (33); Ravichandran Ashwin 2/41 (4 overs)

Rajasthan Royals won by 6 wickets
Arun Jaitley Stadium, Delhi
Umpires: Keyur Kelkar (Ind) and Rohan Pandit (Ind)
Player of the match: Akash Madhwal (Rajasthan Royals)

- Rajasthan Royals won the toss and elected to field.
- This match was originally scheduled for 12 May at the M. A. Chidambaram Stadium, before being rescheduled.

Match 63
21 May 2025
19:30 (N)
Scorecard

Mumbai Indians (H); 180/5 (20 overs)	v	Delhi Capitals; 121 (18.2 overs)
Suryakumar Yadav 73* (43); Mukesh Kumar 2/48 (4 overs)		Sameer Rizvi 39 (35); Mitchell Santner 3/11 (4 overs)

Mumbai Indians won by 59 runs
Wankhede Stadium, Mumbai
Umpires: Abhijeet Bengeri (Ind) and Jayaraman Madanagopal (Ind)
Player of the match: Suryakumar Yadav (Mumbai Indians)

- Delhi Capitals won the toss and elected to field.
- This match was originally scheduled for 15 May at the same venue, before being rescheduled.
- Madhav Tiwari (Delhi Capitals) made his T20 debut.
- Mumbai Indians qualified for the playoffs while Delhi Capitals were eliminated as a result of this match.

Match 64
22 May 2025
19:30 (N)
Scorecard

Lucknow Super Giants; 235/2 (20 overs)	v	Gujarat Titans (H); 202/9 (20 overs)
Mitchell Marsh 117 (64); Sai Kishore 1/34 (3 overs)		Shahrukh Khan 57 (29); Will O'Rourke 3/27 (4 overs)

Lucknow Super Giants won by 33 runs
Narendra Modi Stadium, Ahmedabad
Umpires: K. N. Ananthapadmanabhan (Ind) and Mohit Krishnadas (Ind)
Player of the match: Mitchell Marsh (Lucknow Super Giants)

- Gujarat Titans won the toss and elected to field.
- This match was originally scheduled for 14 May at the same venue, before being rescheduled.

Match 65
23 May 2025
19:30 (N)
Scorecard

Sunrisers Hyderabad; 231/6 (20 overs)	v	Royal Challengers Bengaluru (H); 189 (19.5 overs)
Ishan Kishan 94* (48); Romario Shepherd 2/14 (2 overs)		Phil Salt 62 (32); Pat Cummins 3/28 (4 overs)

Sunrisers Hyderabad won by 42 runs
Ekana Cricket Stadium, Lucknow
Umpires: Michael Gough (Eng) and Kannur Swaroopanand (Ind)
Player of the match: Ishan Kishan (Sunrisers Hyderabad)

- Royal Challengers Bengaluru won the toss and elected to field.
- This match was originally scheduled for 13 May at M. Chinnaswamy Stadium, before being rescheduled to the same venue, but was later moved to Lucknow due to the weather conditions in Bengaluru.

Match 66
24 May 2025
19:30 (N)
Scorecard

Punjab Kings (H); 206/8 (20 overs)	v	Delhi Capitals; 208/4 (19.3 overs)
Shreyas Iyer 53 (34); Mustafizur Rahman 3/33 (4 overs)		Sameer Rizvi 58* (25); Harpreet Brar 2/41 (4 overs)

Delhi Capitals won by 6 wickets
Sawai Mansingh Stadium, Jaipur
Umpires: Parashar Joshi (Ind) and Jayaraman Madanagopal (Ind)
Player of the match: Sameer Rizvi (Delhi Capitals)

- Delhi Capitals won the toss and elected to field.
- This match was originally scheduled for 8 May at the HPCA Cricket Stadium but was abandoned midway and voided before being rescheduled.

Match 67
25 May 2025
15:30 (D/N)
Scorecard

Chennai Super Kings; 230/5 (20 overs)	v	Gujarat Titans (H); 147 (18.3 overs)
Dewald Brevis 57 (23); Prasidh Krishna 2/22 (4 overs)		Sai Sudharsan 41 (28); Anshul Kamboj 3/13 (2.3 overs)

Chennai Super Kings won by 83 runs
Narendra Modi Stadium, Ahmedabad
Umpires: K. N. Ananthapadmanabhan (Ind) and Kaushik Gandhi (Ind)
Player of the match: Dewald Brevis (Chennai Super Kings)

- Chennai Super Kings won the toss and elected to bat.
- This match was originally scheduled for 18 May at the same venue, before being rescheduled.

Match 68
25 May 2025
19:30 (N)
Scorecard

Sunrisers Hyderabad (H); 278/3 (20 overs)	v	Kolkata Knight Riders; 168 (18.4 overs)
Heinrich Klaasen 105* (39); Sunil Narine 2/42 (4 overs)		Manish Pandey 37 (23); Jaydev Unadkat 3/24 (4 overs)

Sunrisers Hyderabad won by 110 runs
Arun Jaitley Stadium, Delhi
Umpires: Adrian Holdstock (SA) and Keyur Kelkar (Ind)
Player of the match: Heinrich Klaasen (Sunrisers Hyderabad)

- Sunrisers Hyderabad won the toss and elected to bat.
- This match was originally scheduled for 10 May at the Rajiv Gandhi Stadium, before being rescheduled.

Match 69
26 May 2025
19:30 (N)
Scorecard

Mumbai Indians; 184/7 (20 overs)	v	Punjab Kings (H); 187/3 (18.3 overs)
Suryakumar Yadav 57 (39); Arshdeep Singh 2/28 (4 overs)		Josh Inglis 73 (42); Mitchell Santner 2/41 (4 overs)

Punjab Kings won by 7 wickets
Sawai Mansingh Stadium, Jaipur
Umpires: Chris Gaffaney (NZ) and Parashar Joshi (Ind)
Player of the match: Josh Inglis (Punjab Kings)

- Punjab Kings won the toss and elected to field.
- This match was originally scheduled for 11 May at the HPCA Cricket Stadium, before being rescheduled.

Match 70
27 May 2025
19:30 (N)
Scorecard

Lucknow Super Giants (H); 227/3 (20 overs)	v	Royal Challengers Bengaluru; 230/4 (18.4 overs)
Rishabh Pant 118* (61); Nuwan Thushara 1/26 (4 overs)		Jitesh Sharma 85* (33); Will O'Rourke 2/74 (4 overs)

Royal Challengers Bengaluru won by 6 wickets
Ekana Cricket Stadium, Lucknow
Umpires: Michael Gough (Eng) and Virender Sharma (Ind)
Player of the match: Jitesh Sharma (Royal Challengers Bengaluru)

- Royal Challengers Bengaluru won the toss and elected to field.
- This match was originally scheduled for 9 May at the same venue, before being rescheduled.

== Playoffs ==
=== Bracket ===
Qualifier 1
29 May 2025 – Mullanpur
1	Punjab Kings	101 (14.1 overs)
2	Royal Challengers Bengaluru	106/2 (10 overs)
Eliminator
30 May 2025 – Mullanpur
3	Gujarat Titans	208/6 (20 overs)
4	Mumbai Indians	228/5 (20 overs)

Qualifier 2
1 June 2025 – Ahmedabad
Q1L	Punjab Kings	207/5 (19 overs)
EW	Mumbai Indians	203/6 (20 overs)

Final
3 June 2025 – Ahmedabad
Q1W	Royal Challengers Bengaluru	190/9 (20 overs)
Q2W	Punjab Kings	184/7 (20 overs)

=== Qualifier 1 ===
Qualifier 1
29 May 2025
19:30 (N)
Scorecard

Punjab Kings; 101 (14.1 overs)	v	Royal Challengers Bengaluru; 106/2 (10 overs)
Marcus Stoinis 26 (17); Suyash Sharma 3/17 (3 overs)		Phil Salt 56* (27); Kyle Jamieson 1/27 (3 overs)

Royal Challengers Bengaluru won by 8 wickets
Maharaja Yadavindra Singh International Cricket Stadium, Mullanpur
Umpires: Michael Gough (Eng) and Virender Sharma (Ind)
Player of the match: Suyash Sharma (Royal Challengers Bengaluru)

- Royal Challengers Bengaluru won the toss and elected to field.
- This match was originally scheduled for 20 May at the Rajiv Gandhi Stadium, before being rescheduled.
- Musheer Khan (Punjab Kings) made his T20 debut.
- Royal Challengers Bengaluru qualified for their fourth IPL final after 2009, 2011 and 2016.

=== Eliminator ===
Eliminator
30 May 2025
19:30 (N)
Scorecard

Mumbai Indians; 228/5 (20 overs)	v	Gujarat Titans; 208/6 (20 overs)
Rohit Sharma 81 (50); Sai Kishore 2/42 (4 overs)		Sai Sudharsan 80 (49); Trent Boult 2/56 (4 overs)

Mumbai Indians won by 20 runs
Maharaja Yadavindra Singh International Cricket Stadium, Mullanpur
Umpires: Ulhas Gandhe (Ind) and Rohan Pandit (Ind)
Player of the match: Rohit Sharma (Mumbai Indians)

- Mumbai Indians won the toss and elected to bat.
- This match was originally scheduled for 21 May at the Rajiv Gandhi Stadium, before being rescheduled.
- Kusal Mendis (Gujarat Titans) made his IPL debut.

=== Qualifier 2 ===
Qualifier 2
1 June 2025
19:30 (N)
Scorecard

Mumbai Indians; 203/6 (20 overs)	v	Punjab Kings; 207/5 (19 overs)
Suryakumar Yadav 44 (26); Azmatullah Omarzai 2/43 (4 overs)		Shreyas Iyer 87* (41); Ashwani Kumar 2/55 (4 overs)

Punjab Kings won by 5 wickets
Narendra Modi Stadium, Ahmedabad
Umpires: Chris Gaffaney (NZ) and Nitin Menon (Ind)
Player of the match: Shreyas Iyer (Punjab Kings)

- Punjab Kings won the toss and elected to field.
- This match was originally scheduled for 23 May at the Eden Gardens, before being rescheduled.
- Punjab Kings qualified for their second IPL final after 2014.

=== Final ===
Final
3 June 2025
19:30 (N)
Scorecard

Royal Challengers Bengaluru; 190/9 (20 overs)	v	Punjab Kings; 184/7 (20 overs)
Virat Kohli 43 (35); Arshdeep Singh 3/40 (4 overs)		Shashank Singh 61* (30); Krunal Pandya 2/17 (4 overs)

Royal Challengers Bengaluru won by 6 runs
Narendra Modi Stadium, Ahmedabad
Attendance: 91,419
Umpires: Jayaraman Madanagopal (Ind) and Nitin Menon (Ind)
Player of the match: Krunal Pandya (Royal Challengers Bengaluru)

- Punjab Kings won the toss and elected to field.
- This match was originally scheduled for 25 May at the Eden Gardens, before being rescheduled.
- Royal Challengers Bengaluru won their maiden title after 18 years.

== Statistics and awards ==
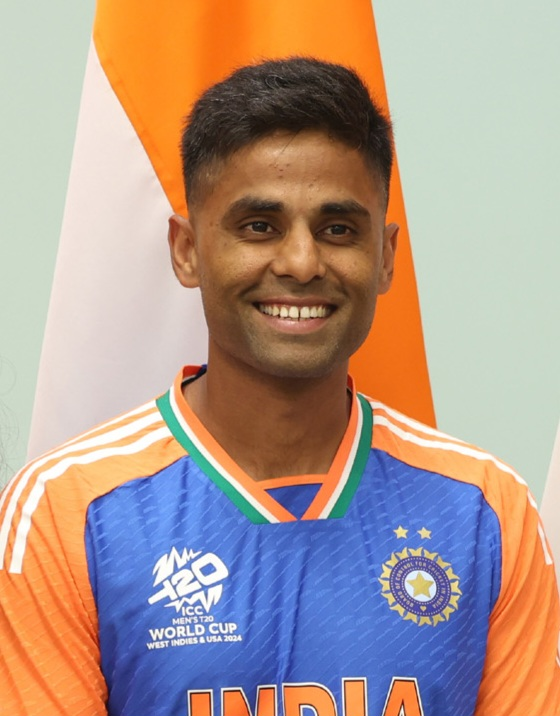
Suryakumar Yadav (pictured in 2024) was the most valuable player of the season.

Most runs
Runs	Player	Team
759	Sai Sudharsan	Gujarat Titans
717	Suryakumar Yadav	Mumbai Indians
657	Virat Kohli	Royal Challengers Bengaluru
650	Shubman Gill	Gujarat Titans
627	Mitchell Marsh	Lucknow Super Giants

Most wickets
Wickets	Player	Team
25	Prasidh Krishna	Gujarat Titans
24	Noor Ahmad	Chennai Super Kings
22	Josh Hazlewood	Royal Challengers Bengaluru
22	Trent Boult	Mumbai Indians
21	Arshdeep Singh	Punjab Kings

Most valuable player
Points	Player	Team
320.5	Suryakumar Yadav	Mumbai Indians
311.0	Sai Sudharsan	Gujarat Titans
273.0	Yashasvi Jaiswal	Rajasthan Royals
272.5	Nicholas Pooran	Lucknow Super Giants
272.0	Mitchell Marsh	Lucknow Super Giants

=== End of season awards ===
End of season awards
Award	Prize	Player	Team
Fantasy player of the season	₹10 lakh (US$11,000) and trophy	Sai Sudharsan	Gujarat Titans
Most Valuable Player	₹10 lakh (US$11,000) and trophy	Suryakumar Yadav	Mumbai Indians
Orange Cap (most runs)	₹10 lakh (US$11,000)	Sai Sudharsan	Gujarat Titans
Purple Cap (most wickets)	₹10 lakh (US$11,000)	Prasidh Krishna	Gujarat Titans
Emerging player of the season	₹10 lakh (US$11,000)	Sai Sudharsan	Gujarat Titans
Most fours	₹10 lakh (US$11,000) and trophy	Sai Sudharsan	Gujarat Titans
Most sixes	₹10 lakh (US$11,000) and trophy	Nicholas Pooran	Lucknow Super Giants
Most dot balls	₹10 lakh (US$11,000) and trophy	Mohammed Siraj	Gujarat Titans
Highest batting strike rate	₹10 lakh (US$11,000), trophy and a car	Vaibhav Sooryavanshi	Rajasthan Royals
Catch of the season	₹10 lakh (US$11,000) and trophy	Kamindu Mendis	Sunrisers Hyderabad
Best pitch	₹50 lakh (US$53,000)	Arun Jaitley Cricket Stadium, Delhi	—N/a
Team fairplay award	₹10 lakh (US$11,000)	—N/a	Chennai Super Kings
Runners-up	₹12.5 crore (US$1.3 million) and runners-up shield	—N/a	Punjab Kings
Champions	₹20 crore (US$2.1 million) and IPL trophy	—N/a	Royal Challengers Bengaluru

== See also ==
- 2025 Women's Premier League (cricket)
- 2025 Women's Premier League (cricket) final
