= 2025 Delhi Capitals season =

Indian Premier League cricket team

Delhi Capitals
2025 season
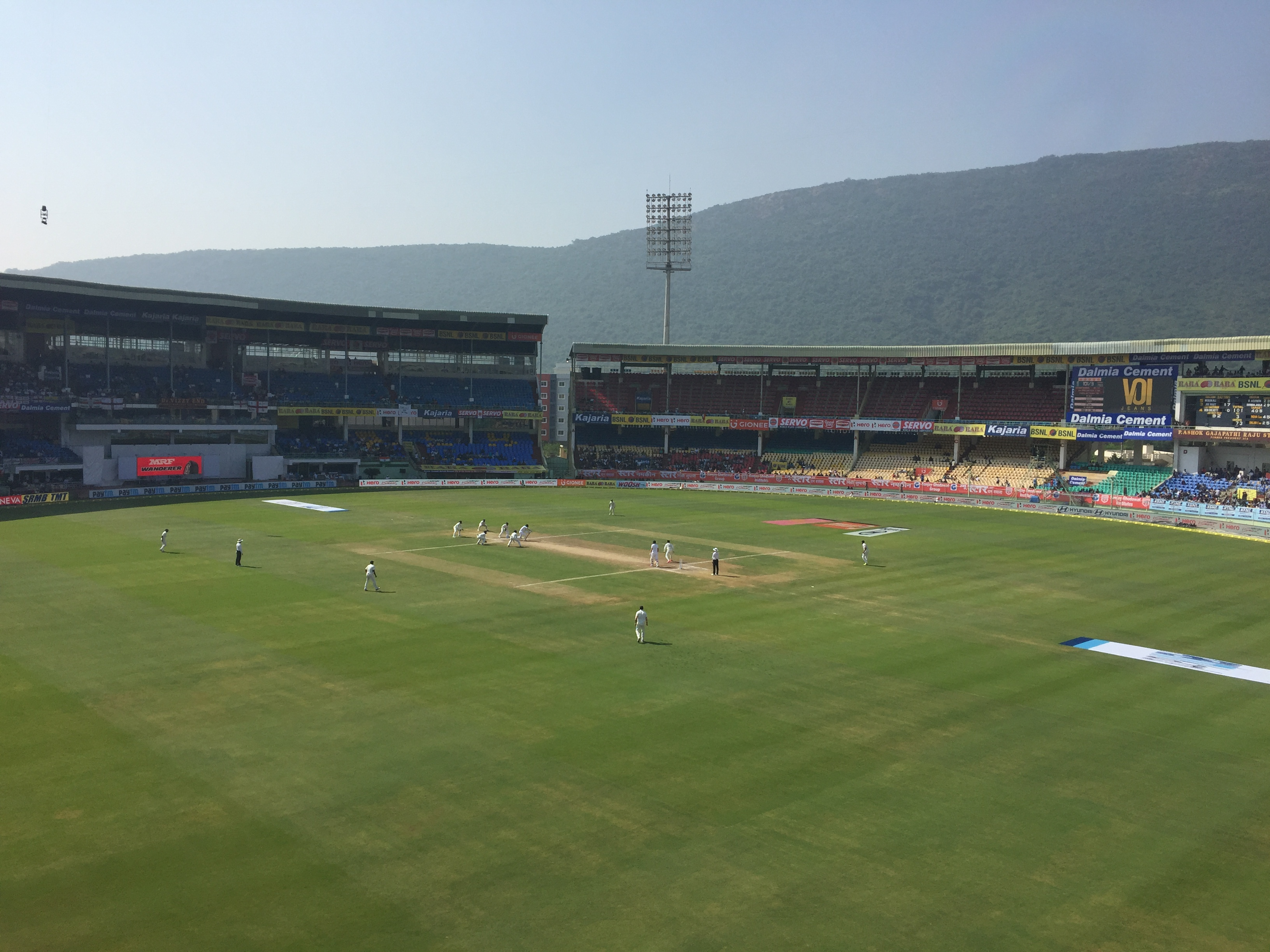
- Arun Jaitley Stadium and ACA–VDCA Cricket Stadium, home grounds of Delhi Capitals
- Coach: Hemang Badani
- Captain: Axar Patel
- Ground(s): Arun Jaitley Stadium, Delhi; ACA–VDCA Cricket Stadium, Visakhapatnam
- League stage: 5th place
- Most runs: KL Rahul (539)
- Most wickets: Kuldeep Yadav (15)
- Most catches: Mitchell Starc; Tristan Stubbs (7 each)
- Most wicket-keeping dismissals: Tristan Stubbs (7)

The 2025 season was the 18th season for the Indian Premier League (IPL) cricket franchise Delhi Capitals. They were one of the ten teams that competed in the 2025 IPL. Ahead of the season, Axar Patel was appointed as the captain. The team was coached by Hemang Badani.

Delhi Capitals were the last team to be eliminated in the 2025 IPL league stage after their loss to Mumbai Indians. They finished the season in fifth place with seven wins from 14 matches. KL Rahul scored the most runs (539) while Kuldeep Yadav took the most wickets (15) for Delhi in the 2025 season.

== Pre-season ==
The 2025 Indian Premier League was the 18th edition of the Indian Premier League (IPL), a professional Twenty20 (T20) cricket league, organised by the Board of Control for Cricket in India (BCCI). Delhi Capitals were one of the four active franchises to not have won the IPL title prior to 2025. The team finished in sixth place in the previous season.. The tournament featured ten teams competing in 74 matches from 22 March to 3 June 2025. Delhi played most their home matches at Arun Jaitley Stadium with two matches played at ACA–VDCA Cricket Stadium.

=== Player retention ===
Franchises were allowed to retain a maximum of six players from their squad, including a maximum of five recent international players. Franchises were required to submit their retention lists before 31 October 2024. Delhi retained four players but did not retain their prior captain Rishabh Pant.

Retained players
No.	Player	Salary
1	Axar Patel	₹16.5 crore (US$1.8 million)
2	Kuldeep Yadav	₹13.25 crore (US$1.4 million)
3	Tristan Stubbs	₹10 crore (US$1.1 million)
4	Abhishek Porel	₹4 crore (US$430,000)

Released players
Batters	Wicket-keepers	All-rounders	Fast bowlers	Spin bowlers
David Warner; Prithvi Shaw; Yash Dhull; Shai Hope; Jake Fraser-McGurk; Swastik Chikara; Harry Brook	Rishabh Pant; Ricky Bhui; Kumar Kushagra	Mitchell Marsh; Lalit Yadav; Gulbadin Naib; Sumit Kumar	Anrich Nortje; Ishant Sharma; Mukesh Kumar; Lungi Ngidi; Rasikh Salam Dar; Khaleel Ahmed; Jhye Richardson; Lizaad Williams	Praveen Dubey; Vicky Ostwal

=== Auction ===
The season's auction took place on 24 and 25 November 2024 in Jeddah, Saudi Arabia. The auction purse for each franchise was set at ₹120 crore (US$13 million), with the franchises being deducted an amount from the purse for each retained player. Delhi had a purse remaining of ₹73 crore (US$7.8 million). Franchises that did not retain six players, were allowed Right-to-Match (RTM) cards at the auction for each player not retained. Delhi had two cards available. Delhi bought nineteen players in the auction, including nine capped players and five overseas players. Delhi used their RTM cards to buy back Jake Fraser-McGurk and Mukesh Kumar for ₹9 crore (US$960,000) and ₹8 crore (US$850,000) respectively.

== Squad ==
- Players with international caps as of start of 2025 IPL are listed in **bold**.
- Ages are as of 22 March 2025.
- Withdrawn players are indicated by a dagger symbol (†) and placed at the bottom of the table.

Delhi Capitals squad for the 2025 Indian Premier League
S/N	Name	Nationality	Birth date	Batting style	Bowling style	Salary	Notes
1	**KL Rahul**	India	18 April 1992 (aged 32)	Right-handed	Right-arm medium	₹14 crore (US$1.5 million)	
2	**Donovan Ferreira**	South Africa	21 July 1998 (aged 26)	Right-handed	Right-arm off break	₹75 lakh (US$80,000)	Overseas
7	Sameer Rizvi	India	December 6, 2003 (aged 21)	Right-handed	Right arm off-break	₹95 lakh (US$100,000)	
13	**Faf du Plessis**	South Africa	July 13, 1984 (aged 40)	Right-handed	Right-arm leg-break	₹2 crore (US$210,000)	Overseas; stand-in captain (Note: Faf du Plessis captained Delhi Capitals against Mumbai Indians when Axar Patel was unavailable.)
20	**Axar Patel**	India	January 20, 1994 (aged 31)	Left-handed	Left-arm orthodox	₹16.5 crore (US$1.8 million)	Captain
23	**Kuldeep Yadav**	India	December 14, 1994 (aged 30)	Left-handed	Left-arm wrist spin	₹13.25 crore (US$1.4 million)	
24	Abhishek Porel	India	17 October 2002 (aged 22)	Left-handed	—N/a	₹4 crore (US$430,000)	
27	Mohit Sharma	India	September 18, 1988 (aged 36)	Right-handed	Right-arm medium	₹2.20 crore (US$240,000)	
28	Vipraj Nigam	India	July 28, 2004 (aged 20)	Right-handed	Right-arm legbreak	₹50 lakh (US$53,000)	
30	**Tristan Stubbs**	South Africa	14 August 2000 (aged 24)	Right-handed	—N/a	₹10 crore (US$1.1 million)	Overseas
49	**Mukesh Kumar**	India	October 12, 1993 (aged 31)	Right-handed	Right-arm medium	₹8 crore (US$850,000)	
50	Tripurana Vijay	India	September 5, 2001 (aged 23)	Right-handed	Right arm off-break	₹30 lakh (US$32,000)	
56	**Mitchell Starc**	Australia	January 30, 1990 (aged 35)	Left-handed	Left-arm fast	₹11.75 crore (US$1.3 million)	Overseas
90	**Mustafizur Rahman**	Bangladesh	September 6, 1995 (aged 29)	Left-handed	Left-arm fast-medium	₹6 crore (US$640,000)	Overseas; temporary (Note: Delhi Capitals signed Mustafizur Rahman as temporary replacement, following the IPL's suspension and rescheduling.) replacement (Note: Mustafizur Rahman replaced Jake Fraser-McGurk, after the latter withdrew due to personal reasons.)
—N/a	**Sediqullah Atal**	Afghanistan	August 12, 2001 (aged 23)	Left-handed	—N/a	₹1.25 crore (US$130,000)	Overseas; replacement (Note: Sediqullah Atal replaced Harry Brook, after the latter withdrew due to national duty.)
—N/a	**Dushmantha Chameera**	Sri Lanka	January 11, 1992 (aged 33)	Right-handed	Left-arm fast	₹75 lakh (US$80,000)	Overseas
—N/a	Manvanth Kumar	India	January 11, 2004 (aged 21)	Left-handed	Right arm Fast medium	₹30 lakh (US$32,000)	
—N/a	Ajay Mandal	India	February 25, 1996 (aged 29)	Left-handed	Slow left-arm orthodox	₹30 lakh (US$32,000)	
—N/a	**Karun Nair**	India	December 6, 1991 (aged 33)	Right-handed	Right-arm off break	₹50 lakh (US$53,000)	
—N/a	Darshan Nalkande	India	October 4, 1998 (aged 26)	Right-handed	Right-arm fast-medium	₹30 lakh (US$32,000)	
—N/a	**T. Natarajan**	India	April 4, 1991 (aged 33)	Left-handed	Left-arm medium	₹10.75 crore (US$1.1 million)	
—N/a	Ashutosh Sharma	India	September 15, 1998 (aged 26)	Right-handed	—N/a	₹3.80 crore (US$410,000)	
—N/a	Madhav Tiwari	India	September 28, 2003 (aged 21)	Right-handed	Right arm Fast medium	₹40 lakh (US$43,000)	
33	**Jake Fraser-McGurk** †	Australia	April 11, 2002 (aged 22)	Right-handed	Right-arm leg spin	₹9 crore (US$960,000)	Overseas; withdrawn
88	**Harry Brook** †	England	February 25, 1999 (aged 26)	Right-handed	Right-arm medium	₹6.25 crore (US$670,000)	Overseas; withdrawn

== Support staff ==
Hemang Badani replaced Ricky Ponting as head coach; Matthew Mott replaced Pravin Amre and Ajit Agarkar as assistant coaches; Munaf Patel replaced James Hopes as bowling coach; Anton Roux and Gnaneswara Rao replaced Biju George as fielding coaches; and Kevin Pietersen joined as a mentor.

Position	Name
Head coach	Hemang Badani
Assistant coach	Matthew Mott
Bowling coach	Munaf Patel
Fielding coach	Anton Roux; Gnaneswara Rao
Mentor	Kevin Pietersen

- Source: Wisden

== League stage ==
Delhi Capitals began their season with four consecutive wins against Lucknow Super Giants, Sunrisers Hyderabad, Chennai Super Kings and Royal Challengers Bengaluru. Then lost to Mumbai Indians, defeated Rajasthan Royals in Super Over, lost to Gujarat Titans, defeated Lucknow again; and lost to Bengaluru and Kolkata Knight Riders. Delhi's eleventh match against Hyderabad was abandoned due to rain. They lost their next two matches against Gujarat and Mumbai to be eliminated from the 2025 IPL; but won in their last match of the season against Punjab Kings.

=== Points table ===
League stage standings
Pos	Grp	Team	Pld	W	L	NR	Pts	NRR	Qualification
1	A	Punjab Kings	14	9	4	1	19	0.372	Advance to Qualifier 1
2	A	Royal Challengers Bengaluru	14	9	4	1	19	0.301	Advance to Qualifier 1
3	B	Gujarat Titans	14	9	5	0	18	0.254	Advance to Eliminator
4	B	Mumbai Indians	14	8	6	0	16	1.142	Advance to Eliminator
5	B	Delhi Capitals	14	7	6	1	15	−0.011	Eliminated
6	B	Sunrisers Hyderabad	14	6	7	1	13	−0.241	Eliminated
7	B	Lucknow Super Giants	14	6	8	0	12	−0.376	Eliminated
8	A	Kolkata Knight Riders	14	5	7	2	12	−0.305	Eliminated
9	A	Rajasthan Royals	14	4	10	0	8	−0.549	Eliminated
10	A	Chennai Super Kings	14	4	10	0	8	−0.647	Eliminated

Source: ESPNcricinfo

=== League progression ===
League progression
Team	Group matches														Playoffs		
Team	1	2	3	4	5	6	7	8	9	10	11	12	13	14	Q1/E	Q2	F
Punjab Kings	2	4	6	8	8	10	10	12	12	12	13	13	13	15			

Win	Loss	No result

- Note: The total points at the end of each group match are listed.
- Note: Click on the points (group matches) or W/L (playoffs) to see the match summary.

=== Fixtures ===
Match 4
24 March 2025
19:30 (N)
Scorecard

Lucknow Super Giants; 209/8 (20 overs)	v	Delhi Capitals (H); 211/9 (19.3 overs)
Nicholas Pooran 75 (30); Mitchell Starc 3/42 (4 overs)		Ashutosh Sharma 66* (31); Shardul Thakur 2/19 (2 overs)

Delhi Capitals won by 1 wicket
ACA–VDCA Cricket Stadium, Visakhapatnam
Umpires: Abhijit Bhattacharya (Ind) and Ulhas Gandhe (Ind)
Player of the match: Ashutosh Sharma (Delhi Capitals)

- Delhi Capitals won the toss and elected to field.
- Vipraj Nigam (Delhi Capitals), Prince Yadav and Digvesh Rathi (Lucknow Super Giants) made their IPL debuts.

Match 10
30 March 2025
15:30 (N)
Scorecard

Sunrisers Hyderabad; 163 (18.4 overs)	v	Delhi Capitals (H); 166/3 (16 overs)
Aniket Verma 74 (41); Mitchell Starc 5/35 (3.4 overs)		Faf du Plessis 50 (27); Zeeshan Ansari 3/42 (4 overs)

Delhi Capitals won by 7 wickets
ACA–VDCA Cricket Stadium, Visakhapatnam
Umpires: Abhijit Bhattacharya (Ind) and Ulhas Gandhe (Ind)
Player of the match: Mitchell Starc (Delhi Capitals)

- Sunrisers Hyderabad won the toss and elected to bat.
- Zeeshan Ansari (Sunrisers Hyderabad) made his IPL debut.

Match 17
5 April 2025
15:30 (D/N)
Scorecard

Delhi Capitals; 183/6 (20 overs)	v	Chennai Super Kings (H); 158/5 (20 overs)
KL Rahul 77 (51); Khaleel Ahmed 2/25 (4 overs)		Vijay Shankar 69* (54); Vipraj Nigam 2/27 (4 overs)

Delhi Capitals won by 25 runs
M. A. Chidambaram Stadium, Chennai
Umpires: Abhijeet Bengeri (Ind) and Parashar Joshi (Ind)
Player of the match: KL Rahul (Delhi Capitals)

- Delhi Capitals won the toss and elected to bat.

Match 24
10 April 2025
19:30 (N)
Scorecard

Royal Challengers Bengaluru (H); 163/7 (20 overs)	v	Delhi Capitals; 169/4 (17.5 overs)
Phil Salt 37 (17); Kuldeep Yadav 2/17 (4 overs)		KL Rahul 93* (53); Bhuvneshwar Kumar 2/26 (4 overs)

Delhi Capitals won by 6 wickets
M. Chinnaswamy Stadium, Bengaluru
Umpires: K. N. Ananthapadmanabhan (Ind) and Saidharshan Kumar (Ind)
Player of the match: KL Rahul (Delhi Capitals)

- Delhi Capitals won the toss and elected to field.

Match 29
13 April 2025
19:30 (N)
Scorecard

Mumbai Indians; 205/5 (20 overs)	v	Delhi Capitals (H); 193 (19 overs)
Tilak Varma 59 (33); Kuldeep Yadav 2/23 (4 overs)		Karun Nair 89 (40); Karn Sharma 3/36 (4 overs)

Mumbai Indians won by 12 runs
Arun Jaitley Stadium, Delhi
Umpires: Chris Gaffaney (NZ) and Vinod Seshan (Ind)
Player of the match: Karn Sharma (Mumbai Indians)

- Delhi Capitals won the toss and elected to field.

Match 32
16 April 2025
19:30 (N)
Scorecard

Delhi Capitals (H); 188/5 (20 overs)	v	Rajasthan Royals; 188/4 (20 overs)
Abhishek Porel 49 (37); Jofra Archer 2/32 (4 overs)		Nitish Rana 51 (28); Axar Patel 1/23 (3 overs)

Match tied
(Delhi Capitals won the Super Over)
Arun Jaitley Stadium, Delhi
Umpires: Keyur Kelkar (Ind) and Akshay Totre (Ind)
Player of the match: Mitchell Starc (Delhi Capitals)

- Rajasthan Royals won the toss and elected to field.
- Super Over: Rajasthan Royals 11/2 (0.5 overs), Delhi Capitals 13/0 (0.4 overs)

Match 35
19 April 2025
15:30 (D/N)
Scorecard

Delhi Capitals; 203/8 (20 overs)	v	Gujarat Titans (H); 204/3 (19.2 overs)
Axar Patel 39 (32); Prasidh Krishna 4/41 (4 overs)		Jos Buttler 97* (54); Kuldeep Yadav 1/30 (4 overs)

Gujarat Titans won by 7 wickets
Narendra Modi Stadium, Ahmedabad
Umpires: Keyur Kelkar (Ind) and Akshay Totre (Ind)
Player of the match: Jos Buttler (Gujarat Titans)

- Gujarat Titans won the toss and elected to field.

Match 40
22 April 2025
19:30 (N)
Scorecard

Lucknow Super Giants (H); 159/6 (20 overs)	v	Delhi Capitals; 161/2 (17.5 overs)
Aiden Markram 52 (33); Mukesh Kumar 4/33 (4 overs)		KL Rahul 57* (42); Aiden Markram 2/30 (3 overs)

Delhi Capitals won by 8 wickets
Ekana Cricket Stadium, Lucknow
Umpires: Kaushik Gandhi (Ind) and Saidharshan Kumar (Ind)
Player of the match: Mukesh Kumar (Delhi Capitals)

- Delhi Capitals won the toss and elected to field.

Match 46
27 April 2025
19:30 (N)
Scorecard

Delhi Capitals (H); 162/8 (20 overs)	v	Royal Challengers Bengaluru; 165/4 (18.3 overs)
KL Rahul 41 (39); Bhuvneshwar Kumar 3/33 (4 overs)		Krunal Pandya 73* (47); Axar Patel 2/19 (4 overs)

Royal Challengers Bengaluru won by 6 wickets
Arun Jaitley Stadium, Delhi
Umpires: Mohit Krishnadas (Ind) and Nitin Menon (Ind)
Player of the match: Krunal Pandya (Royal Challengers Bengaluru)

- Royal Challengers Bengaluru won the toss and elected to field.
- Jacob Bethell (Royal Challengers Bengaluru) made his IPL debut.

Match 48
29 April 2025
19:30 (N)
Scorecard

Kolkata Knight Riders; 204/9 (20 overs)	v	Delhi Capitals (H); 190/9 (20 overs)
Angkrish Raghuvanshi 44 (32); Mitchell Starc 3/43 (4 overs)		Faf du Plessis 62 (45); Sunil Narine 3/29 (4 overs)

Kolkata Knight Riders won by 14 runs
Arun Jaitley Stadium, Delhi
Umpires: Mohit Krishnadas (Ind) and Saidharshan Kumar (Ind)
Player of the match: Sunil Narine (Kolkata Knight Riders)

- Delhi Capitals won the toss and elected to field.

Match 55
5 May 2025
19:30 (N)
Scorecard

Delhi Capitals; 133/7 (20 overs)	v	Sunrisers Hyderabad (H)
Ashutosh Sharma 41 (26); Pat Cummins 3/19 (4 overs)

No result
Rajiv Gandhi International Cricket Stadium, Hyderabad
Umpires: Virender Sharma (Ind) and Kannur Swaroopanand (Ind)

- Sunrisers Hyderabad won the toss and elected to field.
- No further play was possible due to rain.
- Sunrisers Hyderabad were eliminated as a result of this match.

Match N/A
8 May 2025
19:30 (N)

Punjab Kings (H); 122/1 (10.1 overs)	v	Delhi Capitals
Priyansh Arya 70 (34); T. Natarajan 1/4 (1.1 over)

Match abandoned and voided
HPCA Cricket Stadium, Dharamshala
Umpires: Chris Gaffaney (NZ) and Parashar Joshi (Ind)

- Punjab Kings won the toss and elected to bat.
- The match was abandoned midway due to technical and security issues amid the 2025 India–Pakistan crisis.
- After the suspension and rescheduling, it was voided (no points were awarded to the teams) and rescheduled for 24 May as Match 66 at Sawai Mansingh Stadium, Jaipur.

Match 60
18 May 2025
19:30 (N)
Scorecard

Delhi Capitals (H); 199/3 (20 overs)	v	Gujarat Titans; 205/0 (19 overs)
KL Rahul 112* (65); Arshad Khan 1/7 (2 overs)		Sai Sudharsan 108* (61)

Gujarat Titans won by 10 wickets
Arun Jaitley Stadium, Delhi
Umpires: Adrian Holdstock (SA) and Keyur Kelkar (Ind)
Player of the match: Sai Sudharsan (Gujarat Titans)

- Gujarat Titans won the toss and elected to field.
- This match was originally scheduled for 11 May at the same venue, before being rescheduled.
- Gujarat Titans, Royal Challengers Bengaluru and Punjab Kings qualified for the playoffs as a result of this match.

Match 63
21 May 2025
19:30 (N)
Scorecard

Mumbai Indians (H); 180/5 (20 overs)	v	Delhi Capitals; 121 (18.2 overs)
Suryakumar Yadav 73* (43); Mukesh Kumar 2/48 (4 overs)		Sameer Rizvi 39 (35); Mitchell Santner 3/11 (4 overs)

Mumbai Indians won by 59 runs
Wankhede Stadium, Mumbai
Umpires: Abhijeet Bengeri (Ind) and Jayaraman Madanagopal (Ind)
Player of the match: Suryakumar Yadav (Mumbai Indians)

- Delhi Capitals won the toss and elected to field.
- This match was originally scheduled for 15 May at the same venue, before being rescheduled.
- Madhav Tiwari (Delhi Capitals) made his T20 debut.
- Mumbai Indians qualified for the playoffs while Delhi Capitals were eliminated as a result of this match.

Match 66
24 May 2025
19:30 (N)
Scorecard

Punjab Kings (H); 206/8 (20 overs)	v	Delhi Capitals; 208/4 (19.3 overs)
Shreyas Iyer 53 (34); Mustafizur Rahman 3/33 (4 overs)		Sameer Rizvi 58* (25); Harpreet Brar 2/41 (4 overs)

Delhi Capitals won by 6 wickets
Sawai Mansingh Stadium, Jaipur
Umpires: Parashar Joshi (Ind) and Jayaraman Madanagopal (Ind)
Player of the match: Sameer Rizvi (Delhi Capitals)

- Delhi Capitals won the toss and elected to field.
- This match was originally scheduled for 8 May at the HPCA Cricket Stadium but was abandoned midway and voided before being rescheduled.

== Statistics ==
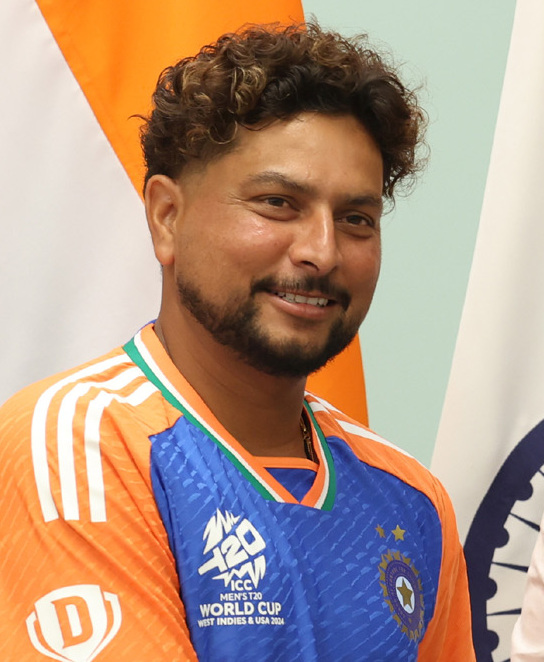
Kuldeep Yadav took the most wickets (15) for Delhi Capitals in the 2025 Indian Premier League.

Most runs
Runs	Player
539	KL Rahul
301	Abhishek Porel
300	Tristan Stubbs
263	Axar Patel
204	Ashutosh Sharma

Most wickets
Wickets	Player
15	Kuldeep Yadav
14	Mitchell Starc
12	Mukesh Kumar
11	Vipraj Nigam
5	Axar Patel
