= 2025 Kolkata Knight Riders season =

Indian Premier League cricket team

Kolkata Knight Riders
2025 season
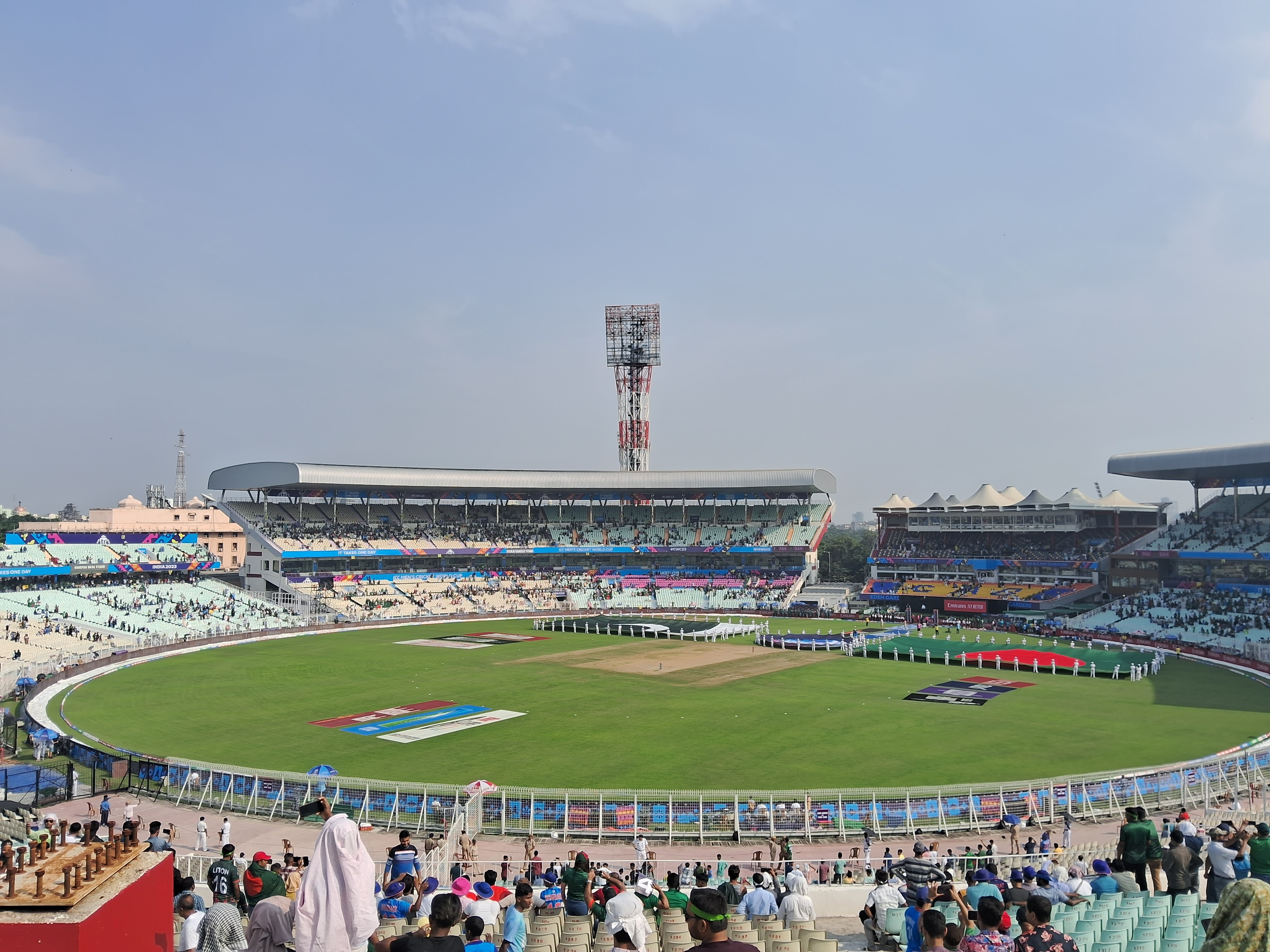
- Eden Gardens, home ground of Kolkata Knight Riders
- Coach: Chandrakant Pandit
- Captain: Ajinkya Rahane
- Ground(s): Eden Gardens, Kolkata
- League stage: 8th place
- Most runs: Ajinkya Rahane (390)
- Most wickets: Varun Chakravarthy; Vaibhav Arora (17 each)
- Most catches: Rinku Singh (9)
- Most wicket-keeping dismissals: Quinton de Kock (3)

The 2025 season was the 18th season for the Indian Premier League (IPL) cricket franchise Kolkata Knight Riders. They were one of the ten teams that competed in the 2025 IPL. They were the defending champions. Ahead of the season, Ajinkya Rahane was announced as the captain, replacing Shreyas Iyer. The team was coached by Chandrakant Pandit.

Kolkata Knight Riders were the fourth team to be eliminated from the 2025 IPL and finished the season in eighth place with five wins from 14 matches. Captain Rahane scored the most runs (390) while Varun Chakravarthy and Vaibhav Arora took the most wickets (17 each) for Kolkata in the 2025 season.

== Pre-season ==
The 2025 Indian Premier League was the 18th edition of the Indian Premier League (IPL), a professional Twenty20 (T20) cricket league, organised by the Board of Control for Cricket in India (BCCI). Kolkata Knight Riders were the defending champions having won their third title in the previous season. The tournament featured ten teams competing in 74 matches from 22 March to 3 June 2025. Kolkata played all their home matches at Eden Gardens.

=== Player retention ===
Franchises were allowed to retain a maximum of six players from their squad, including a maximum of five recent international players. Franchises were required to submit their retention lists before 31 October 2024. Kolkata retained six players, but did not retain their prior captain Shreyas Iyer.

Retained players
No.	Player	Salary
1	Rinku Singh	₹13 crore (US$1.3 million)
2	Varun Chakravarthy	₹12 crore (US$1.2 million)
3	Sunil Narine	₹12 crore (US$1.2 million)
4	Andre Russell	₹12 crore (US$1.2 million)
5	Ramandeep Singh	₹4 crore (US$420,000)
6	Harshit Rana	₹4 crore (US$420,000)

Released players
Batters	Wicket-keepers	All-rounders	Fast bowlers	Spin bowlers
Angkrish Raghuvanshi; Manish Pandey; Nitish Rana; Shreyas Iyer	K. S. Bharat; Phil Salt; Rahmanullah Gurbaz	Anukul Roy; Sherfane Rutherford; Venkatesh Iyer	Chetan Sakariya; Dushmantha Chameera; Mitchell Starc; Sakib Hussain; Vaibhav Arora	Allah Ghazanfar; Suyash Sharma

=== Auction ===
The season's auction took place on 24 and 25 November 2024 in Jeddah, Saudi Arabia. The auction purse for each franchise was set at ₹120 crore (US$12 million), with the franchises being deducted an amount from the purse for each retained player. Kolkata had a purse remaining of ₹51 crore (US$5.3 million). Franchises that did not retain six players, were allowed Right-to-Match (RTM) cards at the auction for each player not retained. Kolkata had no cards left. Kolkata bought fifteen players in the auction, including ten capped players and five overseas players.

== Squad ==
- Players with international caps as of start of 2025 IPL are listed in **bold**.
- Ages are as of 22 March 2025.
- Withdrawn players are indicated by a dagger symbol (†) and placed at the bottom of the table.

Kolkata Knight Riders squad for the 2025 Indian Premier League
S/N	Name	Nationality	Birth date	Batting style	Bowling style	Salary	Notes
2	**Anrich Nortje**	South Africa	16 November 1993 (aged 31)	Right-handed	Right-arm fast	₹6.5 crore (US$670,000)	Overseas
3	**Ajinkya Rahane**	India	6 June 1988 (aged 36)	Right-handed	Right-arm medium	₹1.5 crore (US$160,000)	Captain
9	**Manish Pandey**	India	10 September 1989 (aged 35)	Right-handed	Right-arm medium	₹75 lakh (US$78,000)	
10	**Moeen Ali**	England	18 June 1987 (aged 37)	Left-handed	Right-arm off break	₹2 crore (US$210,000)	Overseas
11	**Mayank Markande**	India	11 November 1997 (aged 27)	Right-handed	Right-arm leg break	₹30 lakh (US$31,000)	
12	**Andre Russell**	West Indies	29 April 1988 (aged 36)	Right-handed	Right-arm fast-medium	₹12 crore (US$1.2 million)	Overseas
13	**Quinton de Kock**	South Africa	17 December 1992 (aged 32)	Left-handed	—N/a	₹3.6 crore (US$370,000)	Overseas
14	Vaibhav Arora	India	14 December 1997 (aged 27)	Right-handed	Right-arm fast medium	₹1.8 crore (US$190,000)	
18	Angkrish Raghuvanshi	India	5 June 2004 (aged 20)	Right-handed	Right-arm off break	₹3 crore (US$310,000)	
19	**Ramandeep Singh**	India	13 April 1997 (aged 27)	Right-handed	Right-arm medium	₹4 crore (US$420,000)	
21	**Rahmanullah Gurbaz**	Afghanistan	28 November 2001 (aged 23)	Right-handed	Right-arm medium fast	₹2 crore (US$210,000)	Overseas
22	**Harshit Rana**	India	22 December 2001 (aged 23)	Right-handed	Right-arm fast medium	₹4 crore (US$420,000)	
25	**Venkatesh Iyer**	India	25 December 1994 (aged 30)	Left-handed	Right-arm medium	₹23.75 crore (US$2.5 million)	
29	**Varun Chakravarthy**	India	29 August 1991 (aged 33)	Right-handed	Right-arm leg break	₹12 crore (US$1.2 million)	
35	**Rinku Singh**	India	12 October 1997 (aged 27)	Left-handed	Right-arm off break	₹13 crore (US$1.3 million)	
45	Anukul Roy	India	30 November 1998 (aged 26)	Left-handed	Slow left-arm orthodox	₹40 lakh (US$42,000)	
47	**Spencer Johnson**	Australia	16 December 1995 (aged 29)	Left-handed	Left-arm fast	₹2.8 crore (US$290,000)	Overseas
55	**Chetan Sakariya**	India	28 February 1998 (aged 27)	Left-handed	Left-arm medium fast	₹75 lakh (US$78,000)	Replacement (Note: Chetan Sakariya replaced Umran Malik, after the latter withdrew due to injury.)
73	Luvnith Sisodia	India	15 January 2000 (aged 25)	Left-handed	—N/a	₹30 lakh (US$31,000)	
74	**Sunil Narine**	West Indies	26 May 1988 (aged 36)	Left-handed	Right-arm off break	₹12 crore (US$1.2 million)	Overseas
—N/a	Shivam Shukla	India	11 December 1995 (aged 29)	Right-handed	Right-arm leg break	₹30 lakh (US$31,000)	Temporary (Note: Kolkata Knight Riders signed Shivam Shukla as temporary replacement, following the IPL's suspension and rescheduling.) replacement (Note: Shivam Shukla replaced Rovman Powell, after the latter withdrew due to tonsils.)
52	**Rovman Powell** †	West Indies	23 July 1993 (aged 31)	Right-handed	Right-arm medium	₹1.5 crore (US$160,000)	Overseas; withdrawn
—N/a	**Umran Malik** †	India	22 November 1999 (aged 25)	Right-handed	Right-arm fast	₹75 lakh (US$78,000)	Withdrawn

== Support staff ==
In September 2024, it was announced that Chennai Super Kings's bowling coach, Dwayne Bravo, would join Kolkata in a mentorship role replacing Gautam Gambhir. In March 2025, Ottis Gibson and Carl Crowe joined Kolkata in an assistant coach and bowling coach roles replacing Abhishek Nayar, Omkar Salvi and Ryan ten Doeschate.

Position	Name
Head coach	Chandrakant Pandit
Assistant coach	Ottis Gibson
Bowling coach	Bharat Arun; Carl Crowe
Mentor	Dwayne Bravo

- Source: Wisden

== League stage ==
Kolkata Knight Riders began their season with a loss against Royal Challengers Bengaluru; won against Rajasthan Royals, lost to Mumbai Indians, defeated Sunrisers Hyderabad, lost to Lucknow Super Giants, defeated Chennai, lost to Punjab Kings and Gujarat Titans. Their next match against Punjab was abandoned due to rain. Kolkata won the next two matches against Delhi Capitals and Rajasthan, but lost to Chennai. Following another abandoned match due to rain against Bengaluru; Kolkata were eliminated from the 2025 IPL. They lost their last match of the season to Hyderabad.

=== Points table ===
League stage standings
Pos	Grp	Team	Pld	W	L	NR	Pts	NRR	Qualification
1	A	Punjab Kings	14	9	4	1	19	0.372	Advance to Qualifier 1
2	A	Royal Challengers Bengaluru	14	9	4	1	19	0.301	Advance to Qualifier 1
3	B	Gujarat Titans	14	9	5	0	18	0.254	Advance to Eliminator
4	B	Mumbai Indians	14	8	6	0	16	1.142	Advance to Eliminator
5	B	Delhi Capitals	14	7	6	1	15	−0.011	Eliminated
6	B	Sunrisers Hyderabad	14	6	7	1	13	−0.241	Eliminated
7	B	Lucknow Super Giants	14	6	8	0	12	−0.376	Eliminated
8	A	Kolkata Knight Riders	14	5	7	2	12	−0.305	Eliminated
9	A	Rajasthan Royals	14	4	10	0	8	−0.549	Eliminated
10	A	Chennai Super Kings	14	4	10	0	8	−0.647	Eliminated

Source: ESPNcricinfo

=== League progression ===
League progression
Team	Group matches														Playoffs		
Team	1	2	3	4	5	6	7	8	9	10	11	12	13	14	Q1/E	Q2	F
Kolkata Knight Riders	0	2	2	4	4	6	6	6	7	9	11	11	12	12			

Win	Loss	No result

- Note: The total points at the end of each group match are listed.
- Note: Click on the points (group matches) or W/L (playoffs) to see the match summary.

=== Fixtures ===
Match 1
22 March 2025
19:30 (N)
Scorecard

Kolkata Knight Riders (H); 174/8 (20 overs)	v	Royal Challengers Bengaluru; 177/3 (16.2 overs)
Ajinkya Rahane 56 (31); Krunal Pandya 3/29 (4 overs)		Virat Kohli 59* (36); Sunil Narine 1/27 (4 overs)

Royal Challengers Bengaluru won by 7 wickets
Eden Gardens, Kolkata
Umpires: Abhijeet Bengeri (Ind) and Vinod Seshan (Ind)
Player of the match: Krunal Pandya (Royal Challengers Bengaluru)

- Royal Challengers Bengaluru won the toss and elected to field.

Match 6
26 March 2025
19:30 (N)
Scorecard

Rajasthan Royals (H); 151/9 (20 overs)	v	Kolkata Knight Riders; 153/2 (17.3 overs)
Dhruv Jurel 33 (28); Varun Chakravarthy 2/17 (4 overs)		Quinton de Kock 97* (61); Wanindu Hasaranga 1/34 (3 overs)

Kolkata Knight Riders won by 8 wickets
ACA Cricket Stadium, Guwahati
Umpires: Rohan Pandit (Ind) and Akshay Totre (Ind)
Player of the match: Quinton de Kock (Kolkata Knight Riders)

- Kolkata Knight Riders won the toss and elected to field.

Match 12
31 March 2025
19:30 (N)
Scorecard

Kolkata Knight Riders; 116 (16.2 overs)	v	Mumbai Indians (H); 121/2 (12.5 overs)
Angkrish Raghuvanshi 26 (16); Ashwani Kumar 4/24 (3 overs)		Ryan Rickelton 62* (41); Andre Russell 2/35 (2.5 overs)

Mumbai Indians won by 8 wickets
Wankhede Stadium, Mumbai
Umpires: Saiyed Khalid (Ind) and Saidharshan Kumar (Ind)
Player of the match: Ashwani Kumar (Mumbai Indians)

- Mumbai Indians won the toss and elected to field.
- Ashwani Kumar (Mumbai Indians) made his IPL debut.

Match 15
3 April 2025
19:30 (N)
Scorecard

Kolkata Knight Riders (H); 200/6 (20 overs)	v	Sunrisers Hyderabad; 120 (16.4 overs)
Venkatesh Iyer 60 (29); Kamindu Mendis 1/4 (1 over)		Heinrich Klaasen 33 (21); Varun Chakravarthy 3/22 (4 overs)

Kolkata Knight Riders won by 80 runs
Eden Gardens, Kolkata
Umpires: Adrian Holdstock (SA) and Akshay Totre (Ind)
Player of the match: Vaibhav Arora (Kolkata Knight Riders)

- Sunrisers Hyderabad won the toss and elected to field.
- Kamindu Mendis (Sunrisers Hyderabad) made his IPL debut.

Match 21
8 April 2025
15:30 (D/N)
Scorecard

Lucknow Super Giants; 238/3 (20 overs)	v	Kolkata Knight Riders (H); 234/7 (20 overs)
Nicholas Pooran 87* (36); Harshit Rana 2/51 (4 overs)		Ajinkya Rahane 61 (35); Shardul Thakur 2/52 (4 overs)

Lucknow Super Giants won by 4 runs
Eden Gardens, Kolkata
Umpires: Adrian Holdstock (SA) and Akshay Totre (Ind)
Player of the match: Nicholas Pooran (Lucknow Super Giants)

- Kolkata Knight Riders won the toss and elected to field.
- This match was originally scheduled for 6 April but was rescheduled to 8 April.

Match 25
11 April 2025
19:30 (N)
Scorecard

Chennai Super Kings (H); 103/9 (20 overs)	v	Kolkata Knight Riders; 107/2 (10.1 overs)
Shivam Dube 31* (29); Sunil Narine 3/13 (4 overs)		Sunil Narine 44 (18); Noor Ahmad 1/8 (2 overs)

Kolkata Knight Riders won by 8 wickets
M. A. Chidambaram Stadium, Chennai
Umpires: Chris Gaffaney (NZ) and Parashar Joshi (Ind)
Player of the match: Sunil Narine (Kolkata Knight Riders)

- Kolkata Knight Riders won the toss and elected to field.

Match 31
15 April 2025
19:30 (N)
Scorecard

Punjab Kings (H); 111 (15.3 overs)	v	Kolkata Knight Riders; 95 (15.1 overs)
Prabhsimran Singh 30 (15); Harshit Rana 3/25 (3 overs)		Angkrish Raghuvanshi 37 (28); Yuzvendra Chahal 4/28 (4 overs)

Punjab Kings won by 16 runs
Maharaja Yadavindra Singh International Cricket Stadium, Mullanpur
Umpires: Mohit Krishnadas (Ind) and Saidharshan Kumar (Ind)
Player of the match: Yuzvendra Chahal (Punjab Kings)

- Punjab Kings won the toss and elected to bat.
- Xavier Bartlett and Josh Inglis (Punjab Kings) made their IPL debuts.

Match 39
21 April 2025
19:30 (N)
Scorecard

Gujarat Titans; 198/3 (20 overs)	v	Kolkata Knight Riders (H); 159/8 (20 overs)
Shubman Gill 90 (55); Andre Russell 1/13 (1 over)		Ajinkya Rahane 50 (36); Prasidh Krishna 2/25 (4 overs); Rashid Khan 2/25 (4 overs)

Gujarat Titans won by 39 runs
Eden Gardens, Kolkata
Umpires: Rohan Pandit (Ind) and Anish Sahasrabudhe (Ind)
Player of the match: Shubman Gill (Gujarat Titans)

- Kolkata Knight Riders won the toss and elected to field.

Match 44
26 April 2025
19:30 (N)
Scorecard

Punjab Kings; 201/4 (20 overs)	v	Kolkata Knight Riders (H); 7/0 (1 over)
Prabhsimran Singh 83 (49); Vaibhav Arora 2/34 (4 overs)		Sunil Narine 4* (3)

No result
Eden Gardens, Kolkata
Umpires: Adrian Holdstock (SA) and Anish Sahasrabudhe (Ind)

- Punjab Kings won the toss and elected to bat.
- No further play was possible due to rain.

Match 48
29 April 2025
19:30 (N)
Scorecard

Kolkata Knight Riders; 204/9 (20 overs)	v	Delhi Capitals (H); 190/9 (20 overs)
Angkrish Raghuvanshi 44 (32); Mitchell Starc 3/43 (4 overs)		Faf du Plessis 62 (45); Sunil Narine 3/29 (4 overs)

Kolkata Knight Riders won by 14 runs
Arun Jaitley Stadium, Delhi
Umpires: Mohit Krishnadas (Ind) and Saidharshan Kumar (Ind)
Player of the match: Sunil Narine (Kolkata Knight Riders)

- Delhi Capitals won the toss and elected to field.

Match 53
4 May 2025
15:30 (D/N)
Scorecard

Kolkata Knight Riders (H); 206/4 (20 overs)	v	Rajasthan Royals; 205/8 (20 overs)
Andre Russell 57* (25); Riyan Parag 1/21 (3 overs)		Riyan Parag 95 (45); Varun Chakravarthy 2/32 (4 overs)

Kolkata Knight Riders won by 1 run
Eden Gardens, Kolkata
Umpires: Rohan Pandit (Ind) and Anish Sahasrabudhe (Ind)
Player of the match: Andre Russell (Kolkata Knight Riders)

- Kolkata Knight Riders won the toss and elected to bat.

Match 57
7 May 2025
19:30 (N)
Scorecard

Kolkata Knight Riders (H); 179/6 (20 overs)	v	Chennai Super Kings; 183/8 (19.4 overs)
Ajinkya Rahane 48 (33); Noor Ahmad 4/31 (4 overs)		Dewald Brevis 52 (25); Vaibhav Arora 3/48 (3 overs)

Chennai Super Kings won by 2 wickets
Eden Gardens, Kolkata
Umpires: Adrian Holdstock (SA) and Anish Sahasrabudhe (Ind)
Player of the match: Noor Ahmad (Chennai Super Kings)

- Kolkata Knight Riders won the toss and elected to bat.
- Urvil Patel (Chennai Super Kings) made his IPL debut.

Match 58
17 May 2025
19:30 (N)
Scorecard

Royal Challengers Bengaluru (H)	v	Kolkata Knight Riders

Match abandoned
M. Chinnaswamy Stadium, Bengaluru
Umpires: K. N. Ananthapadmanabhan (Ind) and Nitin Menon (Ind)

- No toss.
- No play was possible due to rain.
- This match was unchanged by the rescheduling.
- Kolkata Knight Riders were eliminated as a result of this match.

Match 68
25 May 2025
19:30 (N)
Scorecard

Sunrisers Hyderabad (H); 278/3 (20 overs)	v	Kolkata Knight Riders; 168 (18.4 overs)
Heinrich Klaasen 105* (39); Sunil Narine 2/42 (4 overs)		Manish Pandey 37 (23); Jaydev Unadkat 3/24 (4 overs)

Sunrisers Hyderabad won by 110 runs
Arun Jaitley Stadium, Delhi
Umpires: Adrian Holdstock (SA) and Keyur Kelkar (Ind)
Player of the match: Heinrich Klaasen (Sunrisers Hyderabad)

- Sunrisers Hyderabad won the toss and elected to bat.
- This match was originally scheduled for 10 May at the Rajiv Gandhi Stadium, before being rescheduled.

== Statistics ==
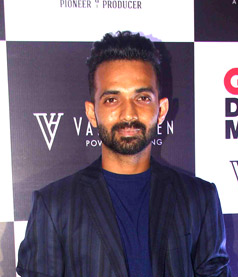
Ajinkya Rahane scored the most runs (390) for Kolkata Knight Riders in the 2025 Indian Premier League.

Most runs
Runs	Player
390	Ajinkya Rahane
300	Angkrish Raghuvanshi
246	Sunil Narine
206	Rinku Singh
167	Andre Russell

Most wickets
Wickets	Player
17	Varun Chakravarthy
17	Vaibhav Arora
15	Harshit Rana
12	Sunil Narine
8	Andre Russell
