= Vaibhav Arora =

Indian cricketer (born 1997)

Personal information
- Full name: Vaibhav Gopal Arora
- Born: 14 December 1997 (age 28); Ambala, Haryana, India
- Nickname: Ambala Express
- Batting: Right-handed
- Bowling: Right arm medium-fast
- Role: Bowler

Domestic team information
- Years: Team
- 2019–present: Himachal Pradesh
- 2021, 2023–present: Kolkata Knight Riders
- 2022: Punjab Kings
- Source: ESPNcricinfo, 4 April 2022

Vaibhav Gopal Arora (born 14 December 1997) is an Indian cricketer who plays for Himachal Pradesh in domestic cricket and Kolkata Knight Riders in the IPL.

Vaibhav made his first-class debut on 9 December 2019, for Himachal Pradesh in the 2019–20 Ranji Trophy. He made his Twenty20 debut on 10 January 2021, for Himachal Pradesh in the 2020–21 Syed Mushtaq Ali Trophy.

In February 2021, Arora was bought by the Kolkata Knight Riders in the IPL auction ahead of the 2021 Indian Premier League. He made his List A debut on 21 February 2021, for Himachal Pradesh in the 2020–21 Vijay Hazare Trophy, taking a hat-trick in the match. In February 2022, he was bought by the Punjab Kings in the auction for the 2022 Indian Premier League tournament.

== Early life and background ==
Vaibhav Arora Born on December 14, 1997, in Ambala, Haryana. He did his schooling from Lord Mahavir Jain Public School, Ambala Cantonment. and DAV Senior Secondary School, Chandigarh. Vaibhav went on to pursue a BA-B.Ed at Chandigarh University.
