= Vipraj Nigam =

Indian cricketer (born 2002)

Personal information
- Born: 28 July 2002 (age 24); Barabanki, Uttar Pradesh, India
- Batting: Right-handed
- Bowling: Right-arm Leg Break
- Role: Bowler

Domestic team information
- Years: Team
- 2024–present: Uttar Pradesh
- 2025-present: Delhi Capitals

Career statistics
Competition	FC	LA	T20
Matches	3	5	15
Runs scored	43	9	118
Batting average	10.75	3.00	16.85
100s/50s	0/0	0/0	0/0
Top score	26	6	39
Balls bowled	629	264	276
Wickets	13	4	15
Bowling average	31.07	55.00	24.93
5 wickets in innings	0	0	0
10 wickets in match	0	0	0
Best bowling	4/81	2/54	2/18
Catches/stumpings	1/–	3/–	3/–
Medal record
Men's cricket
Representing India
Asian Games
Gold medal – first place	2026 Aichi–Nagoya
- Source: Cricinfo, 3 October 2026

Vipraj Nigam (born 28 July 2002) is an Indian cricketer who currently plays for Uttar Pradesh in domestic cricket and Delhi Capitals in the Indian Premier League. He is a right-handed batsman, and a leg-break bowler. He initially impressed by taking 20 wickets in 11 matches. This led to his debut for UP in all three formats. In the Syed Mushtaq Ali Trophy 2024, Nigam smashed 27 off just eight balls to take UP over the line against Andhra and into the quarter finals. While he only picked eight wickets in seven games in SMAT 2024, he went at only 7.12.

== Indian Premier League ==
Nigam was picked for 50 lakh by Delhi Capitals during the mega auction before IPL 2025. He made his IPL debut against Lucknow Super Giants in Vizag, where he picked 1 for 35 off his two overs and scored a 15-ball 39.
