= 2022 Sunrisers Hyderabad season =

Indian Premier League cricket team season

Sunrisers Hyderabad
2022 season
- Coach: Tom Moody
- Captain: Kane Williamson; Bhuvneshwar Kumar (Note: Kumar captained last match of the season as Williamson missed the match due to personal reasons.)
- Ground(s): Rajiv Gandhi International Cricket Stadium, Hyderabad
- IPL: League stage (8th)
- Most runs: Abhishek Sharma (426)
- Most wickets: Umran Malik (22)
- Most catches: Kane Williamson (10)
- Most wicket-keeping dismissals: Nicholas Pooran (9)

Sunrisers Hyderabad (often abbreviated as SRH) are a franchise cricket team based in Hyderabad, Telangana, which plays in the Indian Premier League (IPL). They are one of the ten teams to compete in the 2022 Indian Premier League, making their tenth appearance in all IPL tournaments.

== Background ==
Trevor Bayliss and Brad Haddin stepped down as the head-coach and assistant coach of the Sunrisers Hyderabad following the last-place finish in the 2021 Indian Premier League. VVS Laxman stepped down as mentor to take the job as the Director of Cricket at the National Cricket Academy. On 23 December 2021, Tom Moody, predecessor to Bayliss, was announced as the head-coach of the Sunrisers Hyderabad with Simon Katich appointed as the assistant-coach. Dale Steyn, Brian Lara and Hemang Badani were also appointed as pace-bowling, batting and fielding coaches respectively. Katich left the team after the auction on 18 February 2022 citing bubble fatigue as the reason for his resignation. Sunrisers appointed Simon Helmot as their assistant coach for the IPL 2022. He previously worked under Moody as assistant coach for the Sunrisers between 2013 and 2019.

== Player acquisition ==
In preparation for the 2022 mega-auction, the franchise retained three players and released 25 in November 2021. As a result, they entered the auction with a remaining salary cap of ₹68 crore (US$8.0 million). The auction took place on 12 and 13 February 2022 in Bangalore, with the team acquiring 20 players, almost exhausting their salary cap. Sunrisers released veterans David Warner and Rashid Khan, their highest run scorer and their second highest wicket taker respectively. West Indies international Nicholas Pooran was the team's most expensive signing at purchase price of ₹10.75 crore (US$1.3 million).

Players retained
Kane Williamson, Abdul Samad, Umran Malik.
Players released
David Warner, Manish Pandey, Jonny Bairstow, Wriddhiman Saha, Shreevats Goswami, Priyam Garg, Virat Singh, Rashid Khan, Vijay Shankar, Mohammad Nabi, Abhishek Sharma, Mitchell Marsh, Jason Holder, T. Natarajan, Bhuvneshwar Kumar, Shahbaz Nadeem, Khaleel Ahmed, Siddarth Kaul, Sandeep Sharma, Basil Thampi, Jagadeesha Suchith, Kedar Jadhav, Mujeeb Ur Rahman, Jason Roy, Sherfane Rutherford.
Players acquired
Washington Sundar, Nicholas Pooran, T. Natarajan, Bhuvneshwar Kumar, Priyam Garg, Abhishek Sharma, Kartik Tyagi, Shreyas Gopal, Jagadeesha Suchith, Aiden Markram, Marco Jansen, Romario Shepherd, Sean Abbott, Ravikumar Samarth, Shashank Singh, Saurabh Dubey, Vishnu Vinod, Glenn Phillips, Fazalhaq Farooqi, Rahul Tripathi

== Squad ==
- Players with international caps are listed in **bold**.
- **Year signed** denotes the season the player was signed to the team

| No. | Name | Nationality | Birth date | Batting style | Bowling style | Year signed | Salary | Notes |
Batters
| 11 | Priyam Garg | India | 30 November 2000 (aged 21) | Right-handed | Right-arm medium-fast | 2020 | ₹20 lakh (US$24,000) | |
| 22 | **Kane Williamson** | New Zealand | 8 August 1990 (aged 31) | Right-handed | Right-arm off break | 2015 | ₹14 crore (US$1.7 million) | Captain, Overseas |
| 52 | Rahul Tripathi | India | 2 March 1991 (aged 31) | Right-handed | Right-arm medium-fast | 2022 | ₹8.5 crore (US$1.0 million) | |
| 66 | Ravikumar Samarth | India | 22 January 1993 (aged 29) | Right-handed | Right-arm off break | 2022 | ₹20 lakh (US$24,000) | |
| 94 | **Aiden Markram** | South Africa | 4 October 1994 (aged 27) | Right-handed | Right-arm off break | 2022 | ₹2.6 crore (US$310,000) | Overseas |
All-rounders
| 1 | Abdul Samad | India | 28 October 2001 (aged 20) | Right-handed | Right-arm leg break | 2020 | ₹4 crore (US$470,000) | |
| 4 | Abhishek Sharma | India | 4 September 2000 (aged 21) | Left-handed | Left-arm orthodox | 2019 | ₹6.5 crore (US$770,000) | |
| 5 | **Washington Sundar** | India | 5 October 1999 (aged 22) | Left-handed | Right-arm off break | 2022 | ₹8.75 crore (US$1.0 million) | |
| 21 | Shashank Singh | India | 21 November 1991 (aged 30) | Right-handed | Right-arm off break | 2022 | ₹20 lakh (US$24,000) | |
| 37 | Shreyas Gopal | India | 4 September 1993 (aged 28) | Right-handed | Right arm leg break | 2022 | ₹75 lakh (US$89,000) | |
| 48 | **Romario Shepherd** | Guyana | 26 November 1994 (aged 27) | Right-handed | Right-arm medium-fast | 2022 | ₹7.75 crore (US$920,000) | Overseas |
| 70 | **Marco Jansen** | South Africa | 1 May 2000 (aged 21) | Right-handed | Left-arm fast | 2022 | ₹4.2 crore (US$500,000) | Overseas |
| 77 | **Sean Abbott** | Australia | 29 February 1992 (aged 30) | Right-handed | Right-arm medium-fast | 2022 | ₹2.4 crore (US$280,000) | Overseas |
Wicket-keepers
| 6 | **Glenn Phillips** | New Zealand | 6 December 1996 (aged 25) | Right-handed | Right-arm off break | 2022 | ₹1.5 crore (US$180,000) | Overseas |
| 14 | Vishnu Vinod | India | 2 December 1993 (aged 28) | Right-handed | Right-arm medium-fast | 2022 | ₹50 lakh (US$59,000) | |
| 29 | **Nicholas Pooran** | Trinidad and Tobago | 2 October 1995 (aged 26) | Left-handed | Right-arm off break | 2022 | ₹10.75 crore (US$1.3 million) | Overseas |
Bowlers
| 9 | Kartik Tyagi | India | 8 November 2000 (aged 21) | Right-handed | Right arm fast | 2022 | ₹4 crore (US$470,000) | |
| 15 | **Bhuvneshwar Kumar** | India | 5 February 1990 (aged 32) | Right-handed | Right arm medium-fast | 2014 | ₹4.2 crore (US$500,000) | |
| 24 | Umran Malik | India | 22 November 1999 (aged 22) | Right-handed | Right arm fast | 2021 | ₹4 crore (US$470,000) | |
| 27 | Jagadeesha Suchith | India | 16 January 1994 (aged 28) | Left-handed | Left arm orthodox | 2021 | ₹20 lakh (US$24,000) | |
| 30 | Saurabh Dubey | India | 23 January 1998 (aged 24) | Right-handed | Left-arm medium-fast | 2022 | ₹20 lakh (US$24,000) | Pulled out on 4 May due to injury. |
| 32 | Sushant Mishra | India | 23 December 2000 (aged 21) | Left-handed | Left-arm medium-fast | 2022 | ₹20 lakh (US$24,000) | Replacement for Dubey. |
| 44 | **T. Natarajan** | India | 4 April 1991 (aged 30) | Left-handed | Left arm medium-fast | 2018 | ₹4 crore (US$470,000) | |
| 83 | **Fazalhaq Farooqi** | Afghanistan | 22 September 2000 (aged 21) | Right-handed | Left-arm medium-fast | 2022 | ₹50 lakh (US$59,000) | Overseas |

== Administration and support staff ==
| Position | Name |
|---|---|
| Owner | Kalanithi Maran (Sun Network) |
| CEO | K Shanmughan |
| Head coach | Tom Moody |
| Assistant coach | Simon Helmot |
| Batting coach | Brian Lara |
| Spin bowling coach | Muttiah Muralitharan |
| Pace bowling coach | Dale Steyn |
| Fielding coach | Hemang Badani |

== Kit manufacturers and sponsors ==
On 17 March Sunrisers released their kit including the sponsors list for the 2022 Indian Premier League.

| Kit manufacturer | Shirt sponsor (chest) | Shirt sponsor (back) | Chest branding |
|---|---|---|---|
| Wrogn | CARS24 | BKT | Kent RO |
Source :

T20 uniform

== Indian Premier League ==
A total of ten teams competed in the Indian Premier League in the 2022 season, an increase from eight in the previous season. The teams are divided into two groups of five with the teams being drawn according to the seedings based on their historic performance. Each team plays the other four teams in its own group twice, twice against the team in the same position in the opposite group, one game against each of the remaining teams in the opposite group. There is no relevant home-away formula as the matches are held in bio-secure bubbles across four venues, three in Mumbai and one in Pune, due to the ongoing pandemic. The four teams with the best overall record automatically qualifies for the playoffs.

The format for playoff stage remained same as the previous season where it was played according to the page playoff system and provided top two teams in the league stage with two ways of qualifying for the Final. The top two teams first faced each other in Qualifier 1, the winner of which qualified for the Final. The third and fourth placed teams in league stage faced each other in Eliminator. The loser of Qualifier 1 played against the winner of the Eliminator in Qualifier 2, the winner of which also qualified for the Final. The winner of Final was crowned as the IPL champions.

=== Offseason ===
The fixtures for this season were released on 6 March with the Sunrisers Hyderabad playing their first match against the Rajasthan Royals on 29 March at Maharashtra Cricket Association Stadium in Pune.

== Season overview ==
=== League stage ===
Standings

| Pos | Grp | Team | Pld | W | L | NR | Pts | NRR | Qualification |
|---|---|---|---|---|---|---|---|---|---|
| 1 | B | Gujarat Titans (C) | 14 | 10 | 4 | 0 | 20 | 0.316 | Advanced to Qualifier 1 |
| 2 | A | Rajasthan Royals (R) | 14 | 9 | 5 | 0 | 18 | 0.298 | Advanced to Qualifier 1 |
| 3 | A | Lucknow Super Giants (4th) | 14 | 9 | 5 | 0 | 18 | 0.251 | Advanced to Eliminator |
| 4 | B | Royal Challengers Bangalore (3rd) | 14 | 8 | 6 | 0 | 16 | −0.253 | Advanced to Eliminator |
| 5 | A | Delhi Capitals | 14 | 7 | 7 | 0 | 14 | 0.204 | |
| 6 | B | Punjab Kings | 14 | 7 | 7 | 0 | 14 | 0.126 | |
| 7 | A | Kolkata Knight Riders | 14 | 6 | 8 | 0 | 12 | 0.146 | |
| 8 | B | Sunrisers Hyderabad | 14 | 6 | 8 | 0 | 12 | −0.379 | |
| 9 | B | Chennai Super Kings | 14 | 4 | 10 | 0 | 8 | −0.203 | |
| 10 | A | Mumbai Indians | 14 | 4 | 10 | 0 | 8 | −0.506 | |

Source: IPLT20.com
(C) Champions; (R) Runners-up
The four top-ranked teams qualified for the playoffs.

Results by match

| Round | 1 | 2 | 3 | 4 | 5 | 6 | 7 | 8 | 9 | 10 | 11 | 12 | 13 | 14 |
|---|---|---|---|---|---|---|---|---|---|---|---|---|---|---|
| Ground | H | H | A | H | H | A | A | A | H | A | H | A | A | H |
| Result | L | L | W | W | W | W | W | L | L | L | L | L | W | L |
| Position | 10 | 10 | 8 | 8 | 7 | 4 | 2 | 3 | 3 | 6 | 6 | 8 | 8 | 8 |

Source: Fixtures
A = Away; H = Home; W = Win; D = Draw; L = Loss

== Fixtures ==
=== League stage ===
| 29 March | Rajasthan Royals; 210/6 (20 overs) | v | Sunrisers Hyderabad (H); 149/7 (20 overs) | Rajasthan Royals won by 61 runs |
| 19:30 (D/N) Round 1 Scorecard | Rajasthan Royals; 210/6 (20 overs) | v | Sunrisers Hyderabad (H); 149/7 (20 overs) | Maharashtra Cricket Association Stadium, Pune; Umpires: Ulhas Gandhe (Ind) and Bruce Oxenford (Aus); Player of the match: Sanju Samson (Rajasthan Royals) |
| 19:30 (D/N) Round 1 Scorecard | Sanju Samson 55 (27); Umran Malik 2/39 (4 overs) | | Aiden Markram 57* (41); Yuzvendra Chahal 3/22 (4 overs) | Maharashtra Cricket Association Stadium, Pune; Umpires: Ulhas Gandhe (Ind) and Bruce Oxenford (Aus); Player of the match: Sanju Samson (Rajasthan Royals) |
| Sunrisers Hyderabad won the toss and elected to field. | | | | Maharashtra Cricket Association Stadium, Pune; Umpires: Ulhas Gandhe (Ind) and Bruce Oxenford (Aus); Player of the match: Sanju Samson (Rajasthan Royals) |

| 4 April | Lucknow Super Giants; 169/7 (20 overs) | v | Sunrisers Hyderabad (H); 157/9 (20 overs) | Lucknow Super Giants won by 12 runs |
| 19:30 (D/N) Round 2 Scorecard | Lucknow Super Giants; 169/7 (20 overs) | v | Sunrisers Hyderabad (H); 157/9 (20 overs) | DY Patil Stadium, Navi Mumbai; Umpires: Jayaraman Madanagopal (Ind) and Navdeep Singh (Ind); Player of the match: Avesh Khan (Lucknow Super Giants) |
| 19:30 (D/N) Round 2 Scorecard | KL Rahul 68 (50); T. Natarajan 2/26 (4 overs) | | Rahul Tripathi 44 (30); Avesh Khan 4/24 (4 overs) | DY Patil Stadium, Navi Mumbai; Umpires: Jayaraman Madanagopal (Ind) and Navdeep Singh (Ind); Player of the match: Avesh Khan (Lucknow Super Giants) |
| Sunrisers Hyderabad won the toss and elected to field. | | | | DY Patil Stadium, Navi Mumbai; Umpires: Jayaraman Madanagopal (Ind) and Navdeep Singh (Ind); Player of the match: Avesh Khan (Lucknow Super Giants) |

| 9 April | Chennai Super Kings (H); 154/7 (20 overs) | v | Sunrisers Hyderabad; 155/2 (17.4 overs) | Sunrisers Hyderabad won by 8 wickets |
| 15:30 Round 3 Scorecard | Chennai Super Kings (H); 154/7 (20 overs) | v | Sunrisers Hyderabad; 155/2 (17.4 overs) | DY Patil Stadium, Navi Mumbai; Umpires: Nitin Menon (Ind) and Navdeep Singh (Ind); Player of the match: Abhishek Sharma (Sunrisers Hyderabad) |
| 15:30 Round 3 Scorecard | Moeen Ali 48 (35); Washington Sundar 2/21 (4 overs) | | Abhishek Sharma 75 (50); Dwayne Bravo 1/29 (2.4 overs) | DY Patil Stadium, Navi Mumbai; Umpires: Nitin Menon (Ind) and Navdeep Singh (Ind); Player of the match: Abhishek Sharma (Sunrisers Hyderabad) |
| Sunrisers Hyderabad won the toss and elected to field. | | | | DY Patil Stadium, Navi Mumbai; Umpires: Nitin Menon (Ind) and Navdeep Singh (Ind); Player of the match: Abhishek Sharma (Sunrisers Hyderabad) |

| 11 April | Gujarat Titans; 162/7 (20 overs) | v | Sunrisers Hyderabad (H); 168/2 (19.1 overs) | Sunrisers Hyderabad won by 8 wickets |
| 19:30 (D/N) Round 4 Scorecard | Gujarat Titans; 162/7 (20 overs) | v | Sunrisers Hyderabad (H); 168/2 (19.1 overs) | DY Patil Stadium, Navi Mumbai; Umpires: Chirra Ravikanthreddy (Ind) and Rod Tucker (Aus); Player of the match: Kane Williamson (Sunrisers Hyderabad) |
| 19:30 (D/N) Round 4 Scorecard | Hardik Pandya 50* (42); T. Natarajan 2/34 (4 overs) | | Kane Williamson 57 (46); Hardik Pandya 1/27 (4 overs) | DY Patil Stadium, Navi Mumbai; Umpires: Chirra Ravikanthreddy (Ind) and Rod Tucker (Aus); Player of the match: Kane Williamson (Sunrisers Hyderabad) |
| Sunrisers Hyderabad won the toss and elected to field. | | | | DY Patil Stadium, Navi Mumbai; Umpires: Chirra Ravikanthreddy (Ind) and Rod Tucker (Aus); Player of the match: Kane Williamson (Sunrisers Hyderabad) |

| 15 April | Kolkata Knight Riders; 175/8 (20 overs) | v | Sunrisers Hyderabad (H); 176/3 (17.5 overs) | Sunrisers Hyderabad won by 7 wickets |
| 19:30 (D/N) Round 5 Scorecard | Kolkata Knight Riders; 175/8 (20 overs) | v | Sunrisers Hyderabad (H); 176/3 (17.5 overs) | Brabourne Stadium, Mumbai; Umpires: Sadashiv Iyer (Ind) and Virender Sharma (Ind); Player of the match: Rahul Tripathi (Sunrisers Hyderabad) |
| 19:30 (D/N) Round 5 Scorecard | Nitish Rana 54 (36); T. Natarajan 3/37 (4 overs) | | Rahul Tripathi 71 (37); Andre Russell 2/20 (2 overs) | Brabourne Stadium, Mumbai; Umpires: Sadashiv Iyer (Ind) and Virender Sharma (Ind); Player of the match: Rahul Tripathi (Sunrisers Hyderabad) |
| Sunrisers Hyderabad won the toss and elected to field. | | | | Brabourne Stadium, Mumbai; Umpires: Sadashiv Iyer (Ind) and Virender Sharma (Ind); Player of the match: Rahul Tripathi (Sunrisers Hyderabad) |

| 17 April | Punjab Kings (H); 151 (20 overs) | v | Sunrisers Hyderabad; 152/3 (18.5 overs) | Sunrisers Hyderabad won by 7 wickets |
| 15:30 Round 6 Scorecard | Punjab Kings (H); 151 (20 overs) | v | Sunrisers Hyderabad; 152/3 (18.5 overs) | DY Patil Stadium, Navi Mumbai; Umpires: Rohan Pandit (Ind) and Pashchim Pathak (Ind); Player of the match: Umran Malik (Sunrisers Hyderabad) |
| 15:30 Round 6 Scorecard | Liam Livingstone 60 (33); Umran Malik 4/28 (4 overs) | | Aiden Markram 41* (27); Rahul Chahar 2/28 (4 overs) | DY Patil Stadium, Navi Mumbai; Umpires: Rohan Pandit (Ind) and Pashchim Pathak (Ind); Player of the match: Umran Malik (Sunrisers Hyderabad) |
| Sunrisers Hyderabad won the toss and elected to field. | | | | DY Patil Stadium, Navi Mumbai; Umpires: Rohan Pandit (Ind) and Pashchim Pathak (Ind); Player of the match: Umran Malik (Sunrisers Hyderabad) |

| 23 April | Royal Challengers Bangalore (H); 68 (16.1 overs) | v | Sunrisers Hyderabad; 72/1 (8 overs) | Sunrisers Hyderabad won by 9 wickets |
| 19:30 (D/N) Round 7 Scorecard | Royal Challengers Bangalore (H); 68 (16.1 overs) | v | Sunrisers Hyderabad; 72/1 (8 overs) | Brabourne Stadium, Mumbai; Umpires: Jayaraman Madanagopal (Ind) and Chirra Ravikanthreddy (Ind); Player of the match: Marco Jansen (Sunrisers Hyderabad) |
| 19:30 (D/N) Round 7 Scorecard | Suyash Prabhudessai 15 (20); T. Natarajan 3/10 (3 overs) | | Abhishek Sharma 47 (28); Harshal Patel 1/18 (2 overs) | Brabourne Stadium, Mumbai; Umpires: Jayaraman Madanagopal (Ind) and Chirra Ravikanthreddy (Ind); Player of the match: Marco Jansen (Sunrisers Hyderabad) |
| Sunrisers Hyderabad won the toss and elected to field. | | | | Brabourne Stadium, Mumbai; Umpires: Jayaraman Madanagopal (Ind) and Chirra Ravikanthreddy (Ind); Player of the match: Marco Jansen (Sunrisers Hyderabad) |

| 27 April | Sunrisers Hyderabad; 195/6 (20 overs) | v | Gujarat Titans (H); 199/5 (20 overs) | Gujarat Titans won by 5 wickets |
| 19:30 (D/N) Round 8 Scorecard | Sunrisers Hyderabad; 195/6 (20 overs) | v | Gujarat Titans (H); 199/5 (20 overs) | Wankhede Stadium, Mumbai; Umpires: Chris Gaffaney (NZ) and Navdeep Singh (Ind); Player of the match: Umran Malik (Sunrisers Hyderabad) |
| 19:30 (D/N) Round 8 Scorecard | Abhishek Sharma 65 (42); Mohammed Shami 3/39 (4 overs) | | Wriddhiman Saha 68 (38); Umran Malik 5/25 (4 overs) | Wankhede Stadium, Mumbai; Umpires: Chris Gaffaney (NZ) and Navdeep Singh (Ind); Player of the match: Umran Malik (Sunrisers Hyderabad) |
| Gujarat Titans won the toss and elected to field. | | | | Wankhede Stadium, Mumbai; Umpires: Chris Gaffaney (NZ) and Navdeep Singh (Ind); Player of the match: Umran Malik (Sunrisers Hyderabad) |

| 1 May | Chennai Super Kings; 202/2 (20 overs) | v | Sunrisers Hyderabad (H); 189/6 (20 overs) | Chennai Super Kings won by 13 runs |
| 19:30 (D/N) Round 9 Scorecard | Chennai Super Kings; 202/2 (20 overs) | v | Sunrisers Hyderabad (H); 189/6 (20 overs) | Maharashtra Cricket Association Stadium, Pune; Umpires: K. N. Ananthapadmanabhan (Ind) and Anil Chaudhary (Ind); Player of the match: Ruturaj Gaikwad (Chennai Super Kings) |
| 19:30 (D/N) Round 9 Scorecard | Ruturaj Gaikwad 99 (57); T Natarajan 2/42 (4 overs) | | Nicholas Pooran 64* (33); Mukesh Choudhary 4/46 (4 overs) | Maharashtra Cricket Association Stadium, Pune; Umpires: K. N. Ananthapadmanabhan (Ind) and Anil Chaudhary (Ind); Player of the match: Ruturaj Gaikwad (Chennai Super Kings) |
| Sunrisers Hyderabad won the toss and elected to field. | | | | Maharashtra Cricket Association Stadium, Pune; Umpires: K. N. Ananthapadmanabhan (Ind) and Anil Chaudhary (Ind); Player of the match: Ruturaj Gaikwad (Chennai Super Kings) |

| 5 May | Delhi Capitals (H); 207/3 (20 overs) | v | Sunrisers Hyderabad; 186/8 (20 overs) | Delhi Capitals won by 21 runs |
| 19:30 (D/N) Round 10 Scorecard | Delhi Capitals (H); 207/3 (20 overs) | v | Sunrisers Hyderabad; 186/8 (20 overs) | Brabourne Stadium, Mumbai; Umpires: Nikhil Patwardhan (Ind) and Navdeep Singh (Ind); Player of the match: David Warner (Delhi Capitals) |
| 19:30 (D/N) Round 10 Scorecard | David Warner 92* (58); Bhuvneshwar Kumar 1/25 (4 overs) | | Nicholas Pooran 62 (34); Khaleel Ahmed 3/30 (4 overs) | Brabourne Stadium, Mumbai; Umpires: Nikhil Patwardhan (Ind) and Navdeep Singh (Ind); Player of the match: David Warner (Delhi Capitals) |
| Sunrisers Hyderabad won the toss and elected to field. | | | | Brabourne Stadium, Mumbai; Umpires: Nikhil Patwardhan (Ind) and Navdeep Singh (Ind); Player of the match: David Warner (Delhi Capitals) |

| 8 May | Royal Challengers Bangalore; 192/3 (20 overs) | v | Sunrisers Hyderabad (H); 125 (19.2 overs) | Royal Challengers Bangalore won by 67 runs |
| 15:30 (D/N) Round 11 Scorecard | Royal Challengers Bangalore; 192/3 (20 overs) | v | Sunrisers Hyderabad (H); 125 (19.2 overs) | Wankhede Stadium, Mumbai; Umpires: Marais Erasmus (SA) and Nitin Pandit (Ind); Player of the match: Wanindu Hasaranga (Royal Challengers Bangalore) |
| 15:30 (D/N) Round 11 Scorecard | Faf du Plessis 73* (50); Jagadeesha Suchith 2/30 (4 overs) | | Rahul Tripathi 58 (37); Wanindu Hasaranga 5/18 (4 overs) | Wankhede Stadium, Mumbai; Umpires: Marais Erasmus (SA) and Nitin Pandit (Ind); Player of the match: Wanindu Hasaranga (Royal Challengers Bangalore) |
| Royal Challengers Bangalore won the toss and elected to bat. | | | | Wankhede Stadium, Mumbai; Umpires: Marais Erasmus (SA) and Nitin Pandit (Ind); Player of the match: Wanindu Hasaranga (Royal Challengers Bangalore) |

| 14 May | Kolkata Knight Riders (H); 177/6 (20 overs) | v | Sunrisers Hyderabad; 123/8 (20 overs) | Kolkata Knight Riders won by 54 runs |
| 19:30 (D/N) Round 12 Scorecard | Kolkata Knight Riders (H); 177/6 (20 overs) | v | Sunrisers Hyderabad; 123/8 (20 overs) | MCA International Stadium, Pune; Umpires: K. N. Ananthapadmanabhan (Ind) and Anil Chaudhary (Ind); Player of the match: Andre Russell (Kolkata Knight Riders) |
| 19:30 (D/N) Round 12 Scorecard | Andre Russell 49* (28); Umran Malik 3/33 (4 overs) | | Abhishek Sharma 43 (28); Andre Russell 3/22 (4 overs) | MCA International Stadium, Pune; Umpires: K. N. Ananthapadmanabhan (Ind) and Anil Chaudhary (Ind); Player of the match: Andre Russell (Kolkata Knight Riders) |
| Kolkata Knight Riders won the toss and elected to bat. | | | | MCA International Stadium, Pune; Umpires: K. N. Ananthapadmanabhan (Ind) and Anil Chaudhary (Ind); Player of the match: Andre Russell (Kolkata Knight Riders) |

| 17 May | Sunrisers Hyderabad; 193/6 (20 overs) | v | Mumbai Indians (H); 190/7 (20 overs) | Sunrisers Hyderabad won by 3 runs |
| 19:30 (D/N) Round 13 Scorecard | Sunrisers Hyderabad; 193/6 (20 overs) | v | Mumbai Indians (H); 190/7 (20 overs) | Wankhede Stadium, Mumbai; Umpires: Chris Gaffaney (NZ) and Nitin Pandit (Ind); Player of the match: Rahul Tripathi (Sunrisers Hyderabad) |
| 19:30 (D/N) Round 13 Scorecard | Rahul Tripathi 76 (44); Ramandeep Singh 3/20 (3 overs) | | Rohit Sharma 48 (36); Umran Malik 3/23 (3 overs) | Wankhede Stadium, Mumbai; Umpires: Chris Gaffaney (NZ) and Nitin Pandit (Ind); Player of the match: Rahul Tripathi (Sunrisers Hyderabad) |
| Mumbai Indians won the toss and elected to field. | | | | Wankhede Stadium, Mumbai; Umpires: Chris Gaffaney (NZ) and Nitin Pandit (Ind); Player of the match: Rahul Tripathi (Sunrisers Hyderabad) |

| 22 May | Sunrisers Hyderabad (H); 157/8 (20 overs) | v | Punjab Kings; 160/5 (15.1 overs) | Punjab Kings won by 5 wickets |
| 19:30 (D/N) Round 14 Scorecard | Sunrisers Hyderabad (H); 157/8 (20 overs) | v | Punjab Kings; 160/5 (15.1 overs) | Wankhede Stadium, Mumbai; Umpires: Anil Chaudhary (Ind) and Nikhil Patwardhan (Ind) |
| 19:30 (D/N) Round 14 Scorecard | Abhishek Sharma 43 (32); Harpreet Brar 3/26 (4 overs) | | Liam Livingstone 49* (22); Fazalhaq Farooqi 2/32 (4 overs) | Wankhede Stadium, Mumbai; Umpires: Anil Chaudhary (Ind) and Nikhil Patwardhan (Ind) |
| Sunrisers Hyderabad won the toss and elected to bat. | | | | Wankhede Stadium, Mumbai; Umpires: Anil Chaudhary (Ind) and Nikhil Patwardhan (Ind) |

== Statistics ==
| No. | Name | Mat | Runs | HS | Ave | SR | 100 | 50 | Wkts | BBI | Ave | Eco | 4wi | 5wi | Ct | St |
|---|---|---|---|---|---|---|---|---|---|---|---|---|---|---|---|---|
| 1 | Abdul Samad | 2 | 4 | 4 | 2.00 | 57.14 | 0 | 0 | 0 | – | – | 8.00 | 0 | 0 | 1 | – |
| 4 | Abhishek Sharma | 14 | 426 | 75 | 30.42 | 133.12 | 0 | 2 | 0 | – | – | 9.50 | 0 | 0 | 1 | – |
| 5 | Washington Sundar | 9 | 101 | 40 | 14.42 | 146.37 | 0 | 0 | 6 | 2/21 | 39.83 | 8.53 | 0 | 0 | 1 | – |
| 9 | Kartik Tyagi | 2 | 7 | 7 | 3.50 | 116.66 | 0 | 0 | 1 | 1/42 | 79.00 | 9.87 | 0 | 0 | 0 | – |
| 11 | Priyam Garg | 2 | 46 | 42 | 23.00 | 139.39 | 0 | 0 | – | – | – | – | – | – | 3 | – |
| 15 | Bhuvneshwar Kumar | 14 | 24 | 8 | 8.00 | 92.30 | 0 | 0 | 12 | 3/22 | 31.91 | 7.34 | 0 | 0 | 2 | – |
| 21 | Shashank Singh | 10 | 69 | 25* | 17.25 | 146.80 | 0 | 0 | 0 | – | – | 10.00 | 0 | 0 | 3 | – |
| 22 | Kane Williamson | 13 | 216 | 57 | 19.63 | 93.50 | 0 | 1 | – | – | – | – | – | – | 10 | – |
| 24 | Umran Malik | 14 | 4 | 3* | 4.00 | 50.00 | 0 | 0 | 22 | 5/25 | 20.18 | 9.03 | 1 | 1 | 5 | – |
| 27 | Jagadeesha Suchith | 5 | 2 | 2 | 1.00 | 25.00 | 0 | 0 | 7 | 2/12 | 20.00 | 7.77 | 0 | 0 | 1 | – |
| 29 | Nicholas Pooran | 14 | 306 | 64* | 38.25 | 144.33 | 0 | 2 | – | – | – | – | – | – | 8 | 1 |
| 37 | Shreyas Gopal | 1 | 9 | 9* | – | 128.57 | 0 | 0 | 1 | 1/34 | 34.00 | 11.33 | 0 | 0 | 0 | – |
| 44 | T. Natarajan | 11 | – | – | – | – | – | – | 18 | 3/10 | 22.55 | 9.44 | 0 | 0 | 1 | – |
| 48 | Romario Shepherd | 3 | 58 | 26* | 29.00 | 141.46 | 0 | 0 | 3 | 2/42 | 32.66 | 10.88 | 0 | 0 | 0 | – |
| 52 | Rahul Tripathi | 14 | 413 | 76 | 37.54 | 158.23 | 0 | 3 | – | – | – | – | – | – | 6 | – |
| 70 | Marco Jansen | 8 | 9 | 8* | 9.00 | 128.57 | 0 | 0 | 7 | 3/25 | 39.14 | 8.56 | 0 | 0 | 3 | – |
| 77 | Sean Abbott | 1 | 7 | 7 | 7.00 | 140.00 | 0 | 0 | 1 | 1/47 | 47.00 | 11.75 | 0 | 0 | 1 | – |
| 83 | Fazalhaq Farooqi | 3 | 2 | 2* | – | 25.00 | 0 | 0 | 2 | 2/32 | 55.00 | 9.16 | 0 | 0 | 0 | – |
| 94 | Aiden Markram | 14 | 381 | 68* | 47.62 | 139.05 | 0 | 3 | 1 | 1/8 | 64.00 | 10.66 | 0 | 0 | 6 | – |

Last updated: 28 May 2022.
Source: ESPNcricinfo

== Awards and achievements ==
=== Awards ===
Man of the Match

| No. | Date | Player | Opponent | Venue | Result | Contribution | Ref. |
|---|---|---|---|---|---|---|---|
| 1 | 9 April 2022 | Abhishek Sharma | Chennai Super Kings | Navi Mumbai | Won by 8 wickets | 75 (50) | |
| 2 | 11 April 2022 | Kane Williamson | Gujarat Titans | Navi Mumbai | Won by 8 wickets | 57 (46) | |
| 3 | 15 April 2022 | Rahul Tripathi | Kolkata Knight Riders | Mumbai | Won by 7 wickets | 71 (37) | |
| 4 | 17 April 2022 | Umran Malik | Punjab Kings | Navi Mumbai | Won by 7 wickets | 4/28 (4 overs) & 2 ct | |
| 5 | 23 April 2022 | Marco Jansen | Royal Challengers Bangalore | Mumbai | Won by 9 wickets | 3/25 (4 overs) | |
| 6 | 27 April 2022 | Umran Malik | Gujarat Titans | Mumbai | Lost by 5 wickets | 5/25 (4 overs) | |
| 7 | 17 May 2022 | Rahul Tripathi | Mumbai Indians | Mumbai | Won by 3 runs | 76 (44) | |

=== Achievements ===
- Emerging player of the 2022 IPL : Umran Malik
- Highest strike rate in an innings in the 2022 IPL : Shashank Singh (416.66)

== Reaction ==
The Sunrisers coach Tom Moody said the team lost their winning momentum due to the injuries to their key players, Washington Sundar and T. Natarajan while praising the uncapped Indian trio of Umran Malik, Abhishek Sharma and Rahul Tripathi for their outstanding season. Moody said, "Overall, we are excited with the squad we have got. However, we will make certain adjustments to be stronger in 2023."

On 2 September, Moody parted ways with the team with the current batting coach, Brian Lara, taking over as the head-coach for the 2023 IPL season.
