= 2023 Sunrisers Hyderabad season =

Indian Premier League cricket team season

Sunrisers Hyderabad
2023 season
- Coach: Brian Lara
- Captain: Aiden Markram
- Ground(s): Rajiv Gandhi International Cricket Stadium, Hyderabad
- 2023 Indian Premier League: 10th (last place)
- Most runs: Heinrich Klaasen (448)
- Most wickets: Bhuvneshwar Kumar (16)

Sunrisers Hyderabad (often abbreviated as SRH) is a cricket franchise whose team plays in the Indian Premier League (IPL). Based in Hyderabad, Telangana, they are one of ten teams who competed in IPL 2023. It was their eleventh appearance in the tournament.

== Background ==
Following SRH's eighth-place finish in IPL 2022, Tom Moody stepped down as head coach on 2 September 2022. It was his second stint in the role. Sunrisers had won the fewest matches in the two previous seasons, only nine in all. Brian Lara, SRH batting coach in 2022, has taken over as head coach for IPL 2023.

== Player acquisition ==
Sunrisers announced their retention list on 15 November 2022, releasing twelve players from their squad including Kane Williamson, their captain in the 2022 IPL, and their most-expensive buy in the 2022 IPL auction, West Indian wicket-keeper, Nicholas Pooran. The franchise retained the remaining 12 players from their squad. The team entered the auction with the most money to spend, ₹42.25 crore (US$4.4 million).

Players retained
Abdul Samad, Aiden Markram, Rahul Tripathi, Glenn Phillips, Abhishek Sharma, Marco Jansen, Washington Sundar, Fazalhaq Farooqi, Kartik Tyagi, Bhuvneshwar Kumar, T. Natarajan, Umran Malik.
Players released
Kane Williamson, Nicholas Pooran, Jagadeesha Suchith, Priyam Garg, Ravikumar Samarth, Romario Shepherd, Saurabh Dubey, Sean Abbott, Shashank Singh, Shreyas Gopal, Sushant Mishra, Vishnu Vinod.

Players acquired

Harry Brook, Mayank Agarwal, Heinrich Klaasen, Adil Rashid, Mayank Markande, Vivrant Sharma, Samarth Vyas, Sanvir Singh, Upendra Yadav, Mayank Dagar, Nitish Kumar Reddy, Akeal Hosein, Anmolpreet Singh

== Squad ==
- Players with international caps are listed in **bold**
- Ages given as of 31 March 2023, the date of the first match in the tournament

No.	Name	Nationality	Birth date	Batting style	Bowling style	Year signed	Salary	Notes
Batters
16	**Mayank Agarwal**	India	16 February 1991 (aged 32)	Right-handed	Right-arm off spin	2023	₹8.25 crore (US$860,000)	
52	**Rahul Tripathi**	India	2 March 1991 (aged 32)	Right-handed	Right-arm medium-fast	2022	₹8.5 crore (US$880,000)	
94	**Aiden Markram**	South Africa	4 October 1994 (aged 28)	Right-handed	Right-arm off spin	2022	₹2.6 crore (US$270,000)	Overseas
	Samarth Vyas	India	28 November 1995 (aged 27)	Right-handed	Right-arm leg break	2023	₹20 lakh (US$21,000)	
63	Anmolpreet Singh	India	28 March 1998 (aged 25)	Right-handed	Right-arm off spin	2023	₹20 lakh (US$21,000)	
88	**Harry Brook**	England	22 February 1999 (aged 24)	Right-handed	Right-arm medium	2023	₹13.25 crore (US$1.4 million)	Overseas
1	Abdul Samad	India	28 October 2001 (aged 21)	Right-handed	Right-arm leg break	2020	₹4 crore (US$420,000)	
8	Nitish Kumar Reddy	India	26 May 2003 (aged 19)	Right-handed	Right-arm medium-fast	2023	₹20 lakh (US$21,000)	
Wicket-keepers
45	**Heinrich Klaasen**	South Africa	30 July 1991 (aged 31)	Right-handed	Right-arm off spin	2023	₹5.25 crore (US$550,000)	Overseas
	Upendra Yadav	India	8 October 1996 (aged 26)	Right-handed	Right-arm off spin	2023	₹25 lakh (US$26,000)	
6	**Glenn Phillips**	New Zealand	6 December 1996 (aged 26)	Right-handed	Right-arm off spin	2022	₹1.5 crore (US$160,000)	Overseas
All-rounders
99	Sanvir Singh	India	12 October 1996 (aged 26)	Right-handed	Right-arm medium	2023	₹20 lakh (US$21,000)	
5	**Washington Sundar**	India	5 October 1999 (aged 23)	Left-handed	Right-arm off spin	2022	₹8.75 crore (US$910,000)	
3	Vivrant Sharma	India	30 October 1999 (aged 23)	Left-handed	Left-arm orthodox	2023	₹2.6 crore (US$270,000)	
70	**Marco Jansen**	South Africa	1 May 2000 (aged 22)	Right-handed	Left-arm fast	2022	₹4.2 crore (US$440,000)	Overseas
4	Abhishek Sharma	India	4 September 2000 (aged 22)	Left-handed	Left-arm orthodox	2019	₹6.5 crore (US$670,000)	
Spin bowlers
95	**Adil Rashid**	England	17 February 1988 (aged 35)	Right-handed	Right-arm leg break	2023	₹2 crore (US$210,000)	Overseas
7	**Akeal Hosein**	West Indies	25 April 1993 (aged 29)	Left-handed	Left-arm orthodox	2023	₹1 crore (US$100,000)	Overseas
77	Mayank Dagar	India	11 November 1996 (aged 26)	Right-handed	Left-arm orthodox	2023	₹1.80 crore (US$190,000)	
11	**Mayank Markande**	India	11 November 1997 (aged 25)	Right-handed	Right-arm leg break	2023	₹50 lakh (US$52,000)	
Pace bowlers
15	**Bhuvneshwar Kumar**	India	5 February 1990 (aged 33)	Right-handed	Right arm medium-fast	2014	₹4.2 crore (US$440,000)	
44	**T. Natarajan**	India	4 April 1991 (aged 31)	Left-handed	Left arm medium-fast	2018	₹4 crore (US$420,000)	
24	**Umran Malik**	India	22 November 1999 (aged 23)	Right-handed	Right arm fast	2021	₹4 crore (US$420,000)	
83	**Fazalhaq Farooqi**	Afghanistan	22 September 2000 (aged 22)	Right-handed	Left-arm medium-fast	2022	₹50 lakh (US$52,000)	Overseas
9	Kartik Tyagi	India	8 November 2000 (aged 22)	Right-handed	Right arm fast	2022	₹4 crore (US$420,000)	

- Source: Sunrisers Hyderabad

== Administration and support staff ==
Position	Name
CEO	K Shanmughan
Head coach	Brian Lara
Assistant coach	Simon Helmot
Spin-bowling coach	Muttiah Muralitharan
Fast bowling coach	Dale Steyn
Fielding coach	Hemang Badani

== Season overview ==
Pos	Grp	Team	Pld	W	L	NR	Pts	NRR	Qualification
1	B	Gujarat Titans (R)	14	10	4	0	20	0.809	Advanced to Qualifier 1
2	B	Chennai Super Kings (C)	14	8	5	1	17	0.652	Advanced to Qualifier 1
3	A	Lucknow Super Giants (4th)	14	8	5	1	17	0.284	Advanced to Eliminator
4	A	Mumbai Indians (3rd)	14	8	6	0	16	−0.044	Advanced to Eliminator
5	A	Rajasthan Royals	14	7	7	0	14	0.148	
6	B	Royal Challengers Bangalore	14	7	7	0	14	0.135	
7	A	Kolkata Knight Riders	14	6	8	0	12	−0.239	
8	B	Punjab Kings	14	6	8	0	12	−0.304	
9	A	Delhi Capitals	14	5	9	0	10	−0.808	
10	B	Sunrisers Hyderabad	14	4	10	0	8	−0.590	

Source: Indian Premier League

The four top-ranked teams will qualify for the Playoffs.
Advance to Qualifier 1
Advance to Eliminator

=== Results by match ===
Round	1	2	3	4	5	6	7	8	9	10	11	12	13	14
Ground	H	A	H	A	H	A	H	A	H	A	H	A	H	A
Result	L	L	W	W	L	L	L	W	L	W	L	L	L	L
Position	10	10	8	7	9	9	9	8	9	9	9	9	10	10

== League Stage ==
Match 4
2 April 2023
15:30 (D/N)
Scorecard

Rajasthan Royals; 203/5 (20 overs)	v	Sunrisers Hyderabad (H); 131/8 (20 overs)
Sanju Samson 55 (32); T. Natarajan 2/23 (3 overs)		Abdul Samad 32* (32); Yuzvendra Chahal 4/17 (4 overs)

Rajasthan Royals won by 72 runs
Rajiv Gandhi International Cricket Stadium, Hyderabad
Umpires: K. N. Ananthapadmanabhan (Ind) and Rohan Pandit (Ind)
Player of the match: Jos Buttler (Rajasthan Royals)

- Sunrisers Hyderabad won the toss and elected to field.

Match 10
7 April 2023
19:30 (N)
Scorecard

Sunrisers Hyderabad; 121/8 (20 overs)	v	Lucknow Super Giants (H); 127/5 (16 overs)
Rahul Tripathi 34 (41); Krunal Pandya 3/18 (4 overs)		KL Rahul 35 (31); Adil Rashid 2/23 (3 overs)

Lucknow Super Giants won by 5 wickets
BRSABV Ekana Cricket Stadium, Lucknow
Umpires: Yeshwant Barde (Ind) and Jayaraman Madanagopal (Ind)
Player of the match: Krunal Pandya (Lucknow Super Giants)

- Sunrisers Hyderabad won the toss and elected to bat.

Match 14
9 April 2023
19:30 (N)
Scorecard

Punjab Kings; 143/9 (20 overs)	v	Sunrisers Hyderabad (H); 145/2 (17.1 overs)
Shikhar Dhawan 99* (66); Mayank Markande 4/15 (4 overs)		Rahul Tripathi 74* (48); Arshdeep Singh 1/20 (3 overs)

Sunrisers Hyderabad won by 8 wickets
Rajiv Gandhi International Cricket Stadium, Hyderabad
Umpires: Ulhas Gandhe (Ind) and Bruce Oxenford (Aus)
Player of the match: Shikhar Dhawan (Punjab Kings)

- Sunrisers Hyderabad won the toss and elected to field.
- Mohit Rathee (Punjab Kings) made his T20 debut.

Match 19
14 April 2023
19:30 (N)
Scorecard

Sunrisers Hyderabad; 228/4 (20 overs)	v	Kolkata Knight Riders (H); 205/7 (20 overs)
Harry Brook 100* (55); Andre Russell 3/22 (2.1 overs)		Nitish Rana 75 (41); Mayank Markande 2/27 (4 overs)

Sunrisers Hyderabad won by 23 runs
Eden Gardens, Kolkata
Umpires: Chris Gaffaney (NZ) and Sadashiv Iyer (Ind)
Player of the match: Harry Brook (Sunrisers Hyderabad)

- Kolkata Knight Riders won the toss and elected to field.
- Harry Brook (Sunrisers Hyderabad) scored his maiden IPL century.

Match 25
18 April 2023
19:30 (N)
Scorecard

Mumbai Indians; 192/5 (20 overs)	v	Sunrisers Hyderabad (H); 178 (19.5 overs)
Cameron Green 64* (40); Marco Jansen 2/43 (4 overs)		Mayank Agarwal 48 (41); Riley Meredith 2/33 (4 overs)

Mumbai Indians won by 14 runs
Rajiv Gandhi International Stadium, Hyderabad
Umpires: Nitin Menon (Ind) and Vinod Seshan (Ind)
Player of the match: Cameron Green (Mumbai Indians)

- Sunrisers Hyderabad won the toss and elected to field.

Match 29
21 April 2023
19:30 (N)
Scorecard

Sunrisers Hyderabad; 134/7 (20 overs)	v	Chennai Super Kings (H); 138/3 (18.4 overs)
Abhishek Sharma 34 (26); Ravindra Jadeja 3/22 (4 overs)		Devon Conway 77* (57); Mayank Markande 2/23 (4 overs)

Chennai Super Kings won by 7 wickets
M. A. Chidambaram Stadium, Chennai
Umpires: Saiyed Khalid (Ind) and Virender Sharma (Ind)
Player of the match: Ravindra Jadeja (Chennai Super Kings)

- Chennai Super Kings won the toss and elected to field.

Match 34
24 April 2023
19:30 (N)
Scorecard

Delhi Capitals; 144/9 (20 overs)	v	Sunrisers Hyderabad (H); 137/6 (20 overs)
Manish Pandey 34 (27); Washington Sundar 3/28 (4 overs)		Mayank Agarwal 49 (39); Axar Patel 2/21 (4 overs)

Delhi Capitals won by 7 runs
Rajiv Gandhi International Cricket Stadium, Hyderabad
Umpires: Jayaraman Madanagopal (Ind) and Rod Tucker (Aus)
Player of the match: Axar Patel (Delhi Capitals)

- Delhi Capitals won the toss and elected to bat.

Match 40
29 April 2023
19:30 (N)
Scorecard

Sunrisers Hyderabad; 197/6 (20 overs)	v	Delhi Capitals (H); 188/6 (20 overs)
Abhishek Sharma 67 (36); Mitchell Marsh 4/27 (4 overs)		Mitchell Marsh 63 (39); Mayank Markande 2/20 (4 overs)

Sunrisers Hyderabad won by 9 runs
Arun Jaitley Stadium, Delhi
Umpires: Michael Gough (Eng) and Navdeep Singh (Ind)
Player of the match: Mitchell Marsh (Delhi Capitals)

- Sunrisers Hyderabad won the toss and elected to bat.

Match 47
4 May 2023
19:30 (N)
Scorecard

Kolkata Knight Riders; 171/9 (20 overs)	v	Sunrisers Hyderabad (H); 166/8 (20 overs)
Rinku Singh 46 (35); Marco Jansen 2/24 (3 overs)		Aiden Markram 41 (40); Shardul Thakur 2/23 (3 overs)

Kolkata Knight Riders won by 5 runs
Rajiv Gandhi International Cricket Stadium, Hyderabad
Umpires: K. N. Ananthapadmanabhan (Ind) and Michael Gough (Eng)
Player of the match: Varun Chakravarthy (Kolkata Knight Riders)

- Kolkata Knight Riders won the toss and elected to bat.

Match 52
7 May 2023
19:30 (D/N)
Scorecard

(H) Rajasthan Royals; 214/2 (20 overs)	v	Sunrisers Hyderabad; 217/6 (20 overs)
Jos Buttler 95 (59); Marco Jansen 1/44 (4 overs); Bhuvneshwar Kumar 1/44 (4 overs)		Abhishek Sharma 55 (34); Yuzvendra Chahal 4/29 (4 overs)

Sunrisers Hyderabad won by 4 wickets
Sawai Mansingh Stadium, Jaipur
Umpires: Nitin Menon (Ind) and Vinod Seshan (Ind)
Player of the match: Glenn Phillips (Sunrisers Hyderabad)

- Rajasthan Royals won the toss and elected to bat.

Match 58
13 May 2023
15:30 (D/N)
Scorecard

(H) Sunrisers Hyderabad; 182/6 (20 overs)	v	Lucknow Super Giants; 185/3 (19.2 overs)
Heinrich Klaasen 47 (29); Krunal Pandya 2/24 (4 overs)		Prerak Mankad 64* (45); Glenn Phillips 1/10 (2 overs)

Lucknow Super Giants won by 7 wickets
Rajiv Gandhi International Stadium, Hyderabad
Umpires: Jayaraman Madanagopal (Ind) and Akshay Totre (Ind)
Player of the match: Prerak Mankad (Lucknow Super Giants)

- Sunrisers Hyderabad won the toss and elected to bat.

Match 62
15 May 2023
19:30 (N)
Scorecard

(H) Gujarat Titans; 188/9 (20 overs)	v	Sunrisers Hyderabad; 154/9 (20 overs)
Shubman Gill 101 (58); Bhuvneshwar Kumar 5/30 (4 overs)		Heinrich Klaasen 64 (44); Mohammed Shami 4/21 (4 overs)

Gujarat Titans won by 34 runs
Narendra Modi Stadium, Ahmedabad
Umpires: Ulhas Gandhe (Ind) and Jayaraman Madanagopal (Ind)
Player of the match: Shubman Gill (Gujarat Titans)

- Sunrisers Hyderabad won the toss and elected to field.
- Gujarat Titans qualified for the playoffs and Sunrisers Hyderabad were eliminated as a result of this match
- Shubman Gill scored his maiden IPL century.

Match 65
18 May 2023
19:30 (N)
Scorecard

(H) Sunrisers Hyderabad; 186/5 (20 overs)	v	Royal Challengers Bangalore; 187/2 (19.2 overs)
Heinrich Klaasen 104 (51); Michael Bracewell 2/13 (2 overs)		Virat Kohli 100 (63); T. Natarajan 1/34 (4 overs)

Royal Challengers Bangalore won by 8 wickets
Rajiv Gandhi International Stadium, Hyderabad
Umpires: Bruce Oxenford (Aus) and Virender Sharma (Ind)
Player of the match: Virat Kohli (Royal Challengers Bangalore)

- Royal Challengers Bangalore won the toss and elected to field.
- Heinrich Klaasen (Sunrisers Hyderabad) scored his maiden IPL century.

Match 69
21 May 2023
15:30 (D/N)
Scorecard

Sunrisers Hyderabad; 200/5 (20 overs)	v	Mumbai Indians (H); 201/2 (18 overs)
Mayank Agarwal 83 (46); Akash Madhwal 4/37 (4 overs)		Cameron Green 100* (47); Bhuvneshwar Kumar 1/26 (4 overs)

Mumbai Indians won by 8 wickets
Wankhede Stadium, Mumbai
Umpires: K. N. Ananthapadmanabhan (Ind) and Rod Tucker (Aus)
Player of the match: Cameron Green (Mumbai Indians)

- Mumbai Indians won the toss and elected to field.
- Cameron Green (Mumbai Indians) scored his maiden IPL century.
- Rajasthan Royals were eliminated as a result of this match.
