= 2026 Sunrisers Hyderabad season =

Indian Premier League cricket team

Sunrisers Hyderabad
2026 season
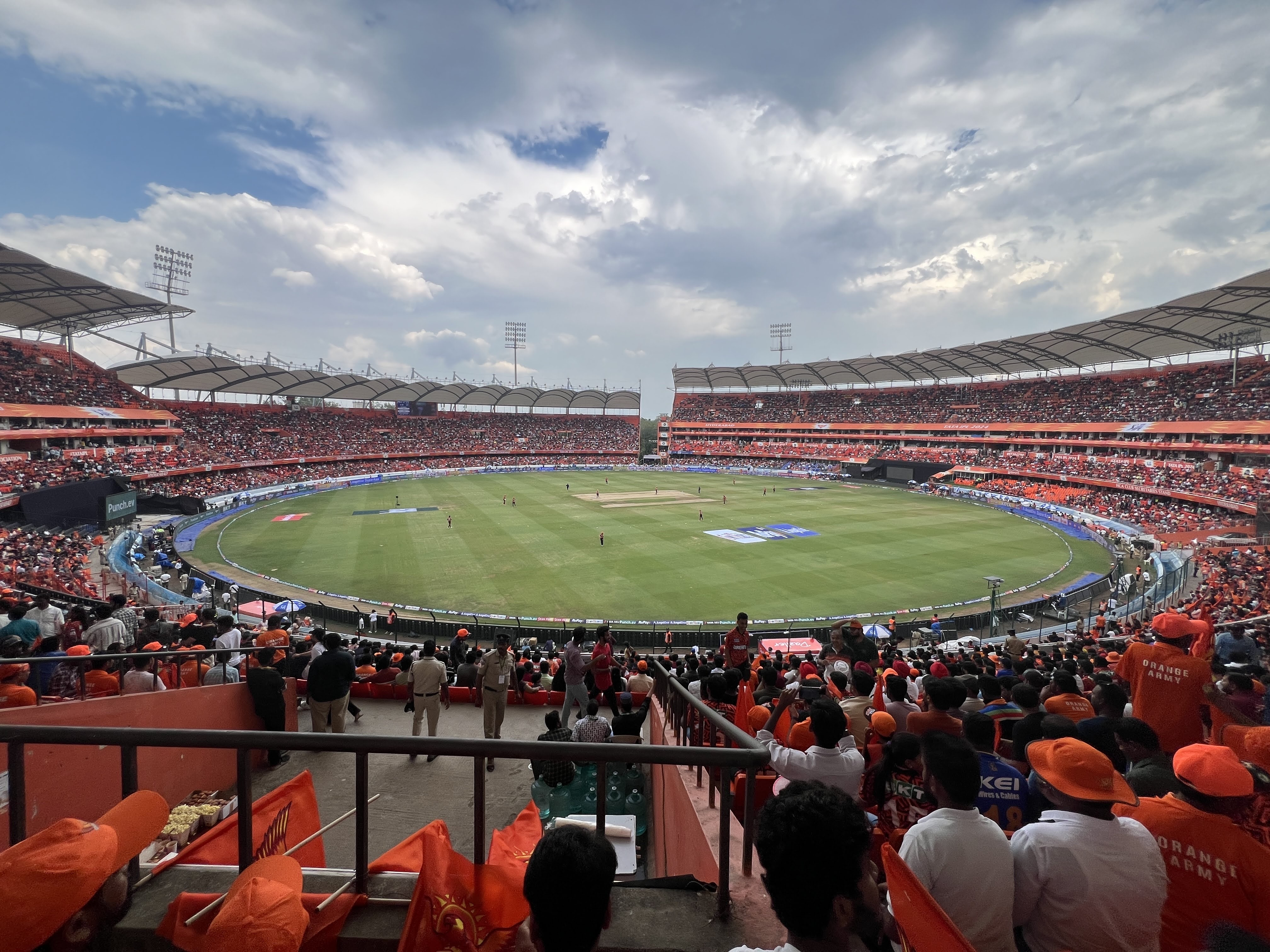
- Rajiv Gandhi Stadium, home ground of Sunrisers Hyderabad
- Coach: Daniel Vettori
- Captain: Pat Cummins
- Ground(s): Rajiv Gandhi Stadium, Hyderabad
- League stage: 3rd place
- Eliminator: Lost to Rajasthan Royals
- Most runs: Heinrich Klaasen (624)
- Most wickets: Eshan Malinga (20)
- Most catches: Heinrich Klaasen (13)
- Most wicket-keeping dismissals: Ishan Kishan (8)

The 2026 season was Sunrisers Hyderabad's fourteenth appearance in the Indian Premier League (IPL). They were one of the ten cricket teams that competed in the 2026 IPL. The team was captained by Pat Cummins and coached by Daniel Vettori.

Sunrisers Hyderabad finished in third place in the league stage, and advanced to Eliminator in the playoffs. However, they lost to Rajasthan Royals in Eliminator. Heinrich Klaasen scored the most runs (624) while Eshan Malinga took the most wickets (20) for Hyderabad in the 2026 season.

== Pre-season ==
The 2026 Indian Premier League was the 19th edition of the Indian Premier League (IPL), a professional Twenty20 (T20) cricket league held in India, organised by the Board of Control for Cricket in India (BCCI). Sunrisers Hyderabad had previously won the title once in 2016. The team finished in sixth place in the previous season. The tournament featured ten teams competing in 74 matches from 28 March to 31 May 2026. Hyderabad played all of their home matches at Rajiv Gandhi Stadium.

=== Player retention ===
Franchises were allowed to retain any number of players from their squad, including traded players while excluding players signed as temporary replacements. Franchises were required to submit their retention lists before 15 November 2025. Hyderabad retained fifteen players, including captain Pat Cummins. Hyderabad also traded Mohammed Shami to Lucknow Super Giants.

Retained players
| Domestic | | Overseas |
|---|---|---|
| Zeeshan Ansari; Harsh Dubey; Ishan Kishan; Harshal Patel | Smaran Ravichandran; Nitish Kumar Reddy; Abhishek Sharma; Jaydev Unadkat; Aniket Verma | Brydon Carse; Pat Cummins; Travis Head; Heinrich Klaasen; Eshan Malinga; Kamindu Mendis |

Released players
| Batters | Wicket-keepers | All-rounders | Bowlers |
|---|---|---|---|
| Sachin Baby | —N/a | Abhinav Manohar; Wiaan Mulder; Atharva Taide | Rahul Chahar; Mohammed Shami (Note: Sunrisers Hyderabad traded Mohammed Shami to Lucknow Super Giants.); Simarjeet Singh; Adam Zampa |

=== Auction ===
The season's auction took place on 16 December 2025 in Abu Dhabi, United Arab Emirates. The auction purse for each franchise was set at ₹125 crore (US$13 million), with franchises being deducted an amount from the purse for every retained player. Hyderabad had a purse remaining of ₹25.5 crore (US$2.6 million). Hyderabad bought ten players in the auction, including two capped players and two overseas players.

Auctioned players
| Domestic | | Overseas | |
| Capped | Uncapped | Capped | Uncapped |
|---|---|---|---|
| Shivam Mavi | Salil Arora; Krains Fuletra; Praful Hinge; Sakib Hussain; Amit Kumar; Shivang Kumar; Onkar Tarmale | Liam Livingstone | Jack Edwards |

== Squad ==
- Players with international caps as of start of 2026 IPL are listed in **bold**.
- Ages are as of 28 March 2026.
- Withdrawn players are indicated by a dagger symbol (†) and placed at the bottom of the table.

Sunrisers Hyderabad squad for the 2026 Indian Premier League
| S/N | Name | Nationality | Birth date | Batting style | Bowling style | Salary | Notes |
|---|---|---|---|---|---|---|---|
| 4 | **Abhishek Sharma** | India | 4 September 2000 (aged 25) | Left-handed | Left-arm orthodox | ₹14 crore (US$1.5 million) | |
| 7 | Harsh Dubey | India | 23 May 2002 (aged 23) | Left-handed | Left-arm orthodox | ₹30 lakh (US$31,000) | |
| 10 | Smaran Ravichandran | India | 5 May 2003 (aged 22) | Left-handed | Right-arm off break | ₹30 lakh (US$31,000) | |
| 15 | Salil Arora | India | 7 November 2002 (aged 23) | Right-handed | —N/a | ₹1.5 crore (US$160,000) | |
| 16 | **Harshal Patel** | India | 23 November 1990 (aged 35) | Right-handed | Right arm medium-fast | ₹8 crore (US$830,000) | |
| 18 | Praful Hinge | India | 18 January 2002 (aged 24) | Right-handed | Right arm fast-medium | ₹30 lakh (US$31,000) | |
| 21 | **Kamindu Mendis** | Sri Lanka | 30 September 1998 (aged 27) | Right-handed | Right-arm off break | ₹75 lakh (US$78,000) | Overseas |
| 23 | **Ishan Kishan** | India | 18 July 1998 (aged 27) | Left-handed | —N/a | ₹11.25 crore (US$1.2 million) | Stand-in captain (Note: Ishan Kishan captained Sunrisers Hyderabad for the first half of the season (first 7 matches) when Pat Cummins was unavailable.) |
| 27 | Zeeshan Ansari | India | 16 December 1999 (aged 26) | Right-handed | Right-arm leg break | ₹40 lakh (US$42,000) | |
| 30 | **Pat Cummins** | Australia | 8 March 1993 (aged 33) | Right-handed | Right arm fast | ₹18 crore (US$1.9 million) | Captain; overseas |
| 37 | Krains Fuletra | India | 19 June 2004 (aged 21) | Right-handed | Right-arm unorthodox | ₹30 lakh (US$31,000) | |
| 45 | **Heinrich Klaasen** | South Africa | 30 July 1991 (aged 34) | Right-handed | Right-arm off spin | ₹23 crore (US$2.4 million) | Overseas |
| 57 | Sakib Hussain | India | 14 December 2004 (aged 21) | Right-handed | Right arm fast | ₹30 lakh (US$31,000) | |
| 62 | **Travis Head** | Australia | 29 December 1993 (aged 32) | Left-handed | Right-arm off break | ₹14 crore (US$1.5 million) | Overseas |
| 67 | Shivang Kumar | India | 26 May 2002 (aged 23) | Right-handed | Left-arm unorthodox | ₹30 lakh (US$31,000) | |
| 77 | Amit Kumar | India | 2 November 2002 (aged 23) | Right-handed | Right-arm leg break | ₹30 lakh (US$31,000) | |
| 88 | **Nitish Kumar Reddy** | India | 26 May 2003 (aged 22) | Right-handed | Right-arm medium-fast | ₹6 crore (US$620,000) | |
| 91 | **Jaydev Unadkat** | India | 18 October 1991 (aged 34) | Right-handed | Left-arm medium-fast | ₹1 crore (US$100,000) | |
| 93 | Onkar Tarmale | India | 22 August 2002 (aged 23) | Right-handed | Right arm medium-fast | ₹30 lakh (US$31,000) | |
| 97 | **Eshan Malinga** | Sri Lanka | 4 February 2001 (aged 25) | Right-handed | Right-arm fast-medium | ₹1.2 crore (US$120,000) | Overseas |
| 108 | Aniket Verma | India | 5 February 2002 (aged 24) | Right-handed | Right arm medium-fast | ₹30 lakh (US$31,000) | |
| —N/a | RS Ambrish | India | 28 May 2007 (aged 18) | Left-handed | Right-arm medium | ₹45 lakh (US$47,000) | Replacement (Note: RS Ambrish replaced Shivam Mavi, after the latter withdrew due to groin injury.) |
| —N/a | Gerald Coetzee | South Africa | 2 October 2000 (aged 25) | Right-handed | Right-arm fast | ₹2 crore (US$210,000) | Overseas; replacement (Note: Gerald Coetzee replaced David Payne, after the latter withdrew due to ankle injury.) |
| —N/a | **Liam Livingstone** | England | 4 August 1993 (aged 32) | Right-handed | Right-arm leg break | ₹13 crore (US$1.3 million) | Overseas |
| —N/a | Dilshan Madushanka | Sri Lanka | 18 September 2000 (aged 25) | Right-handed | Left-arm fast-medium | ₹75 lakh (US$78,000) | Overseas; replacement (Note: Dilshan Madushanka replaced Brydon Carse, after the latter withdrew due to injury.) |
| 25 | **Shivam Mavi** † | India | 26 November 1998 (aged 27) | Right-handed | Right arm fast-medium | ₹75 lakh (US$78,000) | Withdrawn |
| 32 | **Jack Edwards** † | Australia | 19 April 2000 (aged 25) | Right-handed | Right-arm medium | ₹3 crore (US$310,000) | Overseas; withdrawn (Note: David Payne replaced Jack Edwards, after the latter withdrew due to foot injury.) |
| 92 | **Brydon Carse** † | England | 31 July 1995 (aged 30) | Right-handed | Right-arm fast | ₹1 crore (US$100,000) | Overseas; withdrawn |
| —N/a | David Payne † | England | 15 February 1991 (aged 35) | Right-handed | Left-arm fast-medium | ₹1.5 crore (US$160,000) | Overseas; replacement; withdrawn |

== Support staff ==
Varun Aaron replaced James Franklin as bowling coach while Simon Helmot and Hariesh Jaikumar joined the squad as assistant and batting coaches respectively.

| Position | Name |
|---|---|
| Head coach | Daniel Vettori |
| Assistant coach | Simon Helmot |
| Batting coach | Hariesh Jaikumar |
| Bowling coach | Varun Aaron; Muttiah Muralitharan |

- Source: News18

== League stage ==
Sunrisers Hyderabad began their season with a loss to Royal Challengers Bengaluru, a win against Kolkata Knight Riders and two losses to Lucknow and Punjab Kings. They won their next five matches against Rajasthan Royals, Chennai Super Kings, Delhi Capitals, Rajasthan and Mumbai Indians; lost to Kolkata, won against Punjab and lost to Gujarat Titans. They won their last two matches against Channai and Bengaluru to finish the league stage in third place with nine wins from 14 matches, and advanced to Eliminator in the playoffs.

=== Points table ===
League stage standings
| Pos | Grp | Team | Pld | W | L | NR | Pts | NRR | Qualification |
|---|---|---|---|---|---|---|---|---|---|
| 1 | A | Royal Challengers Bengaluru (C) | 14 | 9 | 5 | 0 | 18 | 0.783 | Advanced to Qualifier 1 |
| 2 | B | Gujarat Titans (R) | 14 | 9 | 5 | 0 | 18 | 0.695 | Advanced to Qualifier 1 |
| 3 | B | Sunrisers Hyderabad (4th) | 14 | 9 | 5 | 0 | 18 | 0.524 | Advanced to Eliminator |
| 4 | A | Rajasthan Royals (3rd) | 14 | 8 | 6 | 0 | 16 | 0.189 | Advanced to Eliminator |
| 5 | A | Punjab Kings | 14 | 7 | 6 | 1 | 15 | 0.309 | Eliminated |
| 6 | B | Delhi Capitals | 14 | 7 | 7 | 0 | 14 | −0.651 | Eliminated |
| 7 | A | Kolkata Knight Riders | 14 | 6 | 7 | 1 | 13 | −0.147 | Eliminated |
| 8 | A | Chennai Super Kings | 14 | 6 | 8 | 0 | 12 | −0.345 | Eliminated |
| 9 | B | Mumbai Indians | 14 | 4 | 10 | 0 | 8 | −0.584 | Eliminated |
| 10 | B | Lucknow Super Giants | 14 | 4 | 10 | 0 | 8 | −0.740 | Eliminated |

Source: ESPNcricinfo
Rules for classification: 1) Points; 2) Wins; 3) Net run rate; 4) Wickets taken per fair deliveries; 5) drawing lots
(C) Champions; (R) Runners-up

=== League progression ===
League progression
| Team | Group matches | | | | | | | | | | | | | | Playoffs | | |
| Team | 1 | 2 | 3 | 4 | 5 | 6 | 7 | 8 | 9 | 10 | 11 | 12 | 13 | 14 | Q1/E | Q2 | F |
|---|---|---|---|---|---|---|---|---|---|---|---|---|---|---|---|---|---|
| Sunrisers Hyderabad | 0 | 2 | 2 | 2 | 4 | 6 | 8 | 10 | 12 | 12 | 14 | 14 | 16 | 18 | L | | |

| Win | Loss | No result |

- Note: The total points at the end of each group match are listed.
- Note: Click on the points (group matches) or W/L (playoffs) to see the match summary.

=== Fixtures ===
Match 1
28 March 2026
19:30 (N)
Scorecard

| Sunrisers Hyderabad; 201/9 (20 overs) | v | Royal Challengers Bengaluru (H); 203/4 (15.4 overs) |
| Ishan Kishan 80 (38); Jacob Duffy 3/22 (4 overs) | | Virat Kohli 69* (38); David Payne 2/35 (3 overs) |

Royal Challengers Bengaluru won by 6 wickets
M. Chinnaswamy Stadium, Bengaluru
Umpires: Ulhas Gandhe (Ind) and Jayaraman Madanagopal (Ind)
Player of the match: Jacob Duffy (Royal Challengers Bengaluru)

- Royal Challengers Bengaluru won the toss and elected to field.
- Abhinandan Singh (Royal Challengers Bengaluru) made his T20 debut.
- Jacob Duffy (Royal Challengers Bengaluru) and David Payne (Sunrisers Hyderabad) both made their IPL debuts.

Match 6
2 April 2026
19:30 (N)
Scorecard

| Sunrisers Hyderabad; 226/8 (20 overs) | v | Kolkata Knight Riders (H); 161 (16 overs) |
| Heinrich Klaasen 52 (35); Blessing Muzarabani 4/41 (4 overs) | | Angkrish Raghuvanshi 52 (29); Jaydev Unadkat 3/21 (3 overs) |

Sunrisers Hyderabad won by 65 runs
Eden Gardens, Kolkata
Umpires: Vinod Seshan (Ind) and Saidarshan Kumar (Ind)
Player of the match: Nitish Kumar Reddy (Sunrisers Hyderabad)

- Kolkata Knight Riders won the toss and elected to field.
- Abhishek Sharma became the first Indian player and overall second player to hit 100 sixes for Sunrisers Hyderabad.

Match 10
5 April 2026
15:30 (D/N)
Scorecard

| Sunrisers Hyderabad (H); 156/9 (20 overs) | v | Lucknow Super Giants; 160/5 (19.5 overs) |
| Heinrich Klaasen 62 (41); Mohammed Shami 2/9 (4 overs) | | Rishabh Pant 68* (50); Harsh Dubey 2/18 (4 overs) |

Lucknow Super Giants won by 5 wickets
Rajiv Gandhi Stadium, Hyderabad
Umpires: Saidarshan Kumar (Ind) and Anish Sahasrabudhe (Ind)
Player of the match: Mohammed Shami (Lucknow Super Giants)

- Lucknow Super Giants won the toss and elected to field.
- Heinrich Klaasen and Nitish Kumar Reddy scored the highest fifth-wicket partnership for Sunrisers Hyderabad (116).

Match 17
11 April 2026
15:30 (D/N)
Scorecard

| Sunrisers Hyderabad; 219/6 (20 overs) | v | Punjab Kings (H); 223/4 (18.5 overs) |
| Abhishek Sharma 74 (28); Shashank Singh 2/20 (3 overs) | | Shreyas Iyer 69* (33); Shivang Kumar 3/33 (4 overs) |

Punjab Kings won by 6 wickets
Maharaja Yadavindra Singh Stadium, Mullanpur
Umpires: Abhijeet Bengeri (Ind) and Rohan Pandit (Ind)
Player of the match: Shreyas Iyer (Punjab Kings)

- Punjab Kings won the toss and elected to field.

Match 21
13 April 2026
19:30 (N)
Scorecard

| Sunrisers Hyderabad (H); 216/6 (20 overs) | v | Rajasthan Royals; 159 (19 overs) |
| Ishan Kishan 91 (44); Jofra Archer 2/37 (4 overs) | | Donovan Ferreira 69 (44); Sakib Hussain 4/24 (4 overs) |

Sunrisers Hyderabad won by 57 runs
Rajiv Gandhi Stadium, Hyderabad
Umpires: Jayaraman Madanagopal (Ind) and Rohan Pandit (Ind)
Player of the match: Praful Hinge (Sunrisers Hyderabad)

- Rajasthan Royals won the toss and elected to field.
- Praful Hinge and Sakib Hussain (Sunrisers Hyderabad) both made their IPL debuts.
- Praful Hinge also became the first bowler to take 3 wickets in his debut over and to take 3 wickets in the opening over of an IPL innings.

Match 27
18 April 2026
19:30 (N)
Scorecard

| Sunrisers Hyderabad (H); 194/9 (20 overs) | v | Chennai Super Kings; 184/8 (20 overs) |
| Abhishek Sharma 59 (22); Anshul Kamboj 3/22 (3 overs) | | Matthew Short 34 (30); Eshan Malinga 3/29 (4 overs) |

Sunrisers Hyderabad won by 10 runs
Rajiv Gandhi Stadium, Hyderabad
Umpires: Anish Sahasrabudhe (Ind) and Vinod Seshan (Ind)
Player of the match: Eshan Malinga (Sunrisers Hyderabad)

- Chennai Super Kings won the toss and elected to field.

Match 31
21 April 2026
19:30 (N)
Scorecard

| Sunrisers Hyderabad (H); 242/2 (20 overs) | v | Delhi Capitals; 195/9 (20 overs) |
| Abhishek Sharma 135* (68); Axar Patel 1/23 (2 overs) | | Nitish Rana 57 (30); Eshan Malinga 4/32 (4 overs) |

Sunrisers Hyderabad won by 47 runs
Rajiv Gandhi Stadium, Hyderabad
Umpires: Anish Sahasrabudhe (Ind) and Vinod Seshan (Ind)
Player of the match: Abhishek Sharma (Sunrisers Hyderabad)

- Delhi Capitals won the toss and elected to field.
- Dilshan Madushanka (Sunrisers Hyderabad) made his IPL debut.

Match 36
25 April 2026
19:30 (N)
Scorecard

| Rajasthan Royals (H); 228/6 (20 overs) | v | Sunrisers Hyderabad; 229/5 (18.3 overs) |
| Vaibhav Sooryavanshi 103 (37); Eshan Malinga 2/38 (4 overs) | | Ishan Kishan 74 (31); Jofra Archer 2/34 (4 overs) |

Sunrisers Hyderabad won by 5 wickets
Sawai Mansingh Stadium, Jaipur
Umpires: Kaushik Gandhi (Ind) and Nitin Menon (Ind)
Player of the match: Ishan Kishan (Sunrisers Hyderabad)

- Sunrisers Hyderabad won the toss and elected to field.
- Vaibhav Sooryavanshi (Rajasthan Royals) became the fastest player to score 1,000 runs in T20s, in terms of deliveries faced (473).

Match 41
29 April 2026
19:30 (N)
Scorecard

| Mumbai Indians (H); 243/5 (20 overs) | v | Sunrisers Hyderabad; 249/4 (18.4 overs) |
| Ryan Rickelton 123* (55); Praful Hinge 2/54 (4 overs) | | Travis Head 76 (30); Allah Ghazanfar 2/51 (4 overs) |

Sunrisers Hyderabad won by 6 wickets
Wankhede Stadium, Mumbai
Umpires: Abhijeet Bengeri (Ind) and Jayaraman Madanagopal (Ind)
Player of the match: Heinrich Klaasen (Sunrisers Hyderabad)

- Mumbai Indians won the toss and elected to bat.
- Ryan Rickelton (Mumbai Indians) scored his maiden century in IPL.

Match 45
3 May 2026
15:30 (D/N)
Scorecard

| Sunrisers Hyderabad (H); 165 (19 overs) | v | Kolkata Knight Riders; 169/3 (18.2 overs) |
| Travis Head 61 (28); Varun Chakravarthy 3/36 (4 overs) | | Angkrish Raghuvanshi 59 (47); Sakib Hussain 1/17 (3 overs) |

Kolkata Knight Riders won by 7 wickets
Rajiv Gandhi Stadium, Hyderabad
Umpires: Abhijeet Bengeri (Ind) and Jayaraman Madanagopal (Ind)
Player of the match: Varun Chakravarthy (Kolkata Knight Riders)

- Sunrisers Hyderabad won the toss and elected to bat.
- Smaran Ravichandran (Sunrisers Hyderabad) made his IPL debut.
- Sunil Narine (Kolkata Knight Riders) became the first overseas player to take 200 wickets in IPL.

Match 49
6 May 2026
19:30 (N)
Scorecard

| Sunrisers Hyderabad (H); 235/4 (20 overs) | v | Punjab Kings; 202/7 (20 overs) |
| Heinrich Klaasen 69 (43); Yuzvendra Chahal 1/32 (4 overs) | | Cooper Connolly 107* (59); Pat Cummins 2/34 (4 overs) |

Sunrisers Hyderabad won by 33 runs
Rajiv Gandhi Stadium, Hyderabad
Umpires: Keyur Kelkar (Ind) and Jayaraman Madanagopal (Ind)
Player of the match: Pat Cummins (Sunrisers Hyderabad)

- Punjab Kings won the toss and elected to field.
- Cooper Connolly (Punjab Kings) scored his maiden century in IPL.

Match 56
12 May 2026
19:30 (N)
Scorecard

| Gujarat Titans (H); 168/5 (20 overs) | v | Sunrisers Hyderabad; 86 (14.5 overs) |
| Sai Sudharsan 61 (44); Praful Hinge 2/17 (4 overs) | | Pat Cummins 19 (9); Jason Holder 3/20 (4 overs) |

Gujarat Titans won by 82 runs
Narendra Modi Stadium, Ahmedabad
Umpires: Saiyed Khalid (Ind) and Virender Sharma (Ind)
Player of the match: Kagiso Rabada (Gujarat Titans)

- Sunrisers Hyderabad won the toss and elected to field.

Match 63
18 May 2026
19:30 (N)
Scorecard

| Chennai Super Kings (H); 180/7 (20 overs) | v | Sunrisers Hyderabad; 181/5 (19 overs) |
| Dewald Brevis 44 (27); Pat Cummins 3/28 (4 overs) | | Ishan Kishan 70 (47); Mukesh Choudhary 2/36 (4 overs) |

Sunrisers Hyderabad won by 5 wickets
M. A. Chidambaram Stadium, Chennai
Umpires: Nitin Menon (Ind) and Tanmay Srivastava (Ind)
Player of the match: Ishan Kishan (Sunrisers Hyderabad)

- Chennai Super Kings won the toss and elected to bat.
- Sunrisers Hyderabad and Gujarat Titans qualified for the playoffs as a result of this match.

Match 67
22 May 2026
19:30 (N)
Scorecard

| Sunrisers Hyderabad (H); 255/4 (20 overs) | v | Royal Challengers Bengaluru; 200/4 (20 overs) |
| Ishan Kishan 79 (46); Rasikh Salam 2/52 (4 overs) | | Rajat Patidar 56 (39); Eshan Malinga 2/33 (4 overs) |

Sunrisers Hyderabad won by 55 runs
Rajiv Gandhi Stadium, Hyderabad
Umpires: Jayaraman Madanagopal (Ind) and Amit Rana (Ind)
Player of the match: Ishan Kishan (Sunrisers Hyderabad)

- Sunrisers Hyderabad won the toss and elected to bat.
- Rajat Patidar (Royal Challengers Bengaluru) became the fastest Indian player to score 100 sixes in IPL.

== Playoffs ==
=== Bracket ===
Qualifier 1
26 May 2026 – Dharamshala
1 | Royal Challengers Bengaluru | 254/5 (20 overs)
2 | Gujarat Titans | 162 (19.3 overs)
Eliminator
27 May 2026 – Mullanpur
3 | Sunrisers Hyderabad | 196 (19.2 overs)
4 | Rajasthan Royals | 243/8 (20 overs)

Qualifier 2
29 May 2026 – Mullanpur
Q1L | Gujarat Titans | 219/3 (18.4 overs)
EW | Rajasthan Royals | 214/6 (20 overs)

Final
31 May 2026 – Ahmedabad
Q1W | Royal Challengers Bengaluru | 161/5 (18 overs)
Q2W | Gujarat Titans | 155/8 (20 overs)

- Sources: ESPNcricinfo

=== Eliminator ===
Eliminator
27 May 2026
19:30 (N)
Scorecard

| Rajasthan Royals; 243/8 (20 overs) | v | Sunrisers Hyderabad; 196 (19.2 overs) |
| Vaibhav Sooryavanshi 97 (29); Praful Hinge 3/54 (4 overs) | | Nitish Kumar Reddy 38 (20); Jofra Archer 3/58 (4 overs) |

Rajasthan Royals won by 47 runs
Maharaja Yadavindra Singh International Cricket Stadium, Mullanpur
Umpires: Ulhas Gandhe (Ind) and Adrian Holdstock (SA)
Player of the match: Vaibhav Sooryavanshi (Rajasthan Royals)

- Sunrisers Hyderabad won the toss and elected to field.
- Vaibhav Sooryavanshi (Rajasthan Royals) broke Chris Gayle's record (59) for most sixes in a single IPL season.

== Statistics ==
Most runs
| Runs | Player |
|---|---|
| 624 | Heinrich Klaasen |
| 602 | Ishan Kishan |
| 563 | Abhishek Sharma |
| 410 | Travis Head |
| 302 | Nitish Kumar Reddy |

Most wickets
| Wickets | Player |
|---|---|
| 20 | Eshan Malinga |
| 15 | Sakib Hussain |
| 14 | Praful Hinge |
| 9 | Shivang Kumar |
| 8 | 3 players |
