= Sunrisers Hyderabad =

- Nicknames: Orange Army; Eagles
- League: Indian Premier League

Personnel
- Captain: Pat Cummins
- Coach: Daniel Vettori
- Bowling coach: Varun Aaron; Muttiah Muralitharan
- Owner: Sun Group
- Chief executive: Kaviya Maran
- Manager: Srinath Bhashyam

Team information
- City: Hyderabad, Telangana, India
- Colours: Orange and black
- Founded: 2013; 13 years ago (Replacing Deccan Chargers)
- Home ground: Rajiv Gandhi International Cricket Stadium, Hyderabad
- Capacity: 39,200

History
- Indian Premier League wins: 1 (2016 IPL)
- Official website: sunrisershyderabad.in
T20I kit

The Sunrisers Hyderabad are a professional Twenty20 cricket team based in Hyderabad, Telangana, that competes in the Indian Premier League (IPL). The franchise is owned by Kalanithi Maran of Sun Group and was founded in 2013 after the Hyderabad-based Deccan Chargers in erstwhile United Andhra Pradesh were terminated by the IPL. The team is coached by Daniel Vettori and captained by Pat Cummins. The home ground of the team is Rajiv Gandhi International Cricket Stadium.

The team made their first IPL appearance in 2013, where they reached the playoffs, eventually finishing in fourth place. The Sunrisers won their first IPL title in the 2016 season, defeating Royal Challengers Bangalore by 8 runs in the final. The team has qualified for the play-off stage of the tournament for five consecutive seasons between 2016 and 2020. In 2018, the team reached the finals of the Indian Premier League, but lost to the Chennai Super Kings. In 2024, the team reached the finals of the Indian Premier League, but lost to the Kolkata Knight Riders. The team was considered one of the best bowling teams, often admired for its ability to defend low totals, but now has shifted to a remarkable batting team, according to many cricket pundits. The team also holds the record for the highest-ever IPL total with 287 runs and holds many IPL batting records. David Warner is the leading run scorer for the team, having won the Orange Cap three times, in 2015, 2017, and 2019. Bhuvneshwar Kumar is the leading wicket-taker having won the Purple Cap twice, in 2016 and 2017. The COVID-19 pandemic impacted the brand value of the Sunrisers Hyderabad which saw a decline of 4% to US$57.4 million in 2020 as the overall brand value of the IPL decreased to US$4.4 billion, according to Brand Finance.

== History ==
=== Foundation ===
Sunrisers Hyderabad replaced the Deccan Chargers in 2012 and debuted in the 2013 season. The franchise was awarded to the Sun TV Network after the termination of the Deccan Chargers, whose owners, Deccan Chronicle Holdings Ltd, were expelled from the league by the BCCI following prolonged financial and operational issues. The new ownership group, led by media baron Kalanithi Maran of the Sun Group, secured the Hyderabad-based franchise rights with a successful bid of ₹85.05 crore (US$9.1 million) per year for a five‑year period, making it one of the more lucrative team deals in the league at the time. The formal announcement of the squad took place in Chennai on 18 December 2012, marking the official transition from the Deccan Chargers era to the Sunrisers Hyderabad brand.

The team jersey was unveiled on 8 March 2013, featuring a predominantly orange and black colour scheme intended to symbolise energy, aggression and the rising sun motif that would come to define the franchise's visual identity. The team anthem, composed by G. V. Prakash Kumar, was released on 12 March 2013 and was used extensively in promotional campaigns and stadium presentations during the inaugural season. The team logo was previously unveiled on 20 December 2012, depicting a stylised eagle with outstretched wings rising against the sun, a design meant to represent resilience, renewal and the continuation of Hyderabad's IPL legacy after the exit of the Deccan Chargers.

=== 2013–2015: Initial years ===
Sunrisers Hyderabad made their IPL debut in the 2013 season. They retained 20 players from the Chargers, which left slots open for 13 players (eight Indian, five overseas). They filled six of these with Thisara Perera, Darren Sammy, Sudeep Tyagi, Nathan McCullum, Quinton de Kock and Clint McKay. Kumar Sangakkara captained SRH for nine matches and Cameron White was captain for the remaining seven, as well as the eliminator match in the playoffs. In their inaugural season, the team reached the playoffs but were eliminated after losing against Rajasthan Royals by 4 wickets at Feroz Shah Kotla in Delhi on 22 May 2013. The team played all of their home games in Hyderabad.

For the 2014 season, Pune Warriors India was defunct and not replaced, leaving only eight teams in the league. The team retained two players, Dale Steyn and Shikhar Dhawan. As a result of this retention, the team had an auction purse of ₹380 million (US$4.1 million) and two right-to-match cards. Shikhar Dhawan and Darren Sammy were named as captain and vice captain respectively. Due to the 2014 Lok Sabha Elections, the season was partially held outside India with the opening 20 matches hosted in the United Arab Emirates and the remaining matches played in India from 2 May onwards. The team finished in 6th place with six wins and eight losses, failing to secure a place in the playoffs. Dhawan led the team for the first ten matches while Sammy led the team for remaining four.

For the 2015 season, SRH retained 13 players and released 11. David Warner was appointed as the captain for this season and led the team in all matches played. Muttiah Muralitharan was appointed the team's bowling coach as well as mentor. Sunrisers Hyderabad played their first three home games at Visakhapatnam and the remaining four home games at Hyderabad. The team again finished 6th with seven wins and seven losses, failing to reach the playoffs. Warner won the first Orange Cap for SRH.

=== 2016–2020: Maiden title and consecutive playoff appearances ===
For the 2016 season, SRH retained 15 players and released nine. After the auction, SRH traded two players. Sunrisers Hyderabad were crowned champions under David Warner's magnificent captaincy after defeating Royal Challengers Bangalore in the final and ending the season with 11 wins and six losses. They are the only team to win the IPL playing in the Eliminator- the match between third and fourth-placed teams. This was their maiden, and to date only, title. Bhuvneshwar Kumar became the first Sunrisers Hyderabad player to win the Purple Cap.

For the 2017 season, SRH retained 17 players and released six from the title-winning squad. The team then spent ₹45.1 crore (US$4.8 million) at the auction, leaving ₹20.9 crore (US$2.2 million) remaining. As the defending champions, as per IPL norms, SRH hosted both the opening and closing ceremonies of the season. The team finished 3rd on points in the table. They lost against the Kolkata Knight Riders in the eliminator match at the M. Chinnaswamy Stadium in Bangalore. The team made a below-par total of 128–7 in 20 overs, but the Kolkata Knight Riders' innings was reduced to just six overs due to rain. The revised total was 48, which the Knight Riders met with seven wickets and four balls remaining. Bhuvneshwar Kumar was able to retain the Purple Cap while David Warner won the Orange Cap.

For the 2018 season, the Chennai Super Kings and Rajasthan Royals were reinstated in the league after serving a two-year suspension from the competition due to the involvement of their players in the 2013 IPL betting scandal. The IPL governing council decided that a maximum of five players can be retained by each IPL team. SRH retained only two players and released all remaining players from the squad. The retention of two players meant SRH went in to the 2018 IPL auction with ₹59 crore in their auction purse and three right-to-match (RTM) cards. The salary deduction for every retained player from the franchise's salary purse was stipulated to be ₹15 crore, ₹11 crore and ₹7 crore if three players were retained; ₹12.5 crore and ₹8.5 crore if two players were retained; and ₹12.5 crore if only one player was retained. For retaining an uncapped player, salary deduction was set at ₹3 crore. David Warner had stepped down from captaincy on 28 March 2018 and the BCCI announced that he will not be allowed to play in IPL 2018 following the Australian ball-tampering controversy. On 29 March, New Zealand captain Kane Williamson was chosen to lead SRH for the 2018 season. On 31 March, England batsman Alex Hales was announced as replacement for the banned Warner. SRH finished the 2018 season as runners-up of the competition after losing to Chennai Super Kings in the final with 10 wins and seven losses. Williamson won the Orange Cap with 735 runs.

Ahead of the auction, SRH traded Shikhar Dhawan to Delhi Capitals in favour of Shahbaz Nadeem, Vijay Shankar and Abhishek Sharma. SRH retained 17 players and released nine players. On auction day (18 December 2018), SRH bought three new players; Jonny Bairstow, Martin Guptill and Wriddhiman Saha, the latter of which was bought back in the auction after initially being released. David Warner made a comeback to IPL on 24 March 2019 after he was banned by BCCI to participate in 2018 season due to Australian ball-tampering controversy. SRH decided to stay with Kane Williamson as captain and Bhuvneshwar Kumar as vice-captain. Before start of the season, Williamson was nursing an injury and Kumar led the team in the first game against Kolkata Knight Riders and from the third game till the sixth game. SRH ended the 2019 season with 6 wins and 9 losses. They lost against Delhi Capitals in the Eliminator at Dr. Y. S. Rajasekhara Reddy ACA-VDCA Cricket Stadium in Visakhapatnam. Warner won the orange cap in this season.

Ahead of the auction, SRH retained 18 players and released 5 players. On auction day (19 December 2019), SRH bought 7 new players including the likes of Mitchell Marsh and Priyam Garg among others. SRH parted ways with Tom Moody and Simon Helmot and named Trevor Bayliss and Brad Haddin as Head coach and Assistant Coach respectively. On 27 February 2020, Warner was reinstated as captain of SRH replacing Kane Williamson. SRH ended their 2020 campaign with 8 wins and 8 losses. In the playoffs, they beat the Royal Challengers Bangalore before losing to the Delhi Capitals in the Qualifier 2 at Sheikh Zayed Cricket Stadium in Abu Dhabi with Warner as their highest run-scorer for the season.

=== 2021–2023: Struggles ===
Ahead of the 2021 auction, SRH retained 22 players and released 5 players. On auction day (18 February 2021), SRH bought 3 players – J Suchith, Mujeeb Ur Rahman, and Kedar Jadhav. In addition, SRH added Tom Moody back to the staff team as the Director of Cricket. Following the team's poor start to the season with 1 win from 7 games, SRH announced Kane Williamson as their captain for the remainder of the season replacing David Warner.

Tom Moody and Simon Helmot became the head coach and assistant-coach respectively for their second stint following the departure of Trevor Bayliss and Brad Haddin as Head coach and assistant coach respectively. Dale Steyn has been appointed as the Fast bowling coach for SRH while Muttiah Muralitharan remained as the spin bowling coach. Ahead of the Mega auction, SRH retained Kane Williamson, Abdul Samad, and Umran Malik and has released other players including Jonny Bairstow, Warner, Rashid Khan, Manish Pandey, Sandeep Sharma and Siddarth Kaul for the 2022 Mega auction. SRH has bought Bhuvneshwar Kumar, T. Natarajan, Marco Jansen, Aiden Markram, Rahul Tripathi, Abhishek Sharma, Romario Shepherd, Washington Sundar, Nicholas Pooran and Glenn Phillips during the IPL 2022 Mega auction. Kane Williamson led the team in the 2022 season. They finished in 8th place on the points table. After initial success, the team lost five back-to-back matches and didn't qualify for the playoffs.

SRH appointed Brian Lara as the head coach ahead of the 2023 season replacing Tom Moody. SRH have announced Aiden Markram as the new captain for 2023 season replacing former captain Kane Williamson following a poor 2022 season. Ahead of the auction, SRH retained 12 players while the franchise released their captain Kane Williamson and other players including Nicholas Pooran, Jagadeesha Suchith, and Romario Shepherd. On the auction day, their significant buys were Harry Brook, Mayank Agarwal, Heinrich Klaasen and Adil Rashid. The team disappointed, managing only 4 wins over the season (including a solitary win at the home ground) while many players had difficult campaigns, including Brook, Agarwal and Malik with the performances of Heinrich Klaasen, Bhuvneshwar Kumar and Mayank Markande being the positives.

=== 2024: Turnaround after struggles ===
Following the 2023 season debacle, SRH announced Daniel Vettori as the head coach replacing Brian Lara and released the likes of Harry Brook, Adil Rashid, and Kartik Tyagi ahead of the IPL 2024 auction. SRH traded Mayank Dagar to Royal Challengers Bengaluru and got Shahbaz Ahmed in return ahead of the players retention/release deadline. On the auction day, SRH purchased the likes of Pat Cummins, Travis Head, Wanindu Hasaranga, Jaydev Unadkat. SRH announced Pat Cummins as the new captain for the 2024 season replacing former captain Aiden Markram following a poor 2023 season.

The team started off their campaign with a narrow defeat against Kolkata Knight Riders. On 27 March 2024, Sunrisers Hyderabad surpassed Royal Challengers Bengaluru's 11-year-old record of the highest-ever IPL total of 263 runs by scoring 277 against Mumbai Indians, & securing a 31-run victory at the in Hyderabad. Following this, the team endured another narrow defeat to Gujarat Titans. The team then went with a 4 match winning streak against Chennai Super Kings, Punjab Kings, Royal Challengers Bangalore and Delhi Capitals with the last 3 being at their respective home grounds.

On 15 April 2024, Sunrisers Hyderabad broke their own record for the highest IPL total with a sensational 287 for three against Royal Challengers Bengaluru in Bengaluru. SRH's total is also the second-highest T20 cricket, only behind Nepal's 314/3 against Mongolia in 2023. In reply, RCB racked up 262 for seven in a 25-run defeat, the highest T20 score ever to end up on the losing team.

Following the 4 match winning streak, the team had recorded its solitary home defeat against Royal Challengers Bangalore followed by a defeat against CSK in Chennai. SRH pulled off a 1 run win against Rajasthan Royals at home with Bhuvneshwar Kumar defending 12 runs (needed for Rajasthan to clinch the win) and dismissing Rovman Powell on the final delivery off the match. The team then lost to Mumbai Indians in Mumbai. The team has returned to Hyderabad for their final 3 league games, the team has chased down Lucknow Super Giants total of 165 in 9.4 overs without losing a single wicket, followed by a washout against Gujarat Titans and have finished off the league stage with a win against Punjab Kings at home and ended at number 2 position in the table marking a return to playoffs after 4 years.

The team played against Kolkata Knight Riders at Ahmedabad in Qualifier 1, which they lost by 8 wickets and played the qualifier 2 against Rajasthan Royals in Chennai, won the match by 36 runs and advanced to finals to play Kolkata Knight Riders in Chennai. The team ended the season as runners up with Kolkata Knight Riders winning by 8 wickets, the team has finished with 9 wins, 7 losses and 1 No result.

=== 2025: A season of ups and downs ===
Ahead of the season, SRH retained just five players of Captain Pat Cummins, Travis Head, Heinrich Klaasen, Abhishek Sharma and Nitish Kumar Reddy while remainder of the squad including Bhuvneshwar Kumar, T Natarajan, Rahul Tripathi, Aiden Markram, Marco Jansen were released. During the Mega Auction 2025, SRH purchased the players of Ishan Kishan, Mohammed Shami, Harshal Patel, Aniket Verma, Eshan Malinga, Rahul Chahar, Adam Zampa, Kamindu Mendis, Jaydev Unadkat, Abhinav Manohar and Brydon Carse. During the season, Wiaan Mulder, Smaran Ravichandran and Harsh Dubey were drafted in as injury replacements of Brydon Carse, Adam Zampa and Smaran Ravichandran respectively. Hemang Badani left the squad from a batting coach role while James Franklin replaced Dale Steyn as the Fast Bowling coach

While SRH started off 2025 with a resounding victory over Rajasthan Royals in their opening match at Hyderabad, they couldn't retain the momentum and lost a few back-to-back games, which made them reeling at the 9th place for majority of the season.

The team then bounced back by recording their highest successful run chase of 246 against Punjab Kings at home. The team ended their season on a high by winning 4 out of their last 6 matches including beating the Chennai Super Kings at Chennai for the first time and also a seemingly winning match against Delhi Capitals at Hyderabad was washed out due to heavy rain and wet outfield. Ultimately the team finished in the 6th place with 6 Wins, 7 Losses and 1 No Result.

=== 2026: Present ===
Following the ups and downs season, SRH replaced James Franklin with Varun Aaron as Fast Bowling coach, with Franklin being promoted to assistant coach. SRH released 7 players including the likes of Rahul Chahar, Wiaan Mulder, Adam Zampa, Simarjeet Singh and retained the remainder of the squad. Mohammed Shami was traded to Lucknow Super Giants for an all-cash deal prior to players release/retention deadline. During the IPL 2026 auction, SRH purchased 10 players including the likes of Liam Livingstone, Jack Edwards, Shivam Mavi, Salil Arora.

Ishan Kishan stood in as captain during the first half of the season leading the team to 4 wins, 3 losses from 7 games with regular captain Pat Cummins rehabilitating from a back injury. Upon Cummins return, the team had qualified into playoffs after missing out in the previous season.

SRH started with a loss against RCB in the season opener and were reeling with 3 losses and 1 win from their first 4 games but then followed a 5 match winning streak including hat trick of wins at home, recording their highest successful chase of 243 against Mumbai Indians at Mumbai before losing home game against KKR, SRH then ended the league stage with 9 wins and 5 losses, ended up at 3 in points table after missing out on top spot with RCB & GT on Net run rate basis. SRH took on Rajasthan Royals in the eliminator but lost by 47 runs thus ending their 2026 campaign.

=== Captains ===
Last updated: 21 May 2026

Note: The Captains list and results include the participation of CLT20 2013 and from IPL 2013 to latest season.

Player	Nationality (Note: The information in the nationality column is according to ESPNcricinfo. This information may not necessarily reflect the player's birthplace or citizenship.)	From	To	Matches	Won	Lost	Tied	NR	Win%	Best Result	Notes
Kumar Sangakkara	Sri Lanka	2013	2013	9	4	4	1	0	50.00	Playoffs (2013)	
Cameron White	Australia	2013	2013	8	5	3	0	0	62.50	Playoffs (2013)	
Shikhar Dhawan	India	2013	2014	17	7	9	0	1	41.19	6/8 (2014)	Started captaining since CLT20 2013 and for most of IPL 2014 season
Daren Sammy	West Indies	2014	2014	4	2	2	0	0	50.00	Stand-In	Replaced Shikhar Dhawan following poor results in most of the IPL 2014 season
David Warner	Australia	2015	2021	68	35	30	2	1	51.48	Winner (2016)	
Kane Williamson	New Zealand	2018	2022	46	22	23	1	0	47.83	Runner-up (2018)	
Bhuvneshwar Kumar	India	2018	2023	8	2	6	0	0	25.00	Stand-In	
Manish Pandey	India	2021	2021	1	0	1	0	0	0	Stand-In	
Aiden Markram	South Africa	2023	2023	13	4	9	0	0	30.77	10/10 (2023)	
Pat Cummins	Australia	2024	Present	38	21	15	0	2	55.27	Runner-up (2024)	
Ishan Kishan	India	2026	Present	7	4	3	0	0	57.14	Stand-In	

== Home ground ==
Home record of the Sunrisers (at Hyderabad)
	Matches	Wins	Losses	NR	Success Rate
In IPL	71	43	26	2	60.57%
(As of 22 May 2026)

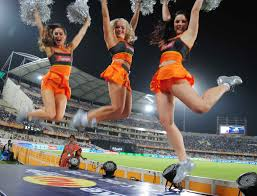
The Sunrisers Hyderabad cheerleaders.

The Rajiv Gandhi International Cricket Stadium is the principal cricket stadium in Hyderabad and is the home ground of the SRH. It is owned by the Hyderabad Cricket Association (HCA). It is located in the eastern suburb of Uppal.

In 2015, the 30,000-capacity Dr. Y. S. Rajasekhara Reddy ACA–VDCA Cricket Stadium, which is located in Visakhapatnam, Andhra Pradesh, was selected as the secondary home ground for Sunrisers Hyderabad and the team played their first three home games there during that season.

During the 2017 season, as the Sunrisers Hyderabad were defending IPL champions, they hosted the season opener and final. SRH selected their primary home ground to host their home games.

During the 2019 season, Rajiv Gandhi International Cricket Stadium was selected to host the IPL final after the BCCI decided to shift the match from M. A. Chidambaram Stadium in Chennai after TNCA failed to secure permission to open three locked stands for the match. Hyderabad Cricket Association won the award for best ground and pitch during the IPL 2019 and IPL 2024 seasons.

During the 2025 season, the Sunrisers Hyderabad reportedly threatened to pull out of Hyderabad and host their home matches at another venue after news reports indicated the dispute with the owners and the then Hyderabad Cricket Association president regarding complimentary ticket distribution and IPL ticket scam before the matter got sorted and SRH continued to play their home matches as scheduled.

== Current squad ==
- Players with international caps are listed in **bold**.
- * denotes a player who is currently unavailable for selection.
- * denotes a player who is unavailable for rest of the season.

No.	Name	Nat	Birth date	Batting style	Bowling style	Year signed	Salary	Notes
Batters
108	Aniket Verma	(India)	5 February 2002 (age 24)	Right-handed	Right arm medium-fast	2025	₹30 lakh (US$32,000)	
10	Smaran Ravichandran	(India)	5 February 2002 (age 24)	Left-handed	Right arm off-break	2025	₹30 lakh (US$32,000)	
Wicket-keepers
45	**Heinrich Klaasen**	(South Africa)	30 July 1991 (age 35)	Right-handed	Right-arm off spin	2023	₹23 crore (US$2.5 million)	Overseas
23	**Ishan Kishan**	(India)	18 July 1998 (age 28)	Left-handed	Right-arm leg break	2025	₹11.25 crore (US$1.2 million)	Vice-Captain
12	Salil Arora	(India)	7 November 2002 (age 24)	Right-handed		2026	₹1.50 crore (US$160,000)	
All-rounders
4	**Abhishek Sharma**	(India)	4 September 2000 (age 26)	Left-handed	Left-arm orthodox	2019	₹14 crore (US$1.5 million)	
88	**Nitish Kumar Reddy**	(India)	26 May 2003 (age 23)	Right-handed	Right-arm medium-fast	2023	₹6 crore (US$640,000)	
05	Shivang Kumar	(India)	26 May 2002 (age 24)	Right-handed	Left-arm unorthodox	2026	₹30 lakh (US$32,000)	
7	**Harsh Dubey**	(India)	23 July 2002 (age 24)	Left-handed	Left-arm orthodox	2025	₹30 lakh (US$32,000)	
92	**Brydon Carse**	(England)	31 July 1995 (age 31)	Right-handed	Right-arm fast	2025	₹1 crore (US$110,000)	Overseas
Pace bowlers
71	**Khaleel Ahmed**	(India)	5 December 1997 (age 28)	Right-handed	Left-arm fast-medium	2027	₹4.8 crore (US$510,000)	
12	**Nathan Ellis**	(Australia)	22 September 1994 (age 32)	Right-handed	Right-arm fast-medium	2027	₹2 crore (US$210,000)	Overseas;
30	**Pat Cummins**	(Australia)	8 May 1993 (age 33)	Right-handed	Right arm fast	2024	₹18 crore (US$1.9 million)	Overseas Captain
97	**Eshan Malinga**	(Sri Lanka)	4 February 2001 (age 25)	Right-handed	Right-arm fast-medium	2025	₹1.2 crore (US$130,000)	Overseas
9	Praful Hinge	(India)	18 January 2002 (age 24)	Right-handed	Right arm medium-fast	2026	₹30 lakh (US$32,000)	
18	Sakib Hussain	(India)	14 December 2004 (age 21)	Right-handed	Right arm fast-medium	2026	₹30 lakh (US$32,000)	
35	T. Natarajan	(India)	8 April 1991 (age 35)	Right-handed	Left-arm medium	2025	₹5 crore (US$530,000)	
Spin bowlers
53	Krains Fuletra	(India)	19 June 2004 (age 22)	Right-handed	Right-arm unorthodox	2026	₹30 lakh (US$32,000)	
Source:SRH Squad

== Administration and support staff ==
Position	Name
CEO	(India) K. Shanmugam
General manager	(India) Srinath Bhashyam
Team manager	(India) Vijay Kumar
Head coach	(New Zealand) Daniel Vettori
Assistant coach	(New Zealand) James Franklin
Assistant and fielding coach	(Australia) Simon Helmot
Batting coach	(India) Hariesh Jaikumar
Spin-bowling and strategic coach	(Sri Lanka) Muttiah Muralitharan
Pace bowling coach	(India) Varun Aaron
Physio	(India) Shyam Sundar Jayapalan
Physical trainer	(Sri Lanka) Mario Villavarayan

== Seasons ==
=== Summaries ===
Season	W–L	Pos.	Finals	Coach	Captain	Most Runs	Most Wickets	Refs
2013	10–7	4th	Q	Tom Moody	Kumar Sangakkara / Cameron White	Shikhar Dhawan (311)	Amit Mishra (21)	
2014	6–8	6th	—	Tom Moody	Shikhar Dhawan / Darren Sammy	David Warner (528)	Bhuvneshwar Kumar (20)	
2015	7–7	6th	—	Tom Moody	David Warner	David Warner (562)	Bhuvneshwar Kumar (18)	
2016	11–6	3rd	C	Tom Moody	David Warner	David Warner (848)	Bhuvneshwar Kumar (23)	
2017	8–6 (1 NR)	3rd	Q	Tom Moody	David Warner	David Warner (641)	Bhuvneshwar Kumar (26)	
2018	10–7	1st	R	Tom Moody	Kane Williamson	Kane Williamson (735)	Siddarth Kaul (21)	
2019	6–8 (1 T)	4th	Q	Tom Moody	Kane Williamson / Bhuvneshwar Kumar	David Warner (692)	Khaleel Ahmed (19)	
2020	8–7 (1 NR)	3rd	Q	Trevor Bayliss	David Warner	David Warner (548)	Rashid Khan (20)	
2021	3–11	8th	—	Trevor Bayliss	David Warner / Kane Williamson	Manish Pandey (292)	Rashid Khan (18)	
2022	6–8	8th	—	Tom Moody	Kane Williamson	Abhishek Sharma (426)	Umran Malik (22)	
2023	4–10	10th	—	Brian Lara	Aiden Markram	Heinrich Klaasen (448)	Bhuvneshwar Kumar (16)	
2024	9–7 (1 NR)	2nd	R	Daniel Vettori	Pat Cummins	Travis Head (567)	T. Natarajan (19)	
2025	6–7 (1 NR)	6th	—	Daniel Vettori	Pat Cummins	Heinrich Klaasen (487)	Pat Cummins / Harshal Patel (16)	
2026	9–6	3rd	Q	Daniel Vettori	Pat Cummins / Ishan Kishan	Heinrich Klaasen (624)	Eshan Malinga (20)	
2027

=== Tournament finishes ===
Year	League standing	Final standing
2013	4th out of 9	Playoffs
2014	6th out of 8	League stage
2015	6th out of 8	League stage
2016	3rd out of 8	Champions
2017	3rd out of 8	Playoffs
2018	2nd out of 8	Runners-up
2019	4th out of 8	Playoffs
2020	3rd out of 8	Playoffs
2021	8th out of 8	League stage
2022	8th out of 10	League stage
2023	10th out of 10	League stage
2024	2nd out of 10	Runners-up
2025	6th out of 10	League stage
2026	3rd out of 10	Playoffs

=== Season Statistics ===
Year	Played	Wins	Losses	Tied/NR
2013	17	10	7	0
2014	14	6	8	0
2015	14	7	7	0
2016	17	11	6	0
2017	15	8	6	1
2018	17	10	7	0
2019	15	6	9	0
2020	16	8	8	0
2021	14	3	11	0
2022	14	6	8	0
2023	14	4	10	0
2024	17	9	7	1
2025	14	6	7	1
2026	15	9	6	0
2027
Source: Cricinfo

Note:

- NR indicates No Result.
- Tied indicates a tied match, including Super Over results.
- Abandoned matches are indicated as no result.

== Records and statistics ==
=== By season ===
Year	Round	Points Table Standing	Matches Played	Matches Won	Matches Lost	Matches No result	Success Rate [%]
2013	Playoffs	4th out of 9	17	10	7	0	58.82
2014	League stage	6th out of 8	14	6	8	0	42.86
2015	League stage	6th out of 8	14	7	7	0	50.00
2016	Champions	3rd out of 8	17	11	6	0	64.70
2017	Playoffs	3rd out of 8	15	8	6	1	53.33
2018	Runners-up	1st out of 8	17	10	7	0	58.82
2019	Playoffs	4th out of 8	15	6	9	0	40.00
2020	Playoffs	3rd out of 8	16	8	8	0	50.00
2021	League stage	8th out of 8	14	3	11	0	21.42
2022	League stage	8th out of 10	14	6	8	0	42.86
2023	League stage	10th out of 10	14	4	10	0	28.57
2024	Runners-up	2nd out of 10	17	9	7	1	52.94
2025	League Stage	6th out of 10	14	6	7	1	42.86
2026	Playoffs	3rd out of 10	15	9	6	0	60.00
Total	1 Title, 3 Finals, 8 Playoffs in 14 Seasons		213	103	107	3	48.59
Last updated: 27 May 2026

=== By opposition ===
Opposition	Seasons	Games played	Won	Lost	Tied	No result	Win %
Chennai Super Kings	2013–present	24	9	15	0	0	35.50
Delhi Capitals	2013–present	27	14	12	0	1	51.85
Gujarat Titans	2022–present	8	1	6	0	1	12.50
Kolkata Knight Riders	2013–present	32	11	21	0	0	34.38
Lucknow Super Giants	2022–present	7	2	5	0	0	28.57
Mumbai Indians	2013–present	26	11	15	0	0	42.31
Punjab Kings	2013–present	26	18	8	0	0	69.23
Rajasthan Royals	2013–present	24	14	10	0	0	58.33
Royal Challengers Bengaluru	2013–present	28	15	12	0	1	53.57
Rising Pune Supergiant	2016–2017	4	1	3	0	0	25.00
Gujarat Lions	2016–2017	5	5	0	0	0	100.00
Pune Warriors India	2013	2	2	0	0	0	100.00
Total	2013–present	213	103	107	0	3	48.38
Last updated: 27 May 2026

Team now defunct

=== Champions League T20 ===
Year	Round	Position	Games played	Won	Lost	Tied	No result	Win %
2013	Group stage	7th	7	3	3	0	1	42.85

=== Home record ===
This section include records against other teams at the Rajiv Gandhi International Cricket Stadium in IPL.

Source: Howstat
Opposition	Mat	Won	Lost	N/R	Success Rate	Last Played
Chennai Super Kings	6	4	2	0	66.67%	18 Apr 2026
Delhi Capitals	8	4	3	1	50.00%	21 Apr 2026
Kolkata Knight Riders	8	3	5	0	37.50%	3 May 2026
Mumbai Indians	10	5	5	0	50.00%	23 Apr 2025
Punjab Kings	11	10	1	0	90.91%	6 May 2026
Rajasthan Royals	7	6	1	0	85.71%	13 April 2026
Royal Challengers Bengaluru	10	7	3	0	70.00%	22 May 2026
Lucknow Super Giants	4	1	3	0	25.00%	06 Apr 2026
Gujarat Titans	2	0	1	1	00.00%	06 Apr 2025
Pune Warriors India	1	1	0	0	100%	3 Apr 2013
Gujarat Lions	2	2	0	0	100%	07 Apr 2017
Rising Pune Supergiant	2	0	2	0	0	6 May 2017
Total	71	43	26	2	60.57%	(As of 22 May 2026)

Team now defunct

== Rivalries ==
=== Rivalry with Royal Challengers Bengaluru ===
There is a notable rivalry between Royal Challengers Bengaluru and the Hyderabad franchises, first with Deccan Chargers and now with Sunrisers Hyderabad. The clashes between Bengaluru and Hyderabad have been intense with the latter ultimately dominating the former. Deccan Chargers had won 6 out of the 11 clashes during the 2008-2012 period. After SRH replaced Deccan Chargers (due to their termination by BCCI) ahead of 2013 season. Sunrisers currently lead with 14 wins and 11 losses against RCB as of the latest edition.

Sunrisers and RCB have met for the first time in 2013 season at Hyderabad, the first encounter ended up as a tie, SRH won via the super over against Bangalore with the latter falling short by 5 runs in the Super Over. As of now, SRH still hold the record of highest total in a super over in IPL history with 20/0 courtesy Cameron White and Thisara Perera. During the same season, SRH won their last league stage match against KKR at home, resulting in SRH edging out RCB and qualified to playoffs in their maiden season and RCB ended up at 5 in the points table

There is also a notable trend where the Hyderabad franchise has jeopardised RCB's campaigns in some way or the other. The 2009 Indian Premier League final was won by Deccan Chargers and the 2016 Indian Premier League final was won by Sunrisers Hyderabad, both times RCB ended up as runners up. Their 2020 clash was also at a high-stake eliminator, where a fifty by Kane Williamson trumped RCB to knock them out of IPL 2020. Even with their abysmal 2021 season, SRH were able to beat a rising RCB. RCB had the opportunity to reach the top 2 but ended up in 3rd place, forcing them to play the eliminator, where they eventually lost to KKR, knocking them out of IPL 2021.

RCB's 2022 IPL campaign was also affected by SRH, whom they lost to by 9 wickets after scoring 68 in their first encounter, putting them under pressure because of their negative run rate throughout their otherwise strong campaign.

In IPL 2024, like the Kolkata Knight Riders, Sunrisers Hyderabad were the first to break the 263-run record set by RCB, which seemed insurmountable at the time as a result of Chris Gayle's 175 *. SRH again broke RCB's record against RCB themselves on at the M Chinnaswamy Stadium, scoring 287 runs, thanks to a 39-ball century by Travis Head and a 30-ball 67 by Heinrich Klassen. Although there was a valiant effort by RCB, spearheaded by Dinesh Karthik's 83 off 35 and captain Faf du Plessis's 62 off 28, RCB still lost by 25 runs. The loss also worsened RCB's already unfavourable odds in their IPL 2024 to qualify for the playoffs. SRH would break RCB's 263 record for the third time and score 266 against the Delhi Capitals after setting an all-time T20 record by scoring 125 runs inside the power-play.

In IPL 2025, the 2 teams again met during their sole league stage game at the Ekana Stadium in Lucknow. SRH scored 231/6 courtesy Ishan Kishan's 94* (48), Abhishek Sharma 34 (17), RCB got off to a flier with Phil Salt and Virat Kohli opening Partnership of 80 off 6.5 overs. After SRH got the breakthroughs of Kohli, Mayank Agarwal, Phil Salt, RCB collapsed to 189/10 courtesy Captain Cummins picking up 3 wickets and Eshan Malinga picking up 2 wickets.

=== Rivalry with Kolkata Knight Riders ===
The rivalry Kolkata Knight Riders intensified during the 2024 season, as the two teams met three times, including in the final. Kolkata has historically held the upper hand in this matchup, winning 21 of their 32 total encounters as of the 2026 season.[59]

2024: Dominance to Runner up

In 2024, SRH was dominating the tournament by their explosive batting while Kolkata dominated Hyderabad by winning all three of their meetings. After a narrow 4-run victory in the league stage at Eden Gardens (in Kolkata), the two teams met in Qualifier 1, where KKR chased down 160 in just 13.4 overs at Ahmedabad to reach the finals.

On 26 May 2024, the teams faced off in the IPL Final at M. A. Chidambaram Stadium in Chennai. KKR's bowling attack, led by Mitchell Starc and Andre Russell, dismantled the Hyderabad batting lineup by bowling them out for 113, the lowest total in an IPL final history. Kolkata chased the target in just 10.3 overs with 8 wickets to spare, securing their third championship title and SRH ending up as runners up for that season and second time in IPL history (after 2018)

2025 : A lose and a win

The 2025 season saw both teams exchange dominant victories. In their first meeting at Eden Gardens, KKR recorded an 80-run win after posting 200/6, with Venkatesh Iyer scoring 60 (29) and Vaibhav Arora and Varun Chakaravarthy taking three wickets each.

However, in the return fixture on 25 May 2025 at the Arun Jaitley Stadium in Delhi (after IPL 2025 resumed following a week suspension due to Phalgram attacks), Hyderabad achieved their biggest win over Kolkata by 110 runs. SRH posted a massive total of 278/3, led by Heinrich Klaasen's unbeaten 105 (39) and Travis Head's 76 (40). In response, Kolkata was bowled out for 168, marking their heaviest defeat in franchise history in terms of margin of runs.[63]

After defeating KKR in their last league stage match SRH finished 6th on table and with KKR ending up at 8th on the table of this season.

2026 : A win and a loss (present)

In 2026, when both teams met for the first time at Eden Gardens, Kolkata, SRH who was praised for strong batting line up but bowling attack under scanner defeated KKR on 2 April as SRH got good start of 84/1 off the powerplay courtesy Travis Head's 46 (21) and Abhishek Sharma's score of 48. SRH finished eventually on 226/9 with the help of Heinrich Klassen and Nitish Kumar Reddy. During the second innings KKR too had got off to a good start before Harsh Dubey dismissed Finn Allen in Powerplay followed by KKR captain Ajinkya Rahane and Cameron Green getting out towards the end of powerplay. Following that, KKR struggled to maintain momentum and collapsed to 161/10 as SRH bowlers kept striking regularly and fielded well.

During the return fixture at home in Hyderabad on May 3, 2026, SRH got off to rapid start with 71/1 off the powerplay courtesy Travis Head and Abhishek Sharma. Once Travis Head got out when team score was 105/2 off 8.6 overs, then followed a cluster of wickets with SRH collapsing to 165/10 in 19 overs. KKR then got off to a flier courtesy Finn Allen, despite SRH Captain Cummins getting the first breakthrough by dismissing Allen, the damage was already done by then, KKR captain Ajinkya Rahane and Angkrish Raghuvanshi partnership ensured that KKR cruised to a 7 wicket win with 10 balls to spare.

As of May 2026, KKR lead the overall head to head record with 21 wins, 11 losses (out of 32) against the Sunrisers.

== Sponsors ==
Period	Kit supplier	Shirt sponsor (front)	Shirt sponsor (back)
2013–2014	Puma	MakeMyTrip	SpiceJet
2014–2015	TYKA	WHSmith	SpiceJet
2015–2016	TYKA	Red FM	Idea
2016–2017	TYKA	UltraTech Cement	Idea
2017–2018	TYKA	UltraTech Cement	Red FM
2018–2019	TYKA	Red FM	Manforce
2019–2020	TYKA	Coolwinks	Red FM
2020–2022	TYKA	JK Lakshmi Cement	Ralco Tyres
2022–2023	Wrogn	Cars24	BKT
2023–2024	Wrogn	FanCraze	BKT
2024–2026	Wrogn	Dream11	BKT
2026–present	Wrogn	Shree Cement	BKT

== See also ==
- List of Sunrisers Hyderabad records
- Deccan Chargers
- Sunrisers Eastern Cape
- Sunrisers Leeds
- 2026 Sunrisers Hyderabad season – Indian Premier League cricket team
