= David Werner (disambiguation) =

David Werner (born 1934) is an American author.

David Werner may also refer to:

- David Werner (musician), American singer
- David Werner (real estate investor) (born 1953), American real estate investor

== See also ==
- David Warner (disambiguation)
