= David Warner =

David or Dave Warner may refer to:

== Sports ==
- Dave Warner (strongman) (born 1969), Northern Ireland strongman competitor
- David Bruce Warner (born 1970), South African alpine skier
- David Warner (cricketer) (born 1986), Australian cricketer

== Others ==
- David Warner (actor) (1941–2022), British actor
- David William Warner (born 1941), former Speaker of the Ontario, Canada legislature
- Dave Warner (musician) (born 1953), Australian rock musician and author
- Dave Warner, neuroscientist and leader of the Afghanistan aid group Synergy Strike Force

== See also ==
- David Werner (disambiguation)
- David Warner Hagen (1931–2022), American judge
