= Sakib Hussain =

Indian cricketer

Personal information
- Full name: Sakib Hussain
- Born: 14 December 2004 (age 21); Gopalganj, Bihar, India
- Batting: Right footed
- Bowling: Right-arm fast-medium
- Role: Bowler

Domestic team information
- Years: Team
- 2022–2023: Bihar
- 2024: Kolkata Knight Riders
- 2026–present: Sunrisers Hyderabad

Sakib Hussain (born 14 December 2004) is an Indian cricketer who plays for Bihar in domestic cricket and Sunrisers Hyderabad in the Indian Premier League (IPL). He is a right-arm fast-medium bowler known for his pace and ability to extract bounce.

== Early life ==
Hussain was born on 14 December 2004 in Gopalganj, Bihar. Coming from a humble background, his father, Ali Ahmed Hussain, worked as a local laborer. Initially, Hussain aspired to join the Indian Army to serve the nation before shifting his focus entirely to sports. He began playing cricket with a tennis ball in his village, often practicing on rugged terrains before transitioning to professional leather-ball cricket at a local academy. Due to the family's severe financial struggles, his mother reportedly sold her gold ornaments to fund his travel and the purchase of his first professional cricket kit. He later moved to Kolkata to refine his bowling skills, where his pace was noticed by talent scouts.

== Domestic career ==
Hussain made his Twenty20 debut for Bihar on 14 October 2022 against Andhra in the 2022–23 Syed Mushtaq Ali Trophy. He impressed a lot of people in the tournament, picking up four wickets for 20 runs in just his second match. In 2024, he made his first-class debut in the Ranji Trophy for Bihar. During the 2025–26 domestic season, he became the leading wicket-taker for Bihar in the Vijay Hazare Trophy, helping the team reach the Plate Group final.

== Indian Premier League ==
In December 2023, Hussain was signed by Kolkata Knight Riders (KKR) for his base price of ₹20 lakh in the auction for the 2024 Indian Premier League. Though he did not feature in the playing XI during the 2024 season, he remained with the squad as they secured the championship title. At the 2026 Indian Premier League auction, he was acquired by Sunrisers Hyderabad (SRH) for ₹30 lakh. On 13 April 2026, he made his IPL debut against Rajasthan Royals at the Rajiv Gandhi International Cricket Stadium. He delivered a match-winning performance on debut, taking 4 wickets for 24 runs, including the wicket of Yashasvi Jaiswal in his opening over.
