= Cars24 =

Online used car marketplace

Cars24 Services Private Limited
- Type: Private
- Industry: Used cars
- Founded: 2015; 11 years ago
- Founder: Vikram Chopra; Mehul Agrawal; Gajendra Jangid; Ruchit Agarwal
- Headquarters: Gurgaon, Haryana, India
- Area served: India; Australia; UAE
- Key people: Vikram Chopra (co-founder and CEO); Ruchit Agarwal (co-founder and group CFO)
- Services: Car sales; Resale Paperwork; Loans
- Revenue: ₹5,092 crore (US$540 million) (FY26)
- Net income: ▼₹−441 crore (US$−47 million) (FY26)
- Subsidiaries: Cars24 Financial Services
- Website: cars24.com

Cars24 is an Indian online used car marketplace and retailer with its headquarters in Gurgaon, Haryana. Founded in 2015, it began by buying cars from private owners and selling them to dealers through online auctions, and later added direct sales to consumers, vehicle financing through a non-banking financial company, and operations outside India. It currently operates in India, the United Arab Emirates and Australia.

The company raised venture funding that valued it at $3.3 billion in December 2021. From 2022 it cut jobs on several occasions and closed its operations in Indonesia, Saudi Arabia and Thailand. In 2026, it began moving its parent company from Singapore to India ahead of a planned initial public offering.

== History ==
Cars24 was founded in 2015 by Vikram Chopra, Mehul Agrawal, Gajendra Jangid, and Ruchit Agarwal. In 2021, the company expanded its operations internationally to the United Arab Emirates, Thailand and Australia..

The Cars24 platform facilitates the transaction and has an offline presence. Apart from selling used cars, the company's services include paperwork such as transferring the car to the name of the new owner which enables end-to-end transactions, and offers an online auction platform to businesses looking to sell their pre-owned cars. In 2019, the company started offering verified used cars where the company offered a buyback guarantee on the vehicles verified by inspection.

The company operates 202 branches across 73 cities in India as of 2019. Apart from its own branches, the company has a tie-up with more than 10,000 channel partners across 230 cities in India. The company touched 150,000 annual car sales in 2019.

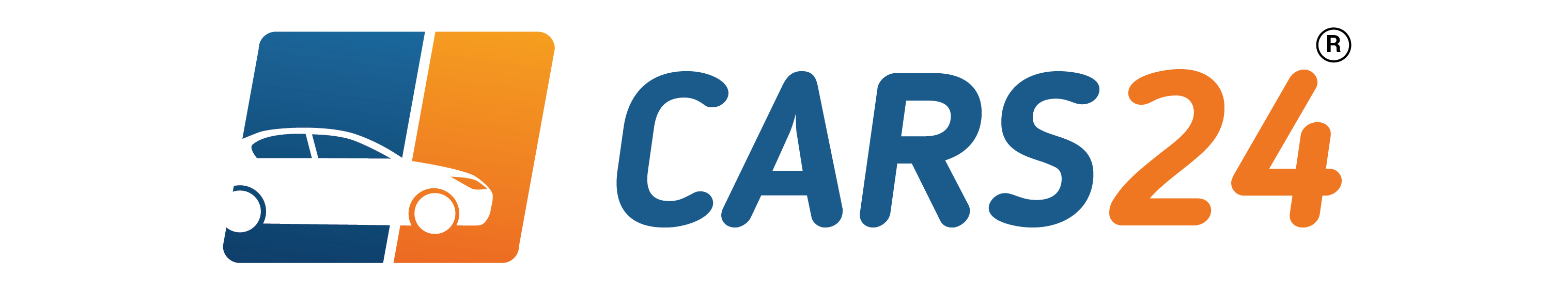
Old logo of CARS24

In May 2020, the company launched Cars24 Moto. Cars24 Moto is a service which allows customers to sell used two-wheelers such as motorbikes, mopeds and scooters on its platform. It also launched a service offering vehicles inspection services at the customers location in place of their branch.

In May 2022, Cars24 laid off about 600 employees, all in India and mostly in junior roles, from a workforce of close to 9,000. The company described the exits as performance-linked and routine. In May 2023, it closed its operations in Indonesia, where nearly 100 people worked, and in Saudi Arabia, saying it would concentrate on India, Australia, Thailand and the UAE.

In April 2024 the company announced that it would stop operating in Thailand and close its branches there.

In April 2025, the company laid off about 200 employees across functions. In May, it laid off 120 more and closed two non-core ventures, the spare-parts platform Inspare and the car-servicing business FourDoor. In September 2025, Cars24, CarDekho and Spinny were in early talks with bankers about public listings that could raise more than $1 billion combined.

=== 2026 ===
In January 2026, Cars24 acquired CarInfo, a vehicle information app operated by Velocitypedia Private Limited.

In April 2026, co-founders Gajendra Jangid and Mehul Agrawal stepped back from executive roles. Agrawal remains on the board.

== Operations ==
Cars24 runs a wholesale business, in which it buys cars from owners and sells them to dealers, and a retail business that sells used cars to consumers. Sales of cars through its auction and retail businesses made up about 87% of its operating revenue in India in FY26. The rest came from financial services, service fees, parking fees and other offerings such as insurance assistance and warranties. In 2025 it moved its wholesale business from an inventory model, in which the full value of each vehicle was recorded as revenue, to a transaction model in which only the commission is recorded. Inc42 reported that purchases of cars made up about 79% of its expenses in FY22. Makkar said in 2026 that Cars24 sold cars at retail in 25 Indian cities and operated in three Australian cities.
