= Rahul Tripathi =

Indian cricketer (born 1991)

Personal information
- Full name: Rahul Ajay Tripathi
- Born: 2 March 1991 (age 35); Ranchi, Jharkhand, India
- Batting: Right-handed
- Bowling: Right-arm medium
- Role: Top-order batter

International information
- National side: India (2023-2026)
- T20I debut (cap 102): 5 January 2023 v Sri Lanka
- Last T20I: 1 February 2023 v New Zealand

Domestic team information
- Years: Team
- 2010–present: Maharashtra
- 2017: Rising Pune Supergiant
- 2018–2019: Rajasthan Royals
- 2020–2021, 2026: Kolkata Knight Riders
- 2022–2024: Sunrisers Hyderabad
- 2025: Chennai Super Kings

Career statistics
Competition	T20I	FC	LA	T20
Matches	5	56	73	167
Runs scored	97	2,867	2,177	3,644
Batting average	19.40	32.21	34.01	25.30
100s/50s	0/0	7/15	4/12	0/19
Top score	44	132	156*	93
Balls bowled	–	1,922	573	228
Wickets	–	13	7	12
Bowling average	–	74.92	76.28	23.75
5 wickets in innings	–	0	0	1
10 wickets in match	–	0	0	0
Best bowling	–	2/10	2/25	5/27
Catches/stumpings	3/–	34/–	22/–	71/–
Medal record
Men's cricket
Representing India
Asian Games
Gold medal – first place	2022 Hangzhou	Team
- Source: ESPNcricinfo, 18 April 2025

Rahul Ajay Tripathi (born 2 March 1991) is an Indian international cricketer. He represents Maharashtra in domestic cricket and Kolkata Knight Riders in the Indian Premier League.

== Personal life ==
Rahul Ajay Tripathi, born on 2 March 1991 in Ranchi, Jharkhand, is the son of former Army Colonel Ajay Tripathi and Suchitra Tripathi, a housewife. His father, was also a former cricketer who played for the Uttar Pradesh under-22 team in the early 80s.

Growing up in a military family, Rahul faced frequent relocations. His cricket training, initiated at age 9, in Lucknow, was temporarily halted when his father was assigned to Srinagar as part of Operation Parakram. The challenging conditions forced Rahul to take a hiatus from cricket at the age of 10.

Upon relocating to Pune in 2003, Rahul's cricket journey resumed under his father's guidance. Enrolled in Pune's Deccan Gymkhana on 20 September 2003, he trained under the mentorship of Kedar Joglekar and Hemant Athalye, establishing this as his cricket alma mater. Achieving notable success in junior cricket, he garnered attention with three consecutive centuries at the U-19 level.

Rahul earned the BCCI award for Best U-25 Cricketer in 2014, paving the way for his rise in first-class cricket and subsequently the Indian Premier League (IPL). Beyond cricket, he excelled academically, completing his Bachelor of Science in mathematics from Sri Parashurambhau Mahavidyalay.

Rahul 's younger sister Rupali Tripathi has represented Maharashtra in basketball.

== Domestic career ==
He was the leading run-scorer for Maharashtra in the 2018–19 Ranji Trophy, with 504 runs in eight matches.

In February 2017, he was bought by the Rising Pune Supergiants team for the 2017 Indian Premier League (IPL). In January 2018, he was bought by the Rajasthan Royals in the 2018 IPL auction. He was released by the Rajasthan Royals ahead of the 2020 IPL auction. In the 2020 IPL auction, he was bought by the Kolkata Knight Riders ahead of the 2020 Indian Premier League.

In February 2022, he was bought by the Sunrisers Hyderabad in the 2022 IPL Auction where he had his best IPL season till then, he was then released after 2024 IPL and bought by Chennai Super Kings in the 2025 IPL Auction and will represent the team along with his domestic team captain Ruturaj Gaikwad, reuniting with MS Dhoni with whom he represented Rising Pune Supergiant.

== International career ==
In June 2022, he was named in India's Twenty20 International (T20I) squad for their two-match series against Ireland. The following month, he was named in India's One Day International (ODI) squad for their series against Zimbabwe. In December 2022, Tripathi was selected to play for India in the T20I series against Sri Lanka. The following month, on 5 January 2023, Tripathi made his Twenty20 International debut for India at the age of 31 against Sri Lanka in the second match of the series at Maharashtra Cricket Association Stadium, Pune, he was dismissed for 5 runs in his debut innings.
