= T. Natarajan =

Indian cricketer (born 1991)

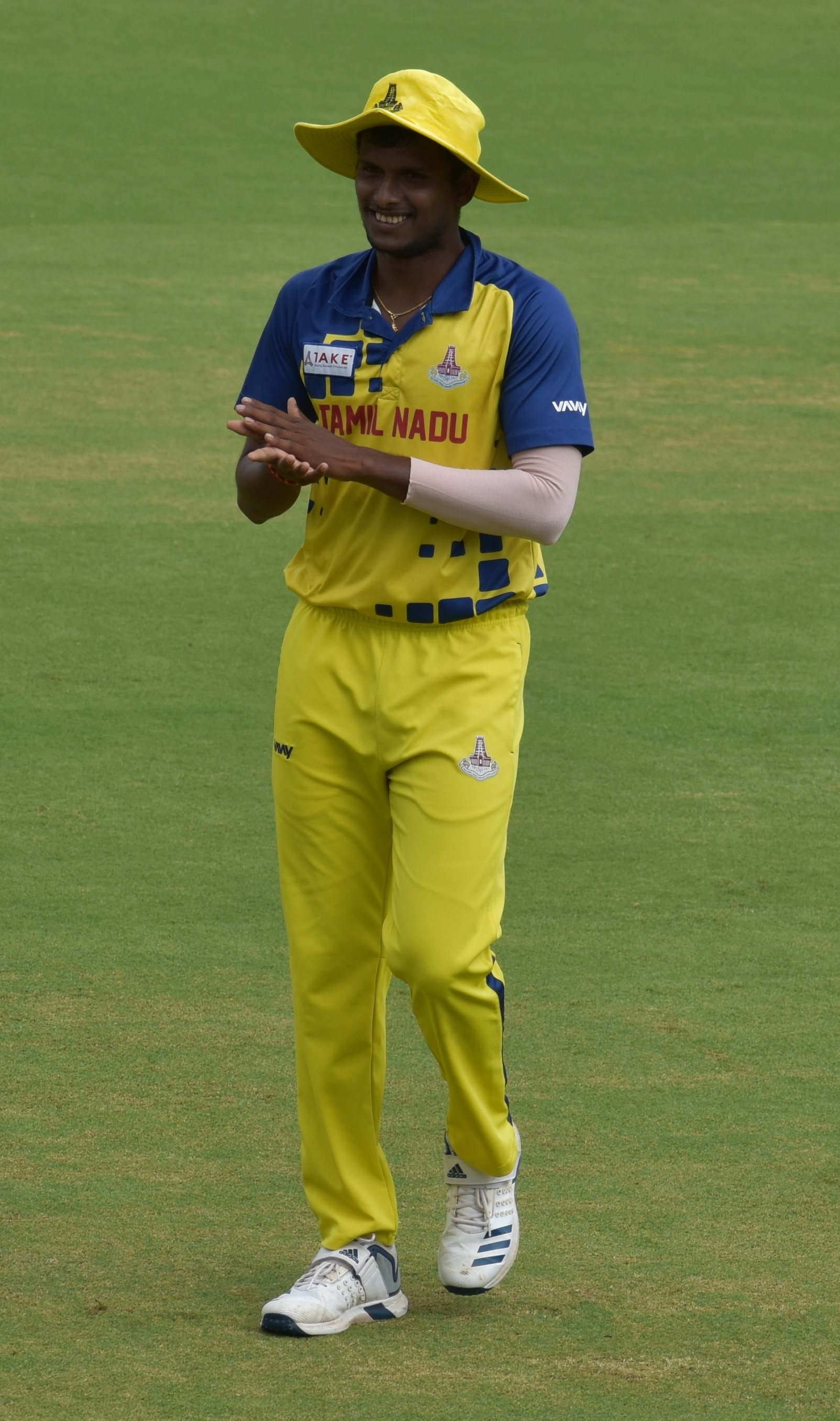
- Natarajan during the 2019–20 Vijay Hazare Trophy

Personal information
- Full name: Thangarasu Natarajan
- Born: 4 April 1991 (age 35); Salem, Tamil Nadu, India
- Nickname: Nattu
- Batting: Left-handed
- Bowling: Left-arm medium
- Role: Bowler

International information
- National side: India (2020–2021)
- Only Test (cap 300): 15 January 2021 v Australia
- ODI debut (cap 232): 2 December 2020 v Australia
- Last ODI: 28 March 2021 v England
- ODI shirt no.: 4
- T20I debut (cap 83): 4 December 2020 v Australia
- Last T20I: 20 March 2021 v England
- T20I shirt no.: 4

Domestic team information
- Years: Team
- 2015–present: Tamil Nadu
- 2017: Kings XI Punjab
- 2020–2024; 2027-present: Sunrisers Hyderabad (squad no. 44)
- 2025–2026: Delhi Capitals

Career statistics
Competition	Test	ODI	T20I	FC
Matches	1	2	4	21
Runs scored	1	0	–	29
Batting average	–	–	–	2.07
100s/50s	0/0	0/0	–	0/0
Top score	1*	0*	–	12
Balls bowled	230	120	96	3,658
Wickets	3	3	7	67
Bowling average	39.66	47.66	17.42	27.59
5 wickets in innings	0	0	0	3
10 wickets in match	0	0	0	0
Best bowling	3/78	2/70	3/30	5/41
Catches/stumpings	0/–	0/–	0/–	5/–
- Source: ESPNcricinfo, 26 March 2025

Thangarasu Natarajan (born 4 April 1991) is an Indian international cricketer. He made his debut for the India cricket team in December 2020. Currently he plays for Sunrisers Hyderabad in the Indian Premier League (IPL) and for Tamil Nadu in domestic cricket. He became the first Indian cricketer to make his international debut across all three formats on the same tour when he was playing in India's 2020–21 tour of Australia.

== Early and personal life ==
Natarajan was born in a Tamil family in Chinnappampatti, a village near Salem in Tamil Nadu. His father S. Thangarasu, was a weaver working on a powerloom, and his mother runs a fast-food stall. Natarajan is the eldest of five children.

Natarajan married his schoolmate Pavithra in June 2018. In November 2020, his wife gave birth to their daughter.

== Career ==
Natarajan made his first-class debut for Tamil Nadu in the 2014–15 Ranji Trophy on 5 January 2015. He made his Twenty20 debut for Tamil Nadu in the 2016–17 Inter State Twenty-20 Tournament on 29 January 2017. He made his List A debut for Tamil Nadu in the 2018–19 Vijay Hazare Trophy on 20 September 2018.

In February 2017, Natarajan was bought by the Kings XI Punjab team for the 2017 Indian Premier League for ₹3 crore (equivalent to ₹4.6 crore or US$490,000 in 2026). In January 2018, he was bought by the Sunrisers Hyderabad in the 2018 IPL auction.

On 26 October 2020, Natarajan was named as one of four additional bowlers to travel with the India cricket team for their tour to Australia. On 9 November 2020, he was added to India's Twenty20 International (T20I) squad, replacing Varun Chakravarthy who was ruled out due to an injury. Ahead of the first One Day International (ODI) match, he was added to India's squad as a cover for Navdeep Saini, who was suffering with a back spasm. Natarajan made his ODI debut for India against Australia on 2 December 2020.

Natarajan made his T20I debut for India, in the first T20I against Australia, on 4 December 2020, taking 3/30. In the second T20I, Natarajan picked 2/20 in his 4 overs in a high-scoring match. Natarajan's yorkers, cutters and pace variations in the death overs drew praise. He had figures of 1/33 in the third T20I as India won the series 2–1.

On 30 December 2020, Natarajan was added to India's Test squad ahead of the third match against Australia. He made his Test debut against Australia on 15 January 2021, dismissing Matthew Wade for his first international Test wicket.

In March 2021, Natarajan was part of the limited-overs squads of England's tour of India. He made his first appearance in the high-scoring fifth T20I at Ahmedabad, taking 1/39 as India won the match to clinch the series 3–2. Natarajan appeared in another series-decider, the third ODI against England at Pune, where he replaced the spinner Kuldeep Yadav in what was described as a "tactical move" by captain Virat Kohli. With England needing 14 runs off the last over, Natarajan conceded just 6 runs to help India win the series.

Natarajan played two matches at the 2021 Indian Premier League before being ruled out of the first leg of the tournament with a knee injury. He regained fitness ahead of the second leg of the tournament, before being sidelined due to COVID-19 on the day before Sunrisers Hyderabad's first match.

In February 2022, he was bought by the Sunrisers Hyderabad in the auction for the 2022 Indian Premier League tournament for ₹4 crore (equivalent to ₹4.6 crore or US$490,000 in 2026). He finished as the second highest wicket-taker for his team with 18 wickets from 11 matches.

In November 2024, Delhi Capitals bought him for ₹10.75 crore (equivalent to ₹11 crore or US$1.2 million in 2026) in auction for 2025 Indian Premier League.
