= Umran Malik =

Indian cricketer

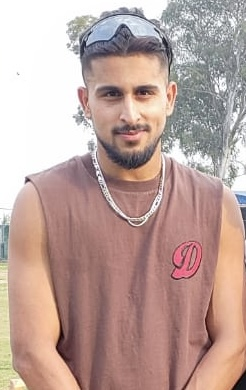
- Umran in 2023

Personal information
- Born: 22 November 1999 (age 26); Jammu, Jammu and Kashmir, India
- Nickname: Jammu Express
- Height: 5 ft 10 in (178 cm)
- Batting: Right-handed
- Bowling: Right-arm fast
- Role: Bowler

International information
- National side: India (2022–2023)
- ODI debut (cap 249): 25 November 2022 v New Zealand
- Last ODI: 29 July 2023 v West Indies
- ODI shirt no.: 21
- T20I debut (cap 98): 26 June 2022 v Ireland
- Last T20I: 1 February 2023 v New Zealand
- T20I shirt no.: 21

Domestic team information
- Years: Team
- 2020/21–present: Jammu and Kashmir
- 2021–2024: Sunrisers Hyderabad (squad no. 24)

Career statistics
Competition	ODI	T20I	FC	LA
Matches	10	8	7	13
Runs scored	2	5	59	16
Batting average	2.00	–	11.80	8.00
100s/50s	0/0	0/0	0/0	0/0
Top score	2*	4*	18	14
Balls bowled	366	139	752	516
Wickets	13	11	12	15
Bowling average	30.69	26.00	46.66	37.26
5 wickets in innings	0	0	0	0
10 wickets in match	0	0	0	0
Best bowling	3/57	3/48	3/25	3/57
Catches/stumpings	2/–	1/–	2/–	3/–
- Source: ESPNcricinfo, 3 August 2023

Umran Malik (born 22 November 1999) is an Indian international cricketer who plays for the Indian cricket team in limited-overs cricket as a right-arm fast bowler. He debuted for India in June 2022 against Ireland. He plays for Jammu and Kashmir in domestic cricket and notably played for Sunrisers Hyderabad in 2022 in the IPL.

== Early life ==
Malik was born in 1999 to father Abdul Rashid, a fruit-seller, and mother Seema Begum. from Gujjar Nagar locality in the city of Jammu.

== Career ==
In April 2021, Malik was selected as one of three net bowlers for 2021 Indian Premier League (IPL) playing for Sunrisers Hyderabad. On 3 October 2021, he made his debut in the IPL, against Kolkata Knight Riders, during the 49th match of 2021 Indian Premier League. He gained attention during the match between Sunrisers Hyderabad and Royal Challengers Bangalore, when he bowled five balls in a row at more than 150 km/h. As a result of his fast-bowling, he was named as a net bowler for India's team for the 2021 ICC Men's T20 World Cup. He made his first-class debut on 23 November 2021, for India A against South Africa A.

He was retained by Sunrisers Hyderabad in the IPL 2022 auction. On 27 April 2022, in the 2022 Indian Premier League match against the Gujarat Titans, Malik took his first five-wicket haul in Twenty20 cricket. Malik was also named as the Emerging Player of the tournament. He bowled the fastest ball by an Indian in IPL clocking 157 km/h in a match against Delhi Capitals.

In May 2022, Malik was named in India's Twenty20 International (T20I) squad for their series against South Africa. The following month, he was named in India's T20I squad for their two-match series against Ireland. He made his T20I debut on 26 June 2022, for India against Ireland. His first ODI debut for the India cricket team in November 2022 against New Zealand. He dismissed Devon Conway as his first wicket.
