= Shashank Singh =

Indian cricketer (born 1991)

Personal information
- Born: 21 November 1991 (age 34)
- Batting: Right-handed
- Bowling: Right-arm medium; Right-arm offbreak
- Role: Batting all-rounder

Domestic team information
- Years: Team
- 2015–2018: Mumbai
- 2018–2019: Puducherry
- 2019–present: Chhattisgarh
- 2017: Delhi Daredevils
- 2019-2021: Rajasthan Royals
- 2022: Sunrisers Hyderabad
- 2024–present: Punjab Kings

Career statistics
Competition	FC	LA	T20
Matches	24	35	110
Runs scored	905	1,054	1,763
Batting average	29.19	40.53	25.55
100s/50s	1/6	2/3	0/10
Top score	122	154	68*
Balls bowled	1,401	1,149	504
Wickets	16	37	25
Bowling average	47.87	29.86	29.24
5 wickets in innings	0	1	0
10 wickets in match	0	0	0
Best bowling	3/43	5/20	3/4
Catches/stumpings	6/–	7/–	35/–
- Source: Cricinfo, 27 July 2026

Shashank Singh (born 21 November 1991) is an Indian cricketer who plays for Punjab Kings. He is a right-handed batsman, as well as a right-arm offbreak bowler.

== Career ==
Shashank played club village cricket in the north east of England for Boldon CACC. He impressed heavily in the local region, and showed great potential.

He made his List A debut on 10 December 2015 in the 2015–16 Vijay Hazare Trophy. In February 2017, he was bought by the Delhi Daredevils team for the 2017 Indian Premier League for 10 lakhs.

In December 2018, he was bought by Rajasthan Royals in the player auction for the 2019 Indian Premier League. He made his first-class debut on 9 December 2019, for Chhattisgarh in the 2019–20 Ranji Trophy.

In February 2022, he was bought by Sunrisers Hyderabad in the auction for the 2022 Indian Premier League tournament.

In November 2023, he became the first Indian list A-cricketer to score 150 runs and take five wickets in the same match against Manipur, during the 2023–24 Vijay Hazare Trophy. In December 2023, he was bought by the Punjab Kings for the 2024 Indian Premier League for 20 lakhs. On 4 April 2024, he scored 61 not out from 29 balls against Gujarat Titans and was instrumental in the victory for his side Punjab Kings.
