= Priyam Garg =

Indian cricketer (born 2000)

Personal information
- Full name: Priyam K Garg
- Born: 30 November 2000 (age 25); Meerut, Uttar Pradesh, India
- Batting: Right-handed
- Bowling: Right-arm medium
- Role: Top-order batter

Domestic team information
- Years: Team
- 2018–present: Uttar Pradesh
- 2020–2022: Sunrisers Hyderabad
- 2023: Delhi Capitals
Medal record
Men's Cricket
Representing India
ICC Under-19 Cricket World Cup
Runner-up	2020 South Africa
- Source: ESPNcricinfo, 27 September 2021

Priyam Garg (born 30 November 2000) is an Indian cricketer. He plays for Uttar Pradesh ranji team. He made his List A debut for Uttar Pradesh in the 2018–19 Vijay Hazare Trophy on 19 September 2018. He made his first-class debut for Uttar Pradesh in the 2018–19 Ranji Trophy on 1 November 2018. In December 2018, during the match against Tripura, he scored his maiden double century in first-class cricket. He made his Twenty20 debut for Uttar Pradesh in the 2018–19 Syed Mushtaq Ali Trophy on 21 February 2019.

In August 2019, he was named in the India Green squad for the 2019–20 Duleep Trophy. In October 2019, he was named in India C's squad for the 2019–20 Deodhar Trophy. In the 2019–20 Vijay Hazare Trophy, he scored 287 runs in six matches. In December 2019, he was named as the captain of India's squad for the 2020 Under-19 Cricket World Cup. He led India to the finals where they lost to Bangladesh.

In February 2022, he was bought by the Sunrisers Hyderabad in the auction for the 2022 Indian Premier League tournament. He was released by Sunrisers Hyderabad before the 2023 Indian Premier League Auction and went unsold during the auction.
