= 2013 Irani Cup =

Rest of India	Mumbai
526 & 389/5d	409 & 160/4
- Match drawn; Rest of India won on 1st innings
- Date: 6 February 2013 – 10 February 2013
- Venue: Wankhede Stadium, Mumbai
- Player of the match: Suresh Raina (Rest of India)

The 2013 Irani Cup, also called 2013 Irani Trophy, was the 51st season of the Irani Cup, a first-class cricket competition in India. In 2013, the fixture was moved to a date immediately after the Ranji Trophy final, resulting in there being two Irani Cup matches in the 2012/13 season. The fixture has since remained at the end of the season, and is played shortly after the Ranji Trophy final.

The 2013 Irani Cup was played from 6 February 2013 to 10 February 2013 between the 2012–13 Ranji champions Mumbai and Rest of India. Wankhede Stadium, the home ground of Mumbai, hosted the match. The match was drawn and Rest of India retained the Irani Cup by virtue of their first innings lead.

== Squads ==
Squads
Mumbai	Rest of India
Ajit Agarkar (c)	Virender Sehwag (c)
Ankeet Chavan	Shikhar Dhawan
Vishal Dabholkar	Harbhajan Singh (vc)
Wasim Jaffer	Abhimanyu Mithun
Javed Khan	Pragyan Ojha
Dhawal Kulkarni	Ishwar Pandey
Abhishek Nayar (vc)	Suresh Raina
Kaustubh Pawar	Ambati Rayudu
Ajinkya Rahane	Wriddhiman Saha (wk)
Hiken Shah	Jalaj Saxena
Rohit Sharma	Mohammed Shami
Aditya Tare (wk)	Sreesanth
Sachin Tendulkar	Manoj Tiwary
Shardul Thakur	Murali Vijay
Suryakumar Yadav

== Lead-up ==
Mumbai captain Ajit Agarkar was ruled out of the Irani Cup due to a groin injury. Allrounder Abhishek Nayar was named the captain of the side.

A stomach bug forced the RoI captain Virender Sehwag to sit out for the match, and Harbhajan Singh lead the team instead.

== Scorecard ==
Innings 1

Rest of India 1st innings
Player	Status	Runs	Balls	4s	6s	Strike rate
Shikhar Dhawan	b Thakur	63	101	11	0	62.37
Murali Vijay	b Nayar	116	206	17	1	56.31
Manoj Tiwary	lbw b Nayar	37	67	7	0	55.22
Ambati Rayudu	c Jaffer b Sharma	51	83	9	0	61.44
Suresh Raina	c Thakur b Chavan	134	169	14	5	79.28
Wriddhiman Saha	lbw b Kulkarni	17	19	4	0	89.47
Harbhajan Singh	c Nayar b Kulkarni	16	15	3	0	106.66
Abhimanyu Mithun	lbw b Chavan	51	90	9	1	56.66
Pragyan Ojha	c Kulkarni b Dabholkar	0	7	0	0	0.00
Sreesanth	not out	1	19	0	0	5.26
Ishwar Pandey	c Rahane b Chavan	13	14	1	1	92.85
Extras	(lb 4, w 1, nb 5)	10				
Total	(all out; 130.1 overs)	526				

Fall of wickets: 1–144 (Dhawan, 38.1 ov), 2–222 (Tiwary, 58.6 ov), 3–231 (Vijay, 62.6 ov), 4–309 (Rayudu, 83.2 ov), 5–330 (Saha, 88.5 ov), 6–352 (Harbhajan, 94.4 ov), 7–505 (Mithun, 122.4 ov), 8–506 (Ojha, 123.6 ov), 9–512 (Raina, 124.4 ov), 10–526 (Pandey, 130.1 ov)

Mumbai bowling
Bowler	Overs	Maidens	Runs	Wickets	Econ	Wides	NBs
Javed Khan	18	6	45	0	2.50	{{{wides}}}	{{{no-balls}}}
Dhawal Kulkarni	27	5	107	2	3.96	{{{wides}}}	{{{no-balls}}}
Shardul Thakur	18	1	82	1	4.55	{{{wides}}}	{{{no-balls}}}
Vishal Dabholkar	26	3	119	1	4.57	{{{wides}}}	{{{no-balls}}}
Abhishek Nayar	25	10	70	2	2.80	{{{wides}}}	{{{no-balls}}}
Ankeet Chavan	10.1	1	56	3	5.50	{{{wides}}}	{{{no-balls}}}
Rohit Sharma	6	2	33	1	5.50	{{{wides}}}	{{{no-balls}}}

Innings 2

Mumbai 1st innings
Player	Status	Runs	Balls	4s	6s	Strike rate
Wasim Jaffer	c Rayudu b Sreesanth	80	126	11	1	63.49
Aditya Tare	c Tiwary b Pandey	6	9	1	0	66.66
Ajinkya Rahane	lbw b Harbhajan	83	183	9	1	45.35
Shardul Thakur	c Tiwary b Pandey	4	16	1	0	25.00
Sachin Tendulkar	not out	140	197	18	2	71.06
Rohit Sharma	c Ojha b Harbhajan	0	12	0	0	0.00
Abhishek Nayar	c Vijay b Mithun	1	12	0	0	8.33
Ankeet Chavan	c Saha b Mithun	49	89	8	0	55.05
Dhawal Kulkarni	c Vijay b Ojha	10	38	1	0	26.31
Javed Khan	c Mithun b Harbhajan	8	15	2	0	53.33
Vishal Dabholkar	lbw b Ojha	0	1	0	0	0.00
Extras	(b 6, lb 7, w 2, nb 13)	28				
Total	(all out; 114.1 overs)	409				

Fall of wickets: 1–14 (Tare, 3.3 ov), 2–146 (Jaffer, 39.2 ov), 3–161 (Thakur, 44.1 ov), 4–234 (Rahane, 64.5 ov), 5–254 (Sharma, 70.4 ov), 6–257 (Nayar, 73.4 ov), 7–360 (Chavan, 99.4 ov), 8–399 (Kulkarni, 110.4 ov), 9–409 (Khan, 113.5 ov), 10–409 (Dabholkar, 114.1 ov)

Rest of India bowling
Bowler	Overs	Maidens	Runs	Wickets	Econ	Wides	NBs
Sreesanth	21	3	80	1	3.80	{{{wides}}}	{{{no-balls}}}
Ishwar Pandey	24	6	76	2	3.16	{{{wides}}}	{{{no-balls}}}
Abhimanyu Mithun	21	1	73	2	3.47	{{{wides}}}	{{{no-balls}}}
Pragyan Ojha	26.1	1	103	2	3.93	{{{wides}}}	{{{no-balls}}}
Harbhajan Singh	21	4	64	3	3.04	{{{wides}}}	{{{no-balls}}}
Manoj Tiwary	1	1	0	0	0.00	{{{wides}}}	{{{no-balls}}}

Innings 3

Rest of India 2nd innings
Player	Status	Runs	Balls	4s	6s	Strike rate
Shikhar Dhawan	c Nayar b Kulkarni	0	6	0	0	0.00
Murali Vijay	c Sharma b Thakur	35	61	5	0	57.37
Sreesanth	run out (Sharma)	18	56	3	0	32.14
Manoj Tiwary	c Jaffer b Dabholkar	69	166	5	3	41.56
Ambati Rayudu	not out	156	289	12	4	53.97
Suresh Raina	c Rahane b Dabholkar	71	106	8	3	66.98
Wriddhiman Saha	not out	20	43	2	1	46.51
Harbhajan Singh						
Abhimanyu Mithun						
Pragyan Ojha						
Ishwar Pandey						
Extras	(b 3, lb 2, w 8, nb 7)	20				
Total	(5 wickets dec; 120 overs)	389				

Fall of wickets: 1–0 (Dhawan, 0.6 ov), 2–55 (Sreesanth, 17.6 ov), 3–67 (Vijay, 23.1 ov), 4–207 (Tiwary, 72.2 ov), 5–352 (Raina, 106.5 ov)

Mumbai bowling
Bowler	Overs	Maidens	Runs	Wickets	Econ	Wides	NBs
Dhawal Kulkarni	17	6	35	1	2.05	{{{wides}}}	{{{no-balls}}}
Abhishek Nayar	9	3	28	0	3.11	{{{wides}}}	{{{no-balls}}}
Javed Khan	14	6	33	0	2.35	{{{wides}}}	{{{no-balls}}}
Shardul Thakur	12	1	44	1	3.66	{{{wides}}}	{{{no-balls}}}
Ankeet Chavan	38	4	126	0	3.31	{{{wides}}}	{{{no-balls}}}
Vishal Dabholkar	25	1	97	2	3.88	{{{wides}}}	{{{no-balls}}}
Rohit Sharma	5	0	21	0	4.20	{{{wides}}}	{{{no-balls}}}

Innings 4

Mumbai 2nd innings
Player	Status	Runs	Balls	4s	6s	Strike rate
Wasim Jaffer	not out	101	141	10	0	71.63
Aditya Tare	c Dhawan b Harbhajan Singh	11	41	2	0	26.82
Ajinkya Rahane	c Vijay b Harbhajan Singh	25	47	2	1	53.19
Rohit Sharma	c Mithun b Ojha	1	7	0	0	14.28
Abhishek Nayar	c Saha b Raina	2	43	0	0	4.65
Ankeet Chavan	not out	12	47	1	0	25.53
Extras	(b 4, lb 2, nb 2)	8				
Total	(4 wickets; 54 overs)	160				

Fall of Wickets:1-36 (Tare, 13.3 ov), 2-89 (Rahane, 27.3 ov), 3-104 (Sharma, 30.3 ov), 4-123 (Nayar 41.5 ov)

Rest of India bowling
Bowler	Overs	Maidens	Runs	Wickets	Econ	Wides	NBs
Sreesanth	6	2	7	0	1.16	{{{wides}}}	{{{no-balls}}}
Ishwar Pandey	3	2	8	0	2.66	{{{wides}}}	{{{no-balls}}}
Pragyan Ojha	12	0	45	1	3.75	{{{wides}}}	{{{no-balls}}}
Harbhajan Singh	16	1	38	2	2.37	{{{wides}}}	{{{no-balls}}}
Abhimanyu Mithun	2	0	14	0	7.00	{{{wides}}}	{{{no-balls}}}
Suresh Raina	7	1	14	1	2.00	{{{wides}}}	{{{no-balls}}}
Manoj Tiwary	4	1	17	0	4.25	{{{wides}}}	{{{no-balls}}}
Ambati Rayudu	3	0	10	0	3.33	{{{wides}}}	{{{no-balls}}}
Murali Vijay	1	0	1	0	1.00	{{{wides}}}	{{{no-balls}}}

Result: Match Drawn; Rest of India won on 1st innings
