= 2012–13 Ranji Trophy =

- The Ranji Trophy, which the winners get.
- Administrator: BCCI
- Cricket format: First-class cricket
- Tournament format: Round-robin then knockout
- Champions: Mumbai (40th title)
- Participants: 27
- Most runs: Jiwanjot Singh (Punjab) (995)
- Most wickets: Ishwar Pandey (Madhya Pradesh) (48)

The 2012–13 Ranji Trophy was the 79th season of the Ranji Trophy. It was contested by 27 teams divided into three groups of nine teams each. The top three teams from Groups A and B proceeded to the quarterfinals along with the top two teams from Group C. Mumbai won this year's trophy for the 40th time by beating Saurashtra in the final at the Wankhede.

The season had a different grouping system compared to that of the previous seasons, which had Elite and Plate divisions. The new system also increased the number of matches of the tournament. The points awarded to outright wins were increased from five to six in order to encourage results. The knock-out matches will be played across five days instead of four. All these changes were recommended by the BCCI's Technical Committee in June 2012.

== Points system ==
27 teams were divided into three groups of nine teams each. The top three teams from Groups A and B proceed to the quarterfinals along with the top two teams from Group C. The winner of this knock-out tournament wins the Ranji Trophy. These knock-out matches are decided on the first innings result if the final result is a draw.

Points in the group stage of the tournament are awarded as follows:

| Scenario | Points |
|---|---|
| Outright win | 6 |
| Bonus point (for innings and 10 wicket wins) | 1 |
| 1st innings lead (in case of draw) | 3 |
| 1st innings deficit (in case of draw) | 1 |
| No result | 1 |
| Outright defeat | 0 |

== Groups ==
Group A

- Bengal
- Gujarat
- Hyderabad
- Madhya Pradesh
- Mumbai
- Punjab
- Railways
- Rajasthan
- Saurashtra

Group B

- Baroda
- Delhi
- Haryana
- Karnataka
- Maharashtra
- Odisha
- Tamil Nadu
- Uttar Pradesh
- Vidarbha

Group C

- Andhra
- Assam
- Goa
- Himachal Pradesh
- Jammu and Kashmir
- Jharkhand
- Kerala
- Services
- Tripura

== League table ==
Group A

| Teams | Matches | Won | Lost | Draw/NR | Points | Quotient |
|---|---|---|---|---|---|---|
| Punjab | 8 | 4 | 2 | 2 | 32 | 1.276 |
| Saurashtra | 8 | 2 | 1 | 5 | 23 | 1.198 |
| Mumbai | 8 | 1 | 0 | 7 | 23 | 1.423 |
| Gujarat | 8 | 2 | 0 | 6 | 22 | 0.922 |
| Railways | 8 | 2 | 0 | 6 | 21 | 0.962 |
| Madhya Pradesh | 8 | 2 | 2 | 4 | 20 | 1.035 |
| Bengal | 8 | 1 | 4 | 3 | 13 | 0.805 |
| Rajasthan | 8 | 0 | 3 | 5 | 11 | 0.741 |
| Hyderabad | 8 | 0 | 2 | 6 | 10 | 0.800 |

Group B

| Teams | Matches | Won | Lost | Draw/NR | Points | Quotient |
|---|---|---|---|---|---|---|
| Uttar Pradesh | 8 | 4 | 0 | 4 | 33 | 1.365 |
| Baroda | 8 | 2 | 1 | 5 | 22 | 1.019 |
| Karnataka | 8 | 2 | 1 | 5 | 21 | 1.081 |
| Delhi | 8 | 2 | 4 | 2 | 20 | 1.251 |
| Vidarbha | 8 | 2 | 0 | 6 | 20 | 0.840 |
| Orissa | 8 | 2 | 4 | 2 | 16 | 0.825 |
| Tamil Nadu | 8 | 1 | 1 | 6 | 14 | 0.947 |
| Haryana | 8 | 1 | 3 | 4 | 14 | 0.790 |
| Maharashtra | 8 | 0 | 3 | 5 | 11 | 0.930 |

Group C

| Teams | Matches | Won | Lost | Draw/NR | Points | Quotient |
|---|---|---|---|---|---|---|
| Services | 8 | 2 | 1 | 5 | 26 | 1.198 |
| Jharkhand | 8 | 3 | 2 | 3 | 24 | 1.068 |
| Andhra | 8 | 1 | 0 | 7 | 24 | 1.089 |
| Assam | 8 | 2 | 2 | 4 | 21 | 0.893 |
| Kerala | 8 | 2 | 1 | 5 | 19 | 1.082 |
| Goa | 8 | 0 | 0 | 8 | 16 | 1.119 |
| Jammu and Kashmir | 8 | 2 | 3 | 3 | 15 | 0.772 |
| Himachal Pradesh | 8 | 0 | 1 | 7 | 15 | 1.284 |
| Tripura | 8 | 1 | 3 | 4 | 10 | 0.691 |

== Knockouts ==
=== Knockout tree ===
Quarter-finals
6–10 Jan 2013 – Jamshedpur
Punjab | FIL
Jharkhand
6–10 Jan 2013 – Rajkot
Saurashtra | FIL
Karnataka
6–10 Jan 2013 – Mumbai
Baroda
Mumbai | FIL
6–8 Jan 2013 – Indore
Uttar Pradesh
Services | WIN

Semi-finals
16–20 Jan 2013 – Rajkot
Punjab
Saurashtra | WIN
16–20 Jan 2013 – Delhi
Mumbai | FIL
Services

Final
26–30 Jan 2013 – Mumbai
Mumbai | WIN
Saurashtra

=== Quarterfinals ===
6–10 Jan 2013
Scorecard

| Jharkhand (H) | v | Punjab |
| 401 (149 overs); Ishank Jaggi 132 (251); Siddarth Kaul 4/78 (37 overs) | | 699/3d (229 overs); Taruwar Kohli 300* (609); Shahbaz Nadeem 2/193 (83 overs) |
| 33/0 (13 overs); Manish Vardhan 19* (39) |

Match drawn
Punjab advance on first innings lead
Keenan Stadium, Jamshedpur
Umpires: Sanjay Hazare and C. K. Nandan

- Jharkhand won the toss and elected to bat
- Punjab advance to the semi-finals

6–10 Jan 2013
Scorecard

| Saurashtra (H) | v | Karnataka |
| 469 (165.3 overs); Arpit Vasavada 152* (357); Abhimanyu Mithun 3/79 (25 overs) | | 396 (102.2 overs); Manish Pandey 177 (228); Kamlesh Makvana 3/91 (23 overs) |
| 718/9 (167 overs); Cheteshwar Pujara 352 (427); Krishnappa Gowtham 4/206 (48 overs) |

Match drawn
Saurashtra advance on first innings lead
Saurashtra University Ground, Rajkot
Umpires: K. Hariharan and Subroto Das

- Saurashtra won the toss and elected to bat
- Saurashtra advance to the semi-finals

6–10 Jan 2013
Scorecard

| Mumbai (H) | v | Baroda |
| 645/9d (180 overs); Wasim Jaffer 150 (279); Murtuja Vahora 4/119 (48 overs) | | 271 (102.4 overs); Ambati Rayudu 89* (152); Vishal Dabholkar 3/88 (34.5 overs) |
| 295/6d (87 overs); Kaustubh Pawar 115 (234); Bhargav Bhatt 3/106 (37 overs) | | 137/3 (42 overs); Aditya Waghmode 60 (81); Ankeet Chavan 2/42 (15 overs) |

Match drawn
Mumbai advance on first innings lead
Wankhede Stadium, Mumbai
Umpires: Adrian Holdstock (RSA) and Krishnaraj Srinath

- Mumbai won the toss and elected to bat
- First class debut: Vishal Dabholkar
  Mumbai advance to the semi-finals

6–10 Jan 2013
Scorecard

| Uttar Pradesh | v | Services (H) |
| 134 (38.4 overs); Imtiyaz Ahmed 53* (35); Shadab Nazar 5/51 (13 overs) | | 263 (68 overs); Rajat Paliwal 112 (133); Ankit Rajpoot 5/61 (15 overs) |
| 241 (78 overs); Tanmay Srivastava 54 (157); Suraj Yadav 7/71 (32 overs) | | 116/5 (27.3 overs); Soumik Chatterjee 34* (46); Ankit Rajpoot 5/36 (11 overs) |

Services won by 5 wickets
Holkar Cricket Stadium, Indore
Umpires: Rob Bailey (Eng) and Amiesh Saheba

- Services won the toss and elected to field
- Services advance to the semi-finals

=== Semifinals ===
16–20 Jan 2013
Scorecard

| Saurashtra (H) | v | Punjab |
| 477 (155 overs); Sheldon Jackson 107 (172); Sarabjit Ladda 3/109 (41 overs) | | 299 (110.1 overs); Ravi Inder Singh 74 (131); Vishal Joshi 4/59 (18 overs) |
| 170 (63 overs); Shitanshu Kotak 53 (123); Harbhajan Singh 4/60 (26 overs) | | 119 (40 overs); Mandeep Singh 33 (57); Vishal Joshi 5/43 (11 overs) |

Saurashtra won by 229 runs
Saurashtra Cricket Association Stadium, Rajkot
Umpires: Rob Bailey (Eng) and Chettithody Shamshuddin
Player of the match: Vishal Joshi (Sau)

- Saurashtra won the toss and elected to bat
- Saurashtra advance to the finals

16–20 Jan 2013
Scorecard

| Mumbai | v | Services (H) |
| 454/8d (152 overs); Ajit Agarkar 145 (259); Shadab Nazar 3/142 (44 overs) | | 240 (91.4 overs); Soumya Swain 74 (156); Dhawal Kulkarni 5/33 (21.4 overs) |

Match drawn
Mumbai advance on first innings lead
Palam A Ground, Delhi
Umpires: Adrian Holdstock (RSA) and Subroto Das

- Mumbai won the toss and elected to bat
- No play possible on Day 3 and Day 4 due to rain
- Mumbai advance to the finals

=== Final ===
26–30 Jan 2013
Scorecard

| Saurashtra | v | Mumbai (H) |
| 148 (75.3 overs); Aarpit Vasavada 55 (146); Dhawal Kulkarni 4/24 (21.3 overs) | | 355 (119 overs); Wasim Jaffer 132 (246); Kamlesh Makvana 3/49 (16 overs) |
| 82 (36.3 overs); Dharmendrasinh Jadeja 22 (35); Dhawal Kulkarni 5/32 (14.3 overs) |

Mumbai win by an innings and 125 runs
Wankhede Stadium, Mumbai
Umpires: Krishna Hariharan and C. K. Nandan
Player of the match: Wasim Jaffer (Mumbai)

- Mumbai won the toss and elected to field

== Statistics ==
=== Most runs ===
| Player | Team | Matches | Inns | Runs | Ave | HS | 100s | 50s |
|---|---|---|---|---|---|---|---|---|
| Jiwanjot Singh | Punjab | 10 | 17 | 995 | 66.33 | 213 | 5 | 2 |
| Muralidharen Gautam | Karnataka | 9 | 14 | 943 | 117.87 | 264* | 3 | 2 |
| Abhishek Nayar | Mumbai | 10 | 16 | 940 | 104.44 | 132 | 3 | 8 |
| Parthiv Patel | Gujarat | 8 | 13 | 895 | 68.84 | 162 | 3 | 6 |
| VA Jagadeesh | Kerala | 8 | 14 | 871 | 72.58 | 199* | 4 | 1 |

=== Most wickets ===
| Player | Team | Matches | Innings | Wickets | Ave. | BBI | BBM | 5/i | 10/m |
|---|---|---|---|---|---|---|---|---|---|
| Ishwar Pandey | Madhya Pradesh | 8 | 15 | 48 | 21.06 | 6/54 | 10/145 | 5 | 1 |
| Siddarth Kaul | Punjab | 9 | 17 | 44 | 23.79 | 6/63 | 8/81 | 2 | 0 |
| Suraj Yadav | Services | 10 | 15 | 43 | 21.90 | 7/71 | 9/106 | 2 | 0 |
| Shahbaz Nadeem | Jharkhand | 9 | 15 | 42 | 24.26 | 6/54 | 9/104 | 2 | 0 |
| Sandeep Sharma | Punjab | 9 | 16 | 41 | 19.41 | 7/25 | 10/82 | 3 | 1 |

== See also ==
- 2013 Irani Cup
