= Eurogrip Tyres =

Indian tyre manufacturer

- A bike fit with a TVS rear wheel
- Type: Public
- Traded as: NSE: TVSSRICHAK; BSE: 509243
- Industry: Tyres
- Founded: 1982; 44 years ago
- Headquarters: Madurai, Tamil Nadu
- Number of employees: 2,790 (2025)
- Website: www.eurogriptyres.com

Eurogrip Tyres, also known as TVS Tyres, is an Indian tyre brand owned by TVS Group. It was founded in 1982 and is based in Madurai, Tamil Nadu. It primarily manufactures tyres for two wheeler, three wheeler, and off-road vehicles.

== History ==
TVS Srichakra was incorporated in 1982 in Madurai under TVS Mobility Group, a subsidiary of TVS Group. It manufactured tyres under the brand "TVS Tyres" for two wheeler, three wheeler, and off-road vehicles. In 2018, the company rebranded itself as Eurogrip Tyres.

Eurogrip Tyres was the principal sponsor of IPL team Chennai Super Kings from 2022 to 2024.

== Products ==
The company has manufacturing facilities in Madurai, Tamil Nadu and Rudrapur, Uttarakhand. As of June 2025, their combined monthly production capacity was 30 lakh tyres. Its flagship tyre range includes Protorq Extreme, Roadhound, and Trailhound series. It supplies its tyres to the replacement market and original equipment manufacturers like Bajaj Auto and Royal Enfield, and its group firm, TVS Motor Company.

According to Fortune India, it holds a 25% market share in the country's two- and three-wheler tyre segment.

In 2018, its parent entered into a partnership with Michelin to produce the French brand's two-wheeler tyre models in India.

In 2019, it started operations in Milan, Italy to cater to European markets. Across its markets in 85 countries, Eurogrip Tyres sells over 400 products for two-wheelers alone.

== Finances ==
TVS Srichakra is publicly listed on the National Stock Exchange of India and Bombay Stock Exchange.

== Recognition ==
TVS Srichakra was part of the Fortune India 500 rankings from 2014 to 2020.

In 2025, its Protorq Extreme tyre model received the “Tyre of the Year” award at the Motoring World Awards.

== See also ==
- List of tyre companies
- TVS Motor Company
