= List of Chennai Super Kings cricketers =

The Chennai Super Kings (abbreviated as "CSK") is a franchise cricket team based in Chennai, Tamil Nadu. The team competes in the Indian Premier League (IPL) and was one of the eight franchises incorporated when the league was established in 2008. It is currently captained by Ruturaj Gaikwad and coached by Stephen Fleming.

The Super Kings is the joint-most successful IPL franchise, having won five IPL titles (along with Mumbai Indians). In the IPL, it has appeared in a 10 finals and qualified for the playoff stages 12 times, the most amongst the IPL teams. The franchise has also won the Champions League Twenty20 twice in 2010 and 2014. In January 2022, CSK became India's first unicorn sports enterprise. As of 2022, it was the second most valuable IPL franchise with a valuation of $1.15 billion.

== Players ==
Sorted by debut followed by alphabetically. Statistical information solely from the Indian Premier League (IPL).

List of players
General						Batting							Bowling								Fielding	
No.	Name	Debut	Last	Country	Matches	Innings	Runs	HS	Avg	SR	50s	100s	Innings	Overs	Wkts	BBI	Avg	ER	SR	5w	Ct	St
1	Mahendra Singh Dhoni	2008	2025	India	248	215	4865	84*	39.23	139.12	22	—	—	—	—	—	—	—	—	—	137	39
2	Jacob Oram	2008	2009	New Zealand	15	11	106	41*	15.14	100.95	—	—	11	31.3	8	3/32	35.25	8.95	23.6	—	8	—
3	Joginder Sharma	2008	2011	India	16	6	36	16*	9.00	120.00	—	—	15	42.4	12	2/27	34.90	9.82	21.3	—	5	—
4	Manpreet Gony	2008	2010	India	26	9	50	15*	12.50	138.88	—	—	26	85.0	23	3/34	30.73	8.31	22.1	—	5	—
5	Matthew Hayden	2008	2010	Australia	32	32	1107	93	36.90	137.51	8	—	—	—	—	—	—	—	—	—	11	—
6	Michael Hussey	2008	2015	Australia	50	49	1768	116*	42.09	123.63	13	1	—	—	—	—	—	—	—	—	23	—
7	Muttiah Muralitharan	2008	2010	Sri Lanka	40	6	9	4	2.25	69.23	—	—	40	156.0	40	3/11	24.85	6.37	23.4	—	11	—
8	Palani Amarnath	2008	2008	India	6	—	—	—	—	—	—	—	6	22.0	7	2/29	33.71	10.72	18.8	—	2	—
9	Parthiv Patel	2008	2010	India	26	26	516	57	21.50	102.78	3	—	—	—	—	—	—	—	—	—	9	2
10	Subramaniam Badrinath	2008	2013	India	95	67	1441	71*	30.65	118.89	11	—	—	—	—	—	—	—	—	—	16	—
11	Suresh Raina	2008	2021	India	176	171	4687	100*	32.32	136.88	33	1	59	129.2	24	2/0	38.90	7.22	32.3	—	98	—
12	Albie Morkel	2008	2013	South Africa	78	59	827	71	23.62	144.83	2	—	75	254.1	76	4/32	27.02	8.08	20.0	—	15	—
13	Makhaya Ntini	2008	2008	South Africa	9	2	11	11	11.00	61.11	—	—	9	35.0	7	4/21	34.57	6.91	30.0	—	1	—
14	Stephen Fleming	2008	2008	New Zealand	10	10	196	45	21.77	118.78	—	—	—	—	—	—	—	—	—	—	2	—
15	Vidyut Sivaramakrishnan	2008	2008	India	9	8	145	54	18.12	133.02	1	—	1	2.0	1	1/22	22.00	11.00	12.0	—	1	—
16	Srikkanth Anirudha	2008	2013	India	19	12	133	64	19.00	123.14	1	—	—	—	—	—	—	—	—	—	11	—
17	Chamara Kapugedera	2008	2008	Sri Lanka	5	3	16	8	5.33	69.56	—	—	3	2.5	0	—	—	17.29	—	—	4	—
18	Lakshmipathy Balaji	2008	2010	India	29	8	22	15	3.66	64.70	—	—	29	93.4	31	5/24	26.09	8.63	18.1	1	5	—
19	Abhinav Mukund	2008	2008	India	2	1	0	0	0.00	0.00	—	—	—	—	—	—	—	—	—	—	3	—
20	Andrew Flintoff	2009	2009	England	3	3	62	24	31.00	116.98	—	—	3	11.0	2	1/11	52.50	9.54	33.0	—	4	—
21	Ravichandran Ashwin	2009	2025	India	106	35	223	23	9.29	96.12	—	—	103	368.4	97	3/16	25.39	6.68	22.80	—	24	—
22	Thilan Thushara	2009	2010	Sri Lanka	6	4	12	8	6.00	66.66	—	—	6	22.3	8	2/16	20.12	7.15	16.8	—	3	—
23	Shadab Jakati	2009	2012	India	50	7	27	13	27.00	100.00	—	—	48	152.1	45	4/22	26.22	7.75	20.2	—	17	—
24	Sudeep Tyagi	2009	2010	India	14	3	3	3*	3.00	75.00	—	—	14	34.5	6	2/18	49.16	8.46	34.8	—	3	—
25	Murali Vijay	2009	2020	India	70	70	1708	127	25.87	125.12	7	2	—	—	—	—	—	—	—	—	33	—
26	George Bailey	2009	2010	Australia	4	3	63	30	21.00	95.45	—	—	—	—	—	—	—	—	—	—	—	—
27	Justin Kemp	2010	2010	South Africa	5	2	26	22	13.00	108.33	—	—	5	7.2	3	3/12	18.00	7.36	14.6	—	1	—
28	Thisara Perera	2010	2010	Sri Lanka	1	—	—	—	—	—	—	—	1	1.0	0	—	—	19.00	—	—	—	—
29	Arun Karthik	2010	2010	India	1	1	3	3*	—	60.00	—	—	—	—	—	—	—	—	—	—	—	—
30	Chandrasekar Ganapathy	2010	2010	India	1	1	0	0*	—	0.00	—	—	1	1.0	0	—	—	13.00	—	—	—	—
31	Doug Bollinger	2010	2012	Australia	27	4	21	16*	21.00	91.30	—	—	27	96.0	37	4/13	18.72	7.21	15.5	—	8	—
32	Scott Styris	2011	2011	New Zealand	2	1	5	5*	—	250.00	—	—	1	1.0	0	—	—	13.00	—	—	1	—
33	Suraj Randiv	2011	2011	Sri Lanka	8	1	2	2	2.00	50.00	—	—	8	29.0	6	2/24	37.15	7.68	29.0	—	2	—
34	Tim Southee	2011	2011	New Zealand	5	—	—	—	—	—	—	—	5	19.0	4	1/30	41.50	8.73	28.5	—	—	—
35	Nuwan Kulasekara	2011	2012	Sri Lanka	6	1	5	5*	—	166.66	—	—	5	17.0	5	2/10	24.00	7.05	20.4	—	4	—
36	Wriddhiman Saha	2011	2013	India	14	7	144	46*	28.80	108.27	—	—	—	—	—	—	—	—	—	—	2	—
37	Dwayne Bravo	2011	2022	West Indies	116	75	1004	68	25.10	137.15	2	—	113	376.1	140	4/42	22.47	8.36	16.1	—	59	—
38	Faf du Plessis	2012	2021	South Africa	92	86	2721	96	35.33	131.44	20	—	1	1.0	0	—	—	16.00	—	—	62	—
39	Ravindra Jadeja	2012	2025	India	186	139	2198	77*	28.55	136.10	5	—	173	530.2	143	5/16	28.33	7.64	22.25	1	91	—
40	Yo Mahesh	2012	2012	India	5	—	—	—	—	—	—	—	4	9.2	3	2/21	27.00	8.67	18.6	—	1	—
41	Ben Hilfenhaus	2012	2014	Australia	17	1	0	0*	—	0.00	—	—	17	62.0	22	3/27	21.77	7.72	16.9	—	1	—
42	Ankit Rajpoot	2013	2013	India	2	1	2	2*	—	33.33	—	—	2	4.0	1	1/25	35.00	8.75	24.0	—	—	—
43	Ben Laughlin	2013	2013	Australia	2	2	4	4*	4.00	44.44	—	—	2	7.0	1	1/25	71.00	10.14	42.0	—	—	—
44	Dirk Nannes	2013	2013	Australia	5	1	0	0*	—	0.00	—	—	5	19.5	4	2/17	39.50	7.96	29.7	—	3	—
45	Chris Morris	2013	2013	South Africa	16	6	14	7*	7.00	87.50	—	—	16	50.0	15	3/40	26.73	8.02	20.0	—	5	—
46	Mohit Sharma	2013	2019	India	48	10	29	21*	7.25	103.57	—	—	48	164.3	58	4/14	22.17	7.81	17.0	—	10	—
47	Jason Holder	2013	2013	West Indies	6	—	—	—	—	—	—	—	6	20.0	2	2/20	84.00	8.40	60.0	—	3	—
48	Ashish Nehra	2014	2015	India	20	4	1	1*	1.00	14.28	—	—	20	77.0	30	4/10	19.70	7.67	15.4	—	3	—
49	Brendon McCullum	2014	2015	New Zealand	28	28	841	100*	32.34	137.19	5	1	—	—	—	—	—	—	—	—	8	—
50	Dwayne Smith	2014	2015	West Indies	32	32	965	79	30.15	128.49	7	—	6	12.0	5	1/11	22.40	9.33	14.4	—	14	—
51	Pawan Negi	2014	2015	India	12	9	116	36	14.50	158.90	—	—	12	37.0	6	2/25	54.50	8.83	37.0	—	5	—
52	Ishwar Pandey	2014	2015	India	23	—	—	—	—	—	—	—	22	73.0	17	2/23	31.82	7.41	25.7	—	6	—
53	Mithun Manhas	2014	2014	India	12	5	35	13*	17.50	152.17	—	—	—	—	—	—	—	—	—	—	3	—
54	Samuel Badree	2014	2014	West Indies	4	—	—	—	—	—	—	—	4	14.0	2	1/19	48.50	6.92	42.0	—	—	—
55	Vijay Shankar	2014	2025	India	7	5	118	69*	39.33	129.67	1	—	1	1.0	0	—	—	19.00	—	—	2	—
56	David Hussey	2014	2014	Australia	5	4	116	50*	58.00	123.40	1	—	1	2.5	2	2/38	19.00	13.41	8.5	—	1	—
57	John Hastings	2014	2014	Australia	1	—	—	—	—	—	—	—	1	3.0	1	1/29	29.00	9.66	18.0	—	—	—
58	Ronit More	2015	2015	India	2	1	2	2*	—	100.00	—	—	2	5.5	1	1/31	59.00	10.11	35.0	—	1	—
59	Ambati Rayudu	2018	2023	India	90	80	1932	100*	29.72	129.31	8	1	—	—	—	—	—	—	—	—	19	—
60	Deepak Chahar	2018	2024	India	76	12	66	39	11.00	124.52	—	—	76	266.1	76	4/13	27.7	7.91	21.0	—	12	—
61	Harbhajan Singh	2018	2019	India	24	4	30	19	7.50	76.92	—	—	23	75.5	23	3/20	25.30	7.67	19.7	—	8	—
62	Imran Tahir	2018	2021	South Africa	27	3	15	13*	—	125.00	—	—	27	100.0	35	4/12	20.31	7.11	17.1	—	8	—
63	Kedar Jadhav	2018	2020	India	23	18	248	58	20.66	96.49	1	—	—	—	—	—	—	—	—	—	5	—
64	Mark Wood	2018	2018	England	1	1	1	1	1.00	33.33	—	—	1	4.0	0	—	—	12.25	—	—	1	—
65	Shane Watson	2018	2020	Australia	43	43	1252	117*	30.53	136.38	7	2	11	28.0	6	2/29	41.83	8.96	28.0	—	11	—
66	Sam Billings	2018	2019	England	11	9	108	56	12.00	131.70	1	—	—	—	—	—	—	—	—	—	6	—
67	Shardul Thakur	2018	2021	India	57	13	67	17	11.17	121.82	—	—	56	200.3	60	3/28	30.38	9.09	20.05	—	17	—
68	Karn Sharma	2018	2020	India	12	1	0	0*	—	0.00	—	—	11	31.2	10	2/13	28.70	9.15	18.8	—	3	—
69	KM Asif	2018	2021	India	3	—	—	—	—	—	—	—	3	8.1	4	2/43	23.25	11.38	12.2	—	—	—
70	Lungi Ngidi	2018	2021	South Africa	14	—	—	—	—	—	—	—	14	54.0	25	4/10	17.92	8.29	12.9	—	2	—
71	David Willey	2018	2018	England	3	—	—	—	—	—	—	—	3	10.0	2	1/24	47.50	9.50	30.0	—	2	—
72	Dhruv Shorey	2018	2019	India	2	2	13	8	6.50	76.47	—	—	—	—	—	—	—	—	—	—	—	—
73	Mitchell Santner	2019	2023	New Zealand	18	11	70	22	11.67	98.59	—	—	18	61.0	15	2/13	28.13	6.92	24.40	—	6	—
74	Scott Kuggeleijn	2019	2019	New Zealand	2	—	—	—	—	—	—	—	2	8.0	2	2/37	35.50	8.87	24.0	—	—	—
75	Piyush Chawla	2020	2020	India	7	—	—	—	—	—	—	—	7	21.0	6	2/33	31.83	9.09	21.0	—	—	—
76	Sam Curran	2020	2025	England	28	20	356	88	22.25	140.16	2	—	27	87.0	23	3/19	35.00	9.25	22.70	—	11	—
77	Ruturaj Gaikwad	2020	2026	India	71	70	2502	108*	40.35	137.47	20	2	—	—	—	—	—	—	—	—	39	—
78	Josh Hazlewood	2020	2021	Australia	12	—	—	—	—	—	—	—	12	45.0	12	3/24	29.75	7.93	22.5	—	1	—
79	Narayan Jagadeesan	2020	2022	India	7	4	73	39*	24.33	110.60	—	—	—	—	—	—	—	—	—	—	—	—
80	Monu Kumar	2020	2020	India	1	—	—	—	—	—	—	—	1	2.0	0	—	—	10.00	—	—	—	—
81	Matheesha Pathirana	2022	2025	Sri Lanka	32	—	—	—	—	—	—	—	32	117.0	47	4/28	21.62	8.68	14.94	—	9	—
82	Robin Uthappa	2021	2022	India	16	15	345	88	23.00	135.29	3	—	—	—	—	—	—	—	—	—	5	—
83	Adam Milne	2022	2022	New Zealand	1	—	—	—	—	—	—	—	1	2.3	0	—	—	7.60	—	—	—	—
84	Devon Conway	2022	2025	New Zealand	29	28	1080	92*	43.20	139.72	11	—	—	—	—	—	—	—	—	—	10	—
85	Shivam Dube	2022	2026	India	55	53	1460	95*	33.95	151.61	9	—	4	5.0	1	1/14	83.00	16.60	—	—	18	—
86	Tushar Deshpande	2022	2024	India	31	2	0	0*	—	0.00	—	—	31	111.5	39	4/27	26.95	9.40	17.21	—	5	—
87	Dwaine Pretorius	2022	2023	South Africa	7	5	44	22	11.00	157.14	—	—	7	25.0	6	2/30	39.66	9.52	25.0	—	3	—
88	Mukesh Choudhary	2022	2026	India	16	2	6	4	6.00	100.00	—	—	16	52.3	17	4/46	30.71	9.94	18.53	—	3	—
89	Chris Jordan	2022	2022	England	4	2	11	6*	11.00	137.50	—	—	4	2	2/23	67.50	10.51	38.5	—	4	—	
90	Maheesh Theekshana	2022	2024	Sri Lanka	27	2	7	7*	7.00	100.00	—	—	27	104.0	25	4/33	31.88	7.66	24.96	—	4	—
91	Simarjeet Singh	2022	2022	India	10	3	7	3*	7.00	87.50	—	—	10	30.0	9	3/26	28.78	8.63	20.00	—	3	—
92	Moeen Ali	2021	2023	England	48	40	853	93	23.69	136.26	3	—	35	83.1	25	4/26	23.40	7.03	19.96	—	18	—
93	Prashant Solanki	2022	2022	India	2	—	—	—	—	—	—	—	2	6.0	2	2/20	19.00	6.33	18.0	—	—	—
94	Ben Stokes	2023	2023	England	2	2	15	8	7.50	107.14	—	—	1	1.0	0	—	—	18.00	—	—	2	—
95	Rajvardhan Hangargekar	2023	2023	India	2	—	—	—	—	—	—	—	2	6.0	3	3/36	20.00	10.00	12.0	—	—	—
96	Ajinkya Rahane	2023	2024	India	27	23	568	71*	25.82	147.53	2	—	—	—	—	—	—	—	—	—	9	—
97	Sisanda Magala	2023	2023	South Africa	2	—	—	—	—	—	—	—	2	6.0	1	1/37	51.00	8.50	36.0	—	1	—
98	Akash Singh	2023	2023	India	6	—	—	—	—	—	—	—	6	19.0	5	2/40	37.60	9.89	22.8	—	1	—
99	Daryl Mitchell	2024	2024	New Zealand	13	13	318	63	28.91	142.60	—	—	2	6.0	1	1/18	18	11.67	36.00	—	—	—
100	Mustafizur Rahman	2024	2024	Bangladesh	9	—	—	—	—	—	—	—	9	34.2	14	4/29	22.71	9.26	14.71	—	1	—
101	Rachin Ravindra	2024	2025	New Zealand	18	18	413	65*	24.29	143.90	—	—	—	—	—	—	—	—	—	—	10	—
102	Sameer Rizvi	2024	2024	India	8	5	51	21	12.75	118.60	—	—	—	—	—	—	—	—	—	—	1	—
103	Richard Gleeson	2024	2024	England	2	1	2	2*	—	100.00	—	—	2	7.5	1	1/30	71.00	9.06	47.00	—	—	—
104	Khaleel Ahmed	2025	2026	India	14	2	1	1*	—	50.00	—	—	14	46.4	15	3/29	29.80	9.58	18.67	—	1	—
105	Nathan Ellis	2025	2025	Australia	1	—	—	—	—	—	—	—	1	4.0	1	1/38	38.00	9.50	24.00	—	—	—
106	Noor Ahmad	2025	2026	Afghanistan	14	6	7	2	1.75	41.18	—	—	14	50.0	24	4/18	17.00	8.16	12.50	—	2	—
107	Deepak Hooda	2025	2025	India	7	5	31	22	6.20	75.61	—	—	1	1.0	0	0/15	—	15.00	—	—	3	—
108	Rahul Tripathi	2025	2025	India	5	5	55	23	11.00	96.49	—	—	—	—	—	—	—	—	—	—	1	—
109	Jamie Overton	2025	2026	England	3	2	15	11*	—	214.29	—	—	3	6.0	0	0/24	—	—	—	—	—	—
110	Anshul Kamboj	2025	2026	India	8	5	14	5*	7.00	116.67	—	—	8	21.3	8	3/13	21.50	8.00	16.13	—	1	—
111	Shaik Rasheed	2025	2025	India	5	5	71	27	14.20	112.70	—	—	—	—	—	—	—	—	—	—	1	—
112	Ayush Mhatre	2025	2026	India	7	7	240	94	34.29	188.98	1	—	—	—	—	—	—	—	—	—	4	—
113	Dewald Brevis	2025	2026	South Africa	6	6	225	57	37.50	180.00	2	—	—	—	—	—	—	—	—	—	6	—
114	Urvil Patel	2025	2026	India	3	3	68	37	22.67	212.50	—	—	—	—	—	—	—	—	—	—	2	—
115	Matthew Short	2026	2026	Australia	—	—	—	—	—	—	—	—	—	—	—	—	—	—	—	—	—	—
116	Kartik Sharma	2026	2026	India	—	—	—	—	—	—	—	—	—	—	—	—	—	—	—	—	—	—
117	Sanju Samson	2026	2026	India	—	—	—	—	—	—	—	—	—	—	—	—	—	—	—	—	—	—
118	Matt Henry	2026	2026	New Zealand	—	—	—	—	—	—	—	—	—	—	—	—	—	—	—	—	—	—
119	Sarfaraz Khan	2026	2026	India	—	—	—	—	—	—	—	—	—	—	—	—	—	—	—	—	—	—
120	Prashant Veer	2026	2026	India	—	—	—	—	—	—	—	—	—	—	—	—	—	—	—	—	—	—
121	Rahul Chahar	2026	2026	India	—	—	—	—	—	—	—	—	—	—	—	—	—	—	—	—	—	—
122	Gurjapneet Singh	2026	2026	India	—	—	—	—	—	—	—	—	—	—	—	—	—	—	—	—	—	—
123	Akeal Hosein	2026	2026	West Indies	—	—	—	—	—	—	—	—	—	—	—	—	—	—	—	—	—	—
124	Ramakrishna Ghosh	2026	2026	India	—	—	—	—	—	—	—	—	—	—	—	—	—	—	—	—	—	—
125	Spencer Johnson	2026	2026	Australia	—	—	—	—	—	—	—	—	—	—	—	—	—	—	—	—	—	—

== Captains ==
Player	Nationality	From	To	Matches	Won	Lost	Tied	NR	Win%
MS Dhoni	India	2008	2025	244	145	96	1	0	59.42
Suresh Raina	India	2010	2019	6	2	3	1	0	33.33
Ravindra Jadeja	India	2022	2022	8	2	6	0	0	25.00
Ruturaj Gaikwad	India	2024	Present	33	14	19	0	0	42.42

Last updated: 1 Mar 2027; Source: ESPNcricinfo

- The success percentage excludes no results and counts ties as half a win.
