= Ishwar Pandey =

Indian cricketer

Ishwar Chand Pandey
Personal information
- Full name: Ishwar Chand Pandey
- Born: 15 August 1989 (age 37); Rewa, Madhya Pradesh, India
- Nickname: Sonu
- Height: 6 ft 2 in (188 cm)
- Batting: Right-handed
- Bowling: Right-arm medium-fast
- Role: Bowler

Domestic team information
- Years: Team
- 2009/10–2021/22: Madhya Pradesh
- 2013: Pune Warriors
- 2014–2015: Chennai Super Kings (squad no. 16)

Career statistics
Competition	FC	LA	T20
Matches	75	58	71
Runs scored	945	127	109
Batting average	13.50	4.53	6.81
100s/50s	0/1	0/0	0/0
Top score	63	20	19*
Balls bowled	14,094	2,851	1,464
Wickets	263	63	68
Bowling average	25.92	37.11	25.39
5 wickets in innings	13	0	0
10 wickets in match	3	0	0
Best bowling	8/84	4/44	4/20
Catches/stumpings	22/–	14/–	17/–
- Source: ESPNcricinfo, 4 April 2025

Ishwar Chand Pandey (born 15 August 1989) is an Indian former cricketer who played for Madhya Pradesh. He was a right-arm medium-fast bowler who was the leading wicket-taker of the 2012–13 Ranji Trophy. He played for India A and was selected in the Indian Test and ODI squads for the New Zealand tour of 2014. He was bought by the Chennai Super Kings in 2014 IPL auction for Rs 1.5 crores.Then he was bought by Rising Pune Supergiants in 2016 and 2017 edition of IPL. On 12 September 2022, he announced his retirement from international and first class cricket.

== Early life ==
Pandey was born in Rewa, Madhya Pradesh. His father is a retired junior officer of the Indian Army. He received training from the prestigious MRF Pace Academy in Chennai.

== Career ==
Pandey made his first-class debut for Madhya Pradesh against Goa in November 2010. He played three matches in that season's Ranji Trophy, taking 9 wickets at an average of 27. In the 2011/12 season of Ranji Trophy, Pandey picked 25 wickets from six games at an average of 29 and a best of 6/31. In the following Ranji season, Pandey topped the wicket-takers' list with 48 wickets from eight matches, averaging just over 21, with 5 five-wicket hauls and a ten-wicket haul. In a match against Bengal that season, Pandey single-handedly took Madhya Pradesh to an improbable win with figures of 5/87 and 5/58. Following this, Pandey was selected for the India A squad to play the touring England team, and the Rest of India squad against Mumbai for the 2013 Irani Cup. He was signed up by Pune Warriors India for the 2013 season of the Indian Premier League.

In August 2013, playing for India A, Pandey had figures of 4/46 and 3/25 in the first unofficial test at Rustenburg against South Africa A as India A registered an innings victory. In the second unofficial test which South Africa A won, he had figures of 3/67 and 1/16. He finished as the joint highest wicket-taker of the series. He was a regular member of CSK in IPL 2015.

In January 2016 he took a hat-trick in the Twenty20 match between Madhya Pradesh and Andhra in the 2015–16 Syed Mushtaq Ali Trophy.
