= List of Chennai Super Kings records =

Chennai based franchisee of the Indian Premier League

Chennai Super Kings (CSK) are an Indian franchise cricket team based in Chennai, Tamil Nadu which plays in the Indian Premier League (IPL). Founded in 2008 this team led by Dhoni. The team plays its home matches at the M. A. Chidambaram Stadium in Chennai.

After serving a two-year suspension from the IPL starting July 2015 2013 IPL betting case (along with Rajasthan Royals), the Super Kings returned to the league in 2018, winning the championship in the comeback season. The team is captained by Ruturaj Gaikwad and coached by Stephen Fleming.

The brand value of the Super Kings in 2018 was estimated at $95 million, making them one of the most valuable franchises in the IPL. in January 2022 CSK became the first sports Unicorn in India.

== Listing criteria ==
In general the top five are listed in each category (except when there is a tie for the last place among the five, when all the tied record holders are noted).

== Listing notation ==
Team notation

- (180–3) indicates that a team scored 180 runs for three wickets and the innings was closed, either due to a successful run chase or if no playing time remained
- (200) indicates that a team scored 200 runs and was all out

=== Team Performance ===
Year	Total	Wins	Losses	No result	Tied and won	Tied and lost	Win %	Position	Summary
2008	16	9	7	0	0	0	56.25%	2nd	Runners-up
2009	15	8	6	1	0	0	53.33%	4th	3rd Runners-up
2010	16	9	7	0	0	0	56.25%	1st	Champions
2011	16	11	5	0	0	0	68.75%	1st	Champions
2012	19	10	8	1	0	0	52.63%	2nd	Runners-up
2013	18	12	6	0	0	0	66.66%	2nd	Runners-up
2014	16	10	6	0	0	0	62.50%	3rd	2nd Runners-up
2015	17	10	7	0	0	0	58.82%	2nd	Runners-up
2018	16	11	5	0	0	0	68.75%	1st	Champions
2019	17	10	7	0	0	0	58.82%	2nd	Runners-up
2020	14	6	8	0	0	0	42.85%	7th	League Stage
2021	16	11	5	0	0	0	68.75%	1st	Champions
2022	14	4	10	0	0	0	28.57%	9th	League Stage
2023	16	10	5	1	0	0	62.50%	1st	Champions
2024	14	7	7	0	0	0	50.00%	5th	League Stage
2025	14	5	9	0	0	0	33.33%	10th	League Stage
Total	241	139	99	3	0	0	57.67	5 Times Champion	
Last Updated: 23 June 2025

=== Team wins, losses and draws ===
Opponent	Span	Matches	Won	Lost	No Result	Tied and won	Tied and lost	Win %
DC^{†}	2008-2012	10	6	4	0	0	0	60.00
DC	2008-2026	30	18	12	0	0	0	60.00
KTK^{†}	2011	2	1	1	0	0	0	50.00
KKR	2008-2026	31	20	11	0	0	0	64.51
MI	2008-2026	41	20	21	0	0	0	48.78
PWI^{†}	2011–2013	6	4	2	0	0	0	66.66
PBKS	2008–2025	33	17	15	0	0	1	51.51
RR	2008–2015, 2018–2025	32	16	16	0	0	0	50.00
RCB	2008–2025	36	21	13	1	0	0	58.34
SRH	2013–2025	22	15	7	0	0	0	68.18
LSG	2022–2025	4	2	1	1	0	0	50.00
GT	2022–2025	8	4	4	0	0	0	50.00
Last updated: 23 March 2025 Note: Tie+W and Tie+L indicates matches tied and then won or lost by super over; The result percentage excludes no results and counts ties (irrespective of a tiebreaker) as half a win; The total matches does not include matches played for Champions League T20; †No longer exists

== Result records ==
=== Greatest win margin (by runs) ===
Margin	Opposition	Venue	Date
103 runs	MI	Wankhede Stadium, Mumbai	23 April 2026
97 runs	PBKS	M. A. Chidambaram Stadium, Chennai	25 April 2015
93 runs	DD	Sheikh Zayed Stadium, Abu Dhabi, UAE	21 April 2014
92 runs	RCB	St. George's Oval, Port Elizabeth, South Africa	20 April 2009
91 runs	DD	DY Patil Stadium, Navi Mumbai, India	8 May 2022
Last Updated: 23 April 2026

=== Greatest win margin (by balls remaining) ===
Balls remaining	Margin	Opposition	Venue	Date
39	9 wickets	KKR	M. A. Chidambaram Stadium, Chennai, India	13 April 2010
31	9 wickets	PBKS	Wankhede Stadium, Mumbai, India	31 May 2008
28	9 wickets	DD	M. A. Chidambaram Stadium, Chennai, India	12 May 2012
26	6 wickets	PBKS	Wankhede Stadium, Mumbai, India	16 April 2021
20	6 wickets	MI	Wankhede Stadium, Mumbai, India	17 April 2015
Last Updated: 16 April 2021

=== Greatest win margins (by wickets) ===
Margin	Opposition	Venue	Date
10 wickets	PBKS	Punjab Cricket Association Stadium, Mohali, India	10 April 2013
10 wickets	PBKS	Dubai International Stadium, Dubai, UAE	4 October 2020
9 wickets	KKR	M. A. Chidambaram Stadium, Chennai, India	26 April 2008
9 wickets	PBKS	Wankhede Stadium, Mumbai, India	31 May 2008
9 wickets	KKR	M. A. Chidambaram Stadium, Chennai, India	13 April 2010
9 wickets	DD	M. A. Chidambaram Stadium, Chennai, India	12 May 2012
9 wickets	PBKS	Sheikh Zayed Stadium, Abu Dhabi, UAE	1 November 2020
Last Updated: 2 November 2020

=== Narrowest win margin (by runs) ===
Margin	Opposition	Venue	Date
1 run	DD	M. A. Chidambaram Stadium, Chennai, India	9 April 2015
2 runs	KKR	M. A. Chidambaram Stadium, Chennai, India	8 April 2011
2 runs	KKR	M. A. Chidambaram Stadium, Chennai, India	28 April 2015
3 runs	KKR	Eden Gardens, Kolkata, India	18 May 2008
4 runs	SRH	Rajiv Gandhi International Cricket Stadium, Hyderabad, India	22 April 2018
Last Updated: 1 October 2020

=== Narrowest win margin (by balls remaining) ===
Balls remaining	Margin	Opposition	Venue	Date
0 ball	4 wickets	DD	Arun Jaitley Stadium, Delhi, India	8 May 2008
0 ball	5 wickets	RCB	M. A. Chidambaram Stadium, Chennai, India	12 April 2012
0 ball	7 wickets	RR	M. A. Chidambaram Stadium, Chennai, India	21 April 2012
0 ball	5 wickets	KKR	Eden Gardens, Kolkata, India	14 May 2012
0 ball	4 wickets	RR	Sawai Mansingh Stadium, Jaipur, India	11 April 2019
0 ball	6 wickets	KKR	Dubai International Stadium, Dubai, UAE	29 October 2020
0 ball	2 wickets	KKR	Sheikh Zayed Cricket Stadium, Abu Dhabi, UAE	26 September 2021
0 ball	3 wickets	MI	DY Patil Stadium, Navi Mumbai, India	21 April 2022
0 ball	5 wickets	GT	Narendra Modi Stadium, Ahmedabad, India	30 May 2023
Last Updated: 30 May 2023

=== Narrowest win margins (by wickets) ===
Margin	Opposition	Venue	Date
1 wicket	MI	Wankhede Stadium, Mumbai, India	7 April 2018
2 wickets	SRH	Wankhede Stadium, Mumbai, India	22 May 2018
2 wickets	KKR	Zayed Cricket Stadium, Abu Dhabi, UAE	26 September 2021
3 wickets	RCB	JSCA International Stadium Complex, Ranchi, India	22 May 2015
4 wickets	DD	Arun Jaitley Stadium, Delhi, India	8 May 2008
4 wickets	RR	Sawai Mansingh Stadium, Jaipur, India	10 May 2012
4 wickets	RCB	M. A. Chidambaram Stadium, Chennai, India	13 April 2013
4 wickets	KKR	Eden Gardens, Kolkata, India	20 April 2013
4 wickets	MI	Wankhede Stadium, Mumbai, India	10 May 2014
4 wickets	RR	Sawai Mansingh Stadium, Jaipur, India	11 April 2019
4 wickets	DD	Dubai International Cricket Stadium, Dubai, UAE	10 October 2021
4 wickets	MI	M. A. Chidambaram Stadium, Chennai, India	23 March 2025
Last Updated: 23 March 2025

=== Tied Matches ===
Team 1	Team 2	Venue	Date
CSK	PBKS	M. A. Chidambaram Stadium, Chennai, India	21 March 2010
Last Updated: 21 September 2020

=== Greatest loss margin (by runs) ===
Margin	Opposition	Venue	Date
60 runs	MI	Wankhede Stadium, Mumbai, India	5 May 2013
50 runs	RCB	M.A. Chidambaram Stadium, Chenai, India	28 March 2025
46 runs	MI	M.A. Chidambaram Stadium, Chenai, India	26 April 2019
44 runs	PBKS	Barabati Stadium, Cuttack, India	7 May 2014
44 runs	DD	Dubai International Stadium, Dubai, UAE	25 September 2020
Last Updated: 3 April 2022

=== Greatest loss margin (by balls remaining) ===
Balls remaining	Margin	Opposition	Venue	Date
46	10 wickets	MI	Sharjah Cricket Stadium, Sharjah, UAE	23 Oct 2020
42	6 wickets	PBKS	Dubai International Cricket Stadium, Dubai, UAE	7 October 2021
40	8 wickets	DD	Arun Jaitley Stadium, Delhi, India	10 April 2012
37	9 wickets	MI	Wankhede Stadium, Mumbai, India	14 May 2008
34	8 wickets	RR	Sawai Mansingh Stadium, Jaipur, India	4 May 2008
Last Updated: 7 October 2021

=== Greatest loss margins (by wickets) ===
Margin	Opposition	Venue	Date
10 wickets	MI	Sharjah Cricket Stadium, Sharjah, UAE	23 Oct 2020
9 wickets	MI	Wankhede Stadium, Mumbai, India	14 May 2008
8 wickets	DD	M. A. Chidambaram Stadium, Chennai, India	2 May 2008
8 wickets	RR	Sawai Mansingh Stadium, Jaipur, India	4 May 2008
8 wickets	RCB	M. Chinnaswamy Stadium, Bengaluru, India	22 May 2011
8 wickets	MI	M. A. Chidambaram Stadium, Chennai, India	4 April 2012
8 wickets	DD	Arun Jaitley Stadium, Delhi, India	10 April 2012
8 wickets	KKR	Eden Gardens, Kolkata, India	20 May 2014
8 wickets	RR	Sardar Patel Stadium, Ahmedabad, India	19 April 2015
8 wickets	MI	Maharashtra Cricket Association Stadium, Pune, India	28 April 2018
8 wickets	SRH	DY Patil Stadium, Navi Mumbai, India	9 April 2022
Last Updated: 9 April 2022

=== Narrowest loss margin (by runs) ===
Margin	Opposition	Venue	Date
1 run	RCB	M. Chinnaswamy Stadium, Bengaluru, India	21 April 2019
1 run	MI	Rajiv Gandhi International Cricket Stadium, Hyderabad, India	12 May 2019
3 runs	RR	M. A. Chidambaram Stadium, Chennai, India	12 April 2023
4 runs	PBKS	Punjab Cricket Association Stadium, Mohali, India	15 April 2018
7 runs	PBKS	M. A. Chidambaram Stadium, Chennai, India	28 April 2012
7 runs	SRH	Dubai International Stadium, Dubai, UAE	2 October 2020
Last Updated: 12 April 2023

=== Narrowest loss margin (by balls remaining) ===
Balls remaining	Margin	Opposition	Venue	Date
0 balls	3 wickets	RR	DY Patil Stadium, Mumbai, India	1 June 2008
0 balls	7 wickets	KKR	Centurion Park, Centurion, South Africa	18 May 2009
0 balls	2 wickets	MI	Wankhede Stadium, Mumbai, India	6 May 2012
0 balls	4 wickets	MI	Arun Jaitley Stadium, Delhi, India	1 May 2021
0 balls	4 wickets	PBKS	M. A. Chidambaram Stadium, Chennai, India	30 April 2023
Last Updated: 30 April 2023

=== Narrowest loss margins (by wickets) ===
Margin	Opposition	Venue	Date
2 wickets	RCB	Kingsmead, Durban, South Africa	14 May 2009
2 wickets	MI	Wankhede Stadium, Mumbai, India	6 May 2012
3 wickets	RR	DY Patil Stadium, Navi Mumbai, India	1 June 2008
3 wickets	DD	Dubai International Cricket Stadium, Dubai, India	4 October 2021
3 wickets	GT	Maharashtra Cricket Association Stadium, Pune, India	17 April 2022
Last Updated: 17 April 2022

== Team scoring records ==
=== Highest Totals ===
Score	Opposition	Venue	Date
246/5	RR	M. A. Chidambaram Stadium, Chennai, India	14 May 2010
240/5	PBKS	I. S. Bindra Stadium, Mohali, India	19 April 2008
235/4	KKR	Eden Gardens, Kolkata, India	23 April 2023
230/5	GT	Narendra Modi Stadium, Ahmedabad, India	25 May 2025
223/3	SRH	Rajiv Gandhi International Cricket Stadium, Hyderabad, India	8 May 2013
223/3	DC	Arun Jaitley Cricket Stadium, Delhi, India	20 May 2023
Last updated: 20 May 2023

=== Lowest Totals ===
Score	Opposition	Venue	Date
79	MI	Wankhede Stadium, Mumbai, India	5 May 2013
97	MI	Wankhede Stadium, Mumbai, India	12 May 2022
103/9	KKR	M. A. Chidambaram Stadium, Chennai, India	11 April 2025
109	RR	Sawai Mansingh Stadium, Jaipur, India	4 May 2008
109	MI	M. A. Chidambaram Stadium, Chennai, India	26 April 2019
Last updated: 12 April 2025

=== Highest Totals Conceded ===
Score	Opposition	Venue	Date
250/3	RCB	M. Chinnaswamy Stadium, Bengaluru, India	5 April 2026
231/4	PBKS	Barabati Stadium, Cuttack, India	7 May 2014
231/3	GT	Narendra Modi Stadium, Ahmedabad, India	10 May 2024
226/6	PBKS	Wankhede Stadium, Mumbai, India	30 May 2014
223/5	RR	M. A. Chidambaram Stadium, Chennai, India	3 April 2010
Last updated: 5 April 2026

=== Lowest Totals Conceded ===
Score	Opposition	Venue	Date
70	RCB	M. A. Chidambaram Stadium, Chennai, India	23 March 2019
83	DD	Arun Jaitley Cricket Stadium, Delhi, India	18 April 2013
84	DD	Sheikh Zayed Cricket Stadium, Abu Dhabi, UAE	21 April 2014
87	RCB	St George's Park Cricket Ground, Gqeberha, South Africa	20 April 2009
92/8	PBKS	Kingsmead Cricket Ground, Durban, South Africa	20 May 2009
Last updated: 1 October 2020

=== Highest match aggregate ===
Aggregate	Team 1	Team 2	Venue	Date
469/10	CSK (246/5)	RR (223/5)	M. A. Chidambaram Stadium, Chennai, India	3 April 2010
447/9	CSK (240/5)	KXIP (207/4)	I. S. Bindra Stadium, Mohali, India	19 April 2008
444/14	CSK (226/6)	RCB (218/8)	M. Chinnaswamy Stadium, Bengaluru, India	17 April 2023
437/10	CSK (218/4)	MI (219/6)	Arun Jaitley Cricket Stadium, Delhi, India	1 May 2021
428/13	PBKS (226/6)	CSK (202/7)	Wankhede Stadium, Mumbai, India	30 May 2014
Last updated: 1 May 2021

=== Lowest match aggregate ===
Aggregate	Team 1	Team 2	Venue	Date
141/13	RCB (70)	CSK (71/3)	M. A. Chidambaram Stadium, Chennai, India	23 March 2019
175/6	CSK (114/4)	KKR (61/2)	Eden Gardens, Kolkata, India	7 May 2011
188/8	RCB (106/2)	CSK (82/6)	M. Chinnaswamy Stadium, Bengaluru, India	18 May 2013
200/15	MI (103/5)	CSK (97)	Wankhede Stadium, Mumbai, India	12 May 2022
204/5	KKR (149/5)	CSK (55/0)	Eden Gardens, Kolkata, India	18 May 2008
Last updated: 12 May 2022

== Individual Records (Batting) ==
=== Most runs ===
Rank	Runs	Player	Matches	Innings	Period
1	4,865	MS Dhoni†	248	215	2008–2025
2	4,687	Suresh Raina	176	171	2008–2021
3	2,839	Ruturaj Gaikwad	85	84	2020–2026
4	2,721	Faf du Plessis	92	86	2012–2021
5	2,198	Ravindra Jadeja	186	139	2012–2025
Last Updated:23 May 2026

=== Fastest runs getter ===
Runs	Batsman	Innings	Record Date
1,000	Devon Conway	24	8 April 2025
2,000	Ruturaj Gaikwad	57	14 April 2024
3,000	Suresh Raina	103	7 March 2014
4,000	Suresh Raina	151	10 May 2019

=== Highest individual score ===
Rank	Runs	Player	Opposition	Venue	Date
1	127	Murali Vijay	RR	M. A. Chidambaram Stadium, Chennai, India	3 April 2010
2	117*	Shane Watson	SRH	Wankhede Stadium, Mumbai, India	27 May 2018
3	116*	Michael Hussey	PBKS	I. S. Bindra Stadium, Mohali, India	19 April 2008
4	115*	Sanju Samson	DC	M. A. Chidambaram Stadium, Chennai, India	11 April 2026
5	113	Murali Vijay	DC	M. A. Chidambaram Stadium, Chennai, India	25 May 2012
	Last Updated: 11 April 2026				

=== Highest career average ===
Rank	Average	Player	Innings	Not out	Runs	Period
1	53.75	Sanju Samson	11	3	430	2026
2	43.20	Devon Conway	28	3	1080	2022–2025
3	42.09	Michael Hussey	49	7	1768	2008–2015
4	39.23	MS Dhoni	215	91	4865	2008–2025
5	38.36	Ruturaj Gaikwad	84	10	2,839	2020–2026
Qualification: 10 innings. Last Updated: 23 May 2026

=== Highest strike rates ===
Rank	Strike rate	Player	Runs	Balls	Period
1	151.60	Shivam Dube	1460	963	2022–2025
2	144.83	Albie Morkel	827	571	2008–2013
3	139.71	Devon Conway	1080	773	2022–2025
4	139.11	MS Dhoni	4865	3497	2008–2025
5	137.51	ML Hayden	1107	805	2008–2010
Qualification= 500 balls faced. Last Updated: 28 February 2026

=== Most 50+ scores ===
Rank	50+ scores	Player	Innings	Period
1	34	Suresh Raina	171	2008–2021
2	24	Ruturaj Gaikwad	84	2020–2026
3	22	MS Dhoni	215	2008-2025
4	20	Faf du Plessis	86	2012–2021
5	14	MEK Hussey	49	2008–2015
Last Updated: 2 August 2026

=== Most centuries ===
Rank	Centuries	Player	Innings	Period
1	2	Sanju Samson	14	2026
1	2	Shane Watson	43	2018–2020
1	2	Ruturaj Gaikwad	84	2020–2026
1	2	M Vijay	70	2009–2020
4	1	BB McCullum	28	2014–2015
4	1	MEK Hussey	49	2008–2015
Last Updated: 2 August 2026

=== Most Sixes ===
Rank	Sixes	Player	Innings	Period
1	234	MS Dhoni	215	2008–2025
2	180	Suresh Raina	171	2008–2021
3	136	Shivam Dube	87	2022–2026
4	107	Ruturaj Gaikwad	84	2020–2026
5	94	Ambati Rayudu	80	2018–2023
Last Updated: 2 August 2026

=== Most Fours ===
Rank	Fours	Player	Innings	Period
1	425	Suresh Raina	171	2008–2021
2	342	MS Dhoni†	215	2008–2025
3	260	Ruturaj Gaikwad	84	2020–2026
4	247	Faf du Plessis	86	2012–2021
5	181	MEK Hussey	49	2008–2015
Last Updated: 2 August 2026

=== Highest strike rates in an innings ===
Rank	Strike rate	Player	Runs	Balls Faced	Opposition	Venue	Date
2	400.00	Albie Morkel	28	7	RCB	M. A. Chidambaram Stadium, Chennai, India	12 April 2012
3	348.00	Suresh Raina	87	25	Kings XI	Wankhede Stadium, Mumbai, India	30 May 2014
4	311.11	MS Dhoni	28*	9	LSG	BRSABV Ekana Cricket Stadium, Lucknow, India	19 April 2024
5	282.30	Urvil Patel	65	23	LSG	M. A. Chidambaram Stadium, Chennai	10 May 2026
Qualification: Minimum 25 runs. Last Updated: 10 May 2026.

=== Most sixes in an innings ===
Rank	Sixes	Player	Opposition	Venue	Date
1	11	Murali Vijay	RR	M. A. Chidambaram Stadium, Chennai, India	3 April 2010
2	9	MEK Hussey	Kings XI	I. S. Bindra Stadium, Mohali, India	19 April 2008
2	9	Brendon McCullum	SRH	M. A. Chidambaram Stadium, Chennai, India	11 April 2015
2	9	Robin Uthappa	RCB	DY Patil Stadium, Mumbai, India	12 April 2022
2	9	Ruturaj Gaikwad	GT	Narendra Modi Stadium, Ahmedabad, India	31 March 2023
Last Updated: 28 February 2026

=== Most fours in an innings ===
Rank	Fours	Player	Opposition	Venue	Date
1	16	Devon Conway	PBKS	M.A. Chidambaram Stadium, Chennai, India	30 April 2023
2	15	M Vijay	DD	M.A. Chidambaram Stadium, Chennai, India	25 May 2012
3	13	MEK Hussey	RR	M.A. Chidambaram Stadium, Chennai, India	22 April 2013
3	13	MM Ali	RR	Brabourne Stadium, Mumbai, India	20 May 2022
5	12	ML Hayden	MI	M.A. Chidambaram Stadium, Chennai, India	23 April 2008
5	12	Suresh Raina	Kings XI	Wankhede Stadium, Mumbai, India	30 May 2014
5	12	Ruturaj Gaikwad	SRH	Arun Jaitley Stadium, Delhi, India	28 April 2021
5	12	Devon Conway	SRH	M.A. Chidambaram Stadium, Chennai, India	21 April 2023
5	12	Ruturaj Gaikwad	LSG	M.A. Chidambaram Stadium, Chennai, India	23 April 2024
Last Updated: 28 February 2026

=== Most runs in a season ===
Rank	Runs	Player	Matches	Innings	Season
1	733	MEK Hussey	17	17	2013
2	672	Devon Conway	16	15	2023
3	635	Ruturaj Gaikwad	16	16	2021
4	633	Faf du Plessis	16	16	2021
5	602	Ambati Rayudu	16	16	2018
Last Updated: 28 February 2026

=== Most Ducks ===
Rank	Ducks	Player	Matches	Innings	Period
1	8	Suresh Raina	176	171	2008–2021
2	7	Ruturaj Gaikwad	85	84	2020–2026
3	6	S. Badrinath	95	67	2008–2013
4	6	Ravindra Jadeja	186	139	2012–2025
5	6	MS Dhoni	248	215	2008–2025
Last Updated: 2 August 2026

== Individual Records (Bowling) ==
=== Most career wickets ===
Rank	Wickets	Player	Matches	Innings	Period
1	143	Ravindra Jadeja†	186	173	2012–2025
2	140	Dwayne Bravo	116	113	2011–2022
3	97	Ravichandran Ashwin	106	103	2009–2025
4	76	Albie Morkel	78	75	2008–2013
4	76	Deepak Chahar†	76	76	2018–2024
Last Updated: 1 June 2025

=== Best figures in an innings ===
Rank	Figures	Player	Opposition	Venue	Date
1	5/16	Ravindra Jadeja	DC	Dr. Y.S. Rajasekhara Reddy ACA-VDCA Cricket Stadium, Visakhapatnam, India	7 April 2012
2	5/24	Lakshmipathy Balaji	PBKS	M. A. Chidambaram Stadium, Chennai, India	10 May 2008
3	4/10	Ashish Nehra	RCB	M. Chinnaswamy Stadium, Bengaluru, India	22 April 2015
3	4/10	Lungi Ngidi	PBKS	Maharashtra Cricket Association Stadium, Pune, India	20 May 2018
5	4/11	Ravindra Jadeja	RR	M. A. Chidambaram Stadium, Chennai, India	10 May 2015
Last Updated: 1 October 2020

=== Best career average ===
Rank	Average	Player	Wickets	Runs	Balls	Period
1	17.64	Anshul Kamboj	25	441	319	2025-2026
2	17.92	Lungi Ngidi	25	448	324	2018–2021
3	18.72	Doug Bollinger	37	693	576	2010–2012
4	19.70	Ashish Nehra	30	591	462	2014–2015
5	20.31	Imran Tahir	35	711	600	2018–2021
Qualification: 250 balls. Last Updated: 2 May 2026

=== Best career economy rate ===
Rank	Economy rate	Player	Wickets	Runs	Balls	Period
1	6.37	Muttiah Muralitharan	40	994	936	2008–2010
2	6.68	Ravichandran Ashwin	97	2,463	2,212	2009–2025
3	6.91	Mitchell Santner	15	422	366	2019–2024
4	7.03	Moeen Ali	25	585	499	2021–2024
5	7.11	Imran Tahir	35	711	600	2018–2021
Qualification: 250 balls. Last Updated: 1 June 2025

=== Best career strike rate ===
Rank	Strike rate	Player	Wickets	Runs	Balls	Period
2	12.96	Lungi Ngidi	25	448	324	2018–2021
1	14.86	Anshul Kamboj	29	702	431	2025-2026
3	14.93	Matheesha Pathirana	47	1016	702	2022-2025
5	15.40	Ashish Nehra	30	591	462	2014–2015
4	15.56	Doug Bollinger	37	693	576	2010-2012
Qualification: 250 balls. Last Updated: 23 May 2026

=== Most four-wickets (& over) hauls in an innings ===
Rank	Four-wicket hauls	Player	Matches	Balls	Wickets	Period
1	4	Ravindra Jadeja	124	1,989	93	2012–2021
2	2	Noor Ahmad	14	300	24	2025-2026
2	2	Imran Tahir	27	600	35	2018–2021
2	2	Lakshmipathy Balaji	29	562	31	2008–2010
2	2	Shadab Jakati	50	913	45	2009–2012
2	2	Deepak Chahar	51	1,096	54	2018–2021
Last Updated: 1 June 2025

=== Best economy rates in an inning ===
Rank	Economy	Player	Overs	Runs	Wickets	Opposition	Venue	Date
1	1.50	Ravichandran Ashwin	2	3	2	DD	Sheikh Zayed Stadium, Abu Dhabi, UAE	21 April 2014
2	2.00	Muttiah Muralitharan	4	8	2	PBKS	Kingsmead, Durban, South Africa	20 May 2009
2	2.00	Ben Hilfenhaus	4	8	2	RR	Sawai Mansingh Stadium, Jaipur, India	10 May 2012
4	2.25	Imran Tahir	4	9	3	RCB	M. A. Chidambaram Stadium, Chennai, India	23 March 2019
5	2.33	Moeen Ali	3	7	3	RR	Wankhede Stadium, Mumbai, India	19 April 2021
Qualification: 12 balls bowled. Last Updated: 19 April 2021

=== Best strike rates in an inning ===
Rank	Strike rate	Player	Balls	Runs	Wickets	Opposition	Venue	Date
1	1.5	Suresh Raina	3	0	2	RR	Sawai Mansingh Stadium, Jaipur, India	9 May 2011
2	4.5	Karn Sharma	9	13	2	RR	Maharashtra Cricket Association Stadium, Pune, India	20 April 2018
3	4.8	Lakshmipathy Balaji	24	24	5	PBKS	M. A. Chidambaram Stadium, Chennai, India	10 May 2008
3	4.8	Ravindra Jadeja	24	16	3	RCB	M. Chinnaswamy Stadium, Bengaluru, India	30 April 2019
5	5.0	Jacob Oram	10	12	2	RCB	Kingsmead, Durban, South Africa	14 May 2009
5	5.0	Imran Tahir	20	12	4	DD	M. A. Chidambaram Stadium, Chennai, India	1 May 2019
Qualification: Minimum 2 wickets. Last Updated: 1 October 2020.

=== Most runs conceded in a match ===
Rank	Figures	Player	Overs	Opposition	Venue	Date
1	0/65	Khaleel Ahmed	3	RCB	M. Chinnaswamy Stadium, India	3 May 2025
2	0/62	Lungi Ngidi	4	MI	Arun Jaitley Stadium, Delhi, India	1 May 2021
3	2/61	Shardul Thakur	4	RCB	M. Chinnaswamy Stadium, India	18 May 2024
4	0/60	Simarjeet Singh	4	GT	Narendra Modi Stadium, India	10 May 2024
5	0/58	Mohit Sharma	4	SRH	Rajiv Gandhi International Cricket Stadium, Hyderabad, India	2 May 2015
5	1/58	Sam Curran	4	KKR	Wankhede Stadium, Mumbai, India	21 April 2021
Last updated: 1 June 2025

=== Most wickets in a series ===
Rank	Wickets	Player	Matches	Series
1	32	Dwayne Bravo	18	2013 Indian Premier League
2	26	Dwayne Bravo	17	2015 Indian Premier League
2	26	Imran Tahir	17	2019 Indian Premier League
4	24	Noor Ahmad	14	2025 Indian Premier League
5	23	Mohit Sharma	16	2014 Indian Premier League
Last Updated: 1 June 2025

=== Hat-trick ===
S. No	Bowler	Against	Wickets	Venue	Date	Ref.
1	Lakshmipathy Balaji	PBKS	Irfan Pathan (c Suresh Raina); Piyush Chawla (c Chamara Kapugedera); VRV Singh (c MS Dhoni)	M. A. Chidambaram Stadium, Chennai, India	10 May 2008	
2	Makhaya Ntini	KKR	Sourav Ganguly (b); Debabrata Das (b); David Hussey (b)	Eden Gardens, Kolkata, India	18 May 2008	
Last Updated: 16 September 2020

== Individual Records (Wicket-keeping) ==
=== Most career dismissals ===
Rank	Dismissals	Player	Matches	Innings	Period
1	158	MS Dhoni	222	215	2008–2024
2	7	Parthiv Patel	26	9	2008–2010
3	1	Sanju Samson	6	6	2026
3	1	Sam Billings	11	1	2018–2019
3	1	Ambati Rayudu	90	1	2018–2023
Last updated: 26 March 2024

=== Most career catches ===
Rank	Catches	Player	Matches	Innings	Period
1	123	MS Dhoni	222	215	2008–2024
2	5	Parthiv Patel	26	9	2008–2010
3	1	Sanju Samson	6	6	2026
3	1	Sam Billings	11	1	2018–2019
3	1	Ambati Rayudu	90	1	2018–2023
Last updated: 26 March 2024

=== Most career stumpings ===
Rank	Stumpings	Player	Matches	Innings	Period
1	35	MS Dhoni	222	215	2008–2024
2	2	Parthiv Patel	26	9	2008–2010
Last updated: 26 March 2024

=== Most dismissals in an innings ===
Rank	Dismissals	Player	Opposition	Venue	Date
1	4	MS Dhoni	RCB	M. A. Chidambaram Stadium, Chennai, India	13 April 2013
1	4	MS Dhoni	KKR	Sheikh Zayed Stadium, Abu Dhabi, UAE	8 October 2020
3	3	Parthiv Patel	PBKS	Wankhede Stadium, Mumbai, India	31 May 2008
3	3	MS Dhoni	KKR	M. A. Chidambaram Stadium, Chennai, India	13 April 2010
3	3	MS Dhoni	KKR	M. A. Chidambaram Stadium, Chennai, India	8 April 2011
3	3	MS Dhoni	PBKS	Himachal Pradesh Cricket Association Stadium, Dharamsala, India	17 May 2012
3	3	MS Dhoni	MI	M. Chinnaswamy Stadium, Bengaluru	23 May 2012
3	3	MS Dhoni	DD	M. A. Chidambaram Stadium, Chennai, India	14 May 2013
3	3	MS Dhoni	PBKS	Punjab Cricket Association Stadium, Mohali, India	16 May 2015
3	3	MS Dhoni	PBKS	Maharashtra Cricket Association Stadium, Pune, India	20 May 2018
3	3	MS Dhoni	DD	M. A. Chidambaram Stadium, Chennai, India	1 May 2019
3	3	MS Dhoni	KKR	Wankhede Stadium, Mumbai, India	21 April 2021
Last Updated: 21 April 2021

=== Most dismissals in a series ===
Rank	Dismissals	Player	Matches	Innings	Series
1	17	MS Dhoni	18	18	2013 Indian Premier League
2	16	MS Dhoni	15	15	2019 Indian Premier League
2	16	MS Dhoni	14	14	2020 Indian Premier League
4	14	MS Dhoni	16	16	2018 Indian Premier League
4	14	MS Dhoni	19	18	2012 Indian Premier League
Last Updated: 2 November 2020

== Individual Records (Fielding) ==
=== Most career catches ===
Rank	Catches	Player	Matches	Innings	Period
1	98	Suresh Raina	176	175	2008–2021
2	79	Ravindra Jadeja	160	159	2012–2024
3	62	Faf du Plessis	92	91	2011–2021
4	59	Dwayne Bravo	116	115	2012–2021
5	42	Ruturaj Gaikwad	78	78	2020–2026
Last Updated: 23 April 2026

=== Most catches in an innings ===
Rank	Dismissals	Player	Opposition	Venue	Date
1	4	Faf du Plessis	KKR	Eden Gardens, Kolkata, India	14 April 2019
1	4	Ravindra Jadeja	RR	Wankhede Stadium, Mumbai, India	19 April 2021
3	3	Suresh Raina	DD	Arun Jaitley Stadium, Delhi, India	19 March 2010
3	3	Srikkanth Anirudha	RCB	M. A. Chidambaram Stadium, Chennai, India	16 April 2011
3	3	Dwayne Bravo	PBKS	Punjab Cricket Association Stadium, Mohali, India	10 April 2013
3	3	Dwayne Bravo	DD	Arun Jaitley Stadium, Delhi, India	18 April 2013
3	3	Suresh Raina	DD	Sheikh Zayed Stadium, Abu Dhabi, UAE	21 April 2014
3	3	Dwayne Bravo	RR	M. A. Chidambaram Stadium, Chennai, India	10 May 2015
3	3	Ravindra Jadeja	MI	Wankhede Stadium, Mumbai, India	19 May 2015
3	3	Suresh Raina	RR	M. A. Chidambaram Stadium, Chennai, India	31 March 2019
3	3	Faf du Plessis	MI	Sheikh Zayed Stadium, Abu Dhabi, UAE	19 September 2020
Last Updated: 19 April 2021

=== Most catches in a series ===
Rank	Catches	Player	Matches	Innings	Series
1	17	Ruturaj Gaikwad	16	16	2023 Indian Premier League
2	14	Dwayne Bravo	18	18	2013 Indian Premier League
3	13	Faf du Plessis	15	15	2014 Indian Premier League
3	13	Dwayne Bravo	17	17	2015 Indian Premier League
3	13	Ravindra Jadeja	17	17	2015 Indian Premier League
5	12	Suresh Raina	16	16	2014 Indian Premier League
5	12	Faf du Plessis	12	12	2019 Indian Premier League
5	12	Faf du Plessis	13	13	2020 Indian Premier League
Last Updated: 30 May 2023

== Individual Records (Other) ==
=== Most matches ===
Rank	Matches	Player	Period
1	248	MS Dhoni	2008–2025
3	186	Ravindra Jadeja	2012–2025
2	176	Suresh Raina	2008–2021
4	116	Dwayne Bravo	2011–2022
5	106	Ravichandran Ashwin	2009–2025
Last Updated: 30 March 2025

=== Most matches as captain ===
Rank	Matches	Player	Won	Lost	Tied	NR	Win %	Period
1	212	MS Dhoni	128	82	0	2	60.95	2008–2023
2	27	Ruturaj Gaikwad	11	16	0	0	40.74	2024–2026
3	8	Ravindra Jadeja	2	6	0	0	25.00	2022-2022
4	5	Suresh Raina	1	3	1	0	30.00	2010–2019
Last Updated: 30 April 2026

== Partnership Record ==
=== Highest partnerships by wicket ===
Wicket	Runs	First batsman	Second batsman	Opposition	Venue	Date
1st Wicket	182	Ruturaj Gaikwad	Devon Conway	SRH	Maharashtra Cricket Association Stadium, Pune, India	1 May 2022
2nd Wicket	140*	Michael Hussey	Suresh Raina	MI	Arun Jaitley Stadium, Delhi, India	21 May 2013
3rd Wicket	165	Robin Uthappa	Shivam Dube	RCB	DY Patil Stadium, Navi Mumbai, India	12 April 2022
4th Wicket	109*	S Badrinath	MS Dhoni	KKR	Eden Gardens, Kolkata, India	16 March 2010
5th Wicket	102*	Ambati Rayudu	Ravindra Jadeja	MI	Arun Jaitley Stadium, Delhi, India	1 May 2021
6th Wicket	73*	Michael Hussey	S Badrinath	PBKS	Punjab Cricket Association Stadium, Mohali, India	19 April 2008
6th Wicket	73*	MS Dhoni	Dwayne Bravo	MI	M. Chinnaswamy Stadium, Bengaluru, India	23 May 2012
7th Wicket	59*	Ravindra Jadeja	MS Dhoni	RR	M.A.Chidambaram Stadium, Chennai, India	12 April 2023
8th Wicket	35*	MS Dhoni	Mohit Sharma	PBKS	M.A.Chidambaram Stadium, Chennai, India	30 May 2014
9th Wicket	43	Sam Curran	Imran Tahir	MI	Sharjah Cricket Stadium, Sharjah, UAE	23 October 2020
10th Wicket	26*	MS Dhoni	Mohit Sharma	MI	Wankhede Stadium, Mumbai, India	26 May 2013
Last Updated: 1 May 2021

=== Highest partnerships by runs ===
Wicket	runs	First batsman	Second batsman	Opposition	Venue	Date
1st Wicket	182	Ruturaj Gaikwad	Devon Conway	SRH	Maharashtra Cricket Association Stadium, Pune, India	1 May 2022
1st Wicket	181*	Shane Watson	Faf du Plessis	PBKS	Dubai International Stadium, Dubai, UAE	5 October 2020
3rd Wicket	165	Robin Uthappa	Shivam Dube	RCB	DY Patil Stadium, Navi Mumbai, India	12 April 2022
1st Wicket	159	Murali Vijay	Michael Hussey	RCB	M. A. Chidambaram Stadium, Chennai, India	28 May 2011
3rd Wicket	152	Murali Vijay	Albie Morkel	RR	M. A. Chidambaram Stadium, Chennai, India	3 April 2010
Last Updated: 1 May 2022
