= Vishal Joshi =

Indian cricketer (born 1989)

Personal information
- Full name: Vishal Joshi
- Born: 1 May 1989 (age 37); Ahmedabad, Gujarat, India
- Batting: Left-handed
- Bowling: Left-arm off break
- Role: Bowler

Domestic team information
- Years: Team
- 2009/10–present: Saurashtra

Career statistics
Competition	FC	T20
Matches	6	4
Runs scored	145	18
Batting average	20.75	6.00
100s/50s	0/1	0/0
Top score	55*	9
Balls bowled	819	84
Wickets	21	4
Bowling average	22.47	27.25
5 wickets in innings	1	0
10 wickets in match	0	n/a
Best bowling	5/43	2/29
Catches/stumpings	2/–	1/–
- Source: Cricinfo, 23 January 2013

Vishal Vinod kumar Joshi (born 1 May 1989 in Ahmedabad, Gujarat, India) is a cricketer who plays for Saurashtra in Indian domestic cricket. He is a Left-arm off break bowler who made his first-class debut in 2004 against Uttar Pradesh.

Joshi picked up 4/59 and 5/43 in the semifinal of the 2012–13 Ranji Trophy against Punjab to help Saurashtra register a 229-run victory. However, he was not selected in the team to play the final against Mumbai.
