= Javed Khan (cricketer) =

Indian cricketer (born 1990)

Personal information
- Full name: Javed Jais Khan
- Born: 20 October 1990 (age 36); Siddharthanagar, Maharashtra, India
- Batting: Right-handed
- Bowling: Right-arm medium-fast
- Role: Bowler

Domestic team information
- Years: Team
- 2010/11–2014–15: Mumbai

Career statistics
Competition	FC	List A	T20
Matches	17	2	9
Runs scored	344	10	24
Batting average	21.50	10.00	24.00
100s/50s	0/0	0/0	0/0
Top score	48	7*	14
Balls bowled	2404	48	204
Wickets	37	1	12
Bowling average	32.21	53.00	21.08
5 wickets in innings	0	0	0
10 wickets in match	0	0	0
Best bowling	4/53	1/48	3/15
Catches/stumpings	7/–	0/–	2/-
- Source: ESPNcricinfo, 30 March 2020

Javed Jais Khan (born 20 October 1990) is an Indian former first-class cricketer who represented Mumbai in domestic cricket from 2010 to 2015. He is a right-arm medium-fast bowler. Khan was selected by the Mumbai Indians for IPL 2013, but he did not play any matches for the team.
