= Soumya Swain =

Indian cricketer (born 1987)

Personal information
- Full name: Soumya Ranjan Swain
- Born: 3 April 1987 (age 39); Khordha, Odisha, India
- Source: Cricinfo, 16 October 2015

Soumya Ranjan Swain (born 3 April 1987) is an Indian first-class cricketer who played for Services.
