= Chennai Super Kings =

Indian Premier League cricket franchise

- League: Indian Premier League

Personnel
- Captain: Ruturaj Gaikwad
- Coach: Zaheer Khan
- Owner: Chennai Super Kings Cricket Limited

Team information
- City: Chennai
- Colours
- Founded: 24 January 2008; 18 years ago
- Home ground: M. A. Chidambaram Stadium, Chennai
- Capacity: 38,200

History
- IPL wins: 5 (2010, 2011, 2018, 2021, 2023)
- CLT20 wins: 2 (2010, 2014)
- Official website: chennaisuperkings.com
T20 kit

The Chennai Super Kings, also known as CSK, are a professional Twenty20 cricket team based in Chennai, Tamil Nadu, that competes in the Indian Premier League (IPL). The team was one of the eight debut franchises when the league was established in 2008. The team plays its home matches at the M. A. Chidambaram Stadium and is owned by Chennai Super Kings Cricket.

The Super Kings are the joint-most successful IPL franchise, along with Mumbai Indians, having won five IPL titles each. It has also appeared in ten finals and qualified for the playoff stages 12 times, the most amongst the IPL teams. The franchise has also won the Champions League Twenty20 twice in 2010 and 2014. The team is currently captained by Ruturaj Gaikwad.

The Super Kings were suspended for two years from the IPL from July 2015 to 2017 due to the involvement of its owners in the 2013 IPL spot-fixing and betting case. The franchise re-joined the tournament for the 2018 season and won the title in its comeback season. In January 2022, CSK became India's first unicorn sports enterprise. As of 2022, it was the second most valuable IPL franchise with a valuation of $1.15 billion.

== History ==
=== Early years (2008–09) ===
In September 2007, the Board of Control for Cricket in India (BCCI) announced the establishment of the Indian Premier League (IPL), a Twenty20 competition with the inaugural season planned for 2008. Chennai was one of the eight city-based franchises unveiled for the inaugural edition in January 2008.

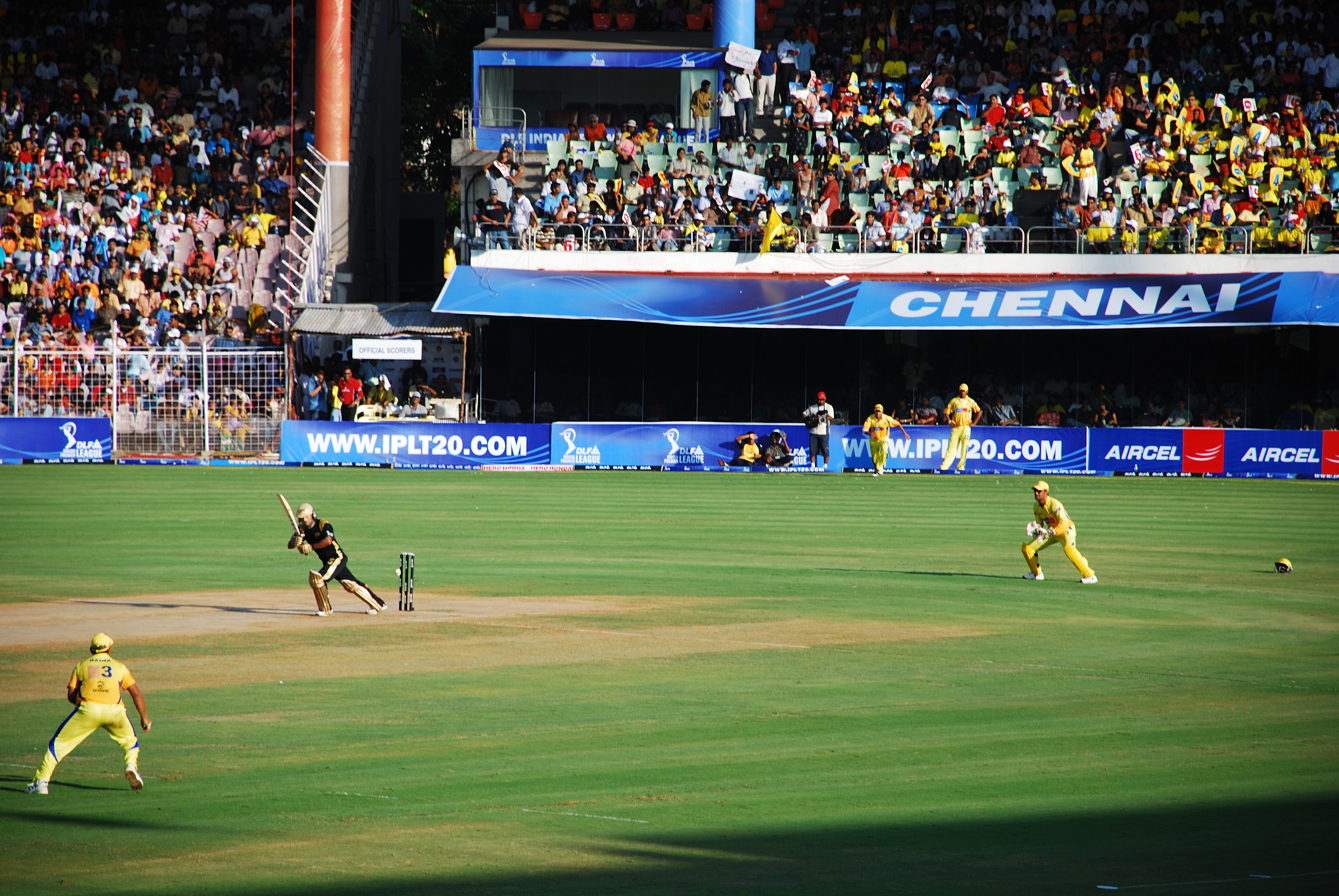
Chennai Super Kings playing the Kolkata Knight Riders at the M. A. Chidambaram Stadium in the 2008 Indian Premier League

The player auction for the inaugural IPL season took place in January 2008. Then-captain of the Indian team MS Dhoni was bought by the Super Kings for $1.5 million, the most expensive buy at the auction. The franchise also bought international cricketers Suresh Raina, Matthew Hayden, Jacob Oram, Stephen Fleming, Muttiah Muralitharan and Michael Hussey in the inaugural auction. Ahead of the inaugural season, the franchise named Dhoni as the captain of the team and appointed Kepler Wessels as the head coach. The team played its first game in the IPL on 19 April 2008 against Punjab Kings (then Kings XI Punjab) at Mohali, which it won by 33 runs. The Super Kings finished the league stage in third place with eight wins from 14 games. In the semifinal, the franchise beat Kings XI Punjab by nine wickets to reach the maiden IPL final. In the final at Mumbai, Rajasthan Royals won the match off the last ball to defeat the Super Kings and lifted the first IPL title. By finishing as the runners-up in the IPL, the Super Kings qualified for the inaugural season of the Champions League Twenty20 (CLT20). The tournament was later cancelled as a consequence of the 2008 Mumbai attacks and the Super Kings was given $5 million as compensation from the BCCI for the same.

Ahead of the 2009 season, Stephen Fleming took over as the head coach of the Super Kings. At the player auction, the franchise bought English all-rounder Andrew Flintoff for $1.55 million, making him the joint highest-paid cricketer in the IPL. Opening batter Hussey skipped the IPL season to focus on The Ashes. The Super Kings finished the league stage in second place with eight wins from 14 matches. In the semi-finals, the team lost to Royal Challengers Bangalore by six wickets. Super Kings opener Hayden won the Orange Cap as the leading run-scorer of the season with 572 runs.

=== Championship and further success (2010–12) ===
In 2010, the Super Kings struggled in the first half of the regular season, winning only two matches out of seven. They won five of their next seven games including a must-win encounter against Kings XI Punjab at Dharamshala. With seven wins from 14 matches, the team finished the league stage in third place and qualified for the semi-finals for the third consecutive season. In the semifinal, the Super Kings scored a modest 142/7 in 20 overs against the defending champions Deccan Chargers but restricted the opposition to 104 runs to score a 38-run victory. The Super Kings defeated Mumbai Indians by 22 runs in the final to secure their first ever IPL title. With the win, the franchise qualified for the 2010 Champions League Twenty20 that was to be held in South Africa. In the Champions League, the team finished at the top of Group A with three wins and a defeat. In the semifinal at Durban, the Super Kings defeated fellow IPL team Royal Challengers Bangalore by 52 runs. In their first CLT20 final at Johannesburg, they beat the Warriors of South Africa by eight wickets to win the tournament. Murali Vijay, who won the Man of the Match in the final, was awarded the Golden Bat for scoring the most runs in the tournament, and Ravichandran Ashwin, who was the leading wicket-taker, was adjudged the Player of the Series.

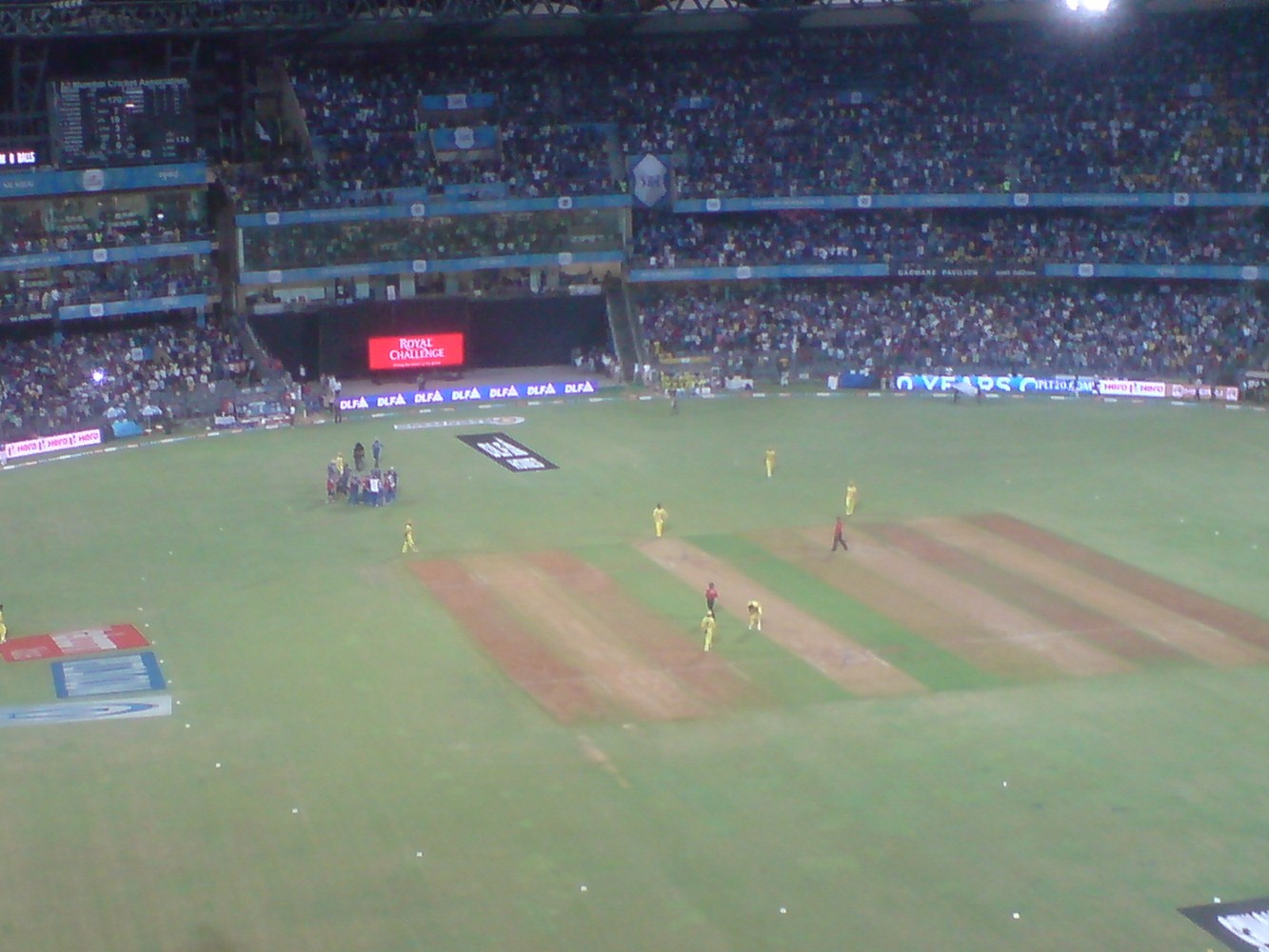
Chennai Super Kings playing Mumbai Indians at Wankhede Stadium in Mumbai during 2012 Indian Premier League

For the 2011 IPL season, a fresh auction was held after two new teams were added to the IPL. Each franchise was allowed to retain a maximum of four players from its current squad with a maximum of three Indian players. The Super Kings retained captain Dhoni, Raina, Vijay and South African Albie Morkel. In the subsequent auction, they bought back Hussey, Ashwin, Bollinger and Subramaniam Badrinath. In the 2011 season, they finished second in the league stage with nine wins and five losses. The team won the first qualifier against Royal Challengers by six wickets to qualify for the final. In the final, the Super Kings again met Royal Challengers in Chennai. The team won a second consecutive IPL title and Vijay was named as Man of the Match for his innings of 95 runs. In the Champions League held later that year, the Super Kings won only one out of their four group matches and finished at the bottom of the table.

Ahead of the 2012 IPL season, the franchise bought Indian all-rounder Ravindra Jadeja for $2 million at the players' auction. The Super Kings won only five of their first 12 games but won three of their last four matches to qualify for the playoffs. In the playoffs, the team beat Mumbai Indians by 38 runs and league stage table-toppers Delhi Daredevils by 86 runs in consecutive matches to qualify for the final. In their third consecutive final appearance, the Super Kings lost to Kolkata Knight Riders by five wickets. In the subsequent Champions League, the Super Kings ended with two wins from four matches and did not progress past the group stage.

=== Consistent performance and suspension (2013–17) ===
Ahead of the 2013 IPL season, the Super Kings strengthened their bowling by signing up five new bowlers. In the IPL season, the team finished on top of the group stage points table for the first time with 11 wins from 16 matches. During the season, they also equaled the record for most successive match wins in the IPL with seven wins. In the first qualifier against the Mumbai Indians at Delhi, the Super Kings won by 48 runs, aided by unbeaten half-centuries from Hussey and Raina, to qualify for the final. In the final against the same opposition at Kolkata, the team lost by 23 runs. Hussey top scored with 733 runs, winning the Orange Cap for the most runs in the season and Dwayne Bravo won the Purple Cap for the most wickets (32). The Super Kings qualified for the 2013 Champions League Twenty20 held in India in September–October. The team won three of the four matches in the group stage to qualify for the semi-finals, in which it lost to the Rajasthan Royals by 14 runs.

In May 2013, Gurunath Meiyappan, who was the team principal of the Super Kings, was arrested by Mumbai Police on charges of placing bets on IPL matches. In February 2014, a three-member panel appointed by the Supreme Court of India inquired into the betting case and indicted Meiyappan for illegal betting during the 2013 IPL season.

Before the 2014 season, the Super Kings retained Dhoni, Raina, Jadeja, Ashwin and Bravo ahead of the players' auction. At the auction, the franchise bought Brendon McCullum, Dwayne Smith, Faf du Plessis, Ashish Nehra and Mohit Sharma among others. The first phase of the IPL season was held in the UAE with the second phase returning to India, but the Super Kings' home matches were shifted from Chennai to Ranchi due to a dispute between the Government of Tamil Nadu and the Tamil Nadu Cricket Association. The Super Kings started the season with eight wins in their first ten matches before suffering from a dip in form towards the end of the regular season. The team recovered to finish third in the points table to qualify for the playoffs. In the first match of the playoffs, the team beat the Mumbai Indians by seven wickets before losing to the Kings XI Punjab team in the next match. In the 2014 Champions League, the Super Kings won two matches to finish second in the group stage to qualify for the semifinal. The team beat the Kings XI Punjab in the semi-finals by 65 runs. At the final in Bangalore, the Super Kings defeated then IPL champions Kolkata Knight Riders by eight wickets to win their second CLT20 title. Raina finished as the highest run-scorer of the tournament and was awarded Man of the Series.

Ahead of the 2015 season, the Super Kings got Hussey back and also bought Kyle Abbott, Irfan Pathan and Andrew Tye among others in the players' auction. In the group stage, the team topped the table with nine wins from 14 matches. In the playoffs, the Super Kings lost to the Mumbai Indians by 25 runs in the first qualifier before defeating the Royal Challengers Bangalore in the next match to qualify for the final. In the final, the team was again beaten by the Mumbai Indians by 41 runs. On 14 July 2015, the Supreme Court appointed committee headed by RM Lodha, suspended the Rajasthan Royals and the Chennai Super Kings franchises from the IPL for a period of two years due to the association of their owners with illegal betting.

=== Comeback (2018–20) ===
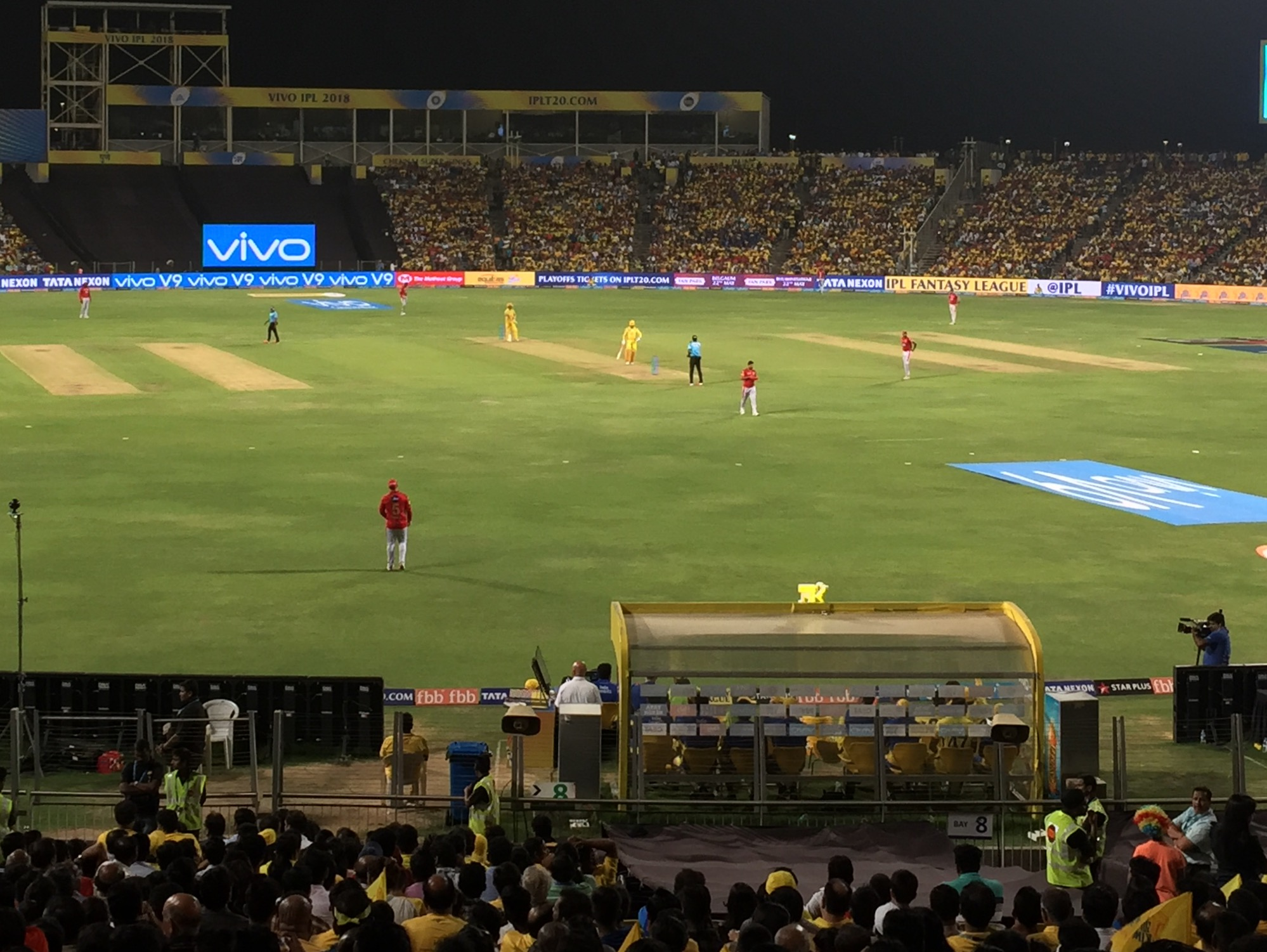
Chennai Super Kings playing the Kings XI Punjab in the 2018 Indian Premier League at MCA Stadium in Pune

Ahead of the player auction in 2018, the Super Kings retained Dhoni, Raina and Jadeja from its old team roster. In the auction, the franchise bought back Bravo, du Plessis, and Vijay. It also added international cricketers Imran Tahir, Lungi Ngidi, Mark Wood, Mitchell Santner, Sam Billings along with Indians Deepak Chahar and Shardul Thakur amongst others. Ahead of the team's return to the IPL after two seasons, anticipating fans turned up for the practice sessions held at the M. A. Chidambaram stadium in Chennai before the start of the tournament. The Super Kings started off with a one wicket win over the Mumbai Indians in their first match in over two years. The team finished the league stage in second place to qualify for the playoffs. The Super Kings beat the Sunrisers Hyderabad in the first qualifier to qualify for the final. The team beat the same opponent in the final to win the league for the third time. The Super Kings also became the first team to defeat a single opponent (Sunrisers Hyderabad) four times in a single season.

In the 2019 IPL season, the Super Kings finished second in the league stage with nine wins from 14 matches. In the playoffs, they lost to the Mumbai Indians in the first match before beating the Delhi Capitals in the next match to enter the final for a record eighth time. In the final, the Super Kings lost to the Mumbai Indians by one run. Tahir, who took 26 wickets, won the Purple Cap for the most wickets.

Before the 2020 season, the Super Kings bought Sam Curran, Josh Hazlewood and Piyush Chawla at the player auction. Due to the COVID-19 pandemic, the IPL was initially postponed and later shifted to the UAE. Many members of the Super Kings' team tested positive for the coronavirus, and players such as Raina and Harbhajan Singh pulled out of the tournament citing personal reasons. In the first match, the Super Kings beat the defending champions Mumbai Indians. The team finished seventh overall in the group stage points table and failed to make it to the playoffs for the first time. The team's captain Dhoni drew criticism from the supporters over his form and team selection. The franchise released many of the players including Chawla, Vijay and Kedar Jadhav before the player auction for the 2021 season.

=== Further success and transition (2021–2024) ===
In the 2021 player auction, the Super Kings bought Cheteshwar Pujara, Krishnappa Gowtham and Moeen Ali and traded in Robin Uthappa from the Rajasthan Royals. In the 2021 season, the team won five of the first seven matches before the season was suspended midway due to increase in number of COVID-19 cases. The second leg of the season resumed in the UAE with the Super Kings finishing second in the group stage to qualify for the playoffs. In the playoffs, the team beat the Delhi Capitals to reach the finals for the ninth time in their history. In the finals, the Super Kings beat the Kolkata Knight Riders to win their fourth IPL title.

Before the start of the 2022 IPL season, the Super Kings announced that Jadeja will replace Dhoni as the captain of the team. After the team lost six of the first eight matches in the season, Jadeja handed the captaincy back to Dhoni on 30 March 2022. The Super Kings finished ninth out of the ten teams in the group stage and failed to qualify for the playoffs for only the second time in their IPL history.

In the player auction before the start of the 2023 IPL season, the Super Kings bought Ben Stokes, Kyle Jamieson and Ajinkya Rahane. Bravo retired and re-signed with the team as the bowling coach, replacing Lakshmipathy Balaji. During the early part of the season, Chahar and Jamieson were ruled out due to injuries, and Stokes was out for most of the season due to various injuries. The team finished second in the group stage with 17 points from eight wins. The Super Kings won the first qualifier against the Gujarat Titans, making it into their tenth IPL finals in 14 seasons. In the final in Ahmedabad, the Super Kings beat defending champions Gujarat Titans by five wickets to win a record equaling fifth title.

In the player auction before the 2024 season, the Super Kings bought back Thakur and added Daryl Mitchell, Sameer Rizvi, Mustafizur Rahman and Rachin Ravindra to the squad. On 21 March 2024, Dhoni handed over the captaincy of the team to Ruturaj Gaikwad. In the group stage, the Super Kings finished with 14 points from seven wins from 14 matches. The team was tied with three other teams in the competition for the fourth and final play-off spot but finished fifth behind the Royal Challengers Bangalore on net run rate after the loss to the same team in its final group match. Hence, the team failed to qualify for the IPL playoffs for only the third time in the history of the competition.

=== Later years (2025-present) ===
Ahead of the 2025 season, the Super Kings retained only five players–Gaikwad, Dhoni and Jadeja, Shivam Dube and Matheesha Pathirana while releasing the others. In the subsequent player auction, the franchise bought 20 players, which included ten capped players and six overseas players. The team bought back Mukesh Choudhary, Devon Conway, Sam Curran, Shaik Rasheed, and Rachin Ravindra, who played for the franchise in the previous seasons. The Super Kings spent ₹100 million (US$1.1 million) to buy Noor Ahmad and ₹97.5 million (US$1.0 million) on Ashwin, who had previously played for the team from 2009 to 2015. The team had a poor season, and lost eight of its first ten matches and was the first team to be eliminated from contention for the playoffs. The Super Kings lost five matches at home in a season for the first time, and was eliminated in group stages in consecutive seasons for the first time since the inauguration of the tournament. The team secured two more wins from the last four matches, and finished bottom of the points table for the first time in an IPL season with eight points.

In November 2025, ahead of the auction for the 2026 season, the Super Kings released 11 players including four overseas players. In August 2025, Ashwin announced his retirement, and in November 2025, CSK traded in Sanju Samson from the Rajasthan Royals, in exchange for Jadeja and Curran. In the player auction held in December 2025, the team bought nine players, including Kartik Sharma and Prashant Veer, who were picked up for ₹142 million (US$1.5 million) each and became the joint-most expensive uncapped players in the history of IPL. In the 2026 season, the Super Kings started with three straight losses, before winning six of the next eight games. However, the team lost the next three matches, and finished with 12 points from 14 games. The team suffered from injuries to several players, including former captain Dhoni, who never played a single game. It was the third consecutive season that the team failed to make it to the playoffs.

In July 2026, the Super Kings mutually parted ways with head coach Stephen Fleming, and in September 2026, Zaheer Khan was appointed as his successor.

== Crest and colours ==
The franchise was named as the Super Kings in honour of the rulers of the erstwhile Tamil kingdoms. The name was chosen from over 25,000 entries received in a naming contest. The logo consists of a head of a roaring lion in orange with a crown on the top and the team name rendered below in blue. The team's primary colour is yellow and the current jersey introduced in 2021 includes a camouflage pattern at the shoulders and a roaring lion background pattern. The team's anthem is titled "Whistle Podu" (transl. Blow the whistle), the latest version of which was released in 2018.

== Grounds ==
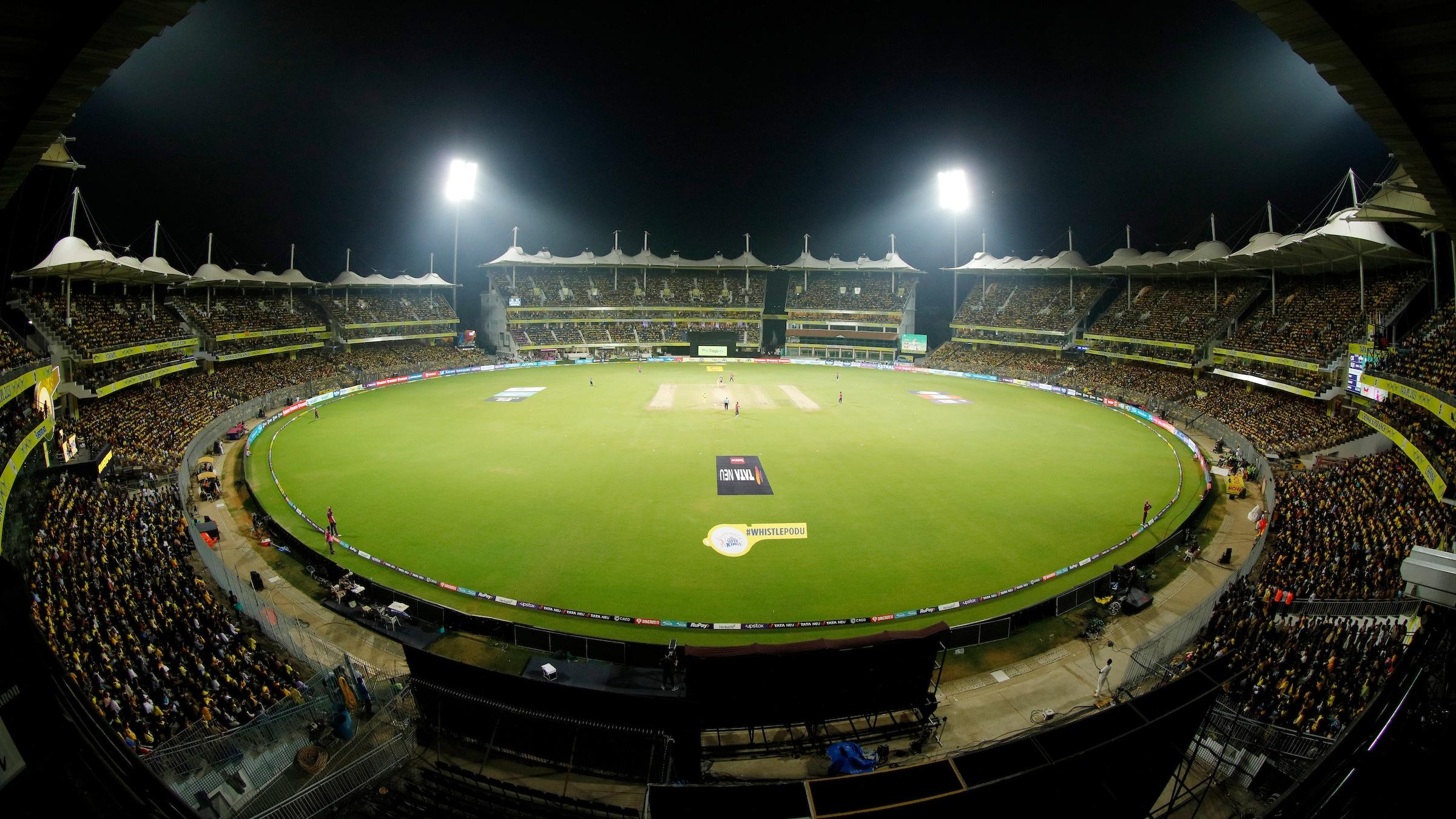
M. A. Chidambaram Stadium before an IPL match in 2023

The Super Kings play their home matches at the M. A. Chidambaram Stadium (also known as "Chepauk") in Chennai, which is one of the oldest cricket stadiums in India. The stadium is owned by the Tamil Nadu Cricket Association and has a seating capacity of 38,000. The stadium is often referred to as "Fortress Chepauk", "Lions' den", and "AnbuDen", with "anbu" meaning "love" in Tamil.

In 2014, the Super Kings played their home matches at the JSCA International Cricket Stadium at Ranchi due to a dispute with the Government of Tamil Nadu regarding the usage of three stands at the Chepauk stadium. In 2018, the team played six of its home games at the Maharashtra Cricket Association Stadium in Pune after members of some of the political parties staged protests outside the Chepauk stadium and the Tamil Nadu Police indicated their inability to provide security for the subsequent matches.

== Brand ==
The Super Kings has consistently been named amongst the most valuable sporting franchises in India. In a February 2013 report by London based Brand Finance, in which the Super Kings was placed in the 147th place amongst the top 150 most valuable teams in the world with a brand value of $46 million. In January 2022, the Super Kings became the first unicorn sports enterprise in India. In 2022, the Super Kings were named as the second most valuable IPL franchise with a valuation of $1.15 billion.

=== Kit suppliers and shirt sponsors ===
Period	Kit supplier	Shirt sponsor (front)	Shirt sponsor (back)
2008–2015	Reebok	Aircel	India Cements
2015–2016	Spartan	Aircel	India Cements
2018–2021	Seven	Muthoot Group	India Cements
2021–2022	Seven	Myntra	India Cements
2022–2024	Seven	Eurogrip Tyres	India Cements
2024–2025	PlayR	Eurogrip Tyres	Etihad Airways
2025–present	PlayR	Etihad Airways	FedEx

Telecom service provider Aircel became the first shirt sponsor for the team after it signed a three-year deal in 2008. The deal was renewed in 2011 for ₹850 million (US$9.1 million), then the most expensive sponsorship deal in the IPL. Muthoot Group was the principal shirt sponsor from 2018 to 2020 after which Myntra took over as the principal shirt sponsor for the 2021 season.

In 2022, tyre maker Eurogrip Tyres signed up with the franchise as the principal shirt sponsor on a three-year deal worth over ₹1 billion (US$11 million). Etihad Airways signed as one of the principal sponsors ahead of 2024 season with the brand displayed on the backside of the jersey. Ahead of the 2025 season, Etihad became the primary shirt sponsor, and the franchise signed a multi-year deal with FedEx, by which the company became the official logistics partner and the logo placed in the back of the shirts. The team also has sponsorship deals with India Cements, Gulf Oil, SNJ Breweries, Reliance Jio, Astral Pipes, ICICI Bank, Coca-Cola and Vision11.

Reebok, owned by German brand Adidas, was the official kit supplier for the Super Kings from 2008 to 2014. From the 2015 season, Australian apparel and sports gear manufacturer Spartan manufactured kits for the team. Indian apparel brand Seven became the official merchandising partner of the Super Kings in 2018. Chennai Super Kings is registered as a brand and sells cricket kits, apparel and other merchandise.

=== Support ===
The team has a significant fan following, colloquially referred to as the "Yellow Army". The official fan club of the Super Kings called the "Whistle Podu Army", was founded in January 2016. The team has the highest number of followers in the social media amongst the IPL teams with over 33 million followers across X, Facebook and Instagram as of March 2023. The home matches of the team register significant attendance with the fans often turning up to watch the team's practice sessions at Chennai. When the team's home games were moved to Pune in 2018, a charter train between Chennai and Pune was arranged by the franchise to ferry the fans.

== Rivalries ==
=== Mumbai Indians rivalry ===
The Super Kings have played the Mumbai Indians 41 times in the IPL, with Chennai winning 20 of those matches. They are the two most successful IPL teams with five titles each. The two teams have met each other at the final of the IPL four times, with Mumbai winning thrice and Chennai winning once.

=== Royal Challengers Bengaluru rivalry ===
The rivalry between the Super Kings and Royal Challengers Bengaluru is called the "Southern derby" or "Kaveri derby", derived from the Kaveri River water dispute between Tamil Nadu and Karnataka. The Super Kings have won 22 of the 37 matches between the teams, and have beaten the Royal Challengers in the only meeting between the two teams in an IPL final in 2011. The Super Kings have a superior record at its home ground in Chennai, and have lost only twice to the Royal Challengers, in 2008 and 2025. Since the 2024 season, the Royal Challengers are on a four match winning streak against the Super Kings.

== Ownership and finances ==
When the IPL was launched in 2008, the Chennai franchise was sold to the India Cements for $91 million, making it the fourth most expensive team in the league. N. Srinivasan, who was then the treasurer and vice-chairman of the BCCI, became the de facto owner of the Super Kings as the managing director of India Cements. In September 2008, former BCCI President A. C. Muthiah wrote to then BCCI President citing the BCCI regulations, which prevented any administrator from holding commercial interests in the matches conducted by the board. Subsequently, the regulations were amended by the BCCI to exclude the IPL and a case was filed against the same in the Madras High Court. In 2013, he Muthiah moved to the Supreme Court to stop Srinivasan from taking over as the President of BCCI, which was rejected and Srinivasan was elected as the President of BCCI. In a subsequent decision announced on 22 January 2015, the Supreme Court stuck down the 2008 amendment to the BCCI constitution that allowed board officials to have a commercial interest in the IPL. As a result, the Super Kings franchise was transferred to a separate entity named Chennai Super Kings Cricket Limited.

As of 2021, about 30% of the franchise is owned by the trustees and shareholders of India Cements. The Super Kings recorded revenues of ₹4.18 billion (US$45 million) with a net profit of ₹1.11 billion (US$12 million) for FY 2018–19. In the FY 2020–21, the revenue dropped to ₹2.54 billion (US$27 million) with a net profit of ₹402 million (US$4.3 million). The franchise generates revenues from broadcasting deals, match day tickets, in-stadium advertising and merchandise sales. Majority of the revenue comes from broadcasting rights which contributes about 60% of the total revenue, followed by around 20% from sponsorship deals and about 10–15% from ticket sales.

== Players ==
=== Current squad ===
- Players with international caps are listed in **bold**.
- * denotes a player who was unavailable during the latest season.

No.	Name	Nat.	Birth date	Batting style	Bowling style	Salary	Notes
Batters
	**Ruturaj Gaikwad**	(India)	31 January 1997 (age 29)	Right-handed	Right-arm off break	₹18 crore (US$1.9 million)	
	**Sarfaraz Khan**	(India)	22 October 1997 (age 29)	Right-handed	Right-arm leg break	₹75 lakh (US$80,000)	
	**Dewald Brevis**	(South Africa)	29 April 2003 (age 23)	Right-handed	Right-arm leg break	₹2.2 crore (US$240,000)	Overseas
	Ayush Mhatre	(India)	16 July 2007 (age 19)	Right-handed	Right-arm off break	₹30 lakh (US$32,000)	
Wicket-keepers
	**Sanju Samson**	(India)	11 November 1994 (age 32)	Right-handed	—N/a	₹18 crore (US$1.9 million)	
	Urvil Patel	(India)	17 October 1998 (age 28)	Right-handed	—N/a	₹30 lakh (US$32,000)	
	Kartik Sharma	(India)	26 April 2006 (age 20)	Right-handed	—N/a	₹14.2 crore (US$1.5 million)	
All-rounders
	**Shivam Dube**	(India)	26 June 1993 (age 33)	Left-handed	Right-arm medium	₹12 crore (US$1.3 million)	
	**Liam Livingstone**	(England)	4 August 1993 (age 33)	Right-handed	Right-arm leg break	₹6 crore (US$640,000)	Overseas
	**Jamie Overton**	(England)	10 April 1994 (age 32)	Right-handed	Right-arm fast	₹1.5 crore (US$160,000)	Overseas
	Ramakrishna Ghosh	(India)	28 August 1997 (age 29)	Right-handed	Right-arm medium-fast	₹30 lakh (US$32,000)	
	**Jack Edwards**	(Australia)	19 April 2000 (age 26)	Right-handed	Right-arm medium	₹3 crore (US$320,000)	Overseas
	**Anshul Kamboj**	(India)	6 December 2000 (age 25)	Right-handed	Right-arm fast-medium	₹3.4 crore (US$360,000)	
Pace bowlers
	Mukesh Choudhary	(India)	6 July 1996 (age 30)	Left-handed	Left-arm fast-medium	₹30 lakh (US$32,000)	
	Gurjapneet Singh	(India)	8 November 1998 (age 28)	Right-handed	Left-arm fast-medium	₹2.2 crore (US$240,000)	
Spin bowlers
	**Akeal Hosein**	(Cricket West Indies)	25 April 1993 (age 33)	Left-handed	Slow left-arm orthodox	₹2 crore (US$210,000)	Overseas
	Shreyas Gopal	(India)	4 September 1993 (age 33)	Right-handed	Right-arm leg break	₹30 lakh (US$32,000)	
	**Rahul Chahar**	(India)	4 August 1999 (age 27)	Right-handed	Right-arm leg break	₹5.2 crore (US$560,000)	
	**Noor Ahmad**	(Afghanistan)	3 January 2005 (age 21)	Right-handed	Left-arm wrist-spin	₹10 crore (US$1.1 million)	Overseas

=== Captains ===
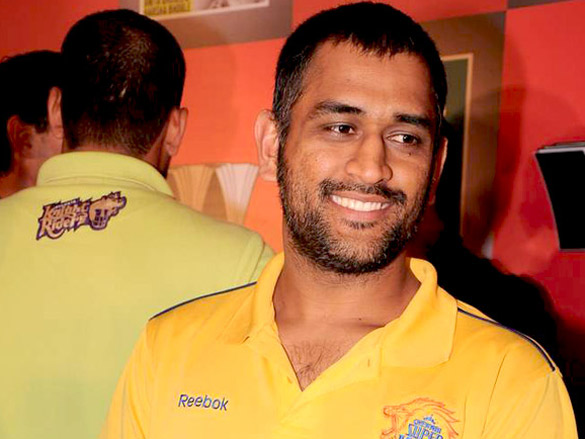
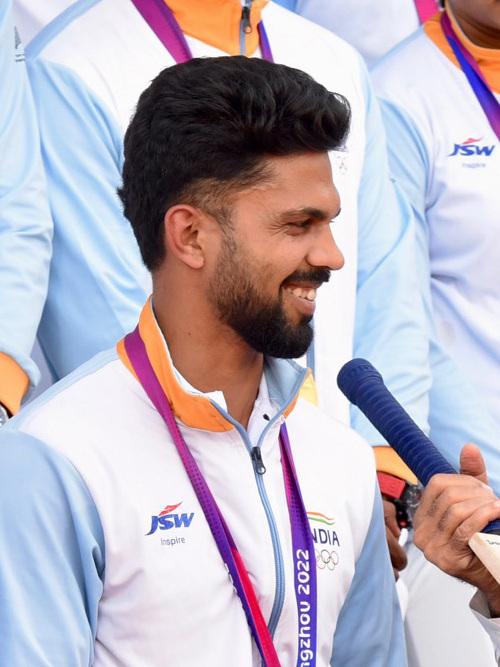
MS Dhoni (left) is the most successful captain while Ruturaj Gaikwad took over as captain since 2024

Dhoni led the team from 2008 to 2023 and is one of the most successful captains in the IPL, having led the Super Kings to ten finals of which the team has won five. In 2022, Jadeja was appointed as the captain succeeding Dhoni but handed the captaincy back to Dhoni after a poor start to the IPL season. Gaikwad was appointed as the captain before the start of the 2024 IPL season. During the 2025 IPL season, Gaikwad was ruled out for the rest of the season due to injury and Dhoni was the stand-in captain.

Player	Nationality	From	To	Matches	Won	Lost	Tied	NR	Win%
MS Dhoni	India	2008	2025	244	145	96	1	0	59.43
Suresh Raina	India	2010	2019	6	2	3	1	0	33.33
Ravindra Jadeja	India	2022	2022	8	2	6	0	0	25.00
Ruturaj Gaikwad	India	2024	present	33	14	19	0	0	42.42

Last updated: 24 May 2026; Source: Cricinfo

== Hall of fame ==
The Hall of fame was introduced in March 2026 to recognise players for their contributions to the franchise. The inductees include:

- (India) Suresh Raina
- (Australia) Matthew Hayden

== Support staff ==
=== Current coaching staff ===
Position	Staff
Head Coach	(India) Zaheer Khan
Team Mentor	(India) MS Dhoni
Bowling Coach	(India) Mohit Sharma
Assistant Coach	(South Africa) Albie Morkel (England) Gareth Batty (India) Sridharan Sriram
Fielding Coach	(England) James Foster

Source: Official website

=== List of head coaches ===
Name	Image	Nationality	Tenure
Kepler Wessels		South Africa	2008
Stephen Fleming		New Zealand	2009–2015, 2018–2026
Zaheer Khan		India	2027–

== Statistics ==
=== By season ===
==== Indian Premier League ====
Year	Matches	Won	Lost	NR	Group Stage	Final Result	Most Runs	Most Wickets
2008	16	9	7	0	3/8	Runners-up	Suresh Raina (421)	Albie Morkel (17)
2009	15	8	6	1	2/8	Semi-finalists	Matthew Hayden^{[†]} (572)	Muttiah Muralitharan (14)
2010	16	9	7	0	3/8	Champions	Suresh Raina (520)	Muttiah Muralitharan (15)
2011	16	11	5	0	2/10	Champions	Michael Hussey (492)	Ravichandran Ashwin (20)
2012	19	10	8	1	4/9	Runners-up	Suresh Raina (441)	Ben Hilfenhaus (14)
2013	18	12	6	0	2/9	Runners-up	Michael Hussey^{[†]} (733)	Dwayne Bravo^{[§]} (32)
2014	16	10	6	0	3/8	Playoffs	Dwayne Smith (566)	Mohit Sharma^{[§]} (23)
2015	17	10	7	0	1/8	Runners-up	Brendon McCullum (436)	Dwayne Bravo^{[§]} (26)
2016	Suspended							
2017	Suspended							
2018	16	11	5	0	2/8	Champions	Ambati Rayudu (602)	Shardul Thakur (16)
2019	17	10	7	0	2/8	Runners-up	MS Dhoni (416)	Imran Tahir^{[§]} (26)
2020	14	6	8	0	7/8	League stage	Faf du Plessis (449)	Sam Curran (13)
2021	16	11	5	0	2/8	Champions	Ruturaj Gaikwad^{[†]} (635)	Shardul Thakur (21)
2022	14	4	10	0	9/10	League stage	Ruturaj Gaikwad (368)	Dwayne Bravo (16)
2023	16	10	5	1	2/10	Champions	Devon Conway (672)	Tushar Deshpande (21)
2024	14	7	7	0	5/10	League stage	Ruturaj Gaikwad (583)	Tushar Deshpande (17)
2025	14	4	10	0	10/10	League stage	Shivam Dube (357)	Noor Ahmad (24)
2026	14	6	8	0	8/10	League stage	Sanju Samson (477)	Anshul Kamboj (21)
Total	268	148	117	3	55.22%	(5 Titles)		

Last updated: 24 May 2026; Source: IPLT20 website

Key

- ^{†} Won the Orange cap for the top run scorer in the season
- ^{§} Won the Purple cap for the top wicket taker in the season

==== Champions League Twenty20 ====
Year	Standing
2008	Tournament Cancelled
2009	Did not qualify
2010	Champions
2011	League stage
2012	League stage
2013	Semi-finalists
2014	Champions

Source: Cricinfo

=== By opposition ===
Table include records from matches against IPL franchises in both the IPL and CLT20.

Opposition	Span	IPL				CLT20			Total				Win (%)
Opposition	Span	M	W	L	NR	M	W	L	M	W	L	NR	Win (%)
Mumbai Indians	2008–2026	41	20	21	0	2	1	1	43	21	22	0	48.84
Royal Challengers Bengaluru	2008–2026	36	21	14	1	1	1	0	37	22	14	1	59.46
Punjab Kings	2008–2026	33	16	17	0	1	1	0	34	17	17	0	50.50
Delhi Capitals	2008–2026	33	21	12	0	—N/a	—N/a	—N/a	33	21	12	0	63.64
Kolkata Knight Riders	2008–2026	33	21	11	1	2	1	1	34	22	12	1	64.71
Rajasthan Royals	2008–2015, 2018–2026	32	16	16	0	1	0	1	33	16	17	0	48.49
Sunrisers Hyderabad	2013–2026	23	15	8	0	1	1	0	24	16	8	0	66.66
Gujarat Titans	2022–2025	9	4	5	0	—N/a	—N/a	—N/a	8	4	4	0	44.44
Lucknow Super Giants	2022–2025	7	3	3	1	—N/a	—N/a	—N/a	7	3	3	1	42.86
Deccan Chargers	2008–2012	10	6	4	0	---			10	6	4	0	60.00
Kochi Tuskers Kerala	2011	2	1	1	0	---			2	1	1	0	50.00
Pune Warriors India	2011–2013	6	4	2	0	---			6	4	2	0	66.66
Total	2008–2026	265	148	114	3	8	5	3	273	153	117	3	56.05

Last updated: 10 May 2026

Team now defunct

== In popular culture ==
In 2019, a documentary television series titled Roar of the Lion aired on Disney+ Hotstar which dealt with the ban of the Super Kings franchise from the IPL in 2016 and its return to win the title in 2018. In the 2024 Tamil-language film The Greatest of All Time, archived footage featuring Dhoni for the Super Kings in an IPL match was used.

== See also ==
- List of Chennai Super Kings cricketers
- List of Chennai Super Kings records
- Joburg Super Kings
- Texas Super Kings
