= Two-wheeler =

Vehicle operating on two wheels

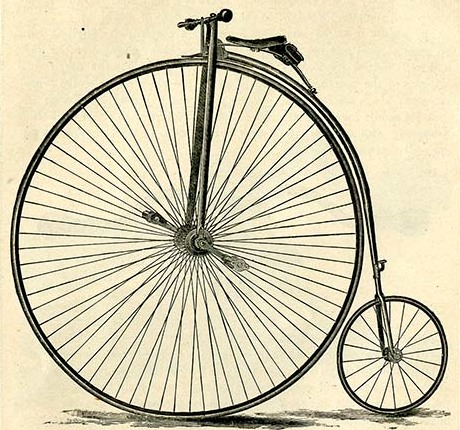
Penny-farthing bicycle

A two-wheeler is a vehicle that runs on two wheels.

The two wheels may be arranged in tandem, one behind the other, as with single-track vehicles, or arranged and also side by side, on the same axle. If on the same axle, the vehicle may have no other support, as with dicycles, or have additional support, which is often also the source of motive power.

Wheeled single-track vehicles include:

- Dandy horses, velocipedes, or draisines, forerunners of bicycles
- Bicycles, a pedal-powered two-wheeler
- Motorcycles, a motor-powered two-wheeler, similar in construction with bicycles
- Gyrocars, a self-balancing car on two wheels

Dicycles include:

- Self-balancing scooters, also known as hoverboards
- Segway PTs, a brand of self-balancing personal transporters

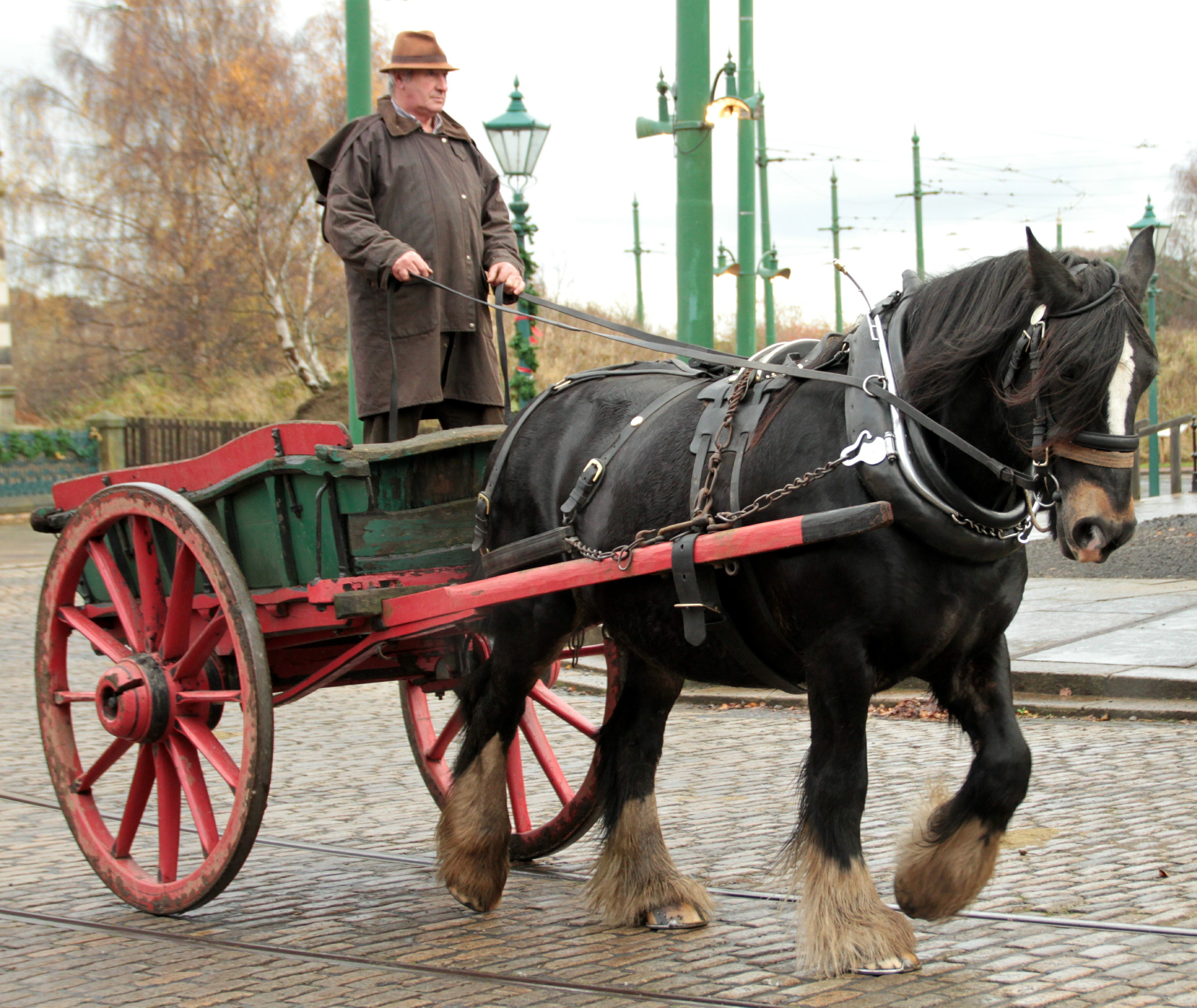
Horse-drawn cart

Two-wheelers intended to be used with additional support, which is also the source of motive power, include:

- Carts, horse-drawn (or other animal-drawn) and sometimes referred to as a 'car' or 'carriage')
- Hand trucks, two-wheeled devices used for transporting bulky or heavy items such as furniture or golf clubs (golf trolley)
- Shopping trolley (caddy)
- Many trailers, especially semi-trailers

Two-wheelers intended to be used with additional support, which is not the source of motive power, include:

- Two-wheel tractors

== Road safety ==
In 2022, the World Health Organization reported that nearly 30% of road crash deaths worldwide involve powered two- and three-wheeled vehicles such as motorcycles, mopeds, scooters and e-bikes, and that these deaths are increasing. In the WHO South-East Asia Region, such vehicles are involved in 43% of all road traffic deaths.
