= Ankeet Chavan =

Indian cricketer (born 1985)

Personal information
- Full name: Ankeet Anil Chavan
- Born: 28 October 1985 (age 41); Mumbai, Maharashtra, India
- Batting: Left-handed
- Bowling: Slow left-arm orthodox
- Role: All-rounder

Domestic team information
- Years: Team
- 2007/08–2012/13: Mumbai
- 2011–2013: Rajasthan Royals

Career statistics
Competition	FC	LA	T20
Matches	18	20	26
Runs scored	571	254	154
Batting average	35.68	21.16	17.11
100s/50s	1/1	0/1	0/0
Top score	102*	58	44*
Balls bowled	3,597	896	476
Wickets	53	18	19
Bowling average	36.43	39.27	33.31
5 wickets in innings	1	0	0
10 wickets in match	1	0	0
Best bowling	9/23	3/23	4/29
Catches/stumpings	10/–	6/–	5/-
- Source: ESPNcricinfo, 24 March 2025

Ankeet Chavan (born 28 October 1985) is a former cricketer who played for Mumbai in Indian domestic cricket. He was an all-rounder who batted left-handed and bowled slow left-arm orthodox. He also played for Rajasthan Royals in Indian Premier League.

== Spot fixing controversy ==
=== Criminal Case ===
On 16 May 2013, Delhi police arrested Chavan on spot-fixing charges during IPL 6 along with Ajit Chandila and Sreesanth, who played alongside him for Rajasthan Royals. According to police, Chavan was promised ₹6 million (US$64,000) to give away 14 runs in Rajasthan Royals' match against Mumbai Indians on 15 May 2013 and he gave away 15 runs in his second over.

Having been put in judicial custody in Tihar Central Jail, New Delhi, Chavan was granted bail from 31 May to 6 June to solemnise his marriage which had been fixed for 2 June 2013 and was granted bail on 10 June 2013 along with the other accused.

Delhi Police filed 6,000-page Charge Sheet against 42 persons, including Chavan before the Patiala House Court, Delhi. In July 2015, the Patiala Court discharged all the 36 accused persons, including Sreesanth, Chandila, Singh and Ankeet Chavan, except the 06 absconding persons.

The Discharge has been challenged by the Delhi Police before the Delhi High Court, where it is presently pending.

=== Disciplinary Case ===
After being arrested, he was immediately suspended by his employer, Air India. He has been suspended from his cricketing career.

On 13 September 2013, Chavan and fellow player Sreesanth were banned from cricket for life by the BCCI disciplinary committee .

On 16 June 2021, BCCI lifted ban on Ankeet Chavan and now he's allowed to play cricket.
