= List of 2026 Indian Premier League personnel changes =

2026 Indian Premier League auction

General information
- Sport: Cricket
- Date: 16 December 2025
- Time: 14:30 IST (13:00 local)
- Location: Abu Dhabi, United Arab Emirates
- Networks: Star Sports (TV); JioHotstar (Digital)

Overview
- 77 total selections in 11 rounds
- League: 2026 Indian Premier League
- Teams: 10
- Most selections: 13 by Kolkata Knight Riders
- Fewest selections: 4 by Punjab Kings

The 2026 Indian Premier League was the 19th edition of the Indian Premier League (IPL), a professional Twenty20 (T20) cricket league held in India, which was organised by the Board of Control for Cricket in India (BCCI). It has been held annually since the first edition in 2008. In July 2024, the IPL Governing Council announced that a mega auction would be conducted for the 2025 season followed by mini auctions in 2026 and 2027.

The franchises were required to submit their retention lists before 15 November 2025, and a total of 173 players were retained ahead of the auction. The auction was held on 16 December 2025 in Abu Dhabi, United Arab Emirates, with the auction purse for each franchise set at ₹125 crore (US$13 million). A total of 1,355 players registered for the auction, of which 369 players were shortlisted and 156 were featured in the auction and 77 were sold in the auction. Cameron Green became the most expensive overseas player and the third most expensive player in the history of the IPL when he was bought by Kolkata Knight Riders for ₹25.20 crore (US$2.6 million). Prashant Veer and Kartik Sharma became the joint-most expensive uncapped players in the history of the IPL when they were both bought by Chennai Super Kings for ₹14.20 crore (US$1.5 million) each. The 79 unsold players included players such as Jake Fraser-McGurk, Jonny Bairstow, Daryl Mitchell, Devon Conway, Alzarri Joseph, Gus Atkinson, Deepak Hooda and Karn Sharma.

== Pre-auction ==
Retired players
Date	Name	2025 team	Age	Ref.
27 August 2025	Ravichandran Ashwin	Chennai Super Kings	38	
30 November 2025	Andre Russell	Kolkata Knight Riders	37	
3 December 2025	Mohit Sharma	Delhi Capitals	37	

Traded players
Date	Name	Salary	From	To	Ref.
13 November 2025	Shardul Thakur	₹2 crore (US$210,000)	Lucknow Super Giants	Mumbai Indians	
13 November 2025	Sherfane Rutherford	₹2.6 crore (US$270,000)	Gujarat Titans	Mumbai Indians	
13 November 2025	Ravindra Jadeja	₹14 crore (US$1.5 million)	Chennai Super Kings	Rajasthan Royals	
13 November 2025	Sam Curran	₹2.4 crore (US$250,000)	Chennai Super Kings	Rajasthan Royals	
13 November 2025	Sanju Samson	₹18 crore (US$1.9 million)	Rajasthan Royals	Chennai Super Kings	
15 November 2025	Mohammed Shami	₹10 crore (US$1.0 million)	Sunrisers Hyderabad	Lucknow Super Giants	
15 November 2025	Donovan Ferreira	₹1 crore (US$100,000)	Delhi Capitals	Rajasthan Royals	
15 November 2025	Nitish Rana	₹4.2 crore (US$440,000)	Rajasthan Royals	Delhi Capitals	
15 November 2025	Mayank Markande	₹30 lakh (US$31,000)	Kolkata Knight Riders	Mumbai Indians	
15 November 2025	Arjun Tendulkar	₹30 lakh (US$31,000)	Mumbai Indians	Lucknow Super Giants	

== Player retention ==
=== Retention policy ===
The ten franchises were allowed to retain any number of players from their squad, including traded players while excluding players signed as temporary replacements. The auction purse for each franchise was set at ₹125 crore (US$13 million). Franchises were deducted a specific amount from the auction purse for every retained player.

=== Retained players ===
The franchises were required to submit their retention lists before 15 November 2025, and a total of 173 players were retained ahead of the auction.

- Sources: BCCI, Cricinfo, Olympics.com

Chennai Super Kings
No.	Player	Nationality	Salary
1	Ruturaj Gaikwad	India	₹18 crore (US$1.9 million)
2	Sanju Samson	India	₹18 crore (US$1.9 million)
3	Shivam Dube	India	₹12 crore (US$1.2 million)
4	Noor Ahmad	Afghanistan	₹10 crore (US$1.0 million)
5	Khaleel Ahmed	India	₹4.8 crore (US$500,000)
6	MS Dhoni	India	₹4 crore (US$420,000)
7	Anshul Kamboj	India	₹3.4 crore (US$350,000)
8	Dewald Brevis	South Africa	₹2.2 crore (US$230,000)
9	Gurjapneet Singh	India	₹2.2 crore (US$230,000)
10	Nathan Ellis	Australia	₹2 crore (US$210,000)
11	Jamie Overton	England	₹1.5 crore (US$160,000)
12	Mukesh Choudhary	India	₹30 lakh (US$31,000)
13	Ramakrishna Ghosh	India	₹30 lakh (US$31,000)
14	Shreyas Gopal	India	₹30 lakh (US$31,000)
15	Ayush Mhatre	India	₹30 lakh (US$31,000)
16	Urvil Patel	India	₹30 lakh (US$31,000)

Delhi Capitals
No.	Player	Nationality	Salary
1	Axar Patel	India	₹16.5 crore (US$1.7 million)
2	KL Rahul	India	₹14 crore (US$1.5 million)
3	Kuldeep Yadav	India	₹13.25 crore (US$1.4 million)
4	Mitchell Starc	Australia	₹11.75 crore (US$1.2 million)
5	T. Natarajan	India	₹10.75 crore (US$1.1 million)
6	Tristan Stubbs	South Africa	₹10 crore (US$1.0 million)
7	Mukesh Kumar	India	₹8 crore (US$830,000)
8	Nitish Rana	India	₹4.2 crore (US$440,000)
9	Abhishek Porel	India	₹4 crore (US$420,000)
10	Ashutosh Sharma	India	₹3.8 crore (US$390,000)
11	Sameer Rizvi	India	₹95 lakh (US$99,000)
12	Dushmantha Chameera	Sri Lanka	₹75 lakh (US$78,000)
13	Karun Nair	India	₹50 lakh (US$52,000)
14	Madhav Tiwari	India	₹40 lakh (US$42,000)
15	Ajay Mandal	India	₹30 lakh (US$31,000)
16	Tripurana Vijay	India	₹30 lakh (US$31,000)
17	Vipraj Nigam	India	₹30 lakh (US$31,000)

Gujarat Titans
No.	Player	Nationality	Salary
1	Rashid Khan	Afghanistan	₹18 crore (US$1.9 million)
2	Shubman Gill	India	₹16.5 crore (US$1.7 million)
3	Jos Buttler	England	₹15.75 crore (US$1.6 million)
4	Mohammed Siraj	India	₹12.25 crore (US$1.3 million)
5	Kagiso Rabada	South Africa	₹10.75 crore (US$1.1 million)
6	Prasidh Krishna	India	₹9.5 crore (US$990,000)
7	Sai Sudharsan	India	₹8.5 crore (US$880,000)
8	Rahul Tewatia	India	₹4 crore (US$420,000)
9	Shahrukh Khan	India	₹4 crore (US$420,000)
10	Washington Sundar	India	₹3.2 crore (US$330,000)
11	Sai Kishore	India	₹2 crore (US$210,000)
12	Glenn Phillips	New Zealand	₹2 crore (US$210,000)
13	Arshad Khan	India	₹1.3 crore (US$130,000)
14	Gurnoor Brar	India	₹1.3 crore (US$130,000)
15	Ishant Sharma	India	₹75 lakh (US$78,000)
16	Jayant Yadav	India	₹75 lakh (US$78,000)
17	Kumar Kushagra	India	₹65 lakh (US$67,000)
18	Anuj Rawat	India	₹30 lakh (US$31,000)
19	Manav Suthar	India	₹30 lakh (US$31,000)
20	Nishant Sindhu	India	₹30 lakh (US$31,000)

Kolkata Knight Riders
No.	Player	Nationality	Salary
1	Rinku Singh	India	₹13 crore (US$1.3 million)
2	Sunil Narine	West Indies	₹12 crore (US$1.2 million)
3	Varun Chakravarthy	India	₹12 crore (US$1.2 million)
4	Harshit Rana	India	₹4 crore (US$420,000)
5	Ramandeep Singh	India	₹4 crore (US$420,000)
6	Angkrish Raghuvanshi	India	₹3 crore (US$310,000)
7	Vaibhav Arora	India	₹1.8 crore (US$190,000)
8	Ajinkya Rahane	India	₹1.5 crore (US$160,000)
9	Rovman Powell	West Indies	₹1.5 crore (US$160,000)
10	Manish Pandey	India	₹75 lakh (US$78,000)
11	Umran Malik	India	₹75 lakh (US$78,000)
12	Anukul Roy	India	₹40 lakh (US$42,000)

Lucknow Super Giants
No.	Player	Nationality	Salary
1	Rishabh Pant	India	₹27 crore (US$2.8 million)
2	Nicholas Pooran	West Indies	₹21 crore (US$2.2 million)
3	Mayank Yadav	India	₹11 crore (US$1.1 million)
4	Mohammed Shami	India	₹10 crore (US$1.0 million)
5	Avesh Khan	India	₹9.75 crore (US$1.0 million)
6	Abdul Samad	India	₹4.2 crore (US$440,000)
7	Ayush Badoni	India	₹4 crore (US$420,000)
8	Mohsin Khan	India	₹4 crore (US$420,000)
9	Mitchell Marsh	Australia	₹3.4 crore (US$350,000)
10	Shahbaz Ahmed	India	₹2.4 crore (US$250,000)
11	Aiden Markram	South Africa	₹2 crore (US$210,000)
12	Manimaran Siddharth	India	₹75 lakh (US$78,000)
13	Matthew Breetzke	South Africa	₹75 lakh (US$78,000)
14	Akash Singh	India	₹30 lakh (US$31,000)
15	Arjun Tendulkar	India	₹30 lakh (US$31,000)
16	Arshin Kulkarni	India	₹30 lakh (US$31,000)
17	Himmat Singh	India	₹30 lakh (US$31,000)
18	Digvesh Rathi	India	₹30 lakh (US$31,000)
19	Prince Yadav	India	₹30 lakh (US$31,000)

Mumbai Indians
No.	Player	Nationality	Salary
1	Jasprit Bumrah	India	₹18 crore (US$1.9 million)
2	Hardik Pandya	India	₹16.35 crore (US$1.7 million)
3	Suryakumar Yadav	India	₹16.35 crore (US$1.7 million)
4	Rohit Sharma	India	₹16.30 crore (US$1.7 million)
5	Trent Boult	New Zealand	₹12.5 crore (US$1.3 million)
6	Deepak Chahar	India	₹9.25 crore (US$960,000)
7	Tilak Varma	India	₹8 crore (US$830,000)
8	Will Jacks	England	₹5.25 crore (US$550,000)
9	Naman Dhir	India	₹5.25 crore (US$550,000)
10	Allah Ghazanfar	Afghanistan	₹4.8 crore (US$500,000)
11	Sherfane Rutherford	West Indies	₹2.6 crore (US$270,000)
12	Shardul Thakur	India	₹2 crore (US$210,000)
13	Mitchell Santner	New Zealand	₹2 crore (US$210,000)
14	Ryan Rickelton	South Africa	₹1 crore (US$100,000)
15	Corbin Bosch	South Africa	₹75 lakh (US$78,000)
16	Robin Minz	India	₹65 lakh (US$67,000)
17	Raj Angad Bawa	India	₹30 lakh (US$31,000)
18	Ashwani Kumar	India	₹30 lakh (US$31,000)
19	Raghu Sharma	India	₹30 lakh (US$31,000)
20	Mayank Markande	India	₹30 lakh (US$31,000)

Punjab Kings
No.	Player	Nationality	Salary
1	Shreyas Iyer	India	₹26.75 crore (US$2.8 million)
2	Arshdeep Singh	India	₹18 crore (US$1.9 million)
3	Yuzvendra Chahal	India	₹18 crore (US$1.9 million)
4	Marcus Stoinis	Australia	₹11 crore (US$1.1 million)
5	Marco Jansen	South Africa	₹7 crore (US$730,000)
6	Shashank Singh	India	₹5.5 crore (US$570,000)
7	Nehal Wadhera	India	₹4.2 crore (US$440,000)
8	Prabhsimran Singh	India	₹4 crore (US$420,000)
9	Priyansh Arya	India	₹3.8 crore (US$390,000)
10	Mitchell Owen	Australia	₹3 crore (US$310,000)
11	Azmatullah Omarzai	Afghanistan	₹2.4 crore (US$250,000)
12	Lockie Ferguson	New Zealand	₹2 crore (US$210,000)
13	Vijaykumar Vyshak	India	₹1.8 crore (US$190,000)
14	Yash Thakur	India	₹1.6 crore (US$170,000)
15	Harpreet Brar	India	₹1.5 crore (US$160,000)
16	Vishnu Vinod	India	₹95 lakh (US$99,000)
17	Xavier Bartlett	Australia	₹80 lakh (US$83,000)
18	Pyla Avinash	India	₹30 lakh (US$31,000)
19	Harnoor Pannu	India	₹30 lakh (US$31,000)
20	Musheer Khan	India	₹30 lakh (US$31,000)
21	Suryansh Shedge	India	₹30 lakh (US$31,000)

Rajasthan Royals
No.	Player	Nationality	Salary
1	Yashasvi Jaiswal	India	₹18 crore (US$1.9 million)
2	Riyan Parag	India	₹14 crore (US$1.5 million)
3	Ravindra Jadeja	India	₹14 crore (US$1.5 million)
4	Dhruv Jurel	India	₹14 crore (US$1.5 million)
5	Jofra Archer	England	₹12.50 crore (US$1.3 million)
6	Shimron Hetmyer	West Indies	₹11 crore (US$1.1 million)
7	Tushar Deshpande	India	₹6.5 crore (US$670,000)
8	Sandeep Sharma	India	₹4 crore (US$420,000)
9	Nandre Burger	South Africa	₹3.5 crore (US$360,000)
10	Sam Curran	England	₹2.4 crore (US$250,000)
11	Kwena Maphaka	South Africa	₹1.5 crore (US$160,000)
12	Vaibhav Sooryavanshi	India	₹1.1 crore (US$110,000)
13	Donovan Ferreira	South Africa	₹1 crore (US$100,000)
14	Shubham Dubey	India	₹80 lakh (US$83,000)
15	Yudhvir Singh	India	₹35 lakh (US$36,000)
16	Lhuan-dre Pretorius	South Africa	₹30 lakh (US$31,000)

Royal Challengers Bengaluru
No.	Player	Nationality	Salary
1	Virat Kohli	India	₹21 crore (US$2.2 million)
2	Josh Hazlewood	Australia	₹12.5 crore (US$1.3 million)
3	Phil Salt	England	₹11.5 crore (US$1.2 million)
4	Rajat Patidar	India	₹11 crore (US$1.1 million)
5	Jitesh Sharma	India	₹11 crore (US$1.1 million)
6	Bhuvneshwar Kumar	India	₹10.75 crore (US$1.1 million)
7	Rasikh Salam	India	₹6 crore (US$620,000)
8	Krunal Pandya	India	₹5.75 crore (US$600,000)
9	Yash Dayal	India	₹5 crore (US$520,000)
10	Tim David	Australia	₹3 crore (US$310,000)
11	Suyash Sharma	India	₹2.6 crore (US$270,000)
12	Jacob Bethell	England	₹2.6 crore (US$270,000)
13	Devdutt Padikkal	India	₹2 crore (US$210,000)
14	Nuwan Thushara	Sri Lanka	₹1.6 crore (US$170,000)
15	Romario Shepherd	West Indies	₹1.5 crore (US$160,000)
16	Swapnil Singh	India	₹50 lakh (US$52,000)
17	Abhinandan Singh	India	₹30 lakh (US$31,000)

Sunrisers Hyderabad
No.	Player	Nationality	Salary
1	Heinrich Klaasen	South Africa	₹23 crore (US$2.4 million)
2	Pat Cummins	Australia	₹18 crore (US$1.9 million)
3	Travis Head	Australia	₹14 crore (US$1.5 million)
4	Abhishek Sharma	India	₹14 crore (US$1.5 million)
5	Ishan Kishan	India	₹11.25 crore (US$1.2 million)
6	Harshal Patel	India	₹8 crore (US$830,000)
7	Nitish Kumar Reddy	India	₹6 crore (US$620,000)
8	Eshan Malinga	Sri Lanka	₹1.2 crore (US$120,000)
9	Brydon Carse	England	₹1 crore (US$100,000)
10	Jaydev Unadkat	India	₹1 crore (US$100,000)
11	Kamindu Mendis	Sri Lanka	₹75 lakh (US$78,000)
12	Zeeshan Ansari	India	₹40 lakh (US$42,000)
13	Smaran Ravichandran	India	₹30 lakh (US$31,000)
14	Aniket Verma	India	₹30 lakh (US$31,000)
15	Harsh Dubey	India	₹30 lakh (US$31,000)

== Auction ==
Any player willing to play in the IPL was required to register for the auction. Players who did not register for the 2025 mega auction are ineligible to participate in the mini-auctions held in the subsequent years. Any auctioned player who withdrew before the 2025 season without legitimate reason or injury is banned from the IPL for a period of two years.

The auction was held on 16 December 2025 in Abu Dhabi, United Arab Emirates. Mallika Sagar was appointed as the auctioneer for the third consecutive year, after she hosted the 2024 and 2025 auctions. A total of 1,355 players registered for the auction, of which 369 players were shortlisted and 156 were featured in the auction and 77 were sold in the auction.

=== Summary ===
Summary by teams
Team	Retained			Bought			Overall		
Team	Capped	Uncapped	Total	Capped	Uncapped	Total	Capped	Uncapped	Total
Chennai Super Kings	6	10	16	6	3	9	12	13	25
Delhi Capitals	10	7	17	6	2	8	16	9	25
Gujarat Titans	12	8	20	3	2	5	15	10	25
Kolkata Knight Riders	6	6	12	8	5	13	14	11	25
Lucknow Super Giants	10	9	19	3	3	6	13	12	25
Mumbai Indians	13	7	20	1	4	5	14	11	25
Punjab Kings	11	10	21	2	2	4	13	12	25
Rajasthan Royals	9	7	16	3	6	9	12	13	25
Royal Challengers Bengaluru	9	8	17	3	5	8	12	13	25
Sunrisers Hyderabad	9	6	15	2	8	10	11	14	25
Total	95	78	173	37	40	77	132	118	250

=== Sold players ===
Ten sets of players were divided based on their specialisation: batters, all-rounders, wicket keeper batters, fast bowlers and spin bowlers; and status: capped and uncapped. The capped players went up for bidding first followed by the uncapped players. After player no. 70, the auction entered its accelerated phase, covering all the remaining players. During the accelerated round, players were presented based on the franchises' preference.

- Sources: Cricinfo, Olympics.com

Set 1: capped batters (BA1)
No.	Name	Country	No. of IPL matches	Base price (₹ lakhs)	2026 IPL team	Auctioned price (₹ lakhs)	2025 IPL team
3	Cameron Green	Australia	29	200	Kolkata Knight Riders	2520	—N/a
4	Sarfaraz Khan	India	50	75	Chennai Super Kings	75	—N/a
5	David Miller	South Africa	141	200	Delhi Capitals	200	Lucknow Super Giants
6	Prithvi Shaw	India	79	75	Delhi Capitals	75	—N/a

Set 2: capped all-rounders (AL1)
No.	Name	Country	No. of IPL matches	Base price (₹ lakhs)	2026 IPL team	Auctioned price (₹ lakhs)	2025 IPL team
8	Wanindu Hasaranga	Sri Lanka	37	200	Lucknow Super Giants	200	Rajasthan Royals
10	Venkatesh Iyer	India	62	200	Royal Challengers Bengaluru	700	Kolkata Knight Riders
11	Liam Livingstone	England	49	200	Sunrisers Hyderabad	1300	Royal Challengers Bengaluru
13	Rachin Ravindra	New Zealand	18	200	Kolkata Knight Riders	200	Chennai Super Kings

Set 3: capped wicket-keepers (WK1)
No.	Name	Country	No. of IPL matches	Base price (₹ lakhs)	2026 IPL team	Auctioned price (₹ lakhs)	2025 IPL team
14	Finn Allen	New Zealand	0	200	Kolkata Knight Riders	200	—N/a
17	Quinton de Kock	South Africa	115	100	Mumbai Indians	100	Kolkata Knight Riders
18	Ben Duckett	England	—N/a	200	Delhi Capitals	200	—N/a

Set 4: capped fast bowlers (FA1)
No.	Name	Country	No. of IPL matches	Base price (₹ lakhs)	2026 IPL team	Auctioned price (₹ lakhs)	2025 IPL team
22	Akash Deep	India	14	100	Kolkata Knight Riders	100	Lucknow Super Giants
23	Jacob Duffy	New Zealand	—N/a	200	Royal Challengers Bengaluru	200	—N/a
25	Matt Henry	New Zealand	6	200	Chennai Super Kings	200	—N/a
27	Shivam Mavi	India	32	75	Sunrisers Hyderabad	75	—N/a
28	Anrich Nortje	South Africa	48	200	Lucknow Super Giants	200	Kolkata Knight Riders
29	Matheesha Pathirana	Sri Lanka	32	200	Kolkata Knight Riders	1800	Chennai Super Kings

Set 5: capped spin bowlers (SP1)
No.	Name	Country	No. of IPL matches	Base price (₹ lakhs)	2026 IPL team	Auctioned price (₹ lakhs)	2025 IPL team
30	Ravi Bishnoi	India	77	200	Rajasthan Royals	720	Lucknow Super Giants
31	Rahul Chahar	India	80	100	Chennai Super Kings	520	Sunrisers Hyderabad
32	Akeal Hosein	West Indies	1	200	Chennai Super Kings	200	—N/a

Set 7: uncapped all-rounders (UAL1)
No.	Name	Country	No. of IPL matches	Base price (₹ lakhs)	2026 IPL team	Auctioned price (₹ lakhs)	2025 IPL team
41	Auqib Nabi	India	0	30	Delhi Capitals	840	—N/a
44	Shivang Kumar	India	0	30	Sunrisers Hyderabad	30	—N/a
50	Prashant Veer	India	0	30	Chennai Super Kings	1420	—N/a

Set 8: uncapped wicket-keepers (UWK1)
No.	Name	Country	No. of IPL matches	Base price (₹ lakhs)	2026 IPL team	Auctioned price (₹ lakhs)	2025 IPL team
53	Mukul Choudhary	India	—N/a	30	Lucknow Super Giants	260	—N/a
55	Kartik Sharma	India	—N/a	30	Chennai Super Kings	1420	—N/a
56	Tejasvi Singh	India	—N/a	30	Kolkata Knight Riders	300	—N/a

Set 9: uncapped fast bowlers (UFA1)
No.	Name	Country	No. of IPL matches	Base price (₹ lakhs)	2026 IPL team	Auctioned price (₹ lakhs)	2025 IPL team
59	Sushant Mishra	India	—N/a	30	Rajasthan Royals	90	—N/a
60	Ashok Sharma	India	—N/a	30	Gujarat Titans	90	Rajasthan Royals
62	Naman Tiwari	India	—N/a	30	Lucknow Super Giants	100	—N/a
63	Kartik Tyagi	India	20	30	Kolkata Knight Riders	30	—N/a

Set 10: uncapped spin bowlers (USP1)
No.	Name	Country	No. of IPL matches	Base price (₹ lakhs)	2026 IPL team	Auctioned price (₹ lakhs)	2025 IPL team
64	Yash Raj Punja	India	—N/a	30	Rajasthan Royals	30	—N/a
65	Vignesh Puthur	India	5	30	Rajasthan Royals	30	Mumbai Indians
69	Prashant Solanki	India	2	30	Kolkata Knight Riders	30	—N/a

Accelerated round
No.	Name	Country	Role	No. of IPL matches	Category	Base price (₹ lakhs)	2026 IPL team	Auctioned price (₹ lakhs)	2025 IPL team
75	Pathum Nissanka	Sri Lanka	Batter	—N/a	Capped	75	Delhi Capitals	400	—N/a
78	Rahul Tripathi	India	Batter	100	Capped	75	Kolkata Knight Riders	75	Chennai Super Kings
81	Ben Dwarshuis	Australia	All-rounder	—N/a	Capped	100	Punjab Kings	440	—N/a
82	Zak Foulkes	New Zealand	All-rounder	—N/a	Capped	75	Chennai Super Kings	75	—N/a
83	Jason Holder	West Indies	All-rounder	46	Capped	200	Gujarat Titans	700	—N/a
87	Matthew Short	Australia	All-rounder	6	Capped	150	Chennai Super Kings	150	—N/a
88	Tom Banton	England	Wicket-keeper	2	Capped	200	Gujarat Titans	200	—N/a
89	Jordan Cox	England	Wicket-keeper	—N/a	Capped	75	Royal Challengers Bengaluru	75	—N/a
91	Josh Inglis	Australia	Wicket-keeper	11	Capped	200	Lucknow Super Giants	860	Punjab Kings
95	Tim Seifert	New Zealand	Wicket-keeper	3	Capped	150	Kolkata Knight Riders	150	Royal Challengers Bengaluru
96	Kyle Jamieson	New Zealand	Bowler	13	Capped	200	Delhi Capitals	200	Punjab Kings
98	Adam Milne	New Zealand	Bowler	10	Capped	200	Rajasthan Royals	240	—N/a
99	Lungi Ngidi	South Africa	Bowler	16	Capped	200	Delhi Capitals	200	Royal Challengers Bengaluru
101	Mustafizur Rahman	Bangladesh	Bowler	60	Capped	200	Kolkata Knight Riders	920	Delhi Capitals
103	Kuldeep Sen	India	Bowler	12	Capped	75	Rajasthan Royals	75	Punjab Kings
111	Danish Malewar	India	Batter	—N/a	Uncapped	30	Mumbai Indians	30	—N/a
114	Aman Rao	India	Batter	—N/a	Uncapped	30	Rajasthan Royals	30	—N/a
115	Akshat Raghuwanshi	India	Batter	—N/a	Uncapped	30	Lucknow Super Giants	220	—N/a
118	Satvik Deswal	India	All-rounder	—N/a	Uncapped	30	Royal Challengers Bengaluru	30	—N/a
119	Aman Khan	India	All-rounder	12	Uncapped	30	Chennai Super Kings	40	—N/a
121	Vicky Ostwal	India	All-rounder	—N/a	Uncapped	30	Royal Challengers Bengaluru	30	—N/a
124	Mayank Rawat	India	All-rounder	—N/a	Uncapped	30	Mumbai Indians	30	—N/a
126	Mangesh Yadav	India	All-rounder	—N/a	Uncapped	30	Royal Challengers Bengaluru	520	—N/a
127	Salil Arora	India	Wicket-keeper	—N/a	Uncapped	30	Sunrisers Hyderabad	150	—N/a
134	Ravi Singh	India	Wicket-keeper	—N/a	Uncapped	30	Rajasthan Royals	95	—N/a
136	Sakib Hussain	India	Bowler	—N/a	Uncapped	30	Sunrisers Hyderabad	30	—N/a
137	Mohammad Izhar	India	Bowler	—N/a	Uncapped	30	Mumbai Indians	30	—N/a
142	Onkar Tarmale	India	Bowler	—N/a	Uncapped	30	Sunrisers Hyderabad	30	—N/a
143	Prithvi Raj	India	Bowler	2	Uncapped	30	Gujarat Titans	30	—N/a
149	Praveen Dubey	India	Bowler	5	Uncapped	30	Punjab Kings	30	Punjab Kings
154	Cooper Connolly	Australia	All-rounder	—N/a	Capped	200	Punjab Kings	300	—N/a
170	Luke Wood	England	Bowler	2	Capped	75	Gujarat Titans	75	—N/a
176	Sahil Parekh	India	Batter	—N/a	Uncapped	30	Delhi Capitals	30	—N/a
211	Amit Kumar	India	Bowler	—N/a	Uncapped	30	Sunrisers Hyderabad	30	—N/a
212	Vishal Nishad	India	All-rounder	—N/a	Uncapped	30	Punjab Kings	30	—N/a
239	Atharva Ankolekar	India	All-rounder	—N/a	Uncapped	30	Mumbai Indians	30	—N/a
251	Praful Hinge	India	Bowler	—N/a	Uncapped	30	Sunrisers Hyderabad	30	—N/a
275	Krains Fuletra	India	All-rounder	—N/a	Uncapped	30	Sunrisers Hyderabad	30	—N/a
295	Vihaan Malhotra	India	All-rounder	—N/a	Uncapped	30	Royal Challengers Bengaluru	30	—N/a
299	Sarthak Ranjan	India	All-rounder	—N/a	Uncapped	30	Kolkata Knight Riders	30	—N/a
309	Brijesh Sharma	India	Bowler	—N/a	Uncapped	30	Rajasthan Royals	30	—N/a
313	Kanishk Chouhan	India	All-rounder	—N/a	Uncapped	30	Royal Challengers Bengaluru	30	—N/a
322	Daksh Kamra	India	All-rounder	—N/a	Uncapped	30	Kolkata Knight Riders	30	—N/a
346	Jack Edwards	Australia	All-rounder	—N/a	Uncapped	50	Sunrisers Hyderabad	300	—N/a

== Support staff changes ==
Support staff changes for the 2026 Indian Premier League
Team	Position	Outgoing	Incoming	Ref.
Chennai Super Kings	Bowling coach	—N/a	Sridharan Sriram	
Delhi Capitals	Assistant coach	Matthew Mott	Ian Bell	
Gujarat Titans	Assistant coach	Matthew Wade	Aashish Kapoor; Vijay Dahiya	
Gujarat Titans	Batting coach	—N/a	Matthew Hayden	
Kolkata Knight Riders	Head coach	Chandrakant Pandit	Abhishek Nayar	
Kolkata Knight Riders	Assistant coach	Ottis Gibson	Shane Watson	
Kolkata Knight Riders	Bowling coach	Bharat Arun; Carl Crowe	Tim Southee	
Kolkata Knight Riders	Fielding coach	—N/a	Dishant Yagnik	
Lucknow Super Giants	Assistant coach	Vijay Dahiya	—N/a	
Lucknow Super Giants	Batting coach	—N/a	Matthew Mott	
Lucknow Super Giants	Bowling coach	—N/a	Bharat Arun; Carl Crowe	
Lucknow Super Giants	Fielding coach	Jonty Rhodes	Abhay Sharma	
Lucknow Super Giants	Mentor	Zaheer Khan	—N/a	
Punjab Kings	Bowling coach	Sunil Joshi	Sairaj Bahutule	
Rajasthan Royals	Head coach	Rahul Dravid	Kumar Sangakkara	
Rajasthan Royals	Assistant coach	—N/a	Trevor Penney	
Rajasthan Royals	Bowling coach	Sairaj Bahutule	Shane Bond	
Sunrisers Hyderabad	Assistant coach	—N/a	Simon Helmot	
Sunrisers Hyderabad	Batting coach	—N/a	Hariesh Jaikumar	
Sunrisers Hyderabad	Bowling coach	James Franklin	Varun Aaron	

== Withdrawn players ==
The following players were ruled out and/or unavailable for the rest of the season due to either injury or national duties. The franchises were allowed to pick a replacement player from the unsold players at the auction to replace the withdrawn players.

Withdrawn players from the 2026 Indian Premier League
Player	Team	Auctioned/retention price	Reason	Withdrawal announcement date	Replacement player	Replacement player's price	Signing date	Ref.
Mustafizur Rahman	Kolkata Knight Riders	₹9.2 crore (US$960,000)	BCCI request	3 January 2026	Blessing Muzarabani	₹75 lakh (US$78,000)	13 March 2026	
Atharva Ankolekar	Mumbai Indians	₹30 lakh (US$31,000)	Knee injury	1 March 2026	Krish Bhagat	₹30 lakh (US$31,000)	16 April 2026	
Harshit Rana	Kolkata Knight Riders	₹4 crore (US$420,000)	Knee injury	13 March 2026	Navdeep Saini	₹75 lakh (US$78,000)	25 March 2026	
Nathan Ellis	Chennai Super Kings	₹2 crore (US$210,000)	Hamstring injury	19 March 2026	Spencer Johnson	₹1.5 crore (US$160,000)	24 March 2026	
Sam Curran	Rajasthan Royals	₹2.4 crore (US$250,000)	Groin injury	19 March 2026	Dasun Shanaka	₹2 crore (US$210,000)	22 March 2026	
Jack Edwards	Sunrisers Hyderabad	₹3 crore (US$310,000)	Foot injury	19 March 2026	David Payne	₹1.5 crore (US$160,000)	24 March 2026	
Akash Deep	Kolkata Knight Riders	₹1 crore (US$100,000)	Lower-back injury	21 March 2026	Saurabh Dubey	₹30 lakh (US$31,000)	22 March 2026	
Yash Dayal	Royal Challengers Bengaluru	₹5 crore (US$520,000)	Personal reasons	24 March 2026	—N/a			
Ben Duckett	Delhi Capitals	₹2 crore (US$210,000)	Personal reasons	24 March 2026	Rehan Ahmed	₹75 lakh (US$78,000)	23 April 2026	
Prithvi Raj Yarra	Gujarat Titans	₹30 lakh (US$31,000)	Injury	25 March 2026	Kulwant Khejroliya	₹30 lakh (US$31,000)	25 March 2026	
Wanindu Hasaranga	Lucknow Super Giants	₹2 crore (US$210,000)	NOC denied	9 April 2026	George Linde	₹1 crore (US$100,000)	10 April 2026	
Brydon Carse	Sunrisers Hyderabad	₹1 crore (US$100,000)	Injury	14 April 2026	Dilshan Madushanka	₹75 lakh (US$78,000)	14 April 2026	
Khaleel Ahmed	Chennai Super Kings	₹4.8 crore (US$500,000)	Quadriceps injury	16 April 2026	Kuldip Yadav	₹30 lakh (US$31,000)	15 May 2026	
David Payne	Sunrisers Hyderabad	₹1.5 crore (US$160,000)	Ankle injury	16 April 2026	Gerald Coetzee	₹2 crore (US$210,000)	18 April 2026	
Tom Banton	Gujarat Titans	₹2 crore (US$210,000)	Finger injury	18 April 2026	Connor Esterhuizen	₹75 lakh (US$78,000)	18 April 2026	
Ayush Mhatre	Chennai Super Kings	₹30 lakh (US$31,000)	Hamstring injury	21 April 2026	Akash Madhwal	₹30 lakh (US$31,000)	23 April 2026	
Mitchell Santner	Mumbai Indians	₹2 crore (US$210,000)	Shoulder injury	27 April 2026	Keshav Maharaj	₹75 lakh (US$78,000)	27 April 2026	
Shivam Mavi	Sunrisers Hyderabad	₹45 lakh (US$47,000)	Groin injury	1 May 2026	RS Ambrish	₹45 lakh (US$47,000)	1 May 2026	
Ramakrishna Ghosh	Chennai Super Kings	₹30 lakh (US$31,000)	Foot fracture	3 May 2026	Macneil Noronha	₹30 lakh (US$31,000)	12 May 2026	
Jamie Overton	Chennai Super Kings	₹1.5 crore (US$160,000)	Thigh injury	14 May 2026	Dian Forrester	₹75 lakh (US$78,000)	14 May 2026	
Nuwan Thushara	Royal Challengers Bengaluru	₹1.6 crore (US$170,000)	NOC denied	15 May 2026	Richard Gleeson	₹1.6 crore (US$170,000)	15 May 2026	
Quinton de Kock	Mumbai Indians	₹1 crore (US$100,000)	Wrist injury	19 May 2026	Mahipal Lomror	₹50 lakh (US$52,000)	23 May 2026	
Raj Angad Bawa	Mumbai Indians	₹30 lakh (US$31,000)	Ligament tear	19 May 2026	Ruchit Ahir	₹30 lakh (US$31,000)	23 May 2026	
Ravi Singh	Rajasthan Royals	₹95 lakh (US$99,000)	Hamstring injury	23 May 2026	Emanjot Chahal	₹30 lakh (US$31,000)	23 May 2026	
Mitchell Marsh	Lucknow Super Giants	₹3.4 crore (US$350,000)	National duty	23 May 2026	—N/a			
Matheesha Pathirana	Kolkata Knight Riders	₹18 crore (US$1.9 million)	Hamstring injury	24 May 2026	Luvnith Sisodia	₹30 lakh (US$31,000)	24 May 2026	
Jacob Bethell	Royal Challengers Bengaluru	₹2.6 crore (US$270,000)	Finger injury	24 May 2026	—N/a			
