= 2026 Lucknow Super Giants season =

Indian Premier League cricket team

Lucknow Super Giants
2026 season
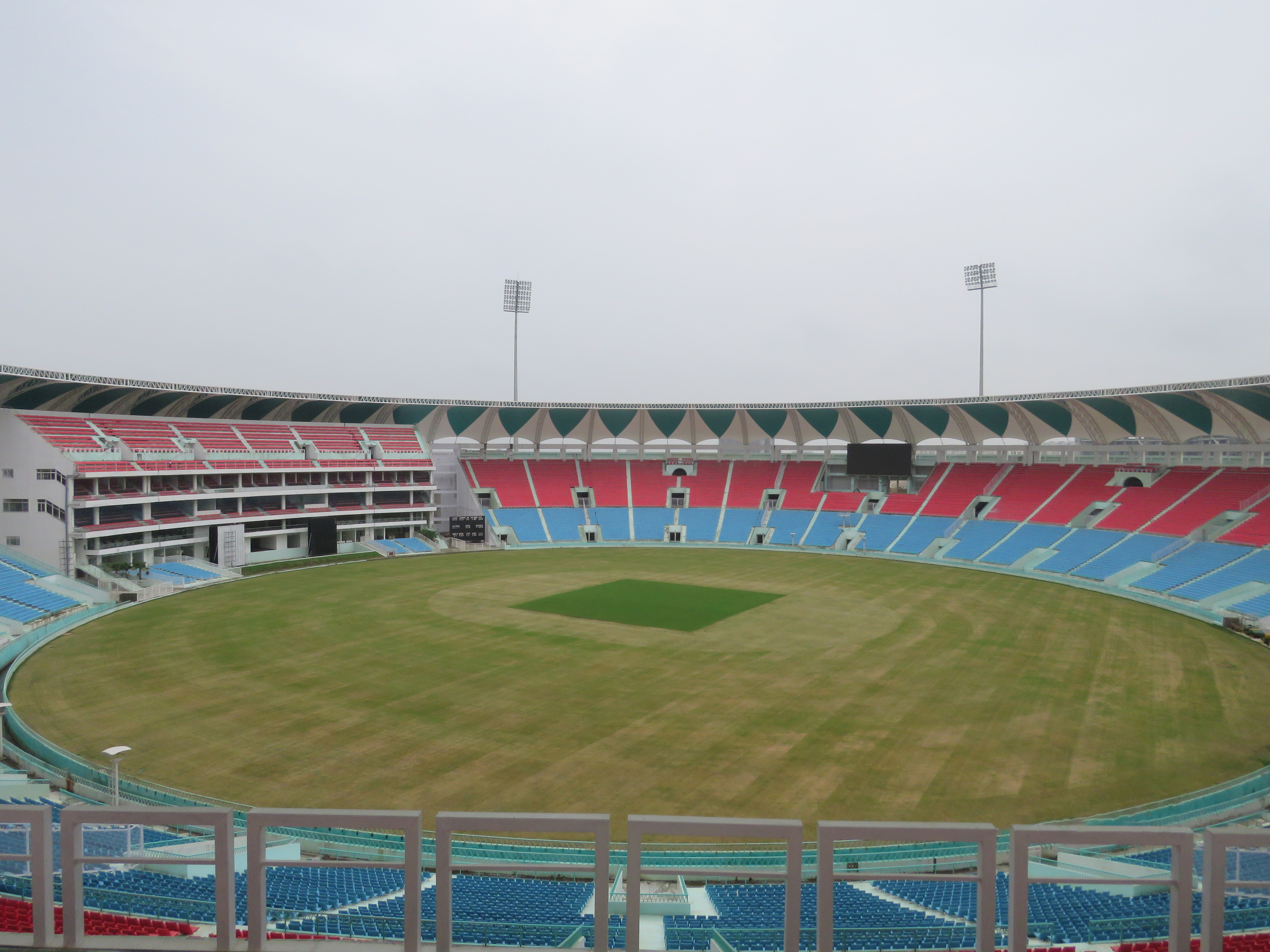
- Ekana Cricket Stadium, home ground of Lucknow Super Giants
- Coach: Justin Langer
- Captain: Rishabh Pant
- Ground(s): Ekana Cricket Stadium, Lucknow
- League stage: 10th place
- Most runs: Mitchell Marsh (563)
- Most wickets: Prince Yadav (16)
- Most catches: Aiden Markram (8)
- Most wicket-keeping dismissals: Rishabh Pant (10)

The 2026 season was Lucknow Super Giants' fifth appearance in the Indian Premier League (IPL). They were one of the ten cricket teams that competed in the 2026 IPL. Rishabh Pant captained the team, and Justin Langer coached it.

Lucknow Super Giants were the first team eliminated from the 2026 IPL and finished the season last (tenth) with four wins from 14 matches. Mitchell Marsh scored the most runs (563) while Prince Yadav took the most wickets (16) for Lucknow in the 2026 season.

== Pre-season ==
The 2026 Indian Premier League was the 19th edition of the Indian Premier League (IPL), a professional Twenty20 (T20) cricket league held in India and organised by the Board of Control for Cricket in India (BCCI). Lucknow Super Giants are one of the three active franchises to not have won the IPL title yet. The team finished in seventh place in the previous season. The tournament featured ten teams competing in 74 matches from 28 March to 31 May 2026. Lucknow played all their home matches at Ekana Cricket Stadium.

=== Player retention ===
Franchises were allowed to retain any number of players from their squad, including traded players while excluding players signed as temporary replacements. Franchises were required to submit their retention lists before 15 November 2025. Lucknow retained nineteen players, including captain Rishabh Pant. Lucknow traded in Mohammed Shami from Sunrisers Hyderabad and Arjun Tendulkar from Mumbai Indians. Lucknow also traded Shardul Thakur to Mumbai.

Retained players
Domestic		Overseas
Shahbaz Ahmed; Ayush Badoni; Avesh Khan; Mohsin Khan; Arshin Kulkarni; Rishabh Pant; Digvesh Rathi; Abdul Samad	Mohammed Shami (Note: Sunrisers Hyderabad traded Mohammed Shami to Lucknow Super Giants.); Manimaran Siddharth; Akash Singh; Himmat Singh; Arjun Tendulkar (Note: Mumbai Indians traded Arjun Tendulkar to Lucknow Super Giants.); Mayank Yadav; Prince Yadav	Matthew Breetzke; Aiden Markram; Mitchell Marsh; Nicholas Pooran

Released players
Batters	Wicket-keepers	All-rounders	Bowlers
David Miller	Aryan Juyal	Yuvraj Chaudhary; Rajvardhan Hangargekar; Shardul Thakur (Note: Lucknow Super Giants traded Shardul Thakur to Mumbai Indians.)	Ravi Bishnoi; Akash Deep; Shamar Joseph; Will O'Rourke

=== Auction ===
The season's auction took place on 16 December 2025 in Abu Dhabi, United Arab Emirates. The auction purse for each franchise was set at ₹125 crore (US$13 million), with franchises being deducted an amount from the purse for every retained player. Lucknow had a purse remaining of ₹22.95 crore (US$2.5 million). Lucknow bought six players in the auction, including three capped overseas players.

Auctioned players
Domestic		Overseas	
Capped	Uncapped	Capped	Uncapped
—N/a	Mukul Choudhary; Naman Tiwari; Akshat Raghuwanshi	Wanindu Hasaranga; Anrich Nortje; Josh Inglis	—N/a

== Squad ==
- Players with international caps as of the start of the 2026 IPL are listed in **bold**.
- Ages are as of 28 March 2026.
- Withdrawn players are indicated by a dagger symbol (†) and placed at the bottom of the table.

Lucknow Super Giants squad for the 2026 Indian Premier League
S/N	Name	Nationality	Birth date	Batting style	Bowling style	Salary	Notes
1	Abdul Samad	India	28 October 2001 (aged 24)	Right-handed	Right-arm leg break	₹4.2 crore (US$450,000)	
3	Ayush Badoni	India	3 December 1999 (aged 26)	Right-handed	Right-arm off break	₹4 crore (US$430,000)	
6	**Avesh Khan**	India	13 December 1996 (aged 29)	Right-handed	Right-arm medium-fast	₹9.75 crore (US$1.0 million)	
11	**Mohammed Shami**	India	3 September 1990 (aged 35)	Right-handed	Right-arm fast	₹10 crore (US$1.1 million)	
17	**Rishabh Pant**	India	4 October 1997 (aged 28)	Left-handed	—N/a	₹27 crore (US$2.9 million)	Captain
18	**Matthew Breetzke**	South Africa	3 November 1998 (aged 27)	Right-handed	Right-arm medium	₹75 lakh (US$80,000)	Overseas
20	**Anrich Nortje**	South Africa	16 November 1993 (aged 32)	Right-handed	Right-arm fast	₹2 crore (US$210,000)	Overseas
21	**Shahbaz Ahmed**	India	11 December 1994 (aged 31)	Left-handed	Left-arm orthodox	₹2.4 crore (US$260,000)	
24	Arjun Tendulkar	India	24 September 1999 (aged 26)	Left-handed	Left-arm medium-fast	₹30 lakh (US$32,000)	
25	Prince Yadav	India	12 December 2001 (aged 24)	Right-handed	Right-arm medium-fast	₹30 lakh (US$32,000)	
29	**Nicholas Pooran**	West Indies	2 October 1995 (aged 30)	Left-handed	—N/a	₹21 crore (US$2.2 million)	Overseas
30	Manimaran Siddharth	India	3 July 1998 (aged 27)	Right-handed	Left-arm orthodox	₹75 lakh (US$80,000)	
33	Arshin Kulkarni	India	15 February 2005 (aged 21)	Right-handed	Right-arm medium-fast	₹30 lakh (US$32,000)	
36	Naman Tiwari	India	8 November 2005 (aged 20)	Left-handed	Left-arm medium-fast	₹1 crore (US$110,000)	
44	**Mayank Yadav**	India	17 June 2002 (aged 23)	Right-handed	Right-arm medium-fast	₹11 crore (US$1.2 million)	
45	Akshat Raghuwanshi	India	15 September 2003 (aged 22)	Right-handed	Right-arm off break	₹2.2 crore (US$240,000)	
47	Mohsin Khan	India	15 July 1998 (aged 27)	Left-handed	Left-arm medium-fast	₹4 crore (US$430,000)	
69	Himmat Singh	India	8 November 1996 (aged 29)	Right-handed	Right-arm off break	₹30 lakh (US$32,000)	
72	Akash Singh	India	26 April 2002 (aged 23)	Right-handed	Left-arm medium-fast	₹30 lakh (US$32,000)	
74	Digvesh Rathi	India	15 December 1999 (aged 26)	Right-handed	Right-arm leg break	₹30 lakh (US$32,000)	
94	**Aiden Markram**	South Africa	4 October 1994 (aged 31)	Right-handed	Right-arm off break	₹2 crore (US$210,000)	Overseas
95	**Josh Inglis**	Australia	4 March 1995 (aged 31)	Right-handed	—N/a	₹8.6 crore (US$920,000)	Overseas
—N/a	Mukul Choudhary	India	6 August 2004 (aged 21)	Right-handed	—N/a	₹2.6 crore (US$280,000)	
—N/a	**George Linde**	South Africa	4 December 1991 (aged 34)	Left-handed	Left-arm orthodox	₹1 crore (US$110,000)	Overseas; replacement (Note: George Linde replaced Wanindu Hasaranga, after the latter withdrew due to NOC denied.)
8	**Mitchell Marsh** †	Australia	20 October 1991 (aged 34)	Right-handed	Right-arm medium-fast	₹3.4 crore (US$360,000)	Overseas; withdrawn (Note: Mitchell Marsh withdrew due to national duty.)
49	**Wanindu Hasaranga** †	Sri Lanka	29 July 1997 (aged 28)	Right-handed	Right-arm leg break	₹2 crore (US$210,000)	Overseas; withdrawn

== Support staff ==
Abhay Sharma replaced Jonty Rhodes as the fielding coach while Matthew Mott joined as the batting coach and Bharat Arun and Carl Crowe joined as bowling coaches. Vijay Dahiya and Zaheer Khan left the squad from their roles.

Position	Name
Head coach	Justin Langer
Assistant coach	Lance Klusener
Batting coach	Matthew Mott
Bowling coach	Bharat Arun; Carl Crowe
Fielding coach	Abhay Sharma

- Source: News18

== League stage ==
Lucknow Super Giants began their season with a loss to Delhi Capitals and two wins against Hyderabad and Kolkata Knight Riders. They lost their next 6 matches to Gujarat Titans, Royal Challengers Bengaluru, Punjab Kings, Rajasthan Royals, Kolkata and Mumbai. They won their next match against Bengaluru but lost to Chennai Super Kings and were eliminated from the 2026 season. They won their next match against Chennai but lost their last two matches of the season to Rajasthan and Punjab to finish the league stage at the last place with eight points.

=== Points table ===
League stage standings
Pos	Grp	Team	Pld	W	L	NR	Pts	NRR	Qualification
1	A	Royal Challengers Bengaluru (C)	14	9	5	0	18	0.783	Advanced to Qualifier 1
2	B	Gujarat Titans (R)	14	9	5	0	18	0.695	Advanced to Qualifier 1
3	B	Sunrisers Hyderabad (4th)	14	9	5	0	18	0.524	Advanced to Eliminator
4	A	Rajasthan Royals (3rd)	14	8	6	0	16	0.189	Advanced to Eliminator
5	A	Punjab Kings	14	7	6	1	15	0.309	Eliminated
6	B	Delhi Capitals	14	7	7	0	14	−0.651	Eliminated
7	A	Kolkata Knight Riders	14	6	7	1	13	−0.147	Eliminated
8	A	Chennai Super Kings	14	6	8	0	12	−0.345	Eliminated
9	B	Mumbai Indians	14	4	10	0	8	−0.584	Eliminated
10	B	Lucknow Super Giants	14	4	10	0	8	−0.740	Eliminated

Source: ESPNcricinfo
Rules for classification: 1) Points; 2) Wins; 3) Net run rate; 4) Wickets taken per fair deliveries; 5) drawing lots
(C) Champions; (R) Runners-up

=== League progression ===
League progression
Team	Group matches														Playoffs		
Team	1	2	3	4	5	6	7	8	9	10	11	12	13	14	Q1/E	Q2	F
Lucknow Super Giants	0	2	4	4	4	4	4	4	4	6	6	8	8	8			

Win	Loss	No result

- Note: The total points at the end of each group match are listed.
- Note: Click on the points (group matches) or W/L (playoffs) to see the match summary.

=== Fixtures ===
Match 5
1 April 2026
19:30 (N)
Scorecard

Lucknow Super Giants (H); 141 (18.4 overs)	v	Delhi Capitals; 145/4 (17.1 overs)
Abdul Samad 36 (25); Lungi Ngidi 3/27 (3.4 overs)		Sameer Rizvi 70* (47); Prince Yadav 2/20 (3 overs)

Delhi Capitals won by 6 wickets
Ekana Cricket Stadium, Lucknow
Umpires: Ulhas Gandhe (Ind) and Rohan Pandit (Ind)
Player of the match: Sameer Rizvi (Delhi Capitals)

- Delhi Capitals won the toss and elected to field.
- Pathum Nissanka (Delhi Capitals) made his IPL debut.

Match 10
5 April 2026
15:30 (D/N)
Scorecard

Sunrisers Hyderabad (H); 156/9 (20 overs)	v	Lucknow Super Giants; 160/5 (19.5 overs)
Heinrich Klaasen 62 (41); Mohammed Shami 2/9 (4 overs)		Rishabh Pant 68* (50); Harsh Dubey 2/18 (4 overs)

Lucknow Super Giants won by 5 wickets
Rajiv Gandhi Stadium, Hyderabad
Umpires: Saidarshan Kumar (Ind) and Anish Sahasrabudhe (Ind)
Player of the match: Mohammed Shami (Lucknow Super Giants)

- Lucknow Super Giants won the toss and elected to field.
- Heinrich Klaasen and Nitish Kumar Reddy scored the highest fifth-wicket partnership for Sunrisers Hyderabad (116).

Match 15
9 April 2026
19:30 (N)
Scorecard

Kolkata Knight Riders (H); 181/4 (20 overs)	v	Lucknow Super Giants; 182/7 (20 overs)
Angkrish Raghuvanshi 45 (33); Digvesh Rathi 1/25 (4 overs)		Mukul Choudhary 54* (27); Anukul Roy 2/32 (4 overs)

Lucknow Super Giants won by 3 wickets
Eden Gardens, Kolkata
Umpires: Adrian Holdstock (SA) and Akshay Totre (Ind)
Player of the match: Mukul Choudhary (Lucknow Super Giants)

- Lucknow Super Giants won the toss and elected to field.

Match 19
12 April 2026
15:30 (D/N)
Scorecard

Lucknow Super Giants (H); 164/8 (20 overs)	v	Gujarat Titans; 165/3 (18.4 overs)
Aiden Markram 30 (21); Prasidh Krishna 4/28 (4 overs)		Jos Buttler 60 (37); Prince Yadav 1/31 (4 overs); Digvesh Rathi 1/31 (4 overs)

Gujarat Titans won by 7 wickets
Ekana Cricket Stadium, Lucknow
Umpires: K. N. Ananthapadmanabhan (Ind) and Abhijit Bhattacharya (Ind)
Player of the match: Prasidh Krishna (Gujarat Titans)

- Gujarat Titans won the toss and elected to field.

Match 23
15 April 2026
19:30 (N)
Scorecard

Lucknow Super Giants; 146 (20 overs)	v	Royal Challengers Bengaluru (H); 149/5 (15.1 overs)
Mitchell Marsh 40 (32); Rasikh Salam 4/24 (4 overs)		Virat Kohli 49 (34); Prince Yadav 3/32 (3 overs)

Royal Challengers Bengaluru won by 5 wickets
M. Chinnaswamy Stadium, Bengaluru
Umpires: Adrian Holdstock (SA) and Bhavesh Patel (Ind)
Player of the match: Josh Hazlewood (Royal Challengers Bengaluru)

- Royal Challengers Bengaluru won the toss and elected to field.
- Krunal Pandya (Royal Challengers Bengaluru) took his 100th wicket in IPL.

Match 29
19 April 2026
19:30 (N)
Scorecard

Punjab Kings (H); 254/7 (20 overs)	v	Lucknow Super Giants; 200/5 (20 overs)
Priyansh Arya 93 (37); Prince Yadav 2/25 (4 overs)		Rishabh Pant 43 (23); Marco Jansen 2/36 (4 overs)

Punjab Kings won by 54 runs
Maharaja Yadavindra Singh Stadium, Mullanpur
Umpires: Keyur Kelkar (Ind) and Jayaraman Madanagopal (Ind)
Player of the match: Priyansh Arya (Punjab Kings)

- Lucknow Super Giants won the toss and elected to field.

Match 32
22 April 2026
19:30 (N)
Scorecard

Rajasthan Royals; 159/6 (20 overs)	v	Lucknow Super Giants (H); 119 (18 overs)
Ravindra Jadeja 43* (29); Mohsin Khan 2/17 (4 overs)		Mitchell Marsh 55 (41); Jofra Archer 3/20 (4 overs)

Rajasthan Royals won by 40 runs
Ekana Cricket Stadium, Lucknow
Umpires: Ajitesh Argal (Ind) and Virender Sharma (Ind)
Player of the match: Ravindra Jadeja (Rajasthan Royals)

- Lucknow Super Giants won the toss and elected to field.

Match 38
26 April 2026
19:30 (N)
Scorecard

Kolkata Knight Riders; 155/7 (20 overs)	v	Lucknow Super Giants (H); 155/8 (20 overs)
Rinku Singh 83* (51); Mohsin Khan 5/23 (4 overs)		Rishabh Pant 42 (38); Vaibhav Arora 2/24 (4 overs)

Match tied (Kolkata Knight Riders won the Super Over)
Ekana Cricket Stadium, Lucknow
Umpires: Abhijeet Bengeri (Ind) and Keyur Kelkar (Ind)
Player of the match: Rinku Singh (Kolkata Knight Riders)

- Lucknow Super Giants won the toss and elected to field.
- Super Over: Lucknow Super Giants 1/2 (0.3 overs), Kolkata Knight Riders 4/0 (0.1 overs)

Match 47
4 May 2026
19:30 (N)
Scorecard

Lucknow Super Giants; 228/5 (20 overs)	v	Mumbai Indians (H); 229/4 (18.4 overs)
Nicholas Pooran 63 (21); Corbin Bosch 2/20 (2 overs)		Rohit Sharma 84 (44); Manimaran Siddharth 2/47 (4 overs)

Mumbai Indians won by 6 wickets
Wankhede Stadium, Mumbai
Umpires: Ajitesh Argal (Ind) and Sam Nogajski (Aus)
Player of the match: Ryan Rickelton (Mumbai Indians)

- Mumbai Indians won the toss and elected to field.
- Akshat Raghuwanshi (Lucknow Super Giants) made his IPL debut.

Match 50
7 May 2026
19:30 (N)
Scorecard

Lucknow Super Giants (H); 209/3 (19 overs)	v	Royal Challengers Bengaluru; 203/6 (19 overs)
Mitchell Marsh 111 (56); Krunal Pandya 1/31 (4 overs)		Rajat Patidar 61 (31); Prince Yadav 3/33 (4 overs)

Lucknow Super Giants won by 9 runs (DLS method)
Ekana Cricket Stadium, Lucknow
Umpires: Parashar Joshi (Ind) and Akshay Totre (Ind)
Player of the match: Mitchell Marsh (Lucknow Super Giants)

- Royal Challengers Bengaluru won the toss and elected to field.
- The match was reduced to 19 overs per side due to rain.
- Royal Challengers Bengaluru were set a revised target of 213 runs from 19 overs due to rain.

Match 53
10 May 2026
15:30 (D/N)
Scorecard

Lucknow Super Giants; 203/8 (20 overs)	v	Chennai Super Kings (H); 208/5 (19.2 overs)
Josh Inglis 85 (33); Jamie Overton 3/36 (4 overs)		Urvil Patel 65 (23); Shahbaz Ahmed 2/30 (3 overs)

Chennai Super Kings won by 5 wickets
M. A. Chidambaram Stadium, Chennai
Umpires: Keyur Kelkar (Ind) and Amit Rana (Ind)
Player of the match: Jamie Overton (Chennai Super Kings)

- Chennai Super Kings won the toss and elected to field.
- Lucknow Super Giants were eliminated as a result of this match.

Match 59
15 May 2026
19:30 (N)
Scorecard

Chennai Super Kings; 187/5 (20 overs)	v	Lucknow Super Giants (H); 188/3 (16.4 overs)
Kartik Sharma 71 (42); Akash Singh 3/26 (4 overs)		Mitchell Marsh 90 (38); Mukesh Choudhary 1/24 (3 overs)

Lucknow Super Giants won by 7 wickets
Ekana Cricket Stadium, Lucknow
Umpires: Ulhas Gandhe (Ind) and Tony Ematty (Ind)
Player of the match: Mitchell Marsh (Lucknow Super Giants)

- Lucknow Super Giants won the toss and elected to field.

Match 64
19 May 2026
19:30 (N)
Scorecard

Lucknow Super Giants; 220/5 (20 overs)	v	Rajasthan Royals (H); 225/3 (19.1 overs)
Mitchell Marsh 96 (57); Yash Raj Punja 2/35 (4 overs)		Vaibhav Sooryavanshi 93 (38); Mohsin Khan 1/31 (4 overs)

Rajasthan Royals won by 7 wickets
Sawai Mansingh Stadium, Jaipur
Umpires: Adrian Holdstock (SA) and Parashar Joshi (Ind)
Player of the match: Vaibhav Sooryavanshi (Rajasthan Royals)

- Rajasthan Royals won the toss and elected to field.
- Sushant Mishra (Rajasthan Royals) made his IPL debut.

Match 68
23 May 2026
19:30 (N)
Scorecard

Lucknow Super Giants (H); 196/6 (20 overs)	v	Punjab Kings; 200/3 (18 overs)
Josh Inglis 72 (44); Yuzvendra Chahal 2/25 (4 overs)		Shreyas Iyer 101* (51); Mohammed Shami 2/45 (4 overs)

Punjab Kings won by 7 wickets
Ekana Cricket Stadium, Lucknow
Umpires: Kaushik Gandhi (Ind) and Vinod Seshan (Ind)
Player of the match: Shreyas Iyer (Punjab Kings)

- Punjab Kings won the toss and elected to field.
- Shreyas Iyer (Punjab Kings) scored his 7,000th run in T20s and his maiden century in IPL.
- Delhi Capitals were eliminated as a result of this match.

== Statistics ==
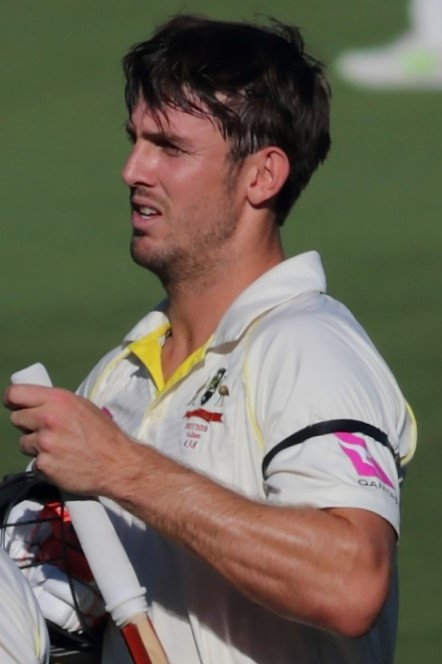
Mitchell Marsh scored the most runs (563) for Lucknow Super Giants in the 2026 Indian Premier League.

Most runs
Runs	Player
563	Mitchell Marsh
312	Rishabh Pant
266	Josh Inglis
234	Nicholas Pooran
231	Aiden Markram

Most wickets
Wickets	Player
16	Prince Yadav
12	Mohammad Shami
11	Mohsin Khan
6	Manimaran Siddharth
6	Avesh Khan
