= List of 2027 Indian Premier League personnel changes =

2027 Indian Premier League auction

General information
- Sport: Cricket
- Date: 16 December 2026
- Time: 14:30 IST
- Location: Goa, India
- Networks: Star Sports (TV); JioHotstar (Digital)

Overview
- League: 2027 Indian Premier League
- Teams: 10

The 2027 Indian Premier League was the 20th edition of the Indian Premier League (IPL), a professional Twenty20 (T20) cricket league held in India, which was organised by the Board of Control for Cricket in India (BCCI). It has been held annually since the first edition in 2008.

The franchises were required to submit their retention lists before 17 November 2026 (initially it was 15 November). The auction will be held on 16 December 2026 in Goa, India.

== Pre-auction ==
Retired players
Date	Name	2026 team	Age	Ref.
30 July 2026	Ajinkya Rahane	Kolkata Knight Riders	38	
17 November 2026	MS Dhoni	Chennai Super Kings	45	

Traded players
Date	Name	Salary	From	To	Ref.
23 June 2026	Rishabh Pant	₹15 crore (US$1.6 million)	Lucknow Super Giants	Delhi Capitals	
23 June 2026	Kuldeep Yadav	₹13.50 crore (US$1.4 million)	Delhi Capitals	Lucknow Super Giants	
14 October 2026	T. Natarajan	₹5 crore (US$530,000)	Delhi Capitals	Sunrisers Hyderabad	
14 October 2026	Zeeshan Ansari	₹40 lakh (US$43,000)	Sunrisers Hyderabad	Delhi Capitals	
5 November 2026	Liam Livingstone	₹6 crore (US$640,000)	Sunrisers Hyderabad	Chennai Super Kings	
5 November 2026	Jack Edwards	₹3 crore (US$320,000)	Sunrisers Hyderabad	Chennai Super Kings	
5 November 2026	Khaleel Ahmed	₹4.8 crore (US$510,000)	Chennai Super Kings	Sunrisers Hyderabad	
5 November 2026	Nathan Ellis	₹2 crore (US$210,000)	Chennai Super Kings	Sunrisers Hyderabad	
11 November 2026	Hardik Pandya	₹18 crore (US$1.9 million)	Mumbai Indians	Punjab Kings	
11 November 2026	Arshdeep Singh	₹18 crore (US$1.9 million)	Punjab Kings	Mumbai Indians	
17 November 2026	Harshal Patel	₹4 crore (US$430,000)	Sunrisers Hyderabad	Gujarat Titans	
17 November 2026	Mohammed Shami	₹8 crore (US$850,000)	Lucknow Super Giants	Rajasthan Royals	
17 November 2026	Manimaran Siddharth	₹75 lakh (US$80,000)	Lucknow Super Giants	Rajasthan Royals	
17 November 2026	Sam Curran	₹2.4 crore (US$260,000)	Rajasthan Royals	Lucknow Super Giants	

== Player retention ==
=== Retention policy ===
The ten franchises could retain any number of players from their previous year's roster, including those who were traded or signed as replacements. The franchises were instructed to submit their retention lists before 17 November 2026. The retentions were announced on 17 September 2026.

Chennai Super Kings
No.	Player	Nationality	Salary
1	Ruturaj Gaikwad	India	₹18 crore (US$1.9 million)
2	Sanju Samson	India	₹18 crore (US$1.9 million)
3	Kartik Sharma	India	₹14.2 crore (US$1.5 million)
4	Shivam Dube	India	₹12 crore (US$1.3 million)
5	Noor Ahmad	Afghanistan	₹10 crore (US$1.1 million)
6	Liam Livingstone	England	₹6 crore (US$640,000)
7	Rahul Chahar	India	₹5.2 crore (US$560,000)
8	Anshul Kamboj	India	₹3.4 crore (US$360,000)
9	Jack Edwards	Australia	₹3 crore (US$320,000)
10	Dewald Brevis	South Africa	₹2.2 crore (US$240,000)
11	Gurjapneet Singh	India	₹2.2 crore (US$240,000)
12	Akeal Hosein	West Indies	₹2 crore (US$210,000)
13	Jamie Overton	England	₹1.5 crore (US$160,000)
14	Sarfaraz Khan	India	₹75 lakh (US$80,000)
15	Mukesh Choudhary	India	₹30 lakh (US$32,000)
16	Ramakrishna Ghosh	India	₹30 lakh (US$32,000)
17	Shreyas Gopal	India	₹30 lakh (US$32,000)
18	Ayush Mhatre	India	₹30 lakh (US$32,000)
19	Urvil Patel	India	₹30 lakh (US$32,000)

Delhi Capitals
No.	Player	Nationality	Salary
1	Axar Patel	India	₹16.5 crore (US$1.8 million)
2	Rishabh Pant	India	₹15 crore (US$1.6 million)
3	KL Rahul	India	₹14 crore (US$1.5 million)
4	Tristan Stubbs	South Africa	₹10 crore (US$1.1 million)
5	Auqib Nabi	India	₹8.4 crore (US$900,000)
6	Mukesh Kumar	India	₹8 crore (US$850,000)
7	Ashutosh Sharma	India	₹3.8 crore (US$410,000)
8	David Miller	South Africa	₹2 crore (US$210,000)
9	Kyle Jamieson	New Zealand	₹2 crore (US$210,000)
10	Lungi Ngidi	South Africa	₹2 crore (US$210,000)
11	Sameer Rizvi	India	₹95 lakh (US$100,000)
12	Prithvi Shaw	India	₹75 lakh (US$80,000)
13	Madhav Tiwari	India	₹40 lakh (US$43,000)
14	Zeeshan Ansari	India	₹40 lakh (US$43,000)
15	Tripurana Vijay	India	₹30 lakh (US$32,000)
16	Vipraj Nigam	India	₹30 lakh (US$32,000)

Gujarat Titans
No.	Player	Nationality	Salary
1	Rashid Khan	Afghanistan	₹18 crore (US$1.9 million)
2	Shubman Gill	India	₹16.5 crore (US$1.8 million)
3	Jos Buttler	England	₹15.75 crore (US$1.7 million)
4	Mohammed Siraj	India	₹12.25 crore (US$1.3 million)
5	Kagiso Rabada	South Africa	₹10.75 crore (US$1.1 million)
6	Prasidh Krishna	India	₹9.5 crore (US$1.0 million)
7	Sai Sudharsan	India	₹8.5 crore (US$910,000)
8	Jason Holder	West Indies	₹7 crore (US$750,000)
9	Rahul Tewatia	India	₹4 crore (US$430,000)
10	Harshal Patel	India	₹4 crore (US$430,000)
11	Washington Sundar	India	₹3.2 crore (US$340,000)
12	Sai Kishore	India	₹2 crore (US$210,000)
13	Glenn Phillips	New Zealand	₹2 crore (US$210,000)
14	Tom Banton	England	₹2 crore (US$210,000)
15	Arshad Khan	India	₹1.3 crore (US$140,000)
16	Gurnoor Brar	India	₹1.3 crore (US$140,000)
17	Ashok Sharma	India	₹90 lakh (US$96,000)
18	Jayant Yadav	India	₹75 lakh (US$80,000)
19	Kumar Kushagra	India	₹65 lakh (US$69,000)
20	Anuj Rawat	India	₹30 lakh (US$32,000)
21	Manav Suthar	India	₹30 lakh (US$32,000)
22	Nishant Sindhu	India	₹30 lakh (US$32,000)

Kolkata Knight Riders
No.	Player	Nationality	Salary
1	Cameron Green	Australia	₹25.2 crore (US$2.7 million)
2	Rinku Singh	India	₹13 crore (US$1.4 million)
3	Sunil Narine	West Indies	₹12 crore (US$1.3 million)
4	Varun Chakravarthy	India	₹12 crore (US$1.3 million)
5	Harshit Rana	India	₹4 crore (US$430,000)
6	Ramandeep Singh	India	₹4 crore (US$430,000)
7	Angkrish Raghuvanshi	India	₹3 crore (US$320,000)
8	Finn Allen	New Zealand	₹2 crore (US$210,000)
9	Tim Seifert	New Zealand	₹1.5 crore (US$160,000)
10	Vaibhav Arora	India	₹1.8 crore (US$190,000)
11	Rovman Powell	West Indies	₹1.5 crore (US$160,000)
12	Manish Pandey	India	₹75 lakh (US$80,000)
13	Anukul Roy	India	₹40 lakh (US$43,000)
14	Kartik Tyagi	India	₹30 lakh (US$32,000)
15	Prashant Solanki	India	₹30 lakh (US$32,000)
16	Sarthak Ranjan	India	₹30 lakh (US$32,000)
17	Saurabh Dubey	India	₹30 lakh (US$32,000)

Lucknow Super Giants
No.	Player	Nationality	Salary
1	Nicholas Pooran	West Indies	₹21 crore (US$2.2 million)
2	Kuldeep Yadav	India	₹13.5 crore (US$1.4 million)
3	Mayank Yadav	India	₹11 crore (US$1.2 million)
4	Josh Inglis	Australia	₹8.6 crore (US$920,000)
5	Abdul Samad	India	₹4.2 crore (US$450,000)
6	Ayush Badoni	India	₹4 crore (US$430,000)
7	Mohsin Khan	India	₹4 crore (US$430,000)
8	Mitchell Marsh	Australia	₹3.4 crore (US$360,000)
9	Mukul Choudhary	India	₹2.6 crore (US$280,000)
10	Shahbaz Ahmed	India	₹2.4 crore (US$260,000)
11	Sam Curran	England	₹2.4 crore (US$260,000)
12	Akshat Raghuwanshi	India	₹2.2 crore (US$240,000)
13	Aiden Markram	South Africa	₹2 crore (US$210,000)
14	Akash Singh	India	₹30 lakh (US$32,000)
15	Arjun Tendulkar	India	₹30 lakh (US$32,000)
16	Arshin Kulkarni	India	₹30 lakh (US$32,000)
17	Digvesh Rathi	India	₹30 lakh (US$32,000)
18	Prince Yadav	India	₹30 lakh (US$32,000)

Mumbai Indians
No.	Player	Nationality	Salary
1	Jasprit Bumrah	India	₹18 crore (US$1.9 million)
2	Arshdeep Singh	India	₹18 crore (US$1.9 million)
3	Suryakumar Yadav	India	₹16.35 crore (US$1.7 million)
4	Rohit Sharma	India	₹16.30 crore (US$1.7 million)
5	Tilak Varma	India	₹8 crore (US$850,000)
6	Will Jacks	England	₹5.25 crore (US$560,000)
7	Naman Dhir	India	₹5.25 crore (US$560,000)
8	Sherfane Rutherford	West Indies	₹2.6 crore (US$280,000)
9	Shardul Thakur	India	₹2 crore (US$210,000)
10	Mitchell Santner	New Zealand	₹2 crore (US$210,000)
11	Ryan Rickelton	South Africa	₹1 crore (US$110,000)
12	Quinton de Kock	South Africa	₹1 crore (US$110,000)
13	Corbin Bosch	South Africa	₹75 lakh (US$80,000)
14	Raj Angad Bawa	India	₹30 lakh (US$32,000)
15	Ashwani Kumar	India	₹30 lakh (US$32,000)
16	Raghu Sharma	India	₹30 lakh (US$32,000)

Punjab Kings
No.	Player	Nationality	Salary
1	Shreyas Iyer	India	₹26.75 crore (US$2.9 million)
2	Yuzvendra Chahal	India	₹18 crore (US$1.9 million)
3	Hardik Pandya	India	₹18 crore (US$1.9 million)
4	Marcus Stoinis	Australia	₹11 crore (US$1.2 million)
5	Marco Jansen	South Africa	₹7 crore (US$750,000)
6	Shashank Singh	India	₹5.5 crore (US$590,000)
7	Ben Dwarshuis	Australia	₹4.4 crore (US$470,000)
8	Prabhsimran Singh	India	₹4 crore (US$430,000)
9	Priyansh Arya	India	₹3.8 crore (US$410,000)
10	Cooper Connolly	Australia	₹3 crore (US$320,000)
11	Azmatullah Omarzai	Afghanistan	₹2.4 crore (US$260,000)
12	Vijaykumar Vyshak	India	₹1.8 crore (US$190,000)
13	Yash Thakur	India	₹1.6 crore (US$170,000)
14	Harpreet Brar	India	₹1.5 crore (US$160,000)
15	Vishnu Vinod	India	₹95 lakh (US$100,000)
16	Xavier Bartlett	Australia	₹80 lakh (US$85,000)
17	Harnoor Pannu	India	₹30 lakh (US$32,000)
18	Musheer Khan	India	₹30 lakh (US$32,000)
19	Suryansh Shedge	India	₹30 lakh (US$32,000)

Rajasthan Royals
No.	Player	Nationality	Salary
1	Yashasvi Jaiswal	India	₹18 crore (US$1.9 million)
2	Riyan Parag	India	₹14 crore (US$1.5 million)
3	Ravindra Jadeja	India	₹14 crore (US$1.5 million)
4	Dhruv Jurel	India	₹14 crore (US$1.5 million)
5	Jofra Archer	England	₹12.50 crore (US$1.3 million)
6	Mohammed Shami	India	₹8 crore (US$850,000)
7	Ravi Bishnoi	India	₹7.2 crore (US$770,000)
8	Sandeep Sharma	India	₹4 crore (US$430,000)
9	Nandre Burger	South Africa	₹3.5 crore (US$370,000)
10	Dasun Shanaka	Sri Lanka	₹2 crore (US$210,000)
11	Vaibhav Sooryavanshi	India	₹1.1 crore (US$120,000)
12	Donovan Ferreira	South Africa	₹1 crore (US$110,000)
13	Sushant Mishra	India	₹90 lakh (US$96,000)
14	Shubham Dubey	India	₹80 lakh (US$85,000)
15	Manimaran Siddharth	India	₹75 lakh (US$80,000)
16	Lhuan-dre Pretorius	South Africa	₹30 lakh (US$32,000)
17	Aman Rao Perla	India	₹30 lakh (US$32,000)
18	Brijesh Sharma	India	₹30 lakh (US$32,000)
19	Yash Raj Punja	India	₹30 lakh (US$32,000)

Royal Challengers Bengaluru
No.	Player	Nationality	Salary
1	Virat Kohli	India	₹21 crore (US$2.2 million)
2	Josh Hazlewood	Australia	₹12.5 crore (US$1.3 million)
3	Phil Salt	England	₹11.5 crore (US$1.2 million)
4	Rajat Patidar	India	₹11 crore (US$1.2 million)
5	Jitesh Sharma	India	₹11 crore (US$1.2 million)
6	Bhuvneshwar Kumar	India	₹10.75 crore (US$1.1 million)
7	Venkatesh Iyer	India	₹7 crore (US$750,000)
8	Rasikh Salam	India	₹6 crore (US$640,000)
8	Krunal Pandya	India	₹5.75 crore (US$610,000)
10	Yash Dayal	India	₹5 crore (US$530,000)
11	Tim David	Australia	₹3 crore (US$320,000)
12	Suyash Sharma	India	₹2.6 crore (US$280,000)
13	Devdutt Padikkal	India	₹2 crore (US$210,000)
14	Jacob Duffy	New Zealand	₹2 crore (US$210,000)
15	Nuwan Thushara	Sri Lanka	₹1.6 crore (US$170,000)
16	Romario Shepherd	West Indies	₹1.5 crore (US$160,000)
17	Jordan Cox	England	₹75 lakh (US$80,000)
18	Abhinandan Singh	India	₹30 lakh (US$32,000)
19	Kanishk Chouhan	India	₹30 lakh (US$32,000)
20	Vicky Ostwal	India	₹30 lakh (US$32,000)

Sunrisers Hyderabad
No.	Player	Nationality	Salary
1	Heinrich Klaasen	South Africa	₹23 crore (US$2.5 million)
2	Pat Cummins	Australia	₹18 crore (US$1.9 million)
3	Abhishek Sharma	India	₹14 crore (US$1.5 million)
4	Ishan Kishan	India	₹11.25 crore (US$1.2 million)
5	Nitish Kumar Reddy	India	₹6 crore (US$640,000)
6	T. Natarajan	India	₹5 crore (US$530,000)
7	Khaleel Ahmed	India	₹4.8 crore (US$510,000)
8	Nathan Ellis	Australia	₹2 crore (US$210,000)
9	Salil Arora	India	₹1.5 crore (US$160,000)
10	Eshan Malinga	Sri Lanka	₹1.2 crore (US$130,000)
11	Brydon Carse	England	₹1 crore (US$110,000)
12	Smaran Ravichandran	India	₹30 lakh (US$32,000)
13	Aniket Verma	India	₹30 lakh (US$32,000)
14	Harsh Dubey	India	₹30 lakh (US$32,000)
15	Krains Fuletra	India	₹30 lakh (US$32,000)
16	Praful Hinge	India	₹30 lakh (US$32,000)
17	Sakib Hussain	India	₹30 lakh (US$32,000)
18	Shivang Kumar	India	₹30 lakh (US$32,000)

== Support staff changes ==
Support staff changes for the 2027 Indian Premier League
Team	Position	Outgoing	Incoming	Ref.
Chennai Super Kings	Head coach	Stephen Fleming	Zaheer Khan	
Chennai Super Kings	Mentor	—N/a	MS Dhoni	
Chennai Super Kings	Assistant coach	—N/a	Albie Morkel; Gareth Batty; Sridharan Sriram	
Chennai Super Kings	Batting coach	Michael Hussey	—N/a	
Chennai Super Kings	Bowling coach	Eric Simons	Mohit Sharma	
Chennai Super Kings	Assistant batting coach	Rajiv Kumar	—N/a	
Chennai Super Kings	Assistant bowling coach	Sridharan Sriram	—N/a	
Delhi Capitals	Head coach	Hemang Badani	Sourav Ganguly	
Delhi Capitals	Director of cricket	Venugopal Rao	Sourav Ganguly	
Delhi Capitals	Assistant coach	Ian Bell	Yuvraj Singh	
Delhi Capitals	Fast bowling coach	Munaf Patel	Chaminda Vaas	
Delhi Capitals	Spin bowling coach	—N/a	Amit Mishra	
Mumbai Indians	Head coach	Mahela Jayawardene	Kieron Pollard	
Mumbai Indians	Batting coach	Kieron Pollard	Robin Uthappa	
Mumbai Indians	Bowling coach	Lasith Malinga; Paras Mhambrey	Mitchell McClenaghan	
Mumbai Indians	Fielding coach	Carl Hopkinson	T. Dilip	
Mumbai Indians	Development bowling coach	—N/a	Dhawal Kulkarni	
