= 2025 Sunrisers Hyderabad season =

Indian Premier League cricket team

Sunrisers Hyderabad
2025 season
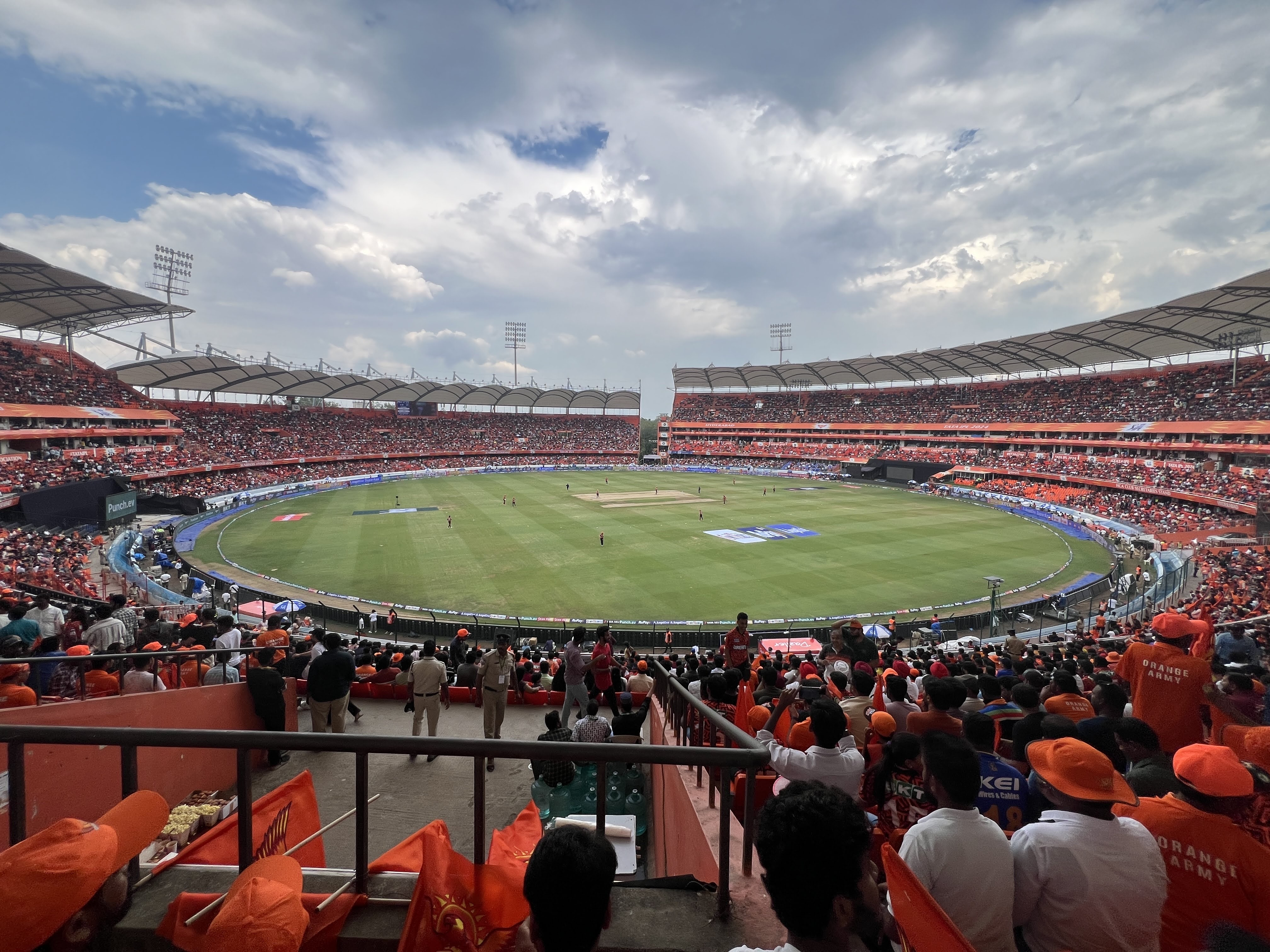
- Rajiv Gandhi Stadium, home ground of Sunrisers Hyderabad
- Coach: Daniel Vettori
- Captain: Pat Cummins
- Ground(s): Rajiv Gandhi Stadium, Hyderabad
- League stage: 6th place
- Most runs: Heinrich Klaasen (487)
- Most wickets: Pat Cummins; Harshal Patel (16 each)
- Most catches: Abhishek Sharma (8)
- Most wicket-keeping dismissals: Heinrich Klaasen (6)

The 2025 season was the 13th season for the Indian Premier League (IPL) cricket franchise Sunrisers Hyderabad. They were one of the ten teams that competed in the 2025 IPL. The team was captained by Pat Cummins and coached by Daniel Vettori.

Sunrisers Hyderabad were the third team to be eliminated from the 2025 IPL and finished the season in sixth place with six wins from 14 matches. Heinrich Klaasen scored the most runs (487) while captain Cummins and Harshal Patel took the most wickets (16 each) for Hyderabad in the 2025 season.

== Pre-season ==
The 2025 Indian Premier League was the 18th edition of the Indian Premier League (IPL), a professional Twenty20 (T20) cricket league, organised by the Board of Control for Cricket in India (BCCI). Sunrisers Hyderabad had previously won the title once in 2016. They were the runners-up in the previous season. The tournament featured ten teams competing in 74 matches from 22 March to 3 June 2025. Hyderabad played all their home matches at Rajiv Gandhi Stadium, except for the last one, which was moved to Arun Jaitley Cricket Stadium following the IPL's suspension and rescheduling.

=== Player Retention ===
Franchises were allowed to retain a maximum of six players from their squad, including a maximum of five recent international players. Franchises were required to submit their retention lists before 31 October 2024. Hyderabad retained five players, including captain Pat Cummins.

Retained players
No.	Player	Salary
1	Heinrich Klaasen	₹23 crore (US$2.4 million)
2	Pat Cummins	₹18 crore (US$1.9 million)
3	Abhishek Sharma	₹14 crore (US$1.5 million)
4	Travis Head	₹14 crore (US$1.5 million)
5	Nitish Kumar Reddy	₹6 crore (US$620,000)

Released players
Batters	Wicket-keepers	All-rounders	Fast bowlers	Spin bowlers
Aiden Markram; Rahul Tripathi; Glenn Phillips; Mayank Agarwal; Anmolpreet Singh	Upendra Yadav	Abdul Samad; Marco Jansen; Shahbaz Ahmed; Washington Sundar; Sanvir Singh	Akash Singh; Bhuvneshwar Kumar; Fazalhaq Farooqi; T Natarajan; Umran Malik; Jaydev Unadkat	Wanindu Hasaranga; Mayank Markande; Jhathavedh Subramanyan; Vijayakanth Viyaskanth

=== Auction ===
The season's auction took place on 24 and 25 November 2024 in Jeddah, Saudi Arabia. The auction purse for each franchise was set at ₹120 crore (US$12 million), with the franchises being deducted an amount from the purse for each retained player. Hyderabad had a purse remaining of ₹45 crore (US$4.7 million). Franchises that did not retain six players, were allowed Right-to-Match (RTM) cards at the auction for each player not retained. Hyderabad had one card available. Hyderabad bought fifteen players in the auction, including eight capped players and four overseas players. Hyderabad did not use their RTM card in the auction.

== Squad ==
- Players with international caps as of start of 2025 IPL are listed in **bold**.
- Ages are as of 22 March 2025.
- Withdrawn players are indicated by a dagger symbol (†) and placed at the bottom of the table.

Sunrisers Hyderabad squad for the 2025 Indian Premier League
S/N	Name	Nationality	Birth date	Batting style	Bowling style	Salary	Notes
4	**Abhishek Sharma**	India	4 September 2000 (aged 24)	Left-handed	Left-arm orthodox	₹14 crore (US$1.5 million)	
7	Harsh Dubey	India	23 May 2002 (aged 22)	Left-handed	Left-arm orthodox	₹30 lakh (US$31,000)	Replacement (Note: Harsh Dubey replaced Smaran Ravichandran, after the latter withdrew due to injury.)
8	**Nitish Kumar Reddy**	India	26 May 2003 (aged 21)	Right-handed	Right-arm medium-fast	₹6 crore (US$620,000)	
11	**Mohammed Shami**	India	3 September 1990 (aged 34)	Right-handed	Right arm medium-fast	₹10 crore (US$1.0 million)	
14	Sachin Baby	India	18 December 1988 (aged 36)	Left-handed	Right-arm off break	₹30 lakh (US$31,000)	
18	Abhinav Manohar	India	16 September 1994 (aged 30)	Right-handed	Right-arm leg break	₹3.2 crore (US$330,000)	
21	**Kamindu Mendis**	Sri Lanka	30 September 1998 (aged 26)	Right-handed	Right-arm off break	₹75 lakh (US$78,000)	Overseas
24	**Wiaan Mulder**	South Africa	19 February 1998 (aged 27)	Right-handed	Right-arm medium-fast	₹75 lakh (US$78,000)	Overseas; replacement (Note: Wiaan Mulder replaced Brydon Carse, after the latter withdrew due to toe injury.)
30	**Pat Cummins**	Australia	8 March 1993 (aged 32)	Right-handed	Right arm fast	₹18 crore (US$1.9 million)	Captain; overseas
32	**Ishan Kishan**	India	18 July 1998 (aged 26)	Left-handed	—N/a	₹11.25 crore (US$1.2 million)	
45	**Heinrich Klaasen**	South Africa	30 July 1991 (aged 33)	Right-handed	Right-arm off spin	₹23 crore (US$2.4 million)	Overseas
47	Aniket Verma	India	5 February 2002 (aged 23)	Right-handed	Right arm medium-fast	₹30 lakh (US$31,000)	
55	**Rahul Chahar**	India	4 August 1999 (aged 25)	Right-handed	Right-arm leg break	₹3.2 crore (US$330,000)	
57	Atharva Taide	India	26 April 2000 (aged 24)	Left-handed	Left-arm orthodox	₹30 lakh (US$31,000)	
62	**Travis Head**	Australia	29 December 1993 (aged 31)	Left-handed	Right-arm off break	₹14 crore (US$1.5 million)	Overseas
68	**Harshal Patel**	India	23 November 1990 (aged 34)	Right-handed	Right arm medium-fast	₹8 crore (US$830,000)	
89	Simarjeet Singh	India	17 January 1998 (aged 27)	Right-handed	Right arm medium-fast	₹1.5 crore (US$160,000)	
91	**Jaydev Unadkat**	India	18 October 1991 (aged 33)	Right-handed	Left-arm medium-fast	₹1 crore (US$100,000)	
99	Zeeshan Ansari	India	16 December 1999 (aged 25)	Right-handed	Right-arm leg break	₹40 lakh (US$42,000)	
100	**Eshan Malinga**	Sri Lanka	4 February 2001 (aged 24)	Right-handed	Right-arm fast-medium	₹1.2 crore (US$120,000)	Overseas
10	Smaran Ravichandran †	India	5 May 2003 (aged 21)	Left-handed	Right-arm off break	₹30 lakh (US$31,000)	Replacement; (Note: Smaran Ravichandran replaced Adam Zampa, after the latter withdrew due to shoulder injury.) withdrawn
88	**Adam Zampa** †	Australia	31 March 1992 (aged 32)	Right-handed	Right arm leg spin	₹2 crore (US$210,000)	Overseas; withdrawn
—N/a	**Brydon Carse** †	England	31 July 1995 (aged 29)	Right-handed	Right-arm fast	₹1 crore (US$100,000)	Overseas; withdrawn

== Support staff ==
Hemang Badani left the squad from a batting coach role while James Franklin joined as a bowling coach replacing Dale Steyn.

Position	Name
Head coach	Daniel Vettori
Bowling coach	Muttiah Muralitharan; James Franklin
Fielding coach	Ryan Cook

- Source: Wisden

== League stage ==
Sunsrisers Hyderabad began their season with a win against Rajasthan Royals. They lost their next four matches to Lucknow Super Giants, Delhi Capitals, Kolkata Knight Riders and Gujarat Titans; won against Punjab Kings, lost to Mumbai Indians twice, won against Chennai Super Kings and lost to Gujarat. Following their abandoned match against Delhi due to rain, Hyderabad were eliminated from the 2025 IPL. Hyderabad won their last three matches of the season against Lucknow, Royal Challengers Bengaluru and Kolkata.

=== Points table ===
League stage standings
Pos	Grp	Team	Pld	W	L	NR	Pts	NRR	Qualification
1	A	Punjab Kings	14	9	4	1	19	0.372	Advance to Qualifier 1
2	A	Royal Challengers Bengaluru	14	9	4	1	19	0.301	Advance to Qualifier 1
3	B	Gujarat Titans	14	9	5	0	18	0.254	Advance to Eliminator
4	B	Mumbai Indians	14	8	6	0	16	1.142	Advance to Eliminator
5	B	Delhi Capitals	14	7	6	1	15	−0.011	Eliminated
6	B	Sunrisers Hyderabad	14	6	7	1	13	−0.241	Eliminated
7	B	Lucknow Super Giants	14	6	8	0	12	−0.376	Eliminated
8	A	Kolkata Knight Riders	14	5	7	2	12	−0.305	Eliminated
9	A	Rajasthan Royals	14	4	10	0	8	−0.549	Eliminated
10	A	Chennai Super Kings	14	4	10	0	8	−0.647	Eliminated

Source: ESPNcricinfo

=== League progression ===
League progression
Team	Group matches														Playoffs		
Team	1	2	3	4	5	6	7	8	9	10	11	12	13	14	Q1/E	Q2	F
Sunrisers Hyderabad	2	2	2	2	2	4	4	4	6	6	7	9	11	13			

Win	Loss	No result

- Note: The total points at the end of each group match are listed.
- Note: Click on the points (group matches) or W/L (playoffs) to see the match summary.

=== Fixtures ===
Match 2
23 March 2025
15:30 (D/N)
Scorecard

Sunrisers Hyderabad (H); 286/6 (20 overs)	v	Rajasthan Royals; 242/6 (20 overs)
Ishan Kishan 106* (47); Tushar Deshpande 3/44 (4 overs)		Dhruv Jurel 70 (35); Harshal Patel 2/34 (4 overs)

Sunrisers Hyderabad won by 44 runs
Rajiv Gandhi International Cricket Stadium, Hyderabad
Umpires: Adrian Holdstock (SA) and Akshay Totre (Ind)
Player of the match: Ishan Kishan (Sunrisers Hyderabad)

- Rajasthan Royals won the toss and elected to field.
- Aniket Verma (Sunrisers Hyderabad) made his IPL debut.

Match 7
27 March 2025
19:30 (N)
Scorecard

Sunrisers Hyderabad (H); 190/9 (20 overs)	v	Lucknow Super Giants; 193/5 (16.1 overs)
Travis Head 47 (28); Shardul Thakur 4/34 (4 overs)		Nicholas Pooran 70 (26); Pat Cummins 2/29 (3 overs)

Lucknow Super Giants won by 5 wickets
Rajiv Gandhi International Cricket Stadium, Hyderabad
Umpires: Abhijit Bhattacharya (Ind) and Ulhas Gandhe (Ind)
Player of the match: Shardul Thakur (Lucknow Super Giants)

- Lucknow Super Giants won the toss and elected to field.

Match 10
30 March 2025
15:30 (N)
Scorecard

Sunrisers Hyderabad; 163 (18.4 overs)	v	Delhi Capitals (H); 166/3 (16 overs)
Aniket Verma 74 (41); Mitchell Starc 5/35 (3.4 overs)		Faf du Plessis 50 (27); Zeeshan Ansari 3/42 (4 overs)

Delhi Capitals won by 7 wickets
ACA–VDCA Cricket Stadium, Visakhapatnam
Umpires: Abhijit Bhattacharya (Ind) and Ulhas Gandhe (Ind)
Player of the match: Mitchell Starc (Delhi Capitals)

- Sunrisers Hyderabad won the toss and elected to bat.
- Zeeshan Ansari (Sunrisers Hyderabad) made his IPL debut.

Match 15
3 April 2025
19:30 (N)
Scorecard

Kolkata Knight Riders (H); 200/6 (20 overs)	v	Sunrisers Hyderabad; 120 (16.4 overs)
Venkatesh Iyer 60 (29); Kamindu Mendis 1/4 (1 over)		Heinrich Klaasen 33 (21); Varun Chakravarthy 3/22 (4 overs)

Kolkata Knight Riders won by 80 runs
Eden Gardens, Kolkata
Umpires: Adrian Holdstock (SA) and Akshay Totre (Ind)
Player of the match: Vaibhav Arora (Kolkata Knight Riders)

- Sunrisers Hyderabad won the toss and elected to field.
- Kamindu Mendis (Sunrisers Hyderabad) made his IPL debut.

Match 19
6 April 2025
19:30 (N)
Scorecard

Sunrisers Hyderabad (H); 152/8 (20 overs)	v	Gujarat Titans; 153/3 (16.4 overs)
Nitish Kumar Reddy 31 (34); Mohammed Siraj 4/17 (4 overs)		Shubman Gill 61* (43); Mohammed Shami 2/28 (4 overs)

Gujarat Titans won by 7 wickets
Rajiv Gandhi International Cricket Stadium, Hyderabad
Umpires: K. N. Ananthapadmanabhan (Ind) and Saidharshan Kumar (Ind)
Player of the match: Mohammed Siraj (Gujarat Titans)

- Gujarat Titans won the toss and elected to field.

Match 27
12 April 2025
19:30 (N)
Scorecard

Punjab Kings; 245/6 (20 overs)	v	Sunrisers Hyderabad (H); 247/2 (18.3 overs)
Shreyas Iyer 82 (36); Harshal Patel 4/42 (4 overs)		Abhishek Sharma 141 (55); Arshdeep Singh 1/37 (4 overs)

Sunrisers Hyderabad won by 8 wickets
Rajiv Gandhi International Cricket Stadium, Hyderabad
Umpires: Keyur Kelkar (Ind) and Akshay Totre (Ind)
Player of the match: Abhishek Sharma (Sunrisers Hyderabad)

- Punjab Kings won the toss and elected to bat.
- Eshan Malinga (Sunrisers Hyderabad) made his IPL debut.

Match 33
17 April 2025
19:30 (N)
Scorecard

Sunrisers Hyderabad; 162/5 (20 overs)	v	Mumbai Indians (H); 166/6 (18.1 overs)
Abhishek Sharma 40 (28); Will Jacks 2/14 (3 overs)		Will Jacks 36 (26); Pat Cummins 3/26 (4 overs)

Mumbai Indians won by 4 wickets
Wankhede Stadium, Mumbai
Umpires: Jayaraman Madanagopal (Ind) and Vinod Seshan (Ind)
Player of the match: Will Jacks (Mumbai Indians)

- Mumbai Indians won the toss and elected to field.

Match 41
23 April 2025
19:30 (N)
Scorecard

Sunrisers Hyderabad (H); 143/8 (20 overs)	v	Mumbai Indians; 146/3 (15.4 overs)
Heinrich Klaasen 71 (44); Trent Boult 4/26 (4 overs)		Rohit Sharma 70 (46); Jaydev Unadkat 1/25 (3 overs)

Mumbai Indians won by 7 wickets
Rajiv Gandhi International Cricket Stadium, Hyderabad
Umpires: Jayaraman Madanagopal (Ind) and Vinod Seshan (Ind)
Player of the match: Trent Boult (Mumbai Indians)

- Mumbai Indians won the toss and elected to field.

Match 43
25 April 2025
19:30 (N)
Scorecard

Chennai Super Kings (H); 154 (19.5 overs)	v	Sunrisers Hyderabad; 155/5 (18.4 overs)
Dewald Brevis 42 (25); Harshal Patel 4/28 (4 overs)		Ishan Kishan 44 (34); Noor Ahmad 2/42 (4 overs)

Sunrisers Hyderabad won by 5 wickets
M. A. Chidambaram Stadium, Chennai
Umpires: Mohit Krishnadas (Ind) and Nitin Menon (Ind)
Player of the match: Harshal Patel (Sunrisers Hyderabad)

- Sunrisers Hyderabad won the toss and elected to field.

Match 51
2 May 2025
19:30 (N)
Scorecard

Gujarat Titans (H); 224/6 (20 overs)	v	Sunrisers Hyderabad; 186/6 (20 overs)
Shubman Gill 76 (38); Jaydev Unadkat 3/35 (4 overs)		Abhishek Sharma 74 (41); Prasidh Krishna 2/19 (4 overs)

Gujarat Titans won by 38 runs
Narendra Modi Stadium, Ahmedabad
Umpires: Virender Sharma (Ind) and Kannur Swaroopanand (Ind)
Player of the match: Prasidh Krishna (Gujarat Titans)

- Sunrisers Hyderabad won the toss and elected to field.

Match 55
5 May 2025
19:30 (N)
Scorecard

Delhi Capitals; 133/7 (20 overs)	v	Sunrisers Hyderabad (H)
Ashutosh Sharma 41 (26); Pat Cummins 3/19 (4 overs)

No result
Rajiv Gandhi International Cricket Stadium, Hyderabad
Umpires: Virender Sharma (Ind) and Kannur Swaroopanand (Ind)

- Sunrisers Hyderabad won the toss and elected to field.
- No further play was possible due to rain.
- Sunrisers Hyderabad were eliminated as a result of this match.

Match 61
19 May 2025
19:30 (N)
Scorecard

Lucknow Super Giants (H); 205/7 (20 overs)	v	Sunrisers Hyderabad; 206/4 (18.2 overs)
Mitchell Marsh 65 (39); Eshan Malinga 2/28 (4 overs)		Abhishek Sharma 59 (20); Digvesh Rathi 2/37 (4 overs)

Sunrisers Hyderabad won by 6 wickets
Ekana Cricket Stadium, Lucknow
Umpires: Michael Gough (Eng) and Kannur Swaroopanand (Ind)
Player of the match: Abhishek Sharma (Sunrisers Hyderabad)

- Sunrisers Hyderabad won the toss and elected to field.
- This match was originally scheduled for 18 May at the same venue, before being rescheduled.
- Harsh Dubey (Sunrisers Hyderabad) made his IPL debut.
- Lucknow Super Giants were eliminated as a result of this match.

Match 65
23 May 2025
19:30 (N)
Scorecard

Sunrisers Hyderabad; 231/6 (20 overs)	v	Royal Challengers Bengaluru (H); 189 (19.5 overs)
Ishan Kishan 94* (48); Romario Shepherd 2/14 (2 overs)		Phil Salt 62 (32); Pat Cummins 3/28 (4 overs)

Sunrisers Hyderabad won by 42 runs
Ekana Cricket Stadium, Lucknow
Umpires: Michael Gough (Eng) and Kannur Swaroopanand (Ind)
Player of the match: Ishan Kishan (Sunrisers Hyderabad)

- Royal Challengers Bengaluru won the toss and elected to field.
- This match was originally scheduled for 13 May at M. Chinnaswamy Stadium, before being rescheduled to the same venue, but was later moved to Lucknow due to the weather conditions in Bengaluru.

Match 68
25 May 2025
19:30 (N)
Scorecard

Sunrisers Hyderabad (H); 278/3 (20 overs)	v	Kolkata Knight Riders; 168 (18.4 overs)
Heinrich Klaasen 105* (39); Sunil Narine 2/42 (4 overs)		Manish Pandey 37 (23); Jaydev Unadkat 3/24 (4 overs)

Sunrisers Hyderabad won by 110 runs
Arun Jaitley Stadium, Delhi
Umpires: Adrian Holdstock (SA) and Keyur Kelkar (Ind)
Player of the match: Heinrich Klaasen (Sunrisers Hyderabad)

- Sunrisers Hyderabad won the toss and elected to bat.
- This match was originally scheduled for 10 May at the Rajiv Gandhi Stadium, before being rescheduled.

== Statistics ==
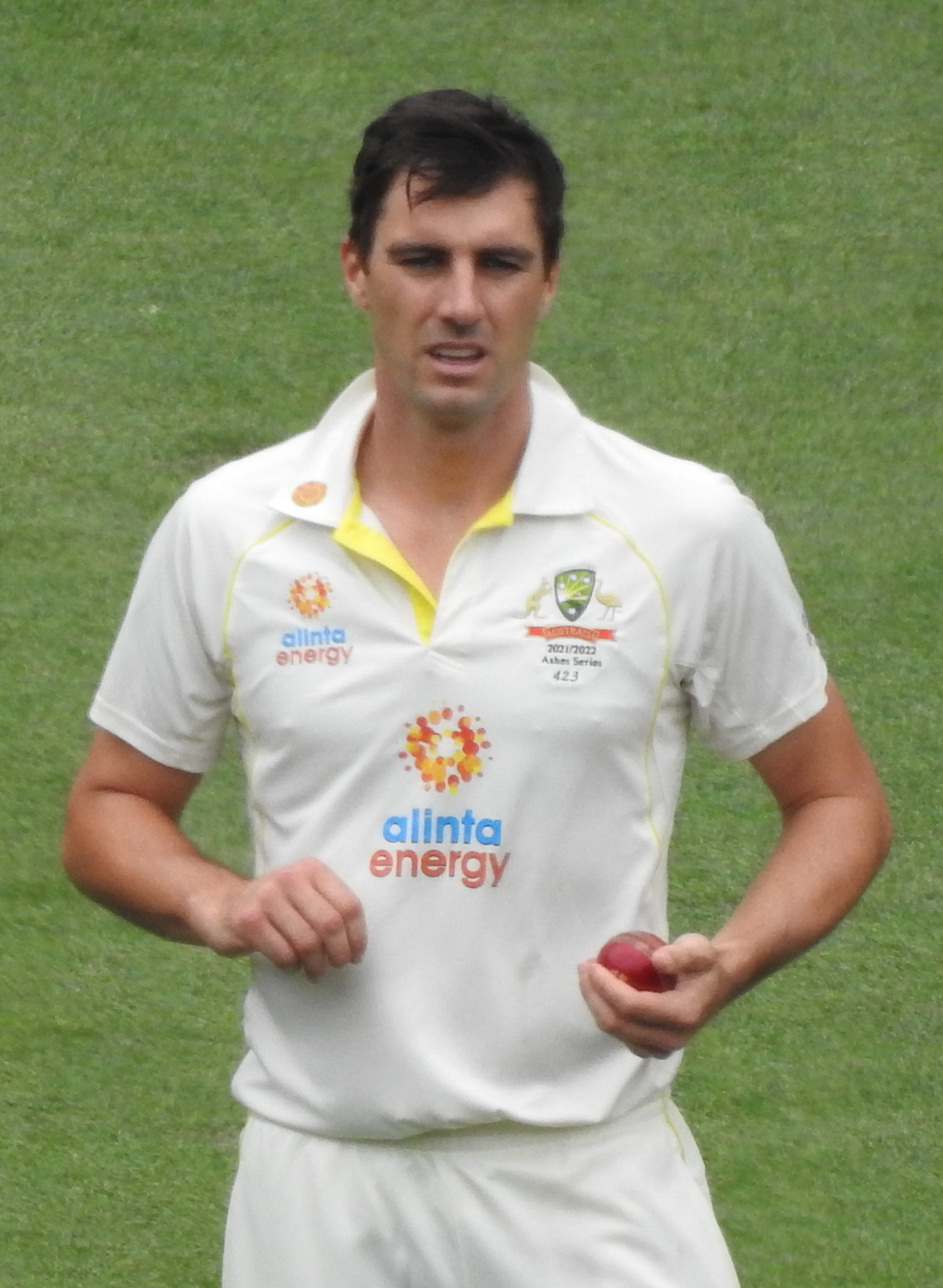
Pat Cummins took the most wickets (16) for Sunrisers Hyderabad in the 2025 Indian Premier League.

At the IPL end of season awards, Kamindu Mendis was awarded for catch of the season.

Most runs
Runs	Player
487	Heinrich Klaasen
439	Abhishek Sharma
374	Travis Head
354	Ishan Kishan
236	Aniket Verma

Most wickets
Wickets	Player
16	Pat Cummins
16	Harshal Patel
13	Eshan Malinga
11	Jaydev Unadkat
6	Zeeshan Ansari
