= Prashant Veer =

Indian cricketer (born 2005)

Personal information
- Full name: Prashant Ramendra Veer
- Born: 24 November 2005 (age 20); Amethi, Uttar Pradesh, India
- Batting: Left-handed
- Bowling: Left-arm orthodox spin
- Role: All rounder

Domestic team information
- Years: Team
- 2023–present: Uttar Pradesh
- 2026–present: Chennai Super Kings

Career statistics
Competition	FC	T20
Matches	2	9
Runs scored	7	112
Batting average	3.50	28.00
100s/50s	0/0	0/0
Top score	6	40*
Balls bowled	79	186
Wickets	2	12
Bowling average	14.00	16.66
5 wickets in innings	–	–
10 wickets in match	–	–
Best bowling	2/13	3/7
Catches/stumpings	1/–	4/–
- Source: ESPNcricinfo, 22 December 2025

Prashant Ramendra Veer (born 24 November 2005) is an Indian cricketer, who plays as an all rounder. He is a left-handed batter, and a left arm orthodox spin bowler. He represents the Uttar Pradesh cricket team. He made his Twenty20 debut for Uttar Pradesh against Tamil Nadu on 17 October 2023, and his first class debut against Odisha on 25 October 2025.

In the player auction conducted ahead of the 2026 Indian Premier League, he was picked up by the Chennai Super Kings for ₹142 million (US$1.5 million), the highest ever bid for an uncapped player in the history of the Indian Premier League.
