= Kartik Sharma =

Indian cricketer (born 2006)

Personal information
- Born: 26 April 2006 (age 20); Bharatpur, Rajasthan, India
- Batting: Right-handed
- Role: Wicket keeper batter

Domestic team information
- Years: Team
- 2024–present: Rajasthan
- 2026: Chennai Super Kings

Career statistics
Competition	FC	LA	T20	IPL
Matches	10	9	23	11
Runs scored	526	445	629	295
Batting average	37.57	55.62	31.45	32.78
100s/50s	3/0	2/2	0/4	0/2
Top score	139	123	71	71
Balls bowled	-	-	-	-
Wickets	-	-	-	-
Bowling average	-	-	-	-
5 wickets in innings	-	-	-	-
10 wickets in match	-	-	-	-
Best bowling	-	-	-	-
Catches/stumpings	5/1	7/–	4/–	1/-
- Source: cricinfo, 21 October 2026

Kartik Sharma (born 26 April 2006) is an Indian cricketer, who plays as a wicket keeper. He is a right-handed middle order batter. He represents the Rajasthan cricket team. He made his first class and Twenty20 debut for Rajasthan in November 2025, and played his first List A match in December 2025.

In the player auction conducted ahead of the 2026 Indian Premier League, he was picked up by the Chennai Super Kings for ₹142 million (US$1.5 million), the highest ever bid for an uncapped player in the history of the Indian Premier League alongside fellow Chennai Super Kings buy Prashant Veer.

== Franchise cricket ==
Karthik Sharma was taken by Chennai Super Kings in the auction for 14.2 crores. He gave really good performances for the team. His knock of 54 off 40 was his first fifty. He and Ruturaj Gaikwad had a partnership against the Mumbai Indians in a tough chase. One of his best performances came against the Lucknow Super Giants where he scored a knock of 71 off 42 balls to give a big score.
