= Mukul Choudhary =

Indian cricketer (born 2004)

Personal information
- Full name: Mukul Dalip Choudhary
- Born: 6 August 2004 (age 22); Jhunjhunu, Rajasthan India
- Batting: Right-handed
- Role: Wicket-keeper-batter

Domestic team information
- Years: Team
- 2023–present: Rajasthan
- 2026: Lucknow Super Giants

Career statistics
Competition	FC	LA	T20	IPL
Matches	3	1	7	3
Runs scored	51	5	210	70
Batting average	12.75	5.00	42.00	70.00
100s/50s	0/0	0/0	0/2	0/1
Top score	45	5	62*	54*
Catches/stumpings	3/-	-/-	2/-	-/-
- Source: ESPNcricinfo, 25 Dec 2025

Mukul Dalip Choudhary (born 6 August 2004) is an Indian cricketer, who plays as a wicket keeper batter. He plays for Rajasthan in domestic cricket and Lucknow Super Giants in the Indian Premier League.

Choudhary made his first-class debut on 17 January 2023 in the 2022–23 Ranji Trophy and his List A debut on 24 December 2025 in the 2025–26 Vijay Hazare Trophy.

Choudhary was purchased by the Lucknow Super Giants ahead of the 2026 Indian Premier League for ₹2.6 crore in the auction. On 9 April 2026, Choudhary hit a match winning 54* off 27 deliveries as he single handedly helped Lucknow Super Giants chase down 182 against Kolkata Knight Riders on the last ball.
