= Vijay Dahiya =

Indian cricketer (born 1973)

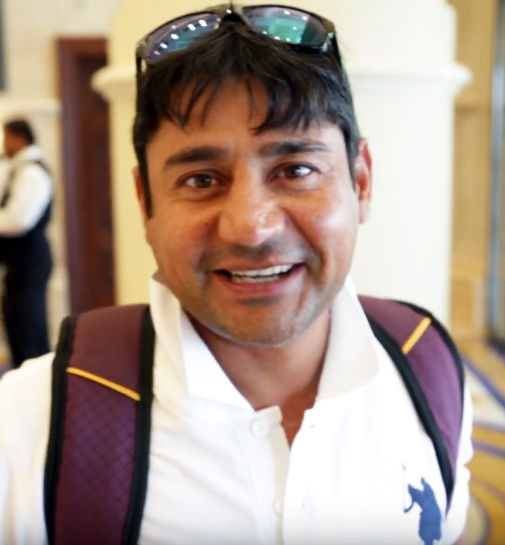
- Vijay Dahiya (during 2014 IPL)

Personal information
- Born: 10 May 1973 (age 53); Delhi, India
- Batting: Right-handed
- Role: Wicket-keeper

International information
- National side: India (2000–2001)
- Test debut (cap 232): 18 November 2000 v Zimbabwe
- Last Test: 25 November 2000 v Zimbabwe
- ODI debut (cap 132): 3 October 2000 v Kenya
- Last ODI: 6 April 2001 v Australia

Domestic team information
- Years: Team
- 1993/94–2006: Delhi

Career statistics
Competition	Test	ODI	FC	LA
Matches	2	19	84	83
Runs scored	2	216	3,532	1,389
Batting average	–	16.61	33.63	21.70
100s/50s	0/0	0/1	3/24	1/6
Top score	2*	51	152	102
Catches/stumpings	6/0	19/5	196/20	80/23
Medal record
Men's Cricket
Representing India
ICC Champions Trophy
Runner-up	2000 Kenya
- Source: , 20 December 2013

Vijay Dahiya (born 10 May 1973) is a former Indian wicketkeeper. He is currently coach of the Uttar Pradesh cricket team and assistant coach of Gujarat Titans in Indian Premier League. He was a part of the squad which finished as runners-up at the 2000 ICC Champions Trophy.

== First class career ==
Dahiya was a right-handed batsman and wicket-keeper who started playing First-class cricket for Delhi in 1993/94. He made his international debut during the 2000/01 series against Zimbabwe.

Dahiya was also a part of the North Zone cricket team which won the Duleep and Deodhar Trophies during the 1999/00 season. In 2009, Dahiya was appointed as the assistant coach of Kolkata Knight Riders, the Kolkata-based franchise cricket team of the Indian Premier League.

Dahiya made his first-class debut against Punjab at Ludhiana in the 1993/94 season. He was an integral part of the North Zone team which lifted the Duleep and Deodhar Trophies in 1999–2000, and also captained Delhi for some time. Dahiya retired from all forms of cricket after playing his last match against Uttar Pradesh in December 2006. Just before retirement, he began his Ranji season with a fine 102, his highest first-class score, against Tamil Nadu that bailed Delhi out of trouble, and effected a stumping against Uttar Pradesh's Praveen Kumar that helped his team gain a vital first-innings lead.

== International career ==
Dahiya's international debut was in an ODI against Kenya at Nairobi Gymkhana in October 2000 in the ICC Knockout Trophy. His contribution in that match, which India eventually won, was a catch. In all, he played 19 ODIs for India.

His last ODI was against Australia at Fatorda Stadium in the 2001 series. Dahiya's highest ODI score was 51 against Australia in the first ODI at M. Chinnaswamy Stadium, which helped set up a match-winning total of 315.

Dahiya made his Test debut against Zimbabwe at his home ground Feroz Shah Kotla in November 2000. The match ended in a draw. He played only one more Test match against the same opponent at Vidarbha Cricket Association Stadium. In the second match, Dahiya took six catches.

== Coaching career ==
He was named Delhi coach in 2007/08 season and was sacked 2013/14 season due to his Kolkata Knight Riders commitments. During this period he led them to a Ranji Trophy triumph in 2007–08 season to end a 16-year title drought. He was appointed the assistant coach of the IPL franchise Kolkata Knight Riders in 2009.

In September 2014, he was re-appointed as the head coach of the Delhi's Ranji Trophy team for 2014/15 season.

In December 2019, he was appointed as head talent scout of the IPL franchise Delhi Capitals. In September 2021, he was named as the head coach of Uttar Pradesh ahead of the 2021/22 season in India.

In December 2021, he was appointed as assistant coach of Lucknow Super Giants.
