= Bharat Arun =

Indian cricket player and Coach

Personal information
- Born: 14 December 1962 (age 63); Vijayawada, Andhra Pradesh, India
- Batting: Right-handed
- Bowling: Right arm medium pace
- Role: All-rounder

International information
- National side: India (1986–1987)
- Test debut (cap 176): 17 December 1986 v Sri Lanka
- Last Test: 7 January 1987 v Sri Lanka
- ODI debut (cap 60): 24 December 1986 v Sri Lanka
- Last ODI: 10 April 1987 v Pakistan

Domestic team information
- Years: Team
- 1982/83–1991/92: Tamil Nadu

Career statistics
Competition	Test	ODI	FC	LA
Matches	2	4	48	15
Runs scored	4	21	1,652	137
Batting average	4.00	10.50	30.59	15.22
100s/50s	0/0	0/0	4/4	0/0
Top score	2*	8	149	29
Balls bowled	252	102	5,397	526
Wickets	4	1	110	8
Bowling average	29.00	103.00	32.44	63.12
5 wickets in innings	0	0	3	0
10 wickets in match	0	0	1	0
Best bowling	3/76	1/43	6/79	2/43
Catches/stumpings	2/–	0/–	23/–	2/–
- Source: ESPNcricinfo, 25 September 2008

Bharat Arun (born 14 December 1962), is a former Indian Test cricketer and bowling coach for the India national cricket team, and the current bowling coach for the Lucknow Super Giants. Previously, he served as a bowling coach of Kolkata Knight Riders for 4 IPL seasons.

== Early life ==
Arun is the elder brother of actor Anand and they have two brothers: B. Ramesh, a Vice President of Finance with Times of India and Dr. B. Suresh, a teacher at English Vivekananda College.

== Playing career ==
Arun was a medium pacer and an attacking lower order batsman. In the semifinal of the 1986/87 Duleep Trophy he hit 149 and added 221 for the seventh wicket with W. V. Raman as South Zone chased a West total of 516 for the first innings lead. A 107* for India Under-25 against the visiting Sri Lankans just before the selection of the side for the Tests against Sri Lanka won him a place in the side. He was part of the Indian under 19 team that toured Sri Lanka in 1979 under the captaincy of Ravi Shastri.

He played two Test matches, both during the three-match series against Sri Lanka in 1986–87, with the 3 for 76 in his first match as his best bowling figures (after slipping and falling down, to some hilarity, when he ran in to bowl his first ball). He was part of India's side for the 1987 Sharjah Cup, and appeared in all of India's three matches without distinction. He was a part of the Tamil Nadu team that won the Ranji Trophy in 1987/88. He announced his retirement from first-class cricket in November 1993.

== Coaching ==
Arun began his coaching career with Tamil Nadu in 2002. He served as the Indian bowling coach from 2014 to 2015, then again from 16 July 2017 until the end of the 2021 ICC Men's T20 World Cup. The latter appointment was unusual as Zaheer Khan had already been announced in that position, but the new Indian coach Ravi Shastri pushed for a more experienced head bowling coach, with Khan instead taking up a role as bowling consultant. In January 2022, Arun was appointed as bowling coach for the Kolkata Knight Riders.
