= Abhay Sharma =

Indian former first-class cricketer (born 1969)

Personal information
- Born: 30 April 1969 (age 57); Delhi, India
- Batting: Right-handed
- Role: Wicket-keeper

Domestic team information
- Years: Team
- 1987/88–1990/91: Delhi
- 1991/92–2003/04: Railways
- 1996/97: Rajasthan

Career statistics
Competition	FC	List A
Matches	89	40
Runs scored	4,105	780
Batting average	35.38	23.63
100s/50s	9/20	0/1
Top score	188	69*
Balls bowled	151	24
Wickets	0	0
Bowling average	–	–
5 wickets in innings	–	–
10 wickets in match	–	n/a
Best bowling	–	–
Catches/stumpings	145/34	20/11
- Source: ESPNcricinfo, 20 January 2016

Abhay Sharma (born 30 April 1969) is an Indian former first-class cricketer who played for Delhi, Railways and Rajasthan. As of January 2016, he works as the fielding coach of India A and India Under-19s. In 2021, he was named as the fielding coach of Indian women's national cricket team.

Abhay Sharma: Former Ranji trophy player, India U19 World Cup winning coach (2018), and a renowned coach for batting and fielding with National Cricket Academy.

== Playing career ==
Sharma was a right-handed wicket-keeper batsman representing teams such as Delhi, Railways, Rajasthan, Central Zone, India under-19s and the Board President's XI. In a career that spanned 1987/88 to 2003/04, he appeared in 89 first-class and 40 List A matches. He was part of the Delhi team that won the 1988–89 Ranji Trophy. He was the Railways captain when they won the Ranji Trophy in 2001-02. He finished his career with Railways, scoring over 4000 runs at an average of 35.38 and making 179 dismissals in first-class matches. Abhay Sharma: Former Ranji trophy player, India U19 World Cup winning coach (2018), and a renowned coach for batting and fielding with National Cricket Academy.

== Coaching career ==
Sharma was the Railways cricket team coach for seven years starting from 2007. Having completed coaching courses in batting, fielding and wicket-keeping in England, he was assigned to coach in the National Cricket Academy as well as India B in the Challenger Trophy. In 2013, he became the fielding and wicket-keeping coach of India A. He was appointed as the head coach of Himachal Pradesh in 2014 ahead of the 2014–15 Ranji Trophy. He became the fielding coach of India Under-19s in 2015.

He had picked a 19-year-old Karn Sharma in the Railways squad for 2007–08 Ranji Trophy. After Karn scored a century on his first-class debut that season, Abhay trained him on his leg spin bowling and has been his coach since then.

He was named fielding coach of India national cricket team for Zimbabwe tour in June 2016. He worked under interim head coach Sanjay Bangar.
