= Himmat Singh (cricketer) =

Indian cricketer

Personal information
- Born: 8 November 1996 (age 30); Delhi, India
- Batting: Right-handed
- Bowling: Right arm off break
- Role: Batsman

Domestic team information
- Years: Team
- 2015–present: Delhi
- 2025–present: Lucknow Super Giants

Career statistics
Competition	FC	LA	T20
Matches	33	55	55
Runs scored	1,738	1,858	917
Batting average	36.97	47.64	28.65
100s/50s	2/13	6/9	0/5
Top score	194	132*	77*
Balls bowled	268	30	9
Wickets	5	0	1
Bowling average	32.60	–	10.00
5 wickets in innings	0	0	0
10 wickets in match	0	–	–
Best bowling	3/42	–	1/0
Catches/stumpings	37/–	29/–	23/–
- Source: ESPNcricinfo, 20 March 2025

Himmat Singh (born 8 November 1996) is an Indian cricketer who plays for Delhi in domestic cricket. He bats right-handed and bowls right-arm off break. He represented Delhi at the Under-16, Under-19 and Under-23 levels and North Zone at the Under-19 level.

Himmat was selected in the Delhi squad for 2014–15 Ranji Trophy after his fine performance for the Delhi Under-19s, but did not appear in any of the matches. He made his List A cricket debut at the age of 19 during the 2015–16 Vijay Hazare Trophy in December 2015. Later that month, Himmat's father Tejbir Singh filed a criminal defamation case against Kirti Azad, Bishan Singh Bedi, Surinder Khanna and Sameer Bahadur for allegedly stating that Tejbir had exchanged ₹25 lakh for his son's selection in the Delhi squad for the Vijay Hazare Trophy.

He made his first-class debut for Delhi in the 2017–18 Ranji Trophy on 14 October 2017. He made his Twenty20 debut for Delhi in the 2017–18 Zonal T20 League on 9 January 2018.

In December 2018, he was named in India's team for the 2018 ACC Emerging Teams Asia Cup. Later the same month, he was bought by the Royal Challengers Bangalore in the player auction for the 2019 Indian Premier League. He was released by the Royal Challengers Bangalore ahead of the 2020 IPL auction.
