= Ramakrishna Ghosh =

Indian cricketer

Personal information
- Full name: Ramakrishna Shekhar Ghosh
- Born: 28 August 1997 (age 29); Nashik, Maharashtra, India
- Batting: Right-handed
- Bowling: Right-arm medium-fast
- Role: Bowling all-rounder

Domestic team information
- Years: Team
- 2022/23–present: Maharashtra
- 2026: Chennai Super Kings

Career statistics
Competition	FC	LA	T20
Matches	13	11	10
Runs scored	455	246	45
Batting average	30.33	35.14	9.00
100s/50s	0/2	0/2	0/0
Top score	99	73	13*
Balls bowled	1,587	484	156
Wickets	28	21	3
Bowling average	33.00	21.85	92.00
5 wickets in innings	0	0	0
10 wickets in match	0	0	0
Best bowling	5/72	7/42	1/24
Catches/stumpings	6/–	3/–	3/–
- Source: Cricinfo, 22 October 2026

Ramakrishna Shekhar Ghosh (born 28 August 1997) is an Indian cricketer from Nashik, Maharashtra. A right-arm medium-fast bowler and right-handed batsman, he plays as a bowling all-rounder for Maharashtra in domestic cricket and was signed by Chennai Super Kings for the 2025 Indian Premier League (IPL) season.

Ghosh made his T20 debut for Maharashtra in the 2022-23 Syed Mushtaq Ali Trophy, notably dismissing Mayank Agarwal. In the 2024/25 Ranji Trophy he took 11 wickets in six matches at an average of 41.45, with a best of 3/50 against Odisha, and scored 313 runs, including two fifties, at an average of 39.12. In the 2024 Maharashtra Premier League, he excelled for Puneri Bappa, taking 20 wickets in 15 matches at an average of 17.20, with best figures of 4/30, and scoring 118 runs.

In the IPL, Ghosh was acquired by Chennai Super Kings for INR 30 lakhs in the 2025 auction.
