= Zeeshan Ansari =

Indian cricketer (born 1999)

Personal information
- Born: 16 December 1999 (age 26); Lucknow, Uttar Pradesh, India
- Batting: Right-handed
- Bowling: Legbreak googly

Domestic team information
- Years: Team
- 2017/18–2019/20: Uttar Pradesh
- 2025-2026: Sunrisers Hyderabad
- 2027: Delhi Capitals

Career statistics
Competition	First-class	Twenty20
Matches	5	10
Runs scored	117	–
Batting average	23.40	–
100s/50s	0/1	–
Top score	76	–
Balls bowled	858	215
Wickets	17	6
Bowling average	30.76	57.16
5 wickets in innings	0	0
10 wickets in match	0	0
Best bowling	3/33	3/42
Catches/stumpings	3/–	5/–
- Source: ESPNcricinfo, 11 May 2025

Zeeshan Ansari (born 16 December 1999) is an Indian cricketer who currently plays for Uttar Pradesh in domestic cricket and Delhi Capitals in the Indian Premier League. He is a leg-break bowler. He made his first-class debut for Uttar Pradesh in the 2017–18 Ranji Trophy on 6 October 2017. Prior to his first class debut, he was part of India's squad for the 2016 Under-19 Cricket World Cup. He made his Twenty20 debut for Uttar Pradesh in the 2018–19 Syed Mushtaq Ali Trophy on 28 February 2019.

== Indian Premier League ==
Zeeshan Ansari made his IPL debut with the Sunrisers Hyderabad in 2025 against the Delhi Capitals, picking up 3/42. Ansari caught the attention of IPL franchises after finishing as the leading wicket-taker in the inaugural UP T20 League, claiming 24 wickets in 12 matches at an impressive economy rate of 7.60. In the high-scoring final, he played a crucial role with a spell of 4-0-20-1 for Meerut Mavericks and played a crucial role in making them champions.
