= Akshat Raghuwanshi =

Indian cricketer (born 2003)

Personal information
- Born: 15 September 2003 (age 23)
- Batting: Right-handed
- Bowling: Right-arm off break

Domestic team information
- Years: Team
- 2022–present: Madhya Pradesh
- 2026: Lucknow Super Giants
- Source: ESPNcricinfo, 5 March 2023

Akshat Raghuwanshi (born 15 September 2003) is an Indian cricketer. He made his first-class debut for Madhya Pradesh in the 2021–22 Ranji Trophy on 24 February 2022. He made his Twenty20 debut for Madhya Pradesh in the 2022–23 Syed Mushtaq Ali Trophy on 11 October 2022. He made his List A debut for Madhya Pradesh in the 2022–23 Vijay Hazare Trophy on 12 November 2022.

== IPL 2026 ==
Ahead of IPL 2026, Raghuwanshi was acquired by Lucknow Super Giants.
