= Aniket Verma =

Indian cricketer (born 2002)

Aniket Umashankar Verma
Personal information
- Born: 5 February 2002 (age 24); Jhansi, Uttar Pradesh, India
- Batting: Right-handed
- Bowling: Right arm medium-fast
- Role: Batter

Domestic team information
- Years: Team
- 2024-present: Madhya Pradesh
- 2025-present: Sunrisers Hyderabad (squad no. 108)

Career statistics
Competition	T20
Matches	26
Runs scored	399
Batting average	21.00
100s/50s	0/1
Top score	74
Catches/stumpings	6/–
- Source: ESPN Cricinfo, 29 March 2026

Aniket Umashankar Verma (born 5 February 2002) is an Indian cricketer who plays for Sunrisers Hyderabad in Indian Premier League.

== Career ==
Verma made his Twenty20 debut on 3 December 2024, for Madhya Pradesh in the 2024-25 Syed Mushtaq Ali Trophy. While he is best known as a T20 "power-hitter," his rise to prominence was fueled by exceptional performances in age-group one-day cricket.

=== List A ===
==== Under-23 breakthrough ====
He gained significant attention in December 2024 after smashing an unbeaten 101 off 75 balls (including six 4s and eight 6s) for Madhya Pradesh against Karnataka in the Under-23 one-day tournament.

==== Senior List A ====
He transitioned to senior representative cricket in late 2024. While many profiles focus on his T20 and IPL debut, he has been a consistent part of Madhya Pradesh's Vijay Hazare Trophy (List A) plans for the 2025/26 season.

=== IPL ===
He made his IPL debut against Rajasthan Royals on 23 March 2025.
