= Manimaran Siddharth =

Indian cricketer (born 1998)

Personal information
- Full name: Manimaran Siddharth
- Born: 3 July 1998 (age 28); Karaikudi, Tamil Nadu, India
- Batting: Right-handed
- Bowling: Slow left arm orthodox
- Role: Bowler

Domestic team information
- Years: Team
- 2019–present: Tamil Nadu
- 2024–present: Lucknow Super Giants
- Source: ESPNcricinfo, 22 November 2019

Manimaran Siddharth (born 3 July 1998) is an Indian cricketer who plays for Tamil Nadu in domestic cricket and Lucknow Super Giants in the Indian Premier League. He is a left-arm orthodox bowler.

== Domestic cricket ==
Siddharth made his Twenty20 debut on 22 November 2019, for Tamil Nadu in the 2019–20 Syed Mushtaq Ali Trophy. He made his first-class debut on 9 December 2019, for Tamil Nadu in the 2019–20 Ranji Trophy. He made his List A debut on 20 February 2021, for Tamil Nadu in the 2020–21 Vijay Hazare Trophy.

== Indian Premier League ==
In the 2020 IPL auction, he was bought by the Kolkata Knight Riders ahead of the 2020 Indian Premier League. In February 2021, Siddharth was bought by the Delhi Capitals in the IPL auction ahead of the 2021 Indian Premier League. He was replaced by Kulwant Khejroliya after an injury.
