= Sameer Rizvi =

Indian cricketer

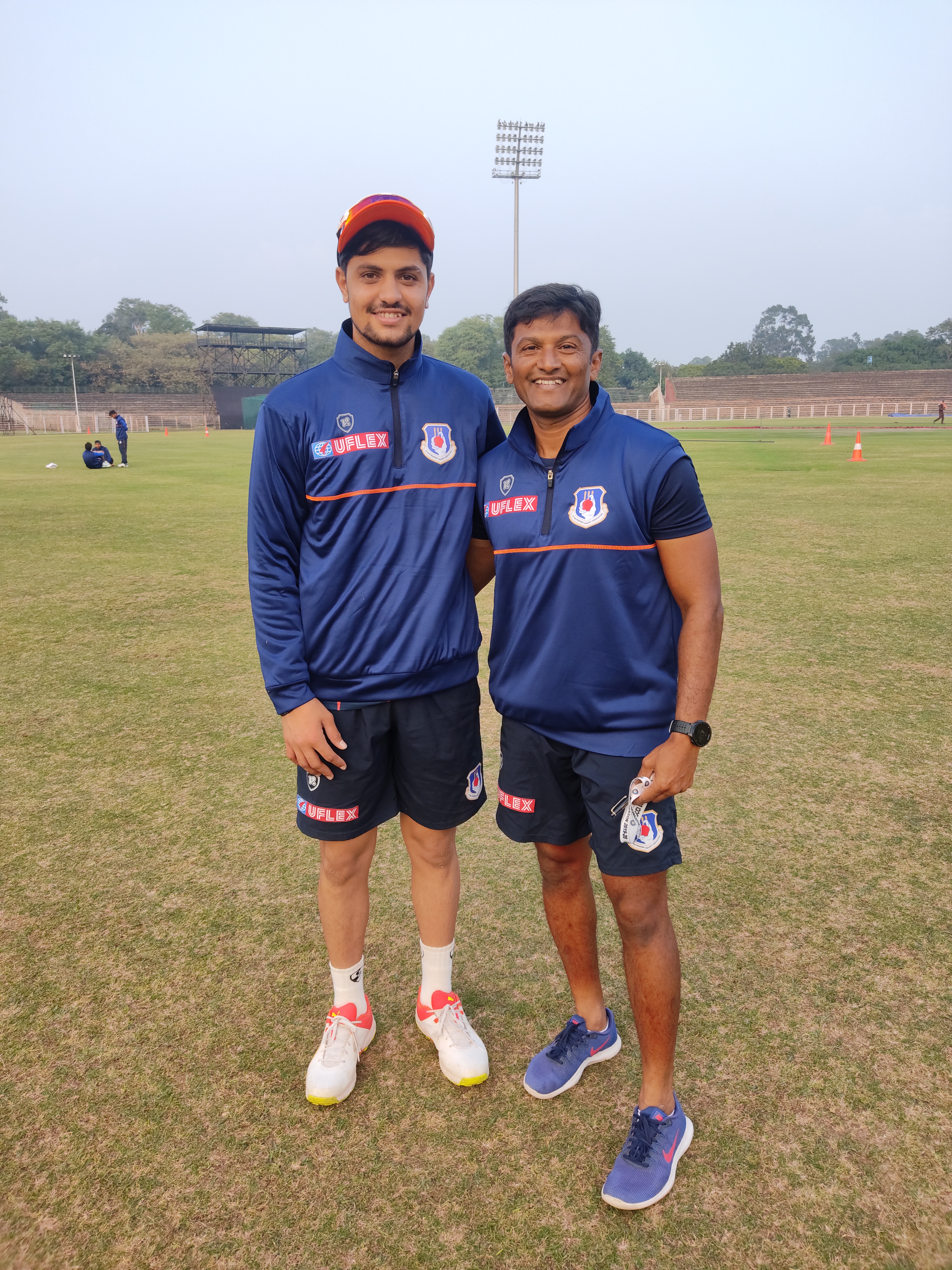
- Sameer Rizvi (left) with Rashid Zirak

Personal information
- Born: 6 December 2003 (age 22); Meerut, Uttar Pradesh, India
- Batting: Right-handed
- Bowling: Right arm off break

Domestic team information
- Years: Team
- 2020–present: Uttar Pradesh
- 2024: Chennai Super Kings (squad no. 1)
- 2025–present: Delhi Capitals (squad no. 1)

Career statistics
Competition	FC	LA	T20
Matches	9	14	30
Runs scored	152	358	504
Batting average	11.69	35.80	29.64
100s/50s	0/0	1/1	0/2
Top score	30	105	75*
Catches/stumpings	6/–	6/–	8/–
- Source: ESPNcricinfo, 9 April 2025

Sameer Rizvi (born 6 December 2003) is an Indian cricketer who plays for Uttar Pradesh in domestic cricket. He has also played age-group cricket representing India at Under-19 level.

== Early life ==
Rizvi began playing cricket at the age of eleven, and began practicing the sport at Gandhibagh Academy in Meerut, where he was coached by his maternal uncle Tankeeb Akhtar, who inspired Sameer to take up cricket seriously. Akhtar also faced the wrath of Sameer's father for distracting Sameer from focusing on studies. In a Ranji Trophy match between Uttar Pradesh and Saurashtra in 2011, Rizvi got the attention of Uttar Pradesh captain Suresh Raina, who was impressed by the eight-year-old Rizvi's fielding efforts. Raina eventually spotted the talent in Rizvi and gifted him his sunglasses.

Rizvi used to open the batting till the Under-16 level, but he was convinced to bat at the middle order by one of his coaches after witnessing his natural game of batting against spin bowling. Over the years, he raised his reputation for big hitting. He is reported to have commenced his education quite late in his career and completed his class 10 exams only after turning 20.

He stepped up as the main breadwinner of his family after his father was diagnosed with a brain haemorrhage in 2020.

== Career ==
Rizvi made his first-class debut on 27 January 2020 at the age of 16, for Uttar Pradesh in the 2019–20 Ranji Trophy. At age 20, he gained attention in the UP T20 League. He made his List A debut on 11 December 2021, for Uttar Pradesh in the 2021–22 Vijay Hazare Trophy. He made headlines in social circles in the 2023 UP T20 League, where he piled up 455 runs in nine innings during the tournament, including two centuries (which also included the fastest century of the tournament coming in only 47 deliveries) while playing for the Kanpur Superstars, and he also raised his bar by being the most prolific six-hitter for his team during the competition. His batting skills during the UP T20 League caught the attention of some of the IPL franchises including Punjab Kings, Royal Challengers Bangalore and Rajasthan Royals who asked him to attend the trials. However, he had to miss the trials due to his commitments with the Under-23 squad of Uttar Pradesh.In December 2024, Sameer Rizvi scored the fastest double century in U23 State A Trophy.

== Franchise Career ==
In December 2023, he was bought for the record price of 8.40 crore by the Chennai Super Kings in the auction for the 2024 Indian Premier League tournament. He became the highest earning, most expensive uncapped player in the 2024 IPL auction.
