= Prince Yadav =

Indian cricketer (born 1996)

Personal information
- Full name: Prince Ram Niwas Yadav
- Born: 10 June 1996 (age 30); Najafgarh, Delhi, India
- Batting: Right-handed
- Bowling: Right-arm fast
- Role: Bowler

International information
- National side: India (2026–present)
- ODI debut (cap 263): 17 June 2026 v Afghanistan
- Last ODI: 19 July 2026 v England
- ODI shirt no.: 16
- T20I debut (cap 121): 28 June 2026 v Ireland
- Last T20I: 24 October 2026 v New Zealand
- T20I shirt no.: 16

Domestic team information
- Years: Team
- 2024–present: Delhi
- 2025–present: Lucknow Super Giants

Career statistics
Competition	ODI	T20I	LA	T20
Matches	3	6	17	41
Runs scored	5	8	14	41
Batting average	5	-	7	20.50
100s/50s	0/0	0/0	0/0	0/0
Top score	5*	6*	5	17*
Balls bowled	147	122	832	892
Wickets	4	9	33	47
Bowling average	43.25	18.77	23.09	27.25
5 wickets in innings	0	0	0	0
10 wickets in match	0	0	0	0
Best bowling	2/56	3/22	4/53	3/22
Catches/stumpings	3/–	-/–	7/–	17/–
- Source: Cricinfo, 24 October 2026

Prince Ram Niwas Yadav (born 10 June 1996) is an Indian cricketer who plays for the Indian national team as a right-arm fast bowler. He represents Delhi in domestic cricket and Lucknow Super Giants in the Indian Premier League.

== Early life ==
Yadav was born in Dariyapur Khurd, a village near Najafgarh in Delhi. His father, Ram Niwas Yadav, worked in the Indian Railways and later took up farming after retirement, while his sister is a government school teacher. He played only tennis ball cricket until the age of 17 and had not touched a leather ball before that.

== Domestic career ==
Yadav made his first-class debut for Delhi against Jammu & Kashmir in the 2023–24 Ranji Trophy on 12 January 2024.

In the 2024 season of the Delhi Premier League T20, he played for Purani Delhi 6 which was being led by Rishabh Pant. He ended his season with 13 wickets in 10 matches. Following this performance, he earned his white-ball call-up for Delhi, for whom he had already represented in the Ranji Trophy.

He made his T20 debut for Delhi against Uttar Pradesh on 23 November 2024 in the 2024–25 Syed Mushtaq Ali Trophy. The match was a day before the 2025 IPL Mega Auction. He picked up two crucial wickets in the match to seal the win for Delhi. On the next day, he was picked up by Lucknow Super Giants in the 2025 IPL Mega Auction for a price of ₹30 Lakhs.

He went on to take a total of 11 wickets in his debut SMAT season with an economy rate of 7.54. He was Delhi's highest wicket taker of the tournament and helped them to reach the semi-final.

He later made his List A debut for Delhi against Bengal on 21 December 2024 in the 2024–25 Vijay Hazare Trophy. He finished his VHT season with 11 wickets in 6 matches at an average of 22.00.

He made his Indian Premier League debut against Delhi Capitals on the 4th match of the tournament on 24 March 2025. He was later retained by LSG for the 2026 IPL season.

== International career ==
He received his maiden national team call-up in May 2026 for the ODI series against Afghanistan. He made his ODI debut during the 2nd match of the series on 17 June 2026, where he picked up two wickets. During the same month, he was picked up for the two match T20I away series against Ireland. He made his T20I debut on the 2nd match on 28 June 2026 and took three wickets. He smashed a six on his very first ball of the format, which made him only the third Indian after Suryakumar Yadav and Ramandeep Singh to hit a six on the first ball of their T20I career.

== Age fraud ==
Yadav was banned from participating in 2020/21 and 2021/22 domestic cricket seasons by the Board of Control for Cricket in India (BCCI), after being found guilty of age fudging. He submitted a birth certificate to the BCCI in which his date of birth was shown to be 12 December 2001. But the BCCI acted on the basis of his class tenth certificate issued by the Central Board of Secondary Education in which his actual date of birth was found to be 10 June 1996.
