= Digvesh Rathi =

Indian cricketer (born 1999)

Digvesh Singh Rathi
Personal information
- Full name: Digvesh Singh Rathi
- Born: 15 December 1999 (age 26); Delhi, India
- Batting: Right-handed
- Bowling: Right-arm legbreak
- Role: Bowler

Domestic team information
- Years: Team
- 2024/25: Delhi
- 2025-: Lucknow Super Giants (squad no. 74)

Career statistics
Competition	Twenty20
Matches	12
Runs scored	1
Batting average	1.00
100s/50s	0/0
Top score	1
Balls bowled	282
Wickets	13
Bowling average	25.30
5 wickets in innings	0
10 wickets in match	0
Best bowling	2/8
Catches/stumpings	2/–
- Source: ESPNcricinfo, 4 May 2025

Digvesh Singh Rathi (born 15 December 1999) is an Indian cricketer, who plays as a leg break bowler. He plays for Delhi in domestic cricket and Lucknow Super Giants in the Indian Premier League.

== Career ==
Rathi made his Twenty20 career debut on 29 November 2024, in the 2024-25 Syed Mushtaq Ali Trophy.

=== IPL ===
Rathi was signed up by Lucknow Super Giants for ₹30 lakh in the auction. He made his IPL debut for the Lucknow Super Giants in a match against Delhi Capitals. Bowling his third delivery in the IPL, he got the wicket of Delhi Capitals captain Axar Patel.

Rathi's 'writing in the notebook' celebration earned him fines on three occasions during the 2025 IPL season. After the third infraction, Rathi was suspended for one game.
