= Akash Singh (cricketer, born 2002) =

Indian cricketer (born 2002)

Personal information
- Full name: Akash Maharaj Singh
- Born: 26 April 2002 (age 24); Bharatpur, Rajasthan, India
- Batting: Right-handed
- Bowling: Left-arm medium-fast
- Role: Bowler

Domestic team information
- Years: Team
- 2019–2021: Rajasthan
- 2021: Rajasthan Royals
- 2022–present: Baroda
- 2023: Chennai Super Kings
- 2024: Sunrisers Hyderabad
- 2025: Lucknow Super Giants
- Source: ESPNcricinfo, 6 June 2021

Akash Singh (born 26 April 2002) is an Indian cricketer who plays for Baroda in domestic cricket and Lucknow Super Giants in Indian Premier League.

== Career ==
Akash made his Twenty20 debut on 9 November 2019, for Rajasthan in the 2019–20 Syed Mushtaq Ali Trophy. Prior to his Twenty20 debut, he represented the India under-19 cricket team in the 2019 ACC Under-19 Asia Cup in September 2019, playing in three matches during the tournament. He was also called up to the India B cricket team for the U19 Challenger Cup. In December 2019, he was named in India's squad for the 2020 Under-19 Cricket World Cup.

In the 2020 IPL auction, he was bought by the Rajasthan Royals ahead of the 2020 Indian Premier League but was released before the next auction. In February 2021, Singh was bought again by the Rajasthan Royals in the IPL auction ahead of the 2021 Indian Premier League. He made his List A debut on 23 February 2021, for Rajasthan in the 2020–21 Vijay Hazare Trophy.In Indian Premier League 2023, Akash Singh was signed by Chennai Super Kings to replace their bowler Mukesh Choudhary who got injured
