= 2026 Mumbai Indians season =

Indian Premier League cricket team

Mumbai Indians
2026 season
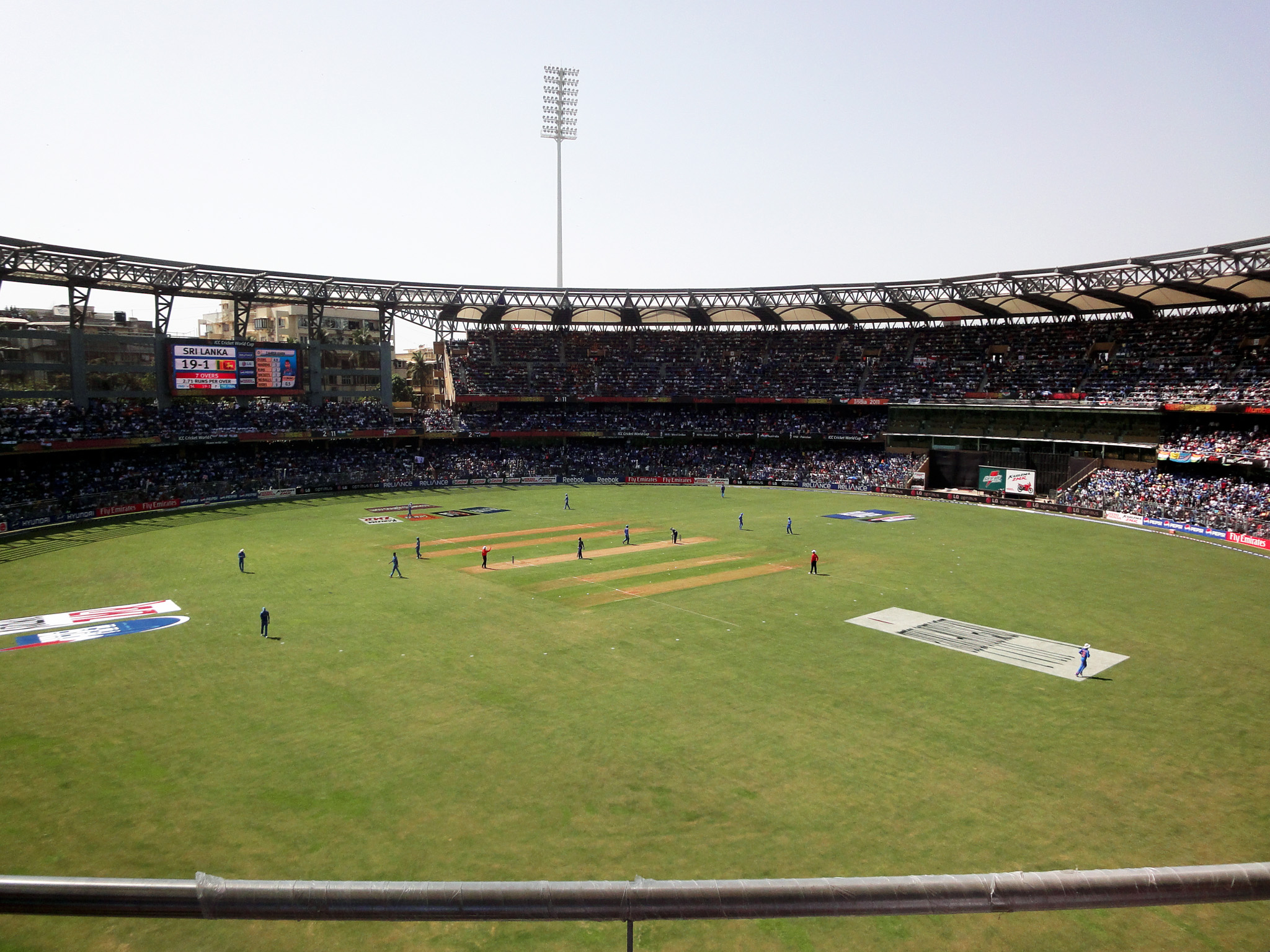
- Wankhede Stadium, home ground of Mumbai Indians
- Coach: Mahela Jayawardene
- Captain: Hardik Pandya
- Ground(s): Wankhede Stadium, Mumbai
- League stage: 9th place
- Most runs: Ryan Rickelton (448)
- Most wickets: Allah Ghazanfar (15)
- Most catches: Tilak Varma (12)
- Most wicket-keeping dismissals: Ryan Rickelton (9)

The 2026 season was Mumbai Indians' nineteenth appearance in the Indian Premier League (IPL). They were one of the ten cricket teams that competed in the 2026 IPL. The team was captained by Hardik Pandya and coached by Mahela Jayawardene.

Mumbai Indians were the second team to be eliminated from the 2026 IPL and finished the season in ninth place with four wins from 14 matches. Ryan Rickelton scored the most runs (448) while Allah Ghazanfar took the most wickets (15) for Mumbai in the 2026 season.

== Pre-season ==
The 2026 Indian Premier League was the 19th edition of the Indian Premier League (IPL), a professional Twenty20 (T20) cricket league held in India, organised by the Board of Control for Cricket in India (BCCI). Mumbai Indians are the joint-most successful franchise with 5 title wins. The team finished in fourth place in the previous season. The tournament featured ten teams competing in 74 matches from 28 March to 31 May 2026. Mumbai played all their home matches at Wankhede Stadium.

=== Player retention ===
Franchises were allowed to retain any number of players from their squad. Franchises were required to submit their retention lists before 15 November 2025. Mumbai retained twenty players, including captain Hardik Pandya and former captain Rohit Sharma. Mumbai traded in Shardul Thakur from Lucknow Super Giants, Sherfane Rutherford from Gujarat Titans and Mayank Markande from Kolkata Knight Riders. Mumbai also traded Arjun Tendulkar to Lucknow.

Retained players
Domestic		Overseas
Raj Angad Bawa; Jasprit Bumrah; Deepak Chahar; Naman Dhir; Ashwani Kumar; Mayank Markande (Note: Kolkata Knight Riders traded Mayank Markande to Mumbai Indians.); Robin Minz	Hardik Pandya; Raghu Sharma; Rohit Sharma; Shardul Thakur (Note: Lucknow Super Giants traded Shardul Thakur to Mumbai Indians.); Tilak Varma; Suryakumar Yadav	Corbin Bosch; Trent Boult; Allah Ghazanfar; Will Jacks; Ryan Rickelton; Sherfane Rutherford (Note: Gujarat Titans traded Sherfane Rutherford to Mumbai Indians.); Mitchell Santner

Released players
Batters	Wicket-keepers	All-rounders	Bowlers
Bevon Jacobs	Jonny Bairstow; Krishnan Shrijith	Charith Asalanka	Richard Gleeson; Vignesh Puthur; Mujeeb Ur Rahman; Satyanarayana Raju; Karn Sharma; Arjun Tendulkar (Note: Mumbai Indians traded Arjun Tendulkar to Lucknow Super Giants.); Reece Topley; Lizaad Williams

=== Auction ===
The season's auction took place on 16 December 2025 in Abu Dhabi, United Arab Emirates. The auction purse for each franchise was set at ₹125 crore (US$13 million), with franchises being deducted an amount from the purse for every retained player. Mumbai had a purse remaining of ₹2.75 crore (US$290,000). Mumbai bought five players in the auction, including one capped overseas player.

Auctioned players
Domestic		Overseas	
Capped	Uncapped	Capped	Uncapped
—N/a	Atharva Ankolekar; Mohammad Izhar; Danish Malewar; Mayank Rawat	Quinton de Kock	—N/a

== Squad ==
- Players with international caps as of start of 2026 IPL are listed in **bold**.
- Ages are as of 28 March 2026.
- Withdrawn players are indicated by a dagger symbol (†) and placed at the bottom of the table.

Mumbai Indians squad for the 2026 Indian Premier League
S/N	Name	Nationality	Birth date	Batting style	Bowling style	Salary	Notes
6	Krish Bhagat	India	6 November 2004 (aged 21)	Right-handed	Right-arm medium	₹30 lakh (US$32,000)	Replacement (Note: Krish Bhagat replaced Atharva Ankolekar, after the latter withdrew due to knee injury.)
9	**Tilak Varma**	India	8 November 2002 (aged 23)	Left-handed	Right-arm off break	₹8 crore (US$850,000)	
13	Robin Minz	India	13 September 2002 (aged 23)	Left-handed	—N/a	₹65 lakh (US$69,000)	
18	**Trent Boult**	New Zealand	22 July 1989 (aged 36)	Right-handed	Left-arm medium-fast	₹12.50 crore (US$1.3 million)	Overseas
19	Naman Dhir	India	31 December 1999 (aged 26)	Right-handed	Right-arm off break	₹5.25 crore (US$560,000)	
22	**Will Jacks**	England	21 November 1998 (aged 27)	Right-handed	Right-arm off break	₹5.25 crore (US$560,000)	Overseas
33	**Hardik Pandya**	India	11 October 1993 (aged 32)	Right-handed	Right-arm medium-fast	₹16.35 crore (US$1.7 million)	Captain
37	**Corbin Bosch**	South Africa	10 September 1994 (aged 31)	Right-handed	Right-arm medium-fast	₹75 lakh (US$80,000)	Overseas
42	Ashwani Kumar	India	29 August 2001 (aged 24)	Left-handed	Left-arm medium-fast	₹30 lakh (US$32,000)	
44	**Ryan Rickelton**	South Africa	11 July 1996 (aged 29)	Left-handed	—N/a	₹1 crore (US$110,000)	Overseas
45	**Rohit Sharma**	India	30 April 1987 (aged 38)	Right-handed	Right-arm off break	₹16.3 crore (US$1.7 million)	
54	**Shardul Thakur**	India	16 October 1991 (aged 34)	Right-handed	Right-arm medium	₹2 crore (US$210,000)	
56	**Deepak Chahar**	India	7 August 1992 (aged 33)	Right-handed	Right-arm medium-fast	₹9.25 crore (US$990,000)	
63	**Suryakumar Yadav**	India	14 September 1990 (aged 35)	Right-handed	Right-arm off break	₹16.35 crore (US$1.7 million)	Stand-in captain (Note: Suryakumar Yadav captained Mumbai Indians against Lucknow Super Giants and Royal Challengers Bengaluru when Hardik Pandya was unavailable.)
68	**Sherfane Rutherford**	West Indies	15 August 1998 (aged 27)	Left-handed	Right-arm medium-fast	₹2.6 crore (US$280,000)	Overseas
93	**Jasprit Bumrah**	India	6 December 1993 (aged 32)	Right-handed	Right-arm medium-fast	₹18 crore (US$1.9 million)	Stand-in captain (Note: Jasprit Bumrah captained Mumbai Indians against Punjab Kings when both Hardik Pandya and Suryakumar Yadav were unavailable.)
—N/a	Ruchit Ahir	India	28 October 2000 (aged 25)	Right-handed	Right-arm medium-fast	₹30 lakh (US$32,000)	Replacement (Note: Ruchit Ahir replaced Raj Angad Bawa, after the latter withdrew due to ligament tear.)
—N/a	**Allah Ghazanfar**	Afghanistan	20 March 2006 (aged 20)	Right-handed	Right-arm off break	₹4.80 crore (US$510,000)	Overseas
—N/a	Mohammad Izhar	India	1 January 2004 (aged 22)	Right-handed	Left-arm medium	₹30 lakh (US$32,000)	
—N/a	Mahipal Lomror	India	16 November 1999 (aged 26)	Left-handed	Left-arm orthodox	₹50 lakh (US$53,000)	Replacement (Note: Mahipal Lomror replaced Quinton de Kock, after the latter withdrew due to wrist injury.)
—N/a	**Keshav Maharaj**	South Africa	7 February 1990 (aged 36)	Right-handed	Left-arm orthodox	₹75 lakh (US$80,000)	Overseas; replacement (Note: Keshav Maharaj replaced Mitchell Santner, after the latter withdrew due to shoulder injury.)
—N/a	Danish Malewar	India	8 October 2003 (aged 22)	Right-handed	Right-arm leg break	₹30 lakh (US$32,000)	
—N/a	**Mayank Markande**	India	11 November 1997 (aged 28)	Right-handed	Right-arm leg break	₹30 lakh (US$32,000)	
—N/a	Mayank Rawat	India	4 December 1999 (aged 26)	Right-handed	Right-arm off break	₹30 lakh (US$32,000)	
—N/a	Raghu Sharma	India	11 March 1993 (aged 33)	Right-handed	Right-arm leg break	₹30 lakh (US$32,000)	
12	Raj Angad Bawa †	India	12 November 2002 (aged 23)	Left-handed	Right-arm medium-fast	₹30 lakh (US$32,000)	Withdrawn
74	**Mitchell Santner** †	New Zealand	5 February 1992 (aged 34)	Left-handed	Left-arm orthodox	₹2 crore (US$210,000)	Overseas; withdrawn
—N/a	Atharva Ankolekar †	India	26 September 2000 (aged 25)	Left-handed	Left-arm orthodox	₹30 lakh (US$32,000)	Withdrawn
—N/a	**Quinton de Kock** †	South Africa	17 December 1992 (aged 33)	Left-handed	—N/a	₹1 crore (US$110,000)	Overseas; withdrawn

== Support staff ==
Position	Name
Head coach	Mahela Jayawardene
Batting coach	Kieron Pollard
Bowling coach	Lasith Malinga; Paras Mhambrey
Fielding coach	Carl Hopkinson

- Source: News18

== League stage ==
Mumbai Indians began their season with a win against Kolkata for the first time since the 2012 season. They lost their next four matches to Delhi Capitals, Rajasthan Royals, Royal Challengers Bengaluru and Punjab Kings. They won their next match against Gujarat; but lost the next three matches to Chennai Super Kings, Sunrisers Hyderabad and Chennai again. They won their next match against Lucknow, but lost to Bengaluru and were eliminated from the season. They won their next match against Punjab, but lost the last two matches of the season to Kolkata and Rajasthan to finish the league stage at the ninth place with eight points.

=== Points table ===
League stage standings
Pos	Grp	Team	Pld	W	L	NR	Pts	NRR	Qualification
1	A	Royal Challengers Bengaluru (C)	14	9	5	0	18	0.783	Advanced to Qualifier 1
2	B	Gujarat Titans (R)	14	9	5	0	18	0.695	Advanced to Qualifier 1
3	B	Sunrisers Hyderabad (4th)	14	9	5	0	18	0.524	Advanced to Eliminator
4	A	Rajasthan Royals (3rd)	14	8	6	0	16	0.189	Advanced to Eliminator
5	A	Punjab Kings	14	7	6	1	15	0.309	Eliminated
6	B	Delhi Capitals	14	7	7	0	14	−0.651	Eliminated
7	A	Kolkata Knight Riders	14	6	7	1	13	−0.147	Eliminated
8	A	Chennai Super Kings	14	6	8	0	12	−0.345	Eliminated
9	B	Mumbai Indians	14	4	10	0	8	−0.584	Eliminated
10	B	Lucknow Super Giants	14	4	10	0	8	−0.740	Eliminated

Source: ESPNcricinfo
Rules for classification: 1) Points; 2) Wins; 3) Net run rate; 4) Wickets taken per fair deliveries; 5) drawing lots
(C) Champions; (R) Runners-up

=== League progression ===
League progression
Team	Group matches														Playoffs		
Team	1	2	3	4	5	6	7	8	9	10	11	12	13	14	Q1/E	Q2	F
Mumbai Indians	2	2	2	2	2	4	4	4	4	6	6	8	8	8			

Win	Loss	No result

- Note: The total points at the end of each group match are listed.
- Note: Click on the points (group matches) or W/L (playoffs) to see the match summary.

=== Fixtures ===
Match 2
29 March 2026
19:30 (N)
Scorecard

Kolkata Knight Riders; 220/4 (20 overs)	v	Mumbai Indians (H); 224/4 (19.1 overs)
Ajinkya Rahane 67 (40); Shardul Thakur 3/39 (4 overs)		Ryan Rickelton 81 (43); Sunil Narine 1/30 (3 overs)

Mumbai Indians won by 6 wickets
Wankhede Stadium, Mumbai
Umpires: Saidarshan Kumar (Ind) and Anish Sahasrabudhe (Ind)
Player of the match: Shardul Thakur (Mumbai Indians)

- Mumbai Indians won the toss and elected to field.
- Mumbai Indians became the first franchise to play in 300 T20 matches.
- Allah Ghazanfar (Mumbai Indians), Finn Allen and Blessing Muzarabani (Kolkata Knight Riders) all made their IPL debuts.
- Ajinkya Rahane (Kolkata Knight Riders) played in his 200th IPL match.
- This was Mumbai Indians' highest successful run chase in the IPL.
- For the first time since the 2012 season, Mumbai Indians won their opening match.

Match 8
4 April 2026
15:30 (D/N)
Scorecard

Mumbai Indians; 162/6 (20 overs)	v	Delhi Capitals (H); 164/4 (18.1 overs)
Suryakumar Yadav 51 (36); Mukesh Kumar 2/26 (3 overs)		Sameer Rizvi 90 (51); Deepak Chahar 1/20 (3 overs)

Delhi Capitals won by 6 wickets
Arun Jaitley Stadium, Delhi
Umpires: Kumar Dharmasena (SL) and Mohit Krishnadas (Ind)
Player of the match: Sameer Rizvi (Delhi Capitals)

- Delhi Capitals won the toss and elected to field.

Match 13
7 April 2026
19:30 (N)
Scorecard

Rajasthan Royals (H); 150/3 (11 overs)	v	Mumbai Indians; 123/9 (11 overs)
Yashasvi Jaiswal 77* (32); Allah Ghazanfar 2/20 (2 overs)		Sherfane Rutherford 25 (8); Nandre Burger 2/21 (2 overs)

Rajasthan Royals won by 27 runs
ACA Cricket Stadium, Guwahati
Umpires: Kumar Dharmasena (SL) and Mohit Krishnadas (Ind)
Player of the match: Yashasvi Jaiswal (Rajasthan Royals)

- Mumbai Indians won the toss and elected to field.
- The match was reduced to 11 overs per side due to rain.
- Yashasvi Jaiswal (Rajasthan Royals) scored his 100th six in IPL.

Match 20
12 April 2026
19:30 (N)
Scorecard

Royal Challengers Bengaluru; 240/4 (20 overs)	v	Mumbai Indians (H); 222/5 (20 overs)
Phil Salt 78 (36); Shardul Thakur 1/32 (2 overs)		Sherfane Rutherford 71* (31); Suyash Sharma 2/47 (4 overs)

Royal Challengers Bengaluru won by 18 runs
Wankhede Stadium, Mumbai
Umpires: Swaroopanand Kannur (Ind) and Virender Sharma (Ind)
Player of the match: Phil Salt (Royal Challengers Bengaluru)

- Mumbai Indians won the toss and elected to field.

Match 24
16 April 2026
19:30 (N)
Scorecard

Mumbai Indians (H); 195/6 (20 overs)	v	Punjab Kings; 198/3 (16.3 overs)
Quinton de Kock 112* (60); Arshdeep Singh 3/22 (4 overs)		Prabhsimran Singh 80* (39); Allah Ghazanfar 2/31 (4 overs)

Punjab Kings won by 7 wickets
Wankhede Stadium, Mumbai
Umpires: Mohit Krishnadas (Ind) and Virender Sharma (Ind)
Player of the match: Arshdeep Singh (Punjab Kings)

- Punjab Kings won the toss and elected to field.

Match 30
20 April 2026
19:30 (N)
Scorecard

Mumbai Indians; 199/5 (20 overs)	v	Gujarat Titans (H); 100 (15.5 overs)
Tilak Varma 101* (45); Kagiso Rabada 3/33 (4 overs)		Washington Sundar 26 (17); Ashwani Kumar 4/24 (4 overs)

Mumbai Indians won by 99 runs
Narendra Modi Stadium, Ahmedabad
Umpires: Abhijit Bhattacharya (Ind) and K. N. Ananthapadmanabhan (Ind)
Player of the match: Tilak Varma (Mumbai Indians)

- Gujarat Titans won the toss and elected to field.
- Krish Bhagat and Danish Malewar (Mumbai Indians) both made their T20 debuts.
- Hardik Pandya became the seventh player to score 2,000 runs for Mumbai Indians in IPL.
- Tilak Varma (Mumbai Indians) scored his maiden century in IPL.

Match 33
23 April 2026
19:30 (N)
Scorecard

Chennai Super Kings; 207/6 (20 overs)	v	Mumbai Indians (H); 104 (19 overs)
Sanju Samson 101* (54); Allah Ghazanfar 2/25 (4 overs)		Tilak Varma 37 (29); Akeal Hosein 4/17 (4 overs)

Chennai Super Kings won by 103 runs
Wankhede Stadium, Mumbai
Umpires: Adrian Holdstock (SA) and Parashar Joshi (Ind)
Player of the match: Sanju Samson (Chennai Super Kings)

- Mumbai Indians won the toss and elected to field.
- Shardul Thakur replaced Mitchell Santner as a concussion substitute after the latter got injured during the first innings.
- This was Mumbai Indians' biggest defeat by a margin of runs.

Match 41
29 April 2026
19:30 (N)
Scorecard

Mumbai Indians (H); 243/5 (20 overs)	v	Sunrisers Hyderabad; 249/4 (18.4 overs)
Ryan Rickelton 123* (55); Praful Hinge 2/54 (4 overs)		Travis Head 76 (30); Allah Ghazanfar 2/51 (4 overs)

Sunrisers Hyderabad won by 6 wickets
Wankhede Stadium, Mumbai
Umpires: Abhijeet Bengeri (Ind) and Jayaraman Madanagopal (Ind)
Player of the match: Heinrich Klaasen (Sunrisers Hyderabad)

- Mumbai Indians won the toss and elected to bat.
- Ryan Rickelton (Mumbai Indians) scored his maiden century in IPL.

Match 44
2 May 2026
19:30 (N)
Scorecard

Mumbai Indians; 159/7 (20 overs)	v	Chennai Super Kings (H); 160/2 (18.1 overs)
Naman Dhir 57 (37); Anshul Kamboj 3/32 (4 overs)		Ruturaj Gaikwad 67* (47); Jasprit Bumrah 1/20 (3 overs)

Chennai Super Kings won by 8 wickets
M. A. Chidambaram Stadium, Chennai
Umpires: Kaushik Gandhi (Ind) and Nitin Menon (Ind)
Player of the match: Ruturaj Gaikwad (Chennai Super Kings)

- Mumbai Indians won the toss and elected to bat.
- Ramakrishna Ghosh (Chennai Super Kings) and Raghu Sharma (Mumbai Indians) both made their IPL debuts.

Match 47
4 May 2026
19:30 (N)
Scorecard

Lucknow Super Giants; 228/5 (20 overs)	v	Mumbai Indians (H); 229/4 (18.4 overs)
Nicholas Pooran 63 (21); Corbin Bosch 2/20 (2 overs)		Rohit Sharma 84 (44); Manimaran Siddharth 2/47 (4 overs)

Mumbai Indians won by 6 wickets
Wankhede Stadium, Mumbai
Umpires: Ajitesh Argal (Ind) and Sam Nogajski (Aus)
Player of the match: Ryan Rickelton (Mumbai Indians)

- Mumbai Indians won the toss and elected to field.
- Akshat Raghuwanshi (Lucknow Super Giants) made his IPL debut.

Match 54
10 May 2026
19:30 (N)
Scorecard

Mumbai Indians; 166/7 (20 overs)	v	Royal Challengers Bengaluru (H); 167/8 (20 overs)
Tilak Varma 57 (42); Bhuvneshwar Kumar 4/23 (4 overs)		Krunal Pandya 73 (46); Corbin Bosch 4/26 (4 overs)

Royal Challengers Bengaluru won by 2 wickets
Shaheed Veer Narayan Singh Stadium, Raipur
Umpires: Rohan Pandit (Ind) and Tanmay Srivastava (Ind)
Player of the match: Bhuvneshwar Kumar (Royal Challengers Bengaluru)

- Royal Challengers Bengaluru won the toss and elected to field.
- Mumbai Indians were eliminated as a result of this match.

Match 58
14 May 2026
19:30 (N)
Scorecard

Punjab Kings (H); 200/8 (20 overs)	v	Mumbai Indians; 205/4 (19.5 overs)
Prabhsimran Singh 57 (32); Shardul Thakur 4/39 (4 overs)		Tilak Varma 75* (33); Azmatullah Omarzai 2/36 (4 overs)

Mumbai Indians won by 6 wickets
HPCA Cricket Stadium, Dharamshala
Umpires: K. N. Ananthapadmanabhan (Ind) and Bhavesh Patel (Ind)
Player of the match: Tilak Varma (Mumbai Indians)

- Mumbai Indians won the toss and elected to field.

Match 65
20 May 2026
19:30 (N)
Scorecard

Mumbai Indians; 147/8 (20 overs)	v	Kolkata Knight Riders (H); 148/6 (18.5 overs)
Corbin Bosch 32* (18); Cameron Green 2/23 (3 overs)		Manish Pandey 45 (33); Corbin Bosch 3/30 (3 overs)

Kolkata Knight Riders won by 4 wickets
Eden Gardens, Kolkata
Umpires: Saiyed Khalid (Ind) and Kannur Swaroopanand (Ind)
Player of the match: Manish Pandey (Kolkata Knight Riders)

- Kolkata Knight Riders won the toss and elected to field.
- Tejasvi Singh Dahiya (Kolkata Knight Riders) made his IPL debut. He replaced Angkrish Raghuvanshi as a concussion substitute after the batter got injured during the first innings.

Match 69
24 May 2026
15:30 (D/N)
Scorecard

Rajasthan Royals; 205/8 (20 overs)	v	Mumbai Indians (H); 175/9 (20 overs)
Dhruv Jurel 38 (26); Shardul Thakur 2/41 (4 overs)		Suryakumar Yadav 60 (42); Jofra Archer 3/17 (4 overs)

Rajasthan Royals won by 30 runs
Wankhede Stadium, Mumbai
Umpires: Tony Ematty (Ind) and Rohan Pandit (Ind)
Player of the match: Jofra Archer (Rajasthan Royals)

- Mumbai Indians won the toss and elected to field.
- Rajasthan Royals qualified for the playoffs while Punjab Kings and Kolkata Knight Riders were eliminated as a result of this match.

== Statistics ==
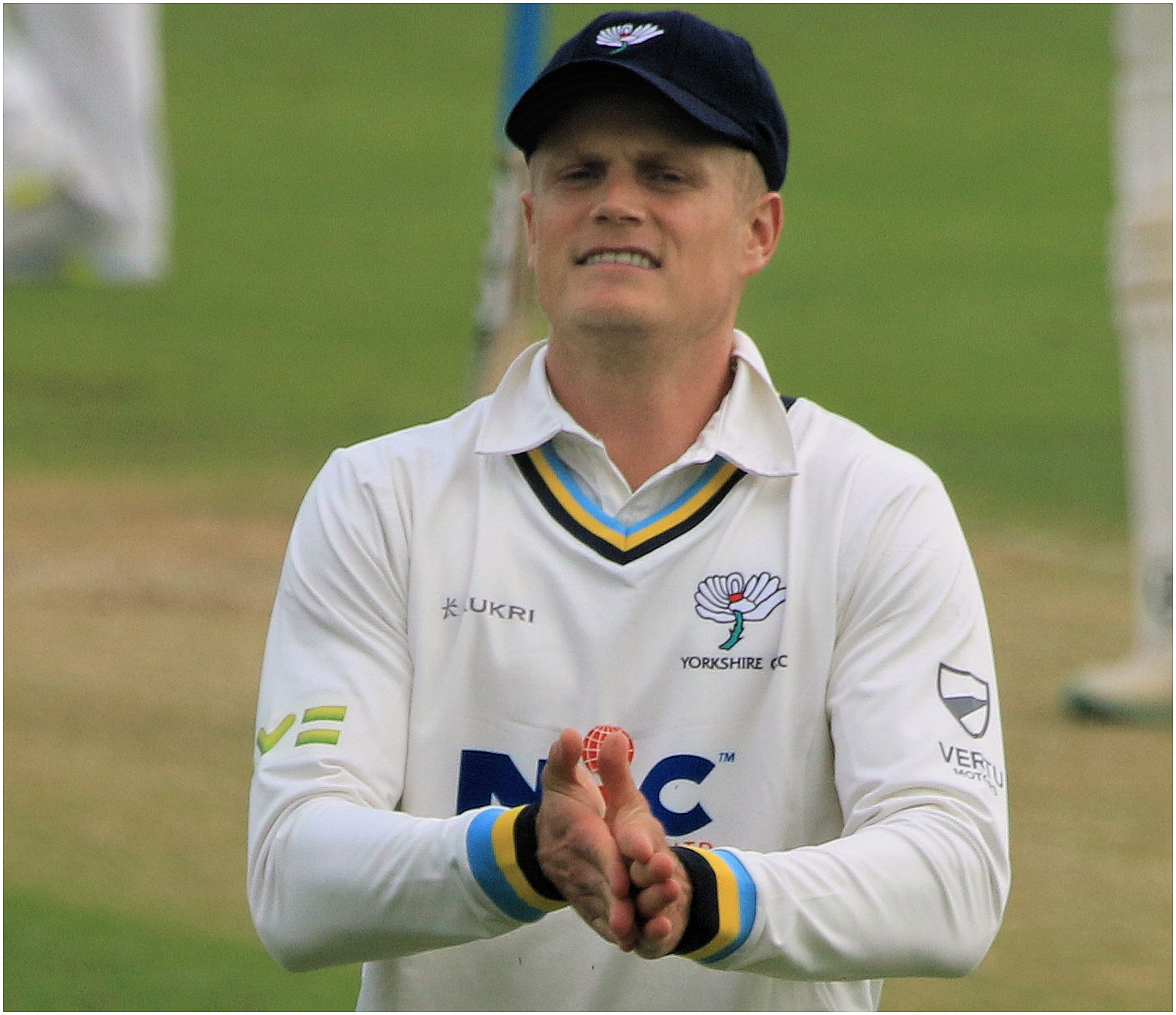
Ryan Rickelton scored the most runs (448) for Mumbai Indians in the 2026 Indian Premier League.

Most runs
Runs	Player
448	Ryan Rickelton
359	Tilak Varma
318	Naman Dhir
283	Rohit Sharma
270	Suryakumar Yadav

Most wickets
Wickets	Player
15	Allah Ghazanfar
12	Corbin Bosch
12	Shardul Thakur
8	Deepak Chahar
6	Ashwani Kumar
