= 2025 Mumbai Indians season =

Indian Premier League cricket team

Mumbai Indians
2025 season
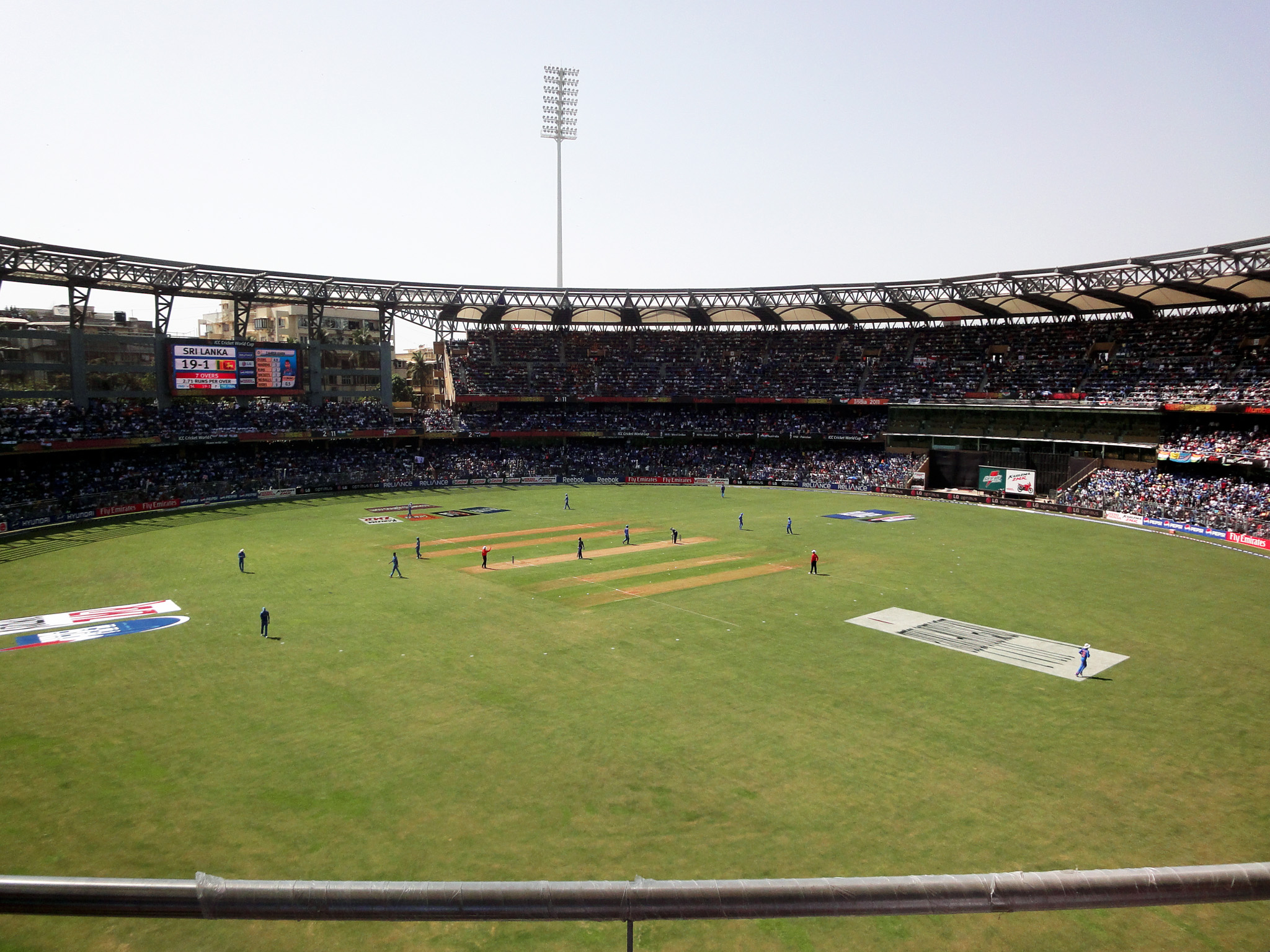
- Wankhede Stadium, home ground of Mumbai Indians
- Coach: Mahela Jayawardene
- Captain: Hardik Pandya
- Ground(s): Wankhede Stadium, Mumbai
- League stage: 4th place
- Eliminator: Won against Gujarat Titans
- Qualifier 2: Lost to Punjab Kings
- Most runs: Suryakumar Yadav (717)
- Most wickets: Trent Boult (22)
- Most catches: Naman Dhir (12)
- Most wicket-keeping dismissals: Ryan Rickelton (16)

The 2025 season was the 18th season for the Indian Premier League (IPL) cricket franchise Mumbai Indians. They were one of the ten teams that competed in the 2025 IPL. The team was captained by Hardik Pandya and coached by Mahela Jayawardene.

Mumbai Indians finished in fourth place in the league stage, and advanced to Eliminator in the playoffs. The team defeated Gujarat Titans in Eliminator but were defeated in Qualifier 2 by Punjab Kings. Suryakumar Yadav scored the most runs (717) while Trent Boult took the most wickets (22) for Mumbai in the 2025 season.

== Pre-season ==
The 2025 Indian Premier League was the 18th edition of the Indian Premier League (IPL), a professional Twenty20 (T20) cricket league, organised by the Board of Control for Cricket in India (BCCI). Mumbai Indians are the joint-most successful franchise with 5 title wins. They finished in tenth place in the previous season. The tournament featured ten teams competing in 74 matches from 22 March to 3 June 2025. Mumbai played all their home matches at Wankhede Stadium.

=== Player retention ===
Franchises were allowed to retain a maximum of six players from their squad, including a maximum of five recent international players. Franchises were required to submit their retention lists before 31 October 2024. Mumbai retained five players, including captain Hardik Pandya and former captain Rohit Sharma.

Retained players
No.	Player	Salary
1	Jasprit Bumrah	₹18 crore (US$1.9 million)
2	Suryakumar Yadav	₹16.35 crore (US$1.7 million)
3	Hardik Pandya	₹16.35 crore (US$1.7 million)
4	Rohit Sharma	₹16.3 crore (US$1.7 million)
5	Tilak Varma	₹8 crore (US$830,000)

Released players
Batters	Wicket-keepers	All-rounders	Fast bowlers	Spin bowlers
Tim David; Naman Dhir; Nehal Wadhera	Vishnu Vinod; Ishan Kishan; Harvik Desai	Dewald Brevis; Mohammad Nabi; Piyush Chawla; Romario Shepherd; Shams Mulani; Shreyas Gopal; Anshul Kamboj; Shivalik Sharma	Jason Behrendorff; Arjun Tendulkar; Akash Madhwal; Gerald Coetzee; Dilshan Madushanka; Nuwan Thushara; Luke Wood; Kwena Maphaka	Kumar Kartikeya

=== Auction ===
The season's auction took place on 24 and 25 November 2024 in Jeddah, Saudi Arabia. The auction purse for each franchise was set at ₹120 crore (US$12 million), with the franchises being deducted an amount from the purse for each retained player. Mumbai had a purse remaining of ₹45 crore (US$4.7 million). Franchises that did not retain six players, were allowed Right-to-Match (RTM) cards at the auction for each player not retained. Mumbai had one card available. Mumbai bought eighteen players in the auction, including eight capped players and eight overseas players. Mumbai used their RTM card to buy back Naman Dhir for ₹5.25 crore (US$550,000).

== Squad ==
- Players with international caps as of start of 2025 IPL are listed in **bold**.
- Ages are as of 22 March 2025.
- Withdrawn players are indicated by a dagger symbol (†) and placed at the bottom of the table.

Mumbai Indians squad for the 2025 Indian Premier League
S/N	Name	Nationality	Birth date	Batting style	Bowling style	Salary	Notes
9	**Tilak Varma**	India	8 November 2002 (aged 22)	Left-handed	Right-arm off break	₹8 crore (US$830,000)	
12	Raj Angad Bawa	India	12 November 2002 (aged 22)	Left-handed	Right-arm medium-fast	₹30 lakh (US$31,000)	
13	Robin Minz	India	13 September 2002 (aged 22)	Left-handed	—N/a	₹65 lakh (US$67,000)	
15	Satyanarayana Raju	India	10 July 1999 (aged 25)	Right-handed	Right-arm medium-fast	₹30 lakh (US$31,000)	
18	**Trent Boult**	New Zealand	22 July 1989 (aged 35)	Right-handed	Left-arm medium-fast	₹12.50 crore (US$1.3 million)	Overseas
19	Naman Dhir	India	31 December 1999 (aged 25)	Right-handed	Right-arm off break	₹5.25 crore (US$550,000)	
33	**Hardik Pandya**	India	11 October 1993 (aged 31)	Right-handed	Right-arm medium-fast	₹16.35 crore (US$1.7 million)	Captain
36	**Karn Sharma**	India	23 October 1987 (aged 37)	Left-handed	Right-arm leg break	₹50 lakh (US$52,000)	
42	Ashwani Kumar	India	29 August 2001 (aged 23)	Left-handed	Left-arm medium-fast	₹30 lakh (US$31,000)	
45	**Rohit Sharma**	India	30 April 1987 (aged 37)	Right-handed	Right-arm off break	₹16.3 crore (US$1.7 million)	
51	Jonny Bairstow	England	26 September 1989 (aged 35)	Right-handed	—N/a	₹5.25 crore (US$550,000)	Temporary (Note: Mumbai Indians signed Jonny Bairstow, Richard Gleeson and Charith Asalanka as temporary replacements, following the IPL's suspension and rescheduling.) replacement (Note: Jonny Bairstow replaced Will Jacks, after the latter withdrew due to national duty.)
56	**Deepak Chahar**	India	7 August 1992 (aged 32)	Right-handed	Right-arm medium-fast	₹9.25 crore (US$960,000)	
63	**Suryakumar Yadav**	India	14 September 1990 (aged 34)	Right-handed	Right-arm off break	₹16.35 crore (US$1.7 million)	Stand-in captain (Note: Suryakumar Yadav captained Mumbai Indians for the first match against Chennai Super Kings as Hardik Pandya was banned for slow over-rate in their last league stage game in 2024.)
74	**Mitchell Santner**	New Zealand	5 February 1992 (aged 33)	Left-handed	Left-arm orthodox	₹2 crore (US$210,000)	Overseas
77	**Mujeeb Ur Rahman**	Afghanistan	28 March 2001 (aged 23)	Right-handed	Right-arm off break	₹2 crore (US$210,000)	Overseas; replacement (Note: Mujeeb Ur Rahman replaced Allah Ghazanfar, after the latter withdrew due to back injury.)
93	**Jasprit Bumrah**	India	6 December 1993 (aged 31)	Right-handed	Right-arm medium-fast	₹18 crore (US$1.9 million)	
99	Arjun Tendulkar	India	24 September 1999 (aged 25)	Left-handed	Left-arm medium-fast	₹30 lakh (US$31,000)	
—N/a	Charith Asalanka	Sri Lanka	29 June 1997 (aged 27)	Left-handed	Right-arm off break	₹75 lakh (US$78,000)	Temporary replacement (Note: Charith Asalanka replaced Corbin Bosch, after the latter withdrew due to national duty.)
—N/a	Richard Gleeson	England	2 December 1987 (aged 37)	Right-handed	Right-arm fast-medium	₹1 crore (US$100,000)	Temporary replacement (Note: Richard Gleeson replaced Ryan Rickelton, after the latter withdrew due to national duty.)
—N/a	Bevon Jacobs	New Zealand	6 May 2002 (aged 22)	Right-handed	Right-arm medium-fast	₹30 lakh (US$31,000)	Overseas
—N/a	Raghu Sharma	India	11 March 1993 (aged 32)	Right-handed	Right-arm leg break	₹30 lakh (US$31,000)	Replacement (Note: Raghu Sharma replaced Vignesh Puthur, after the latter withdrew due to shin bones injury.)
—N/a	KL Shrijith	India	12 August 1996 (aged 28)	Left-handed	—N/a	₹30 lakh (US$31,000)	
—N/a	**Reece Topley**	England	21 February 1994 (aged 31)	Right-handed	Left-arm medium-fast	₹75 lakh (US$78,000)	Overseas
4	Vignesh Puthur †	India	2 March 2001 (aged 24)	Left-handed	Left-arm unorthodox	₹30 lakh (US$31,000)	Withdrawn
22	**Will Jacks** †	England	21 November 1998 (aged 26)	Right-handed	Right-arm off break	₹5.25 crore (US$550,000)	Overseas; withdrawn
37	**Corbin Bosch** †	South Africa	10 September 1994 (aged 30)	Right-handed	Right-arm medium-fast	₹75 lakh (US$78,000)	Overseas; replacement; (Note: Corbin Bosch replaced Lizaad Williams, after the latter withdrew due to knee injury.) withdrawn
44	**Ryan Rickelton** †	South Africa	11 July 1996 (aged 28)	Left-handed	—N/a	₹1 crore (US$100,000)	Overseas; withdrawn
—N/a	**Lizaad Williams** †	South Africa	1 October 1993 (aged 31)	Left-handed	Right-arm medium-fast	₹75 lakh (US$78,000)	Overseas; withdrawn
—N/a	**Allah Ghazanfar** †	Afghanistan	20 March 2006 (aged 19)	Right-handed	Right-arm off break	₹4.80 crore (US$500,000)	Overseas; withdrawn

== Support staff ==
Mahela Jayawardene returned as the head coach replacing Mark Boucher. Paras Mhambrey joined as a bowling coach while, Carl Hopkinson joined as a fielding coach replacing James Pamment.

Position	Name
Head coach	Mahela Jayawardene
Batting coach	Kieron Pollard
Bowling coach	Lasith Malinga; Paras Mhambrey
Fielding coach	Carl Hopkinson

- Source: Wisden

== League stage ==
Mumbai Indians began their season with two defeats against Chennai Super Kings and Gujarat Titans. They won against Kolkata Knight Riders but lost their next two matches to Lucknow Super Giants and Royal Challengers Bengaluru. Mumbai won their next six matches against Delhi Capitals, Sunrisers Hyderabad, Chennai, Hyderabad, Lucknow and Rajasthan Royals. They lost to Gujarat, won against Delhi and lost to Punjab Kings; to finish the league stage in fourth place with eight wins from 14 matches, and advanced to Eliminator in the playoffs.

=== Points table ===
League stage standings
Pos	Grp	Team	Pld	W	L	NR	Pts	NRR	Qualification
1	A	Punjab Kings	14	9	4	1	19	0.372	Advance to Qualifier 1
2	A	Royal Challengers Bengaluru	14	9	4	1	19	0.301	Advance to Qualifier 1
3	B	Gujarat Titans	14	9	5	0	18	0.254	Advance to Eliminator
4	B	Mumbai Indians	14	8	6	0	16	1.142	Advance to Eliminator
5	B	Delhi Capitals	14	7	6	1	15	−0.011	Eliminated
6	B	Sunrisers Hyderabad	14	6	7	1	13	−0.241	Eliminated
7	B	Lucknow Super Giants	14	6	8	0	12	−0.376	Eliminated
8	A	Kolkata Knight Riders	14	5	7	2	12	−0.305	Eliminated
9	A	Rajasthan Royals	14	4	10	0	8	−0.549	Eliminated
10	A	Chennai Super Kings	14	4	10	0	8	−0.647	Eliminated

Source: ESPNcricinfo

=== League progression ===
League progression
Team	Group matches														Playoffs		
Team	1	2	3	4	5	6	7	8	9	10	11	12	13	14	Q1/E	Q2	F
Mumbai Indians	0	0	2	2	2	4	6	8	10	12	14	14	16	16	W	L	

Win	Loss	No result

- Note: The total points at the end of each group match are listed.
- Note: Click on the points (group matches) or W/L (playoffs) to see the match summary.

=== Fixtures ===
Match 3
23 March 2025
19:30 (N)
Scorecard

Mumbai Indians; 155/9 (20 overs)	v	Chennai Super Kings (H); 158/6 (19.1 overs)
Tilak Varma 31 (25); Noor Ahmad 4/18 (4 overs)		Rachin Ravindra 65* (45); Vignesh Puthur 3/32 (4 overs)

Chennai Super Kings won by 4 wickets
M. A. Chidambaram Stadium, Chennai
Umpires: K. N. Ananthapadmanabhan (Ind) and Saiyed Khalid (Ind)
Player of the match: Noor Ahmad (Chennai Super Kings)

- Chennai Super Kings won the toss and elected to field.
- Vignesh Puthur (Mumbai Indians) made his T20 debut.
- Ryan Rickelton (Mumbai Indians) made his IPL debut.

Match 9
29 March 2025
19:30 (N)
Scorecard

Gujarat Titans (H); 196/8 (20 overs)	v	Mumbai Indians; 160/6 (20 overs)
Sai Sudharsan 63 (41); Hardik Pandya 2/29 (4 overs)		Suryakumar Yadav 48 (28); Prasidh Krishna 2/18 (4 overs)

Gujarat Titans won by 36 runs
Narendra Modi Stadium, Ahmedabad
Umpires: Abhijeet Bengeri (Ind) and Vinod Seshan (Ind)
Player of the match: Prasidh Krishna (Gujarat Titans)

- Mumbai Indians won the toss and elected to field.

Match 12
31 March 2025
19:30 (N)
Scorecard

Kolkata Knight Riders; 116 (16.2 overs)	v	Mumbai Indians (H); 121/2 (12.5 overs)
Angkrish Raghuvanshi 26 (16); Ashwani Kumar 4/24 (3 overs)		Ryan Rickelton 62* (41); Andre Russell 2/35 (2.5 overs)

Mumbai Indians won by 8 wickets
Wankhede Stadium, Mumbai
Umpires: Saiyed Khalid (Ind) and Saidharshan Kumar (Ind)
Player of the match: Ashwani Kumar (Mumbai Indians)

- Mumbai Indians won the toss and elected to field.
- Ashwani Kumar (Mumbai Indians) made his IPL debut.

Match 16
4 April 2025
19:30 (N)
Scorecard

Lucknow Super Giants (H); 203/8 (20 overs)	v	Mumbai Indians; 191/5 (20 overs)
Mitchell Marsh 60 (31); Hardik Pandya 5/36 (4 overs)		Suryakumar Yadav 67 (43); Digvesh Rathi 1/21 (4 overs)

Lucknow Super Giants won by 12 runs
Ekana Cricket Stadium, Lucknow
Umpires: Nitin Menon (Ind) and Saidharshan Kumar (Ind)
Player of the match: Digvesh Rathi (Lucknow Super Giants)

- Mumbai Indians won the toss and elected to field.

Match 20
7 April 2025
19:30 (N)
Scorecard

Royal Challengers Bengaluru; 221/5 (20 overs)	v	Mumbai Indians (H); 209/9 (20 overs)
Virat Kohli 67 (42); Hardik Pandya 2/45 (4 overs)		Tilak Varma 56 (29); Krunal Pandya 4/45 (4 overs)

Royal Challengers Bengaluru won by 12 runs
Wankhede Stadium, Mumbai
Umpires: Parashar Joshi (Ind) and Vinod Seshan (Ind)
Player of the match: Rajat Patidar (Royal Challengers Bengaluru)

- Mumbai Indians won the toss and elected to field.

Match 29
13 April 2025
19:30 (N)
Scorecard

Mumbai Indians; 205/5 (20 overs)	v	Delhi Capitals (H); 193 (19 overs)
Tilak Varma 59 (33); Kuldeep Yadav 2/23 (4 overs)		Karun Nair 89 (40); Karn Sharma 3/36 (4 overs)

Mumbai Indians won by 12 runs
Arun Jaitley Stadium, Delhi
Umpires: Chris Gaffaney (NZ) and Vinod Seshan (Ind)
Player of the match: Karn Sharma (Mumbai Indians)

- Delhi Capitals won the toss and elected to field.

Match 33
17 April 2025
19:30 (N)
Scorecard

Sunrisers Hyderabad; 162/5 (20 overs)	v	Mumbai Indians (H); 166/6 (18.1 overs)
Abhishek Sharma 40 (28); Will Jacks 2/14 (3 overs)		Will Jacks 36 (26); Pat Cummins 3/26 (4 overs)

Mumbai Indians won by 4 wickets
Wankhede Stadium, Mumbai
Umpires: Jayaraman Madanagopal (Ind) and Vinod Seshan (Ind)
Player of the match: Will Jacks (Mumbai Indians)

- Mumbai Indians won the toss and elected to field.

Match 38
20 April 2025
19:30 (N)
Scorecard

Chennai Super Kings; 176/5 (20 overs)	v	Mumbai Indians (H); 177/1 (15.4 overs)
Ravindra Jadeja 53* (35); Jasprit Bumrah 2/25 (4 overs)		Rohit Sharma 76* (45); Ravindra Jadeja 1/28 (3 overs)

Mumbai Indians won by 9 wickets
Wankhede Stadium, Mumbai
Umpires: Abhijit Bhattacharya (Ind) and Virender Sharma (Ind)
Player of the match: Rohit Sharma (Mumbai Indians)

- Mumbai Indians won the toss and elected to field.
- Ayush Mhatre (Chennai Super Kings) made his T20 debut.

Match 41
23 April 2025
19:30 (N)
Scorecard

Sunrisers Hyderabad (H); 143/8 (20 overs)	v	Mumbai Indians; 146/3 (15.4 overs)
Heinrich Klaasen 71 (44); Trent Boult 4/26 (4 overs)		Rohit Sharma 70 (46); Jaydev Unadkat 1/25 (3 overs)

Mumbai Indians won by 7 wickets
Rajiv Gandhi International Cricket Stadium, Hyderabad
Umpires: Jayaraman Madanagopal (Ind) and Vinod Seshan (Ind)
Player of the match: Trent Boult (Mumbai Indians)

- Mumbai Indians won the toss and elected to field.

Match 45
27 April 2025
15:30 (D/N)
Scorecard

Mumbai Indians (H); 215/7 (20 overs)	v	Lucknow Super Giants; 161 (20 overs)
Ryan Rickelton 58 (32); Mayank Yadav 2/40 (4 overs)		Ayush Badoni 35 (22); Jasprit Bumrah 4/22 (4 overs)

Mumbai Indians won by 54 runs
Wankhede Stadium, Mumbai
Umpires: Chris Gaffaney (NZ) and Jayaraman Madanagopal (Ind)
Player of the match: Will Jacks (Mumbai Indians)

- Lucknow Super Giants won the toss and elected to field.
- Corbin Bosch (Mumbai Indians) made his IPL debut.

Match 50
1 May 2025
19:30 (N)
Scorecard

Mumbai Indians; 217/2 (20 overs)	v	Rajasthan Royals (H); 117 (16.1 overs)
Ryan Rickelton 61 (38); Riyan Parag 1/12 (2 overs)		Jofra Archer 30 (27); Karn Sharma 3/23 (4 overs)

Mumbai Indians won by 100 runs
Sawai Mansingh Stadium, Jaipur
Umpires: Parashar Joshi (Ind) and Vinod Seshan (Ind)
Player of the match: Ryan Rickelton (Mumbai Indians)

- Rajasthan Royals won the toss and elected to field.
- Rajasthan Royals were eliminated as a result of this match.

Match 56
6 May 2025
19:30 (N)
Scorecard

Mumbai Indians (H); 155/8 (20 overs)	v	Gujarat Titans; 147/7 (19 overs)
Will Jacks 53 (35); Sai Kishore 2/34 (4 overs)		Shubman Gill 43 (46); Jasprit Bumrah 2/19 (4 overs)

Gujarat Titans won by 3 wickets (DLS method)
Wankhede Stadium, Mumbai
Umpires: Kaushik Gandhi (Ind) and Saidharshan Kumar (Ind)
Player of the match: Shubman Gill (Gujarat Titans)

- Gujarat Titans won the toss and elected to field.
- Gujarat Titans were set a revised target of 147 runs from 19 overs due to rain.

Match 63
21 May 2025
19:30 (N)
Scorecard

Mumbai Indians (H); 180/5 (20 overs)	v	Delhi Capitals; 121 (18.2 overs)
Suryakumar Yadav 73* (43); Mukesh Kumar 2/48 (4 overs)		Sameer Rizvi 39 (35); Mitchell Santner 3/11 (4 overs)

Mumbai Indians won by 59 runs
Wankhede Stadium, Mumbai
Umpires: Abhijeet Bengeri (Ind) and Jayaraman Madanagopal (Ind)
Player of the match: Suryakumar Yadav (Mumbai Indians)

- Delhi Capitals won the toss and elected to field.
- This match was originally scheduled for 15 May at the same venue, before being rescheduled.
- Madhav Tiwari (Delhi Capitals) made his T20 debut.
- Mumbai Indians qualified for the playoffs while Delhi Capitals were eliminated as a result of this match.

Match 69
26 May 2025
19:30 (N)
Scorecard

Mumbai Indians; 184/7 (20 overs)	v	Punjab Kings (H); 187/3 (18.3 overs)
Suryakumar Yadav 57 (39); Arshdeep Singh 2/28 (4 overs)		Josh Inglis 73 (42); Mitchell Santner 2/41 (4 overs)

Punjab Kings won by 7 wickets
Sawai Mansingh Stadium, Jaipur
Umpires: Chris Gaffaney (NZ) and Parashar Joshi (Ind)
Player of the match: Josh Inglis (Punjab Kings)

- Punjab Kings won the toss and elected to field.
- This match was originally scheduled for 11 May at the HPCA Cricket Stadium, before being rescheduled.

== Playoffs ==
=== Bracket ===
Qualifier 1
29 May 2025 – Mullanpur
1	Punjab Kings	101 (14.1 overs)
2	Royal Challengers Bengaluru	106/2 (10 overs)
Eliminator
30 May 2025 – Mullanpur
3	Gujarat Titans	208/6 (20 overs)
4	Mumbai Indians	228/5 (20 overs)

Qualifier 2
1 June 2025 – Ahmedabad
Q1L	Punjab Kings	207/5 (19 overs)
EW	Mumbai Indians	203/6 (20 overs)

Final
3 June 2025 – Ahmedabad
Q1W	Royal Challengers Bengaluru	190/9 (20 overs)
Q2W	Punjab Kings	184/7 (20 overs)

=== Eliminator ===
Eliminator
30 May 2025
19:30 (N)
Scorecard

Mumbai Indians; 228/5 (20 overs)	v	Gujarat Titans; 208/6 (20 overs)
Rohit Sharma 81 (50); Sai Kishore 2/42 (4 overs)		Sai Sudharsan 80 (49); Trent Boult 2/56 (4 overs)

Mumbai Indians won by 20 runs
Maharaja Yadavindra Singh International Cricket Stadium, Mullanpur
Umpires: Ulhas Gandhe (Ind) and Rohan Pandit (Ind)
Player of the match: Rohit Sharma (Mumbai Indians)

- Mumbai Indians won the toss and elected to bat.
- This match was originally scheduled for 21 May at the Rajiv Gandhi Stadium, before being rescheduled.
- Kusal Mendis (Gujarat Titans) made his IPL debut.

=== Qualifier 2 ===
Qualifier 2
1 June 2025
19:30 (N)
Scorecard

Mumbai Indians; 203/6 (20 overs)	v	Punjab Kings; 207/5 (19 overs)
Suryakumar Yadav 44 (26); Azmatullah Omarzai 2/43 (4 overs)		Shreyas Iyer 87* (41); Ashwani Kumar 2/55 (4 overs)

Punjab Kings won by 5 wickets
Narendra Modi Stadium, Ahmedabad
Umpires: Chris Gaffaney (NZ) and Nitin Menon (Ind)
Player of the match: Shreyas Iyer (Punjab Kings)

- Punjab Kings won the toss and elected to field.
- This match was originally scheduled for 23 May at the Eden Gardens, before being rescheduled.
- Punjab Kings qualified for their second IPL final after 2014.

== Statistics ==
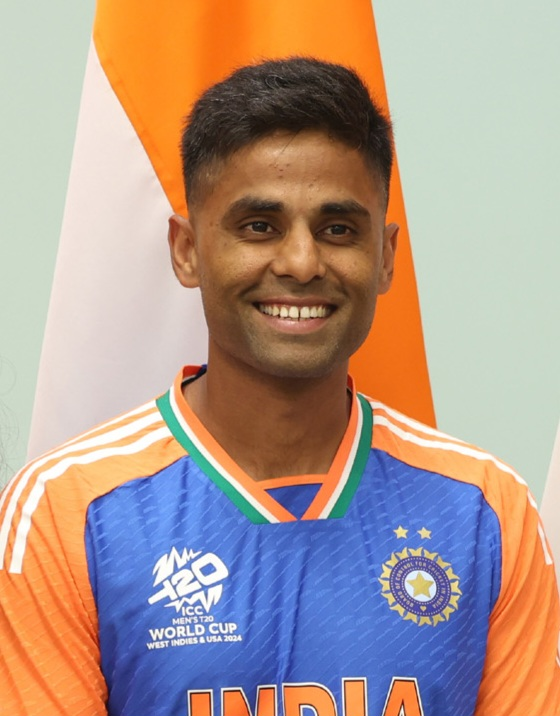
Suryakumar Yadav scored the most runs (717) for Mumbai Indians in the 2025 Indian Premier League.

At the IPL end of season awards, Suryakumar Yadav was awarded as the Most Valuable Player of the season.

Most runs
Runs	Player
717	Suryakumar Yadav
418	Rohit Sharma
388	Ryan Rickelton
343	Tilak Varma
252	Naman Dhir

Most wickets
Wickets	Player
22	Trent Boult
18	Jasprit Bumrah
14	Hardik Pandya
11	Deepak Chahar
11	Ashwani Kumar
