= 2019 Indian Premier League final =

- Match programme cover
- Event: 2019 Indian Premier League
Mumbai Indians	Chennai Super Kings
149/8	148/7
20 overs	20 overs
- Mumbai Indians won by 1 run
- Date: 12 May 2019
- Venue: Rajiv Gandhi International Cricket Stadium, Hyderabad
- Player of the match: Jasprit Bumrah (MI)
- Umpires: Ian Gould (Eng); Nitin Menon (Ind)
- Attendance: 53,560

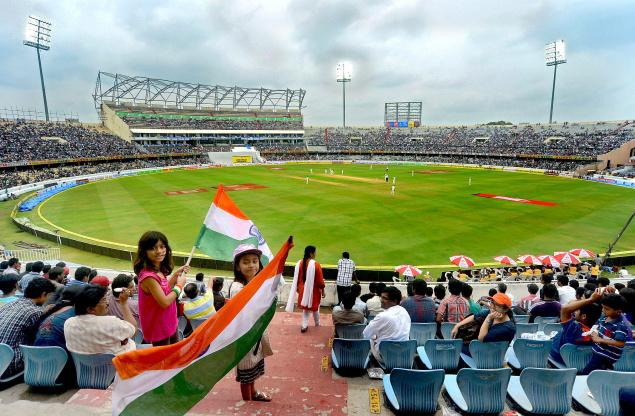
The venue of the final was shifted from M. A. Chidambaram Stadium to Rajiv Gandhi International Cricket Stadium.

The 2019 Indian Premier League final was a Twenty20 cricket match played between Chennai Super Kings and the Mumbai Indians on 12 May 2019 at the Rajiv Gandhi International Cricket Stadium in Hyderabad. It was the culmination of the 2019 season of the Indian Premier League (IPL), an annual Twenty20 tournament held in India. MI won the match by a single run and claimed their fourth Indian Premier League title.

The final was originally intended to be held at the M. A. Chidambaram Stadium in Chennai. In April 2019, however, the Board of Control for Cricket in India (BCCI) confirmed that alternative arrangements had been made, citing a long-standing issue of three closed stands at the original host stadium. Later in the same month, the Rajiv Gandhi International Cricket Stadium was confirmed as the venue for the final.

After winning the toss, MI elected to bat first. MI scored 149 runs for eight wickets in their 20 overs, Kieron Pollard top-scored with 41 runs. Chennai bowler Deepak Chahar took three wickets in the innings. In response, Chennai was guided by Shane Watson, who was the highest scorer of the match with 80 runs. Some tight bowling at the death, saw Chennai falling one run short with 148. Mumbai Indians' Jasprit Bumrah was awarded the player of the match for his spell of two for 14 in his four overs.

== Road to the final ==
Chennai Super Kings			vs	Mumbai Indians
League Stage
Opponent	Scorecard	Result	Titles	Opponent	Scorecard	Result
Royal Challengers Bangalore	23 March 2019	Won	Match 1	Delhi Capitals	24 March 2019	Lost
Delhi Capitals	26 March 2019	Won	Match 2	Royal Challengers Bangalore	28 March 2019	Won
Rajasthan Royals	31 March 2019	Won	Match 3	Kings XI Punjab	30 March 2019	Lost
Mumbai Indians	03 April 2019	Lost	Match 4	Chennai Super Kings	03 April 2019	Won
Kings XI Punjab	06 April 2019	Won	Match 5	Sunrisers Hyderabad	06 April 2019	Won
Kolkata Knight Riders	09 April 2019	Won	Match 6	Kings XI Punjab	10 April 2019	Won
Rajasthan Royals	11 April 2019	Won	Match 7	Rajasthan Royals	13 April 2019	Lost
Kolkata Knight Riders	14 April 2019	Won	Match 8	Royal Challengers Bangalore	15 April 2019	Won
Sunrisers Hyderabad	17 April 2019	Lost	Match 9	Delhi Capitals	18 April 2019	Won
Royal Challengers Bangalore	21 April 2019	Lost	Match 10	Rajasthan Royals	20 April 2019	Lost
Sunrisers Hyderabad	23 April 2019	Won	Match 11	Chennai Super Kings	26 April 2019	Won
Mumbai Indians	26 April 2019	Lost	Match 12	Kolkata Knight Riders	28 April 2019	Lost
Delhi Capitals	1 May 2019	Won	Match 13	Sunrisers Hyderabad	2 May 2019	Won
Kings XI Punjab	5 May 2019	Lost	Match 14	Kolkata Knight Riders	5 May 2019	Won
Playoff stage
Qualifier 1				Qualifier 1
Opponent	Scorecard	Result	Titles	Opponent	Scorecard	Result
Mumbai Indians	7 May 2019	Lost	Match 15	Chennai Super Kings	7 May 2019	Won
Qualifier 2
Delhi Capitals	10 May 2019	Won	Match 16
2019 Indian Premier League final

=== Group stage ===
Mumbai Indians were ranked first in the league table, though their campaign started with a loss (by 36 runs) to Delhi Capitals. After getting defeated by Kings XI Punjab, they went on to win their next three matches against Super Kings, Sunrisers and Kings XI. Mumbai had a successful second half of the league stage with five wins out of seven matches. In the group stage, they won nine matches out of fourteen and qualified for the playoffs.

Chennai Super Kings started their season campaign with a seven-wicket win over the Royal Challengers Bangalore. Chennai had a successful first half of the season with six wins out of seven matches, which included an opening three consecutive wins. Their run was finally ended by Mumbai. The wins displayed a mixture of both batting and bowling strength, with MS Dhoni taking the main batting role in his team, actively supported by Shane Watson and the bowlers Imran Tahir and Harbhajan Singh. Chennai finished the group stage with nine wins from fourteen matches, and were ranked second in the league table.

=== Group stage series ===
3 April
20:00 (D/N)
Scorecard

(H) Mumbai Indians; 170/5 (20 overs)	v	Chennai Super Kings; 133/8 (20 overs)

Mumbai won by 37 runs
Wankhede Stadium, Mumbai

26 April
20:00 (D/N)
Scorecard

Mumbai Indians; 155/4 (20 overs)	v	Chennai Super Kings (H); 109 (17.4 overs)

Mumbai won by 46 runs
M. A. Chidambaram Stadium, Chennai

Mumbai Indians won the two group stage matches between the finalists, winning the first group stage series match by 37 runs. Suryakumar Yadav scored a half-century and Hardik Pandya scored 25 runs from 8 balls (Mumbai scored 45 runs in the final two overs) to set Chennai a target of 171. Chennai did not start well, and despite Kedar Jadhav scoring 58 runs and forging a 54-run partnership with MS Dhoni, they finished well short. Both Hardik and Lasith Malinga took three wickets, while Jason Behrendorff took two wickets for Mumbai.

=== Playoffs ===
The playoff stage of IPL was played according to the Page playoff system and provided Mumbai and Chennai, being the top and second-ranked teams, with two chances for qualifying for the Final. These teams first faced each other in Qualifier 1, with the winners qualifying directly for the final; the loser of Qualifier 1 would then play against the winner of the Eliminator in Qualifier 2, with the winner of that match qualifying for the final.

7 May
19:30
Scorecard

Chennai Super Kings; 131/4 (20 overs)	v	Mumbai Indians; 132/4 (18.3 overs)

Mumbai won by 6 wickets
M. A. Chidambaram Stadium, Chennai

The Super Kings won the toss in Qualifier 1 and decided to bat first. The team lost Faf du Plessis early, and Shane Watson and Murali Vijay played cautiously in the beginning, but the Super Kings lost Watson to Krunal Pandya. The Super Kings made runs from their middle-order, with Ambati Rayudu and MS Dhoni scoring 42 and 37 runs respectively, to see the team amass 131 runs for the loss of 4 wickets. Rohit Sharma opened with Quinton de Kock to start the chase for the Mumbai Indians, but both departed early. Though Suryakumar Yadav started slowly, he hit out later against Super Kings bowlers to reach his half-century. After Ishan Kishan's departure, Hardik Pandya joined Yadav to complete the chase for the Mumbai Indians and secure their progression to the final.

Delhi Capitals won against Sunrisers Hyderabad in the Eliminator to set up a match against Chennai to decide the second finalist.

10 May
19:30 (D/N)
Scorecard

Delhi Capitals; 147/9 (20 overs)	v	Chennai Super Kings; 151/4 (19 overs)

Chennai won by 6 wickets
Dr. Y. S. Rajasekhara Reddy ACA–VDCA Cricket Stadium, Visakhapatnam

In Qualifier 2, Chennai captain MS Dhoni won the toss and elected to bowl. Delhi lost their both openers early and Rishabh Pant did not receive support from Delhi Capitals players, as wickets kept falling from the other end. Pant scored 38 runs before getting out in the 19th over. In the last over Ishant Sharma helped the Delhi Capitals to finish with 147 runs. Chasing 148 to win, Chennai openers Shane Watson and Faf du Plessis batted slowly and did not score many runs in the first couple of overs. In the final two powerplay overs, du Plesis took charge and changed the momentum of Chennai batting. The two openers put together an 81-run partnership and Chennai successfully chased their 148 run target with the loss of four wickets and qualified for their 8th IPL final.

== Match ==
=== Summary ===
Mumbai captain Rohit Sharma won the toss and elected to bat first on which he said, "This is a big game, that's what we prefer to do. We want to bat first, and set down the runs on the board." Chennai captain MS Dhoni said, "We were looking to bowl first. If the result is in your favour, then it’s fine, otherwise, they’ll say the guys are fatigued."

Rohit Sharma led Mumbai Indians became the IPL champion for the fourth time. Mumbai beat Chennai Super Kings by 1 run in a thrilling title match. Mumbai team after the end of IPL 2019 became the most successful team of IPL by winning the fourth title. After Mumbai, Chennai was second in terms of most IPL titles won (3). Chennai won three titles of IPL at that point of time. Mumbai presented 149 runs in the final match played at the Rajiv Gandhi International Cricket Stadium in Hyderabad. In reply, he Chennai team could manage, only 148 runs in the loss of 7 wickets in 20 overs despite the brilliant innings of Shane Watson (80). Watson hit 8 fours and 4 sixes in his 59-ball innings. Apart from this, Faf du Plessis (26), Suresh Raina (8), MS Dhoni (2), Ambati Rayudu scored 1 for Chennai. Rahul Chahar, Lasith Malinga and Krunal Pandya took one wicket each for Mumbai. There were four final matches between these two teams, out of which Mumbai won three while Chennai managed to win once.

=== Scorecard ===
- On-field umpires: Ian Gould (Eng) and Nitin Menon (Ind)
- Third umpire: Nigel Llong (Eng)
- Reserve umpire: C. K. Nandan (Ind)
- Match referee: Javagal Srinath (Ind)
- Toss: Mumbai Indians won the toss and elected to bat.
- Result: Mumbai Indians won by 1 run and won the 2019 Indian Premier League.

MI Batting Innings
Batsman	Dismissal	Runs	Balls	Four	Six	Strike rate
Quinton de Kock†	c Dhoni† b Thakur	29	17	0	4	170.58
Rohit Sharma*	c Dhoni† b Deepak	15	14	1	1	107.14
Suryakumar Yadav	b Tahir	15	17	1	0	88.23
Ishan Kishan	c Raina b Tahir	23	26	3	0	88.46
Krunal Pandya	c and b Thakur	7	7	0	0	100.00
Kieron Pollard	Not out	41	25	3	3	164.00
Hardik Pandya	lbw b Deepak	16	10	1	1	160.00
Rahul Chahar	c du Plessis b Deepak	0	2	–	–	0.00
Mitchell McClenaghan	run out (du Plessis/Bravo)	0	2	–	–	0.00
Jasprit Bumrah	Not out	0	0	–	–	0.00
Lasith Malinga	Did not bat					
Extras	(3 wides)	3				
Totals	(20 overs, 7.45 runs per over)	149/8				

Fall of wickets: 1-45 (de Kock, 4.5 overs), 2-45 (Rohit, 5.2 overs), 3-82 (Suryakumar, 11.2 overs), 4-89 (Krunal, 12.3 overs), 5-101 (Kishan, 14.4 overs), 6-140 (Hardik, 18.2 overs), 7-140 (Rahul, 18.4 overs), 8-141 (McClenaghan, 19.4 overs)

CSK bowling
Bowler	Overs	Maidens	Runs	Wickets	Economy
Deepak Chahar	4	1	26	3	6.50
Shardul Thakur	4	0	37	2	9.25
Harbhajan Singh	4	0	27	0	6.75
Dwayne Bravo	3	0	24	0	8.00
Imran Tahir	3	0	23	2	7.66
Ravindra Jadeja	2	0	12	0	6.00

CSK Batting Innings
Batsman	Dismissal	Runs	Balls	Four	Six	Strike rate
Faf du Plessis	st de Kock† b K Pandya	26	13	3	1	200.00
Shane Watson	run out (K Pandya/de Kock†)	80	59	8	4	135.59
Suresh Raina	lbw b R Chahar	8	14	0	0	57.14
Ambati Rayudu	c de Kock† b Bumrah	1	4	0	0	25.00
MS Dhoni*†	runout (Kishan)	2	8	0	0	25.00
Dwayne Bravo	c de Kock † b Bumrah	15	15	0	1	100.00
Ravindra Jadeja	Not out	5	5	0	0	100.00
Shardul Thakur	lbw b Malinga	2	2	0	0	100.00
Deepak Chahar	Did not bat					
Harbhajan Singh	Did not bat					
Imran Tahir	Did not bat					
Extras	(5 bye, 4 wides)	9				
Totals	(20 overs, 7.40 runs per over)	148/7				

Fall of wickets: 1-33 (du Plessis, 4 overs), 2-70 (Raina, 9.2 overs), 3-73 (Rayudu, 10.3 overs), 4-82 (Dhoni, 12.4 overs), 5-133 (Bravo, 18.2 overs), 6-146 (Watson, 19.4 overs), 7-148 (Thakur, 20 overs),

MI Bowling Innings
Bowler	Overs	Maidens	Runs	Wickets	Economy
Mitchell McClenaghan	4	0	24	0	6.00
Krunal Pandya	3	0	39	1	13.00
Lasith Malinga	4	0	49	1	12.25
Jasprit Bumrah	4	0	14	2	3.50
Rahul Chahar	4	0	14	1	3.50
Hardik Pandya	1	0	3	0	3.00

Key

- * – Captain
- † – Wicket-keeper
- c Fielder – the batsman was dismissed by a catch by the named fielder
- b Bowler – the bowler who gains credit for the dismissal
- lbw – the batsman was dismissed leg before wicket
- Total runs are in the format: score/wickets

== Post-match ==
Mumbai received ₹20 Crore rupees and a trophy for being the champions. Rohit said:

"Today we played some fine cricket. At the start of the tournament, we wanted to cut the tournament into two halves. Good to see we qualified in the top two in the league Stage and all credit to the whole squad of my team, not just the XI. Even the support staff too."

Chennai's Imran Tahir was given the Purple Cap for getting the highest number of wickets in the league. He took 26 wickets and broke the previous record for most wickets for spin bowler of 24 wickets held jointly by Harbhajan Singh (Mumbai Indians, 2013) and Sunil Narine (Kolkata Knight Riders, 2012).
