= Raghu Sharma =

Raghu Sharma may refer to:

- Raghu Sharma (cricketer)
- Raghu Sharma (politician)
