= Danish Malewar =

Indian cricketer (born 2003)

Personal information
- Full name: Danish Vishnu Malewar
- Born: October 8, 2003 (age 23); Nagpur, Vidharba, India
- Height: 170 cm (5 ft 7 in)
- Batting: Right-handed
- Bowling: Right-arm leg break
- Role: Batsman

Career statistics
Competition	FC	T20
Matches	15	2
Runs scored	1285	2
Batting average	49.42	1.00
100s/50s	3/10	0/0
Top score	203	2
Catches/stumpings	20/0	0/0
- Source: ESPNcricinfo, 6 May 2026

Danish Vishnu Malewar (born 8 October 2003) is an Indian cricketer who plays for Vidharba in domestic cricket and Mumbai Indians in the Indian Premier League.

He made his first-class debut on 11 October 2024 for Vidharba in the 2024-25 Ranji Trophy. He subsequently scored 783 runs at an average of 52 in the season and scored 153 off 285 balls in the final, which was won by Vidharba. In the 2025-26 Duleep Trophy, he scored 203 off 221 balls on debut for Central Zone against North East Zone, hitting 36 fours and a six during his innings.

Due to his domestic performances, Malewar was signed by Mumbai Indians for the 2026 IPL at his base price of INR 30 lakhs.
