= Satyanarayana Raju (cricketer) =

Indian cricketer (born 1999)

Personal information
- Born: 10 July 1999 (age 27); Kakinada, Andhra Pradesh, India
- Batting: Right-handed
- Bowling: Right arm medium-fast
- Role: Bowler

Domestic team information
- Years: Team
- 2024–present: Andhra
- 2025: Mumbai Indians (squad no. 1)

Career statistics
Competition	FC	LA	T20
Matches	8	7	9
Runs scored	14	42	12
Batting average	–	42.00	12.00
100s/50s	0/0	0/0	0/–
Top score	4	37*	11*
Balls bowled	1149	277	161
Wickets	17	9	8
Bowling average	40.35	27.22	30.12
5 wickets in innings	0	0	0
10 wickets in match	0	0	0
Best bowling	3/53	3/32	2/19
Catches/stumpings	–/–	3/–	3/–
- Source: ESPNcricinfo, 5 April 2025

Penumatsa Venkata Satyanarayana Raju (born 10 July 1999) is an Indian cricketer who plays for Andhra in domestic cricket and has appeared for Mumbai Indians in the Indian Premier League.

== Career ==
He made his List A debut on 21 December 2024, for Andhra in the 2024–25 Vijay Hazare Trophy. He made his first-class debut on 12 January 2024, for Andhra in the 2023–24 Ranji Trophy.

=== IPL ===
MI purchased Raju for ₹30 lakh in the 2025 IPL Super Auction. He made his IPL debut against Chennai Super Kings on 23 March 2025.
