= Robin Minz =

Indian cricketer

Personal information
- Born: 13 September 2002 (age 24); Gumla, Jharkhand, India
- Batting: Left-handed
- Bowling: Slow left arm orthodox
- Role: Wicket-keeper-batter

Domestic team information
- Years: Team
- 2024/25: Jharkhand
- 2025: Mumbai Indians

Career statistics
Competition	First-class	Twenty20
Matches	2	9
Runs scored	75	73
Batting average	18.75	12.16
100s/50s	0/0	0/0
Top score	39	36*
Catches/stumpings	5/1	6/0
- Source: ESPNcricinfo, 4 May 2025

Robin Minz (born 13 September 2002) is an Indian cricketer from Gumla, Jharkhand who plays for Jharkhand in domestic cricket and In the 2024 Indian Premier League auction, Robin Minz was bought by Gujarat Titans for ₹3.60 crore. However, he could not participate in the season after meeting with an accident prior to the tournament. Then further in 2025 Mumbai Indians picked him in Indian Premier League. He is a left-handed batsman and a wicket-keeper who was bought by the Mumbai Indians for ₹ 65 Lakhs in the 2025 IPL Auction. He made his IPL debut on 23 March 2025, playing for Mumbai Indians.
