= Krishnan Shrijith =

Indian cricketer (born 1996)

Personal information
- Full name: Krishnan Lakshmanan Shrijith
- Born: 12 August 1996 (age 30); Bangalore
- Batting: Left-handed
- Role: Wicket-keeper

Domestic team information
- Years: Team
- 2021–present: Karnataka cricket team
- FC debut: 13 November 2024 Karnataka v Uttar Pradesh
- LA debut: 11 December 2023 Karnataka v Vidarbha

Career statistics
Competition	FC	LA	T20
Matches	3	12	17
Runs scored	182	355	393
Batting average	36.40	39.44	32.75
100s/50s	1/0	1/1	0/2
Top score	110	150*	72*
Catches/stumpings	8/–	13/2	6/3
- Source: ESPNcricinfo, 6 March 2025

Krishnan Lakshmanan Shrijith (born 12 August 1996) is an Indian cricketer who plays for Karnataka cricket team. He is a left-handed batter and wicket-keeper.

== Career ==
He made his T20 Cricket debut for the Karnataka cricket team in early 2021 during the 2020-21 Syed Mushtaq Ali Trophy.

In 2024, he hit a 51-ball century in the Maharaja T20 Trophy. He made his debut in the Ranji Trophy in November 2024 for Karnaraka, scoring a century in Lucknow against Uttar Pradesh. In December 2024, he scored a 101-ball 150 as Karnataka chased down 383 against Mumbai in the Vijay Hazare Trophy for his first List-A century. In doing so, he became the tenth batsman to score a century on debut for the team. It was also the second-highest successful run chase in Vijay Hazare Trophy history.

In November 2024, he earned a maiden Indian Premier League contract when he was signed by Mumbai Indians at the IPL mega auction.

== Personal life ==
From Bengaluru he was encouraged to take up cricket by his father who was passionate about the game. His father died in 2024.
