= Shardul Thakur =

Indian cricketer (born 1991)

Personal information
- Full name: Shardul Narendra Thakur
- Born: 16 October 1991 (age 35); Palghar, Maharashtra, India
- Nickname: Lord, Beefy
- Height: 175 cm (5 ft 9 in)
- Batting: Right-handed
- Bowling: Right-arm medium
- Role: Bowler

International information
- National side: India (2017–2025)
- Test debut (cap 294): 12 October 2018 v West Indies
- Last Test: 23 July 2025 v England
- ODI debut (cap 218): 31 August 2017 v Sri Lanka
- Last ODI: 19 October 2023 v Bangladesh
- ODI shirt no.: 54
- T20I debut (cap 73): 21 February 2018 v South Africa
- Last T20I: 20 February 2022 v West Indies
- T20I shirt no.: 54

Domestic team information
- Years: Team
- 2012–present: Mumbai
- 2015: Kings XI Punjab
- 2017: Rising Pune Supergiants
- 2018–2021, 2024: Chennai Super Kings
- 2022: Delhi Capitals
- 2023: Kolkata Knight Riders
- 2025: Lucknow Super Giants
- 2026: Mumbai Indians

Career statistics
Competition	Test	ODI	T20I	FC
Matches	13	47	25	97
Runs scored	377	329	69	2,688
Batting average	18.85	17.31	23.00	20.83
100s/50s	0/4	0/1	0/0	2/17
Top score	67	50*	22*	119
Balls bowled	1,611	1,940	506	15,792
Wickets	33	65	33	302
Bowling average	31.03	30.98	23.39	28.25
5 wickets in innings	1	0	0	15
10 wickets in match	0	0	0	1
Best bowling	7/61	4/37	4/27	7/61
Catches/stumpings	6/–	9/–	7/–	29/–
Medal record
Men's cricket
Representing India
ICC World Test Championship
Runner-up	2021–2023
ICC Cricket World Cup
Runner-up	2023 India
ACC Asia Cup
Winner	2018 UAE
Winner	2023 Pakistan
- Source: ESPNcricinfo, 12 September 2025

Shardul Narendra Thakur (born 16 October 1991) is an Indian cricketer who plays for Mumbai in domestic cricket and Mumbai Indians in the Indian Premier League. He bats right-handed and bowls right arm medium pace. Thakur was part of the Indian squad which won the 2018 and 2023 Asia Cup.

== Domestic career ==
Shorter than a typical fast bowler and criticized for his conditioning early in his career, Thakur ultimately became a part of the Mumbai domestic team.

In November 2012, he made his first-class debut for Mumbai against Rajasthan at Jaipur in the 2012–13 Ranji Trophy. He did not have a good start to his career as he took four wickets at a bowling average of 82.0 from his first four games. In 2013–14 Ranji season, he took 27 wickets at 26.25 from six games, with one five-wicket haul. In the 2014-15 Ranji season, he took 48 wickets at 20.81 from ten games with five five-wicket hauls. He made his List A debut on 27 February 2014, for Mumbai in the 2013–14 Vijay Hazare Trophy.

In 2015-16 Ranji Trophy final, he took eight wickets against Saurashtra and led Mumbai to win its 41st Ranji Trophy title.

== International career ==
He was named in India's 16-man squad for India's Test tour of West Indies in 2016, but he did not play. In August 2017, he was named in India's limited-overs squad for the series against Sri Lanka. He made his One Day International (ODI) debut on 31 August 2017 against Sri Lanka.

He became the second Indian cricketer to wear the number 10 jersey after Sachin Tendulkar, which raised various controversial comments in social media. Later, he changed his jersey number to 54 due to controversy. On 29 November 2017, Board of Control for Cricket in India (BCCI) retired Tendulkar's No. 10 jersey.

He made his Twenty20 International (T20I) debut for India against South Africa on 21 February 2018.

In March 2018, he was selected to play in the 2018 Nidahas Trophy. In a match against Sri Lanka he took a career best 4-27 to bring the game back to India's favour, winning the Man Of the Match award. He finished with 6 wickets from 5 matches at an average of 29.33.

In May 2018, he was named in India's Test squad for the one-off Test against Afghanistan in June 2018, but did not play.

In October 2018, he made his Test debut against the West Indies, making him the 294th player to represent Team India in Tests. His debut ended after bowling just 10 deliveries due to suffering from a groin strain in his right leg. In the historic Gabba Test vs Australia, Shardul made 67 in the first innings and took a total of 7 wickets in that match. Thakur was included in the India squad for the 2021 England tour. He was employed as an extra seam bowler in the First Test at Nottingham. An injury ruled him out of the next two Tests before he returned for the Fourth Test at the Oval. He made 57 in 36 balls in India's first innings, reaching his half-century in 31 balls, the fastest in Tests played in England. In the second innings, he scored 60 in 72 balls to help India post 466. He took three crucial wickets with the ball, dismissing Ollie Pope for 81 in the first innings, and Rory Burns and Joe Root in the second, and was instrumental in securing his team's victory. Thakur finished the series with 117 runs at 39 with the bat, while claiming seven wickets at 22 with the ball. The Guardian wrote, "The journeyman bowler who bats transformed himself into Kapil Dev, repeatedly delivering a considered counter-attack with bat and ball that permitted not a shred of self-doubt. Though his bowling might be specifically suited to English conditions, he made the absolute most of his talents."

In September 2021, Thakur was named as one of three reserve players in India's squad for the T20 World Cup to be held in October. On 13 October, Thakur replaced Axar Patel in India's main squad for the tournament. He was included in the playing eleven for two games of the tournament.

In the second Test match against South Africa at the Wanderers Stadium in January 2022, Shardul Thakur registered his first five-wicket haul in Test matches, and also registered the best bowling figures for an Indian bowler against South Africa. His figures were 7/61, which helped India bowl out South Africa for 229. He also provided a quickfire cameo of 28 runs to help increase India's lead in the second innings, however India lost the match. Thakur's match figures were 8/108.

In January 2023, Thakur took six wickets in the ODI series against New Zealand. Also he became player of the match in the third ODI by scoring 25 runs with bat and taking three wickets.

== IPL career ==
Thakur was signed by Kings XI Punjab at the 2014 IPL player auction ahead of the 2015 season of Indian Premier League and made his debut against Delhi Daredevils, taking one wicket in his four overs. In March 2017, he was acquired by Rising Pune Supergiants for the tenth season of the IPL and in January 2018, was bought by Chennai Super Kings ahead of the next season.

In 2019 Chennai reached the IPL final; Thakur took two wickets but was out off the final ball of the match with two runs required for victory. In 2021, he was the leading wicket-taker for Chennai with 21 wickets during the season.

At the 2022 IPL auction, Thakur was signed for ₹10.75 crore (US$1.43 million). After playing in 14 matches during the 2022 season, in November 2022 he was traded to the Kolkata Knight Riders in exchange for Aman Khan.

He went unclaimed in the 2025 IPL mega auction, and agreed to join Essex for the 2025 County Championship. However, on 23 March 2025, Thakur was announced as the replacement for the injured Mohsin Khan by the Lucknow Super Giants for IPL 2025. He signed a reserve contract of ₹2 crore.

Thakur was traded from Lucknow to the Mumbai Indians ahead of the 2026 season.

== Personal life ==
In November 2021, Thakur got engaged to Mittali Parulkar. The pair married on February 27, 2023.
