= Deepak Chahar =

Indian cricketer (born 1992)

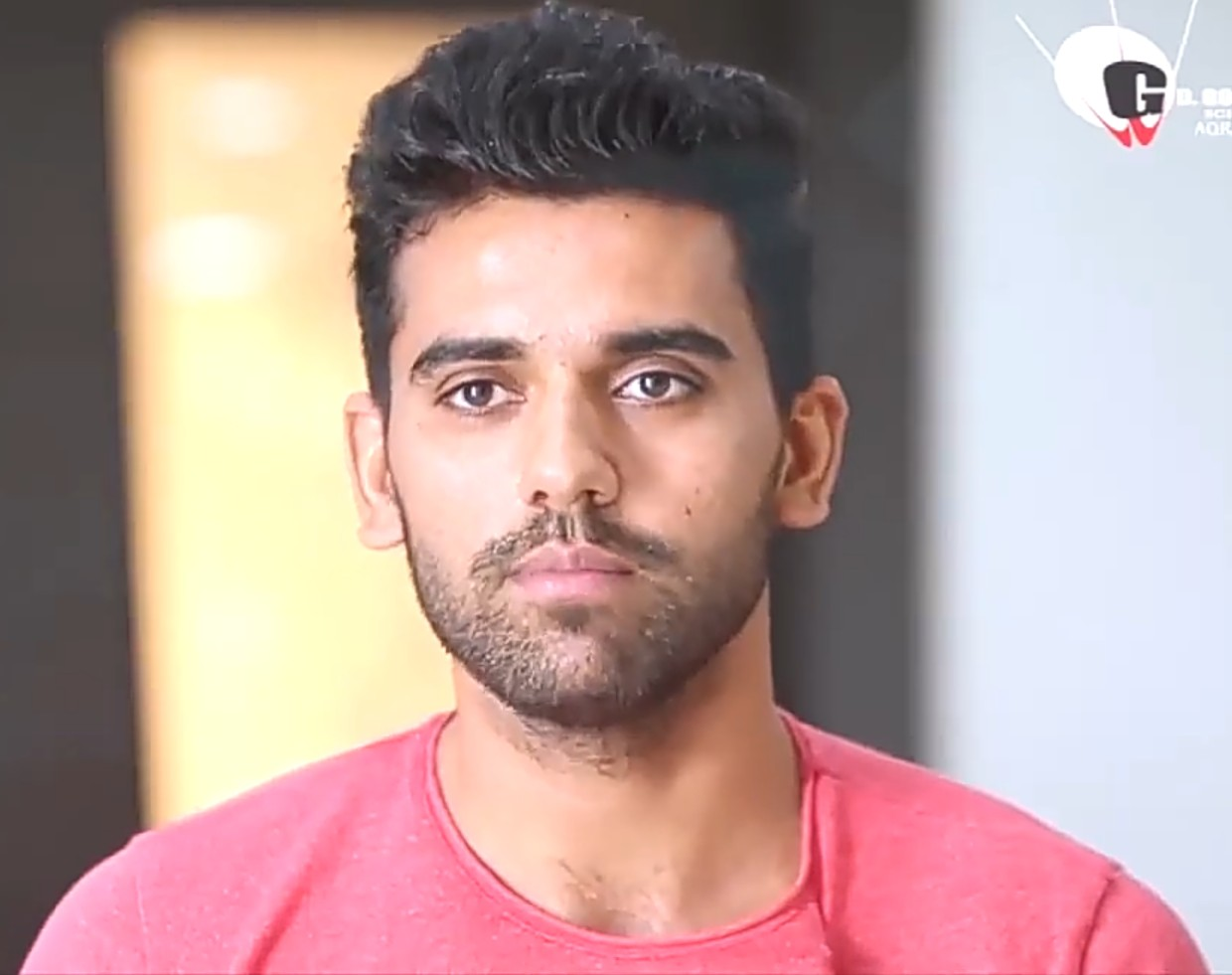
- Chahar in 2019

Personal information
- Full name: Deepak Lokendrasingh Chahar
- Born: 7 August 1992 (age 34); Agra, Uttar Pradesh, India
- Batting: Right-handed
- Bowling: Right arm medium
- Role: Bowler
- Relatives: Jaya Bhardwaj (spouse); Rahul Chahar (cousin); Malti Chahar (sister); Sidharth Bhardwaj (brother in law)

International information
- National side: India (2018–2023)
- ODI debut (cap 223): 25 September 2018 v Afghanistan
- Last ODI: 7 December 2022 v Bangladesh
- ODI shirt no.: 90
- T20I debut (cap 76): 8 July 2018 v England
- Last T20I: 1 December 2023 v Australia
- T20I shirt no.: 90

Domestic team information
- Years: Team
- 2009/10–present: Rajasthan (squad no. 9/90)
- 2016–2017: Rising Pune Supergiants (squad no. 9/45)
- 2018–2024: Chennai Super Kings (squad no. 90)
- 2025–2026: Mumbai Indians (squad no. 56)

Career statistics
Competition	ODI	T20I
Matches	13	25
Runs scored	203	53
Batting average	33.83	26.50
100s/50s	0/2	0/0
Top score	69*	31
Balls bowled	510	540
Wickets	16	31
Bowling average	30.56	24.09
5 wickets in innings	0	1
10 wickets in match	0	0
Best bowling	3/27	6/7
Catches/stumpings	1/–	2/–
Medal record
Men's Cricket
Representing India
ACC Asia Cup
Winner	2018 United Arab Emirates
- Source: ESPNcricinfo, 7 December 2022

Deepak Chahar (born 7 August 1992) is an Indian international cricketer. He is a right-arm medium pace swing bowler, who plays for Rajasthan in domestic cricket and Mumbai Indians in the Indian Premier League. He was a part of the Indian squad which won the 2018 Asia Cup.

In 2019, he became the first Indian male cricketer to take a hat-trick in a Twenty20 International (T20I) match. In January 2020, Chahar was awarded the T20I Performance of the Year award by the International Cricket Council (ICC), after taking six wickets for seven runs against Bangladesh.

== Early and personal life ==
Chahar was born in 1992 in Agra, Uttar Pradesh. His younger cousin is Rahul Chahar. His Sister Malti Chahar is Bollywood Actress, Writer and Director.

He proposed to his Delhi-based girlfriend, Jaya Bhardwaj, during his team's last league-stage match of the 2021 Indian Premier League.

== Domestic career ==
Chahar took eight wickets for 10 runs (8/10) against Hyderabad on his first-class cricket debut in the 2010–11 Ranji Trophy; Hyderabad were bowled out for 21 runs, the lowest total in Ranji Trophy history. Chahar's swing bowling soon earned him a youth contract with Rajasthan Royals, an Indian Premier League Twenty20 cricket franchise.

In 2016, he was signed up by the Rising Pune Supergiants. In October 2016, he worked with international coaches Ian Pont and Catherine Dalton in Jaipur as part of Rajasthan's development camp.

In January 2018, he was bought by Chennai Super Kings in the 2018 IPL auction. In October 2018, he was named in the India B squad for the 2018–19 Deodhar Trophy. In February 2022, he was bought by Chennai Super Kings in the auction for the 2022 Indian Premier League tournament. However, he was later ruled out of the tournament due to a back injury.

On 25 November 2024, during the IPL mega auction in Jeddah, he was signed up by the Mumbai Indians.

== International career ==
In May 2018, Chahar was named in India's Twenty20 International (T20I) squad for the team's tour of England. He made his T20I debut on 8 July 2018, taking one wicket. He made his One Day International debut against Afghanistan in September 2018 during the 2018 Asia Cup.

Chahar was selected in the Indian Twenty20 squad against West Indies in 2019, playing in the final match of the series and winning the player of the match award after taking three wickets for four runs. He was subsequently selected for the three-match T20I series against Bangladesh. In the final match of the series he set new best bowling figures in a men's T20I, with six wickets for seven runs from 3.2 overs. (Note: These figures have since been bettered.) During the series, he also took the first hat-trick by a bowler for India in T20I and his first five-wicket haul in T20Is.

In July 2021, Chahar scored his maiden ODI half-century, and in September was named as one of three reserve players in India's squad for the 2021 ICC Men's T20 World Cup. In January 2022, he scored his second half century in ODIs against South Africa.

== See also ==
- Cricket in India
- Hardik Pandya
- Shubman Gill
- Abhishek Sharma
