= Raghu Sharma (cricketer) =

Indian cricketer (born 1993)

Personal information
- Full name: Raghu Shivam Sharma
- Born: 11 March 1993 (age 33); Jalandhar, Punjab, India
- Batting: Right-handed
- Bowling: Legbreak googly
- Role: Bowler
- Source: Cricinfo, 14 October 2017

Raghu Sharma (born 11 March 1993) is an Indian cricketer. He made his first-class debut for Punjab in the 2017–18 Ranji Trophy on 14 October 2017. He made his Twenty20 debut on 11 January 2021, for Puducherry in the 2020–21 Syed Mushtaq Ali Trophy.

In 2025, Mumbai Indians signed him for the Indian Premier League as a mid-season replacement for the injured Vignesh Puthur. He made his IPL debut against Chennai Super Kings in 2026.

== Family and background ==
His father retired as Deputy Director General from Doordarshan. His mother retired as assistant director from All India Radio. His brother is MDS in Pedodontics and Preventive Dentistry and works in Canada. His sister-in-law is a dentist.

Raghu is follower of Gaudiya Math and took deeksha from Shyam Das Baba.
