= Ashwani Kumar (cricketer) =

Indian cricketer (born 2001)

Personal information
- Born: 29 August 2001 (age 25); Jhanjeri, Mohali, India
- Batting: Left-handed
- Bowling: Left arm medium-fast
- Role: Bowler

Domestic team information
- Years: Team
- 2019/20–: Punjab
- 2025–present: Mumbai Indians

Career statistics
Competition	FC	LA	T20
Matches	2	4	21
Runs scored	22	6	–
Batting average	–	–	–
100s/50s	0/0	0/0	–/–
Top score	22*	4*	–
Balls bowled	254	162	393
Wickets	3	3	25
Bowling average	57.00	52.66	25.88
5 wickets in innings	0	0	0
10 wickets in match	0	0	0
Best bowling	1/26	3/37	4/24
Catches/stumpings	1/–	2/–	3/–
- Source: ESPNcricinfo, 21 April 2025

Ashwani Kumar (born 29 August 2001) is an Indian cricketer who plays for Punjab in domestic cricket and Mumbai Indians in the Indian Premier League. He made his first-class debut on 9 December 2019, for Punjab in the 2019–20 Ranji Trophy. He made his List A debut on 8 December 2021, for Punjab in the 2021–22 Vijay Hazare Trophy.

Ashwani was signed for Mumbai Indians in the IPL 2025 mega auctions for 30 lakhs.

On 30 March 2025, Kumar made his IPL debut for the Mumbai Indians in a match against Kolkata Knight Riders. Bowling his very first ball in the IPL, he got the wicket of Kolkata Knight Riders captain Ajinkya Rahane, having him caught at backward point. He also added the prized wickets of Rinku Singh, Manish Pandey, and Andre Russell. He ended with figures of 4/24 in 3 overs, helping bowl KKR out for 116, and subsequently earning Player of the Match for this match winning performance.
