= Vignesh Puthur =

Indian cricketer (born 2001)

Personal information
- Born: 2 March 2001 (age 25); Perinthalmanna, Kerala, India
- Bowling: Left-arm wrist spin
- Role: Bowler

Domestic team information
- Years: Team
- 2025–present: Kerala
- 2025: Mumbai Indians
- 2026: Rajasthan Royals
- Source: ESPNcricinfo, 23 March 2025

Vignesh Puthur (born 2 March 2001) is an Indian cricketer who plays for Kerala in domestic cricket and Rajasthan Royals in the Indian Premier League.

== Early life ==
Vignesh Puthur was born on 2 March 2001, in Perinthalmanna in Kerala. His father Sunil Kumar is an autorickshaw driver and his mother K.P. Bindhu is a homemaker. He completed his secondary education at Government Model Higher Secondary School, Perinthalmanna and later graduated from St. Thomas’ College (Autonomous), Thrissur. Vignesh is currently pursuing an MA Literature at PTM Government College, Perinthalmanna.

== Career ==
Vignesh Puthur began his initial coaching under cricket coach Vijayan in Perinthalmanna and playing for Kerala in the Under-14, Under-19, Under-23 categories and later he was a part of the inaugural season of the Kerala Cricket League (KCL), representing the Alleppey Ripples.

=== IPL ===
He acted as a net bowler for the MI Cape Town prior to their purchase of him for ₹30 lakh in the 2025 IPL Mega auction by Mumbai Indians. He made his IPL debut against Chennai Super Kings on 23 March 2025 and took the wickets of Ruturaj Gaikwad, Shivam Dube and Deepak Hooda.

As of 15 November 2025, Vignesh was released by the Mumbai Indians ahead of the 2026 season.

In the 2026 Indian Premier League auction, he was bought by Rajasthan Royals for 30 lakhs ahead of the 2026 Indian Premier League.
