= Mumbai Indians =

Mumbai-based cricket franchise in the Indian Premier League

- League: Indian Premier League

Personnel
- Captain: Suryakumar Yadav
- Coach: (Trinidad and Tobago) Kieron Pollard
- Owner: Reliance Industries

Team information
- City: Mumbai, Maharashtra, India
- Colours
- Established: January 24, 2008
- Home ground: Wankhede Stadium
- Capacity: 33108

History
- Indian Premier League wins: 5 (2013, 2015, 2017, 2019, 2020)
- Champions League T20 wins: 2 (2011, 2013)
- Official website: mumbaiindians.com
T20I kit

The Mumbai Indians are a professional Twenty20 cricket team based in Mumbai, Maharashtra, that competes in the Indian Premier League (IPL). The team is popularly referred to as MI or MI Paltan. The MI were founded in 2008 and are owned by India's largest conglomerate, Reliance Industries, through its wholly-owned subsidiary, Indiawin Sports. Since its establishment, the team has primarily played its home matches at the 33,108-capacity Wankhede Stadium. It is one of the most successful teams in the IPL.

In 2017, the Mumbai Indians became the first franchise to cross the $100 million mark in brand value. The brand value of the Mumbai Indians in 2019 was estimated around ₹809 crore ($115 million), the highest among all the IPL franchises for the fourth consecutive year.

The Mumbai Indians won the 2011 Champions League Twenty20 after beating the Royal Challengers Bangalore by 31 runs in the final. The team won the double by winning its first IPL title, in 2013, by defeating the Chennai Super Kings by 23 runs in the final, and then defeated the Rajasthan Royals by 33 runs to win its second Champions League Twenty20 title both in the captaincy of Rohit Sharma later that year. They won their second IPL title on 24 May 2015 by defeating the Chennai Super Kings by 41 runs in the final the final and became the third team to win more than one IPL title. On 21 May 2017, they won their third IPL title by defeating the Rising Pune Supergiant by one run in the final, thus becoming the first team to win three IPL titles. While playing the tournament, they won their 100th T20, becoming the first team to do so. In 2019, they repeated the same feat as they won a record breaking fourth IPL title, by beating CSK by just 1 run on 12 May 2019 in the IPL Final. They became the first team to win the IPL title for the fifth time, by beating the Delhi Capitals by 5 wickets on 10 November 2020 in the IPL Final.

The Mumbai Indians captain is currently vacant after 2026 captain Hardik Pandya was traded to the Punjab Kings. Kieron Pollard was appointed as head coach of the team before the 2027 season. Robin Uthappa is the batting coach and Mitchell McClenaghan is their bowling coach. Rohit Sharma is the leading run scorer of the team while Jasprit Bumrah is the leading wicket taker of the team.

== History ==
=== Foundation ===
The Board of Control for Cricket in India (BCCI) announced in September 2007, the establishment of the Indian Premier League, a Twenty20 competition to be started in 2008. On January 24, 2008, the BCCI unveiled the owners of eight city-based franchises. The Mumbai franchise was sold to the Reliance Industries Ltd (RIL) for $111.9 million, making it the most expensive team to be sold in the league. RIL, owned by Mukesh Ambani, acquired the rights to the franchise for a period of 10 years.

=== 2008–2009: Struggle in the initial seasons ===
The Indian Premier League named four players as icon players for their respective city franchises, making them unavailable for the player auction; Sachin Tendulkar was designated as Mumbai's icon player. At the inaugural player auctions in February 2008, the Mumbai franchise purchased several international stars, including Sanath Jayasuriya, Harbhajan Singh, Shaun Pollock, Lasith Malinga, and Robin Uthappa. Tendulkar was appointed captain with Lalchand Rajput as head coach.

However, a hamstring injury sidelined Tendulkar at the start of the 2008 season, leading Harbhajan Singh to take over the captaincy. The team lost its first four matches, including a five-wicket defeat to Royal Challengers Bangalore in their opener on 20 April 2008. Following the "Slapgate" incident where Harbhajan was suspended for striking Sreesanth, Shaun Pollock assumed leadership duties. Under Pollock, Mumbai won six consecutive matches but ultimately finished fifth in the points table, missing the semi-finals by a single point after three narrow losses in their final four games.

The 2009 season was relocated to South Africa due to security concerns surrounding the 2009 Indian general election. Before the season, Mumbai traded Robin Uthappa for Zaheer Khan and Ashish Nehra for Shikhar Dhawan. Despite the return of Lasith Malinga and the addition of JP Duminy, the team struggled with consistency. Reliance on a few key performers resulted in only five wins from 14 matches, leaving Mumbai in seventh place.

=== 2010–2012: Rise as a strong team ===
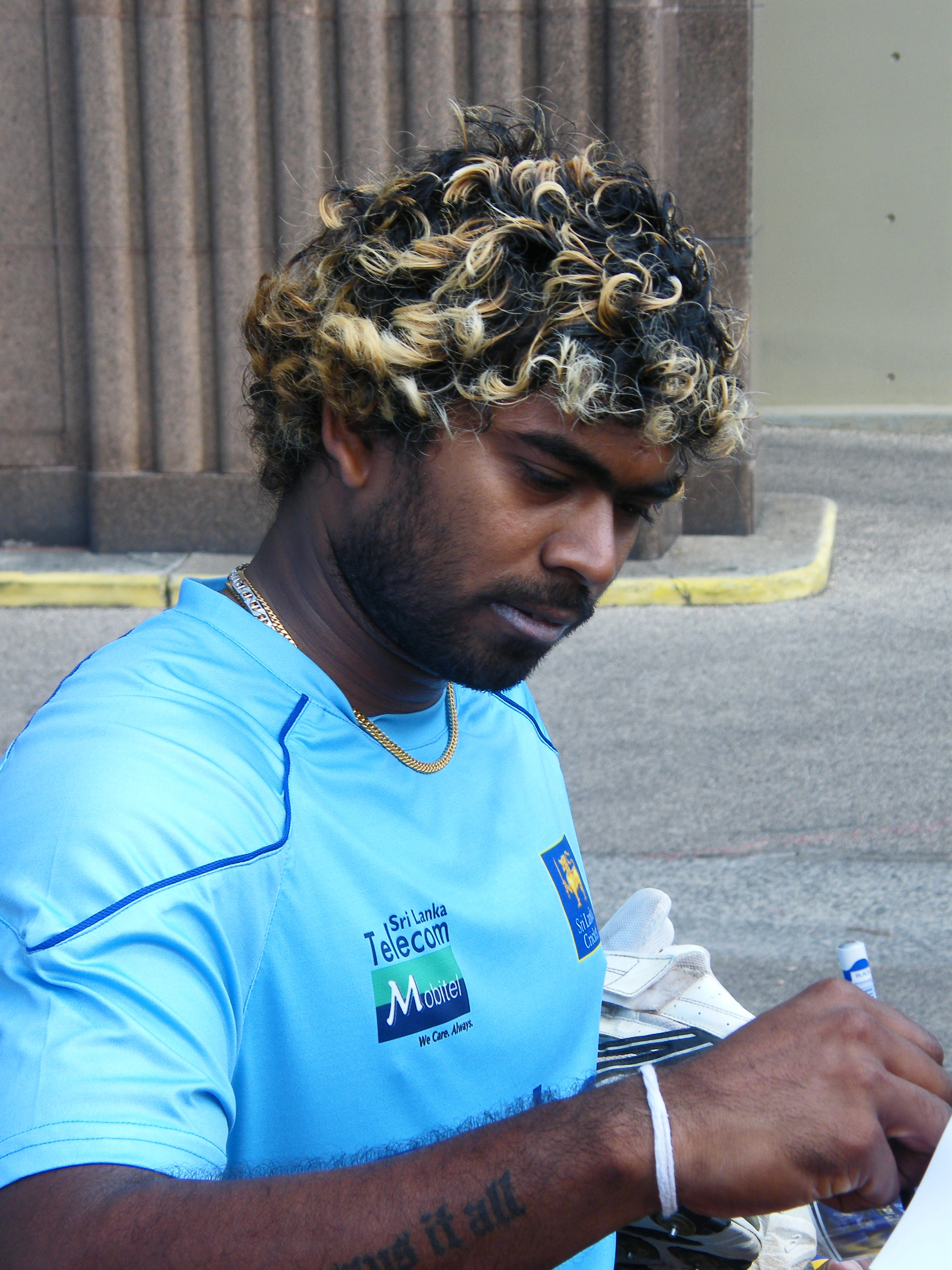
Lasith Malinga became the first player to reach 150 IPL wickets, a milestone achieved entirely with the Mumbai Indians.

At the 2010 players auction, Mumbai Indians signed Trinidadian all-rounder Kieron Pollard for $750,000 following a secret tie-breaker process. Former India cricketer Robin Singh was appointed head coach, while Shaun Pollock moved into a bowling coach role. Due to renovations at the Wankhede Stadium for the 2011 ICC Cricket World Cup, the team played its home matches at the Brabourne Stadium. Mumbai dominated the league stage, finishing top of the table with 20 points. Sachin Tendulkar won the Orange Cap for the season's highest run-scorer (618 runs). However, the team lost the final to Chennai Super Kings by 22 runs, with management facing criticism for tactical decisions regarding the batting order.

In 2011, Mumbai Indians retained Tendulkar, Harbhajan, Pollard, and Malinga. In the subsequent auction, they made a significant acquisition by signing Rohit Sharma for $2 million. The team finished third in the league stage and won the Eliminator against Kolkata Knight Riders before losing to Royal Challengers Bangalore in the second qualifier. Malinga finished the season as the leading wicket-taker with 28 dismissals.

Later that year, despite missing several key Indian players due to injury, Mumbai Indians won their first major trophy by defeating Royal Challengers Bangalore in the 2011 Champions League Twenty20 final. Due to the injury crisis, the CLT20 governing council allowed Mumbai to field an unprecedented five overseas players. Harbhajan Singh captained the team to a 31-run victory in the final, where he was named Player of the Match.

Before the start of the 2012 season, Mumbai Indians acquired Dinesh Karthik from Kings XI Punjab and Pragyan Ojha from Deccan Chargers. At the auction, the franchise added R. P. Singh, Thisara Perera, and Mitchell Johnson. Prior to the season opener, Sachin Tendulkar stepped down as captain, with Harbhajan Singh appointed as his successor. The team struggled with opening combinations due to Tendulkar's injuries and Mitchell Johnson being ruled out for the season, leading to the recruitment of Dwayne Smith as a replacement. Mumbai finished third in the league stage but were eliminated by Chennai Super Kings in the Eliminator, losing by 38 runs.

=== 2013: The IPL and CLT20 Double ===
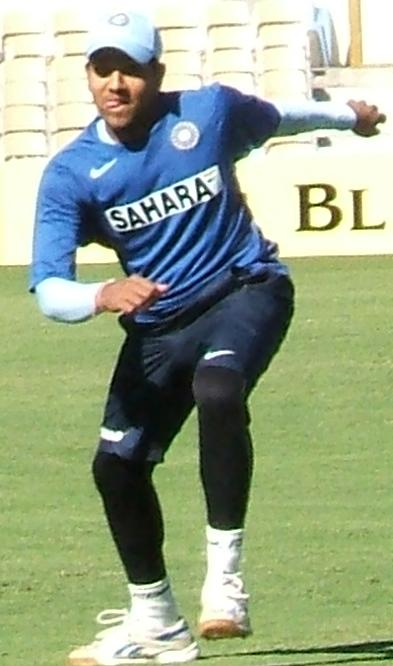
Rohit Sharma was appointed captain in 2013, leading the team to its first IPL title that same year.

The 2013 IPL marked a turning point for the franchise with Anil Kumble joining as chief mentor. Ricky Ponting was initially appointed captain, but after a prolonged slump in batting form, he voluntarily stepped down from the team. Rohit Sharma was named captain mid-season, a move that significantly improved the team's performance. Under Sharma's leadership, Mumbai Indians defeated Chennai Super Kings by 23 runs in the final at Eden Gardens to secure their maiden IPL title. Kieron Pollard was named Player of the Match for his unbeaten 60.

Mumbai Indians continued their success in the 2013 Champions League Twenty20. Despite a slow start, they qualified for the knockout stage following a crucial win over the Perth Scorchers. In the final against Rajasthan Royals, Mumbai posted 202/6 and won by 33 runs, becoming the first team to win the IPL and CLT20 double in the same year. This match also marked the final competitive T20 appearance for both Sachin Tendulkar and Rahul Dravid.

=== 2014–2020: Period of dominance ===
The 2014 season began poorly for the defending champions, as they lost all five matches during the tournament's opening leg in the United Arab Emirates. However, upon returning to India, the team staged a remarkable recovery. In their final league match against Rajasthan Royals, Mumbai achieved a highly improbable qualification for the playoffs by chasing a target of 190 in just 14.4 overs. The winning runs were scored via a six by Aditya Tare off the final ball of the required window, leading to a dramatic improvement in their net run rate. Their campaign eventually ended with a loss to Chennai Super Kings in the Eliminator.

In 2015, Mumbai Indians mirrored their previous year's start by losing four consecutive early matches. Despite losing Aaron Finch and Corey Anderson to injury, the team found success with the opening pair of Lendl Simmons and Parthiv Patel, supported by the arrival of pace bowler Mitchell McClenaghan. Mumbai won nine of their final ten games, culminating in a 41-run victory over Chennai Super Kings in the final to secure their second IPL title.

The 2017 season saw Mumbai finish at the top of the points table for the second time. In a low-scoring final against Rising Pune Supergiant, Mumbai defended a total of 129, winning by a single run on the final ball of the match. This victory made them the first team to win three IPL titles. The team's dominance continued as they secured back-to-back titles in 2019 and 2020, defeating Chennai Super Kings and Delhi Capitals respectively. The 2020 victory, achieved in the UAE during the COVID-19 pandemic, cemented their reputation as the league's most successful franchise with five championships.

In the 2018 season, Mumbai Indians finished fifth, narrowly missing the playoffs after recording six wins and eight losses.

The 2019 season saw Mumbai Indians clinch a record-breaking fourth title by defeating Chennai Super Kings in the final by just one run. The match concluded with a dramatic final delivery where Lasith Malinga trapped Shardul Thakur lbw, with Chennai requiring two runs to win. During the league stage, several individual records were set, including Alzarri Joseph recording the best bowling figures in IPL history (6/12) on his debut against Sunrisers Hyderabad. Additionally, Hardik Pandya recorded the season's fastest fifty (off 17 balls) during a 91-run innings against Kolkata Knight Riders.

In the 2020 season, which was relocated to the United Arab Emirates due to the COVID-19 pandemic in India, Mumbai Indians achieved their most dominant campaign to date. After finishing top of the league table, they defeated Delhi Capitals by five wickets in the final to secure their fifth championship and become only the second team to successfully defend an IPL title. The victory solidified their status as the most successful franchise in the league's history at that time.

=== 2021–present: Period of transition and struggles ===
Prior to the 2021 season, Mumbai Indians released several squad members but re-acquired Nathan Coulter-Nile and signed experienced leg-spinner Piyush Chawla. The team struggled on the slow, spinning tracks in Chennai during the tournament's first half, eventually finishing fifth in the points table and missing the playoffs for the first time in three years.

The 2022 Mega Auction saw a significant roster overhaul. While the team retained the core of Sharma, Bumrah, Pollard, and Yadav, they made Ishan Kishan the second-most expensive Indian player in auction history at ₹15.25 crore. The season was the franchise's statistically worst, as they lost their first eight consecutive matches and finished at the bottom of the table.Interestingly they also terminated the services of Robin Singh who was largely instrumental in all their trophy’s and replaced him with the resignation of Kieron Pollard as a player now filling the former batting coaches shoes

In 2023, despite the absence of Jasprit Bumrah due to a back injury, Mumbai reached the playoffs. The season was highlighted by the emergence of uncapped players like Tilak Varma and Akash Madhwal, the latter taking 5/5 in the Eliminator against Lucknow Super Giants. However, they were eliminated by Gujarat Titans in Qualifier 2.

The 2024 season was marked by significant internal restructuring as the franchise traded for Hardik Pandya and appointed him captain, replacing long-time skipper Rohit Sharma. The decision faced substantial criticism from fans and the season ended with Mumbai finishing last (10th) for the second time in three years.

In 2025, under the returning head coach Mahela Jayawardene, the team showed improved form, finishing 4th in the league stage. Suryakumar Yadav enjoyed a record-breaking season, scoring 717 runs and winning the Player of the Tournament award, though the team was eventually eliminated by Punjab Kings in Qualifier 2.

For the 2026 season, the franchise maintained its core, retaining Pandya, Sharma, Bumrah, and Yadav. Hardik Pandya continued as captain, supported by a bowling attack led by Jasprit Bumrah and the return of Trent Boult.

In the 2026 season, Mumbai Indians entered the tournament with Hardik Pandya continuing as captain. The team retained key players including Rohit Sharma, Jasprit Bumrah, and Suryakumar Yadav. The franchise strengthened its squad with the return of Trent Boult and the acquisition of Shardul Thakur during the player auction. The team aimed to rebuild after inconsistent performances in previous seasons while maintaining its core leadership group. The team clenched a dominating 6 wicket victory against the Kolkata Knight Riders, chasing down 221 runs in 19.1 overs. The team had won their opening match after 14 whole years, breaking the opening game jinx.

== Home ground ==
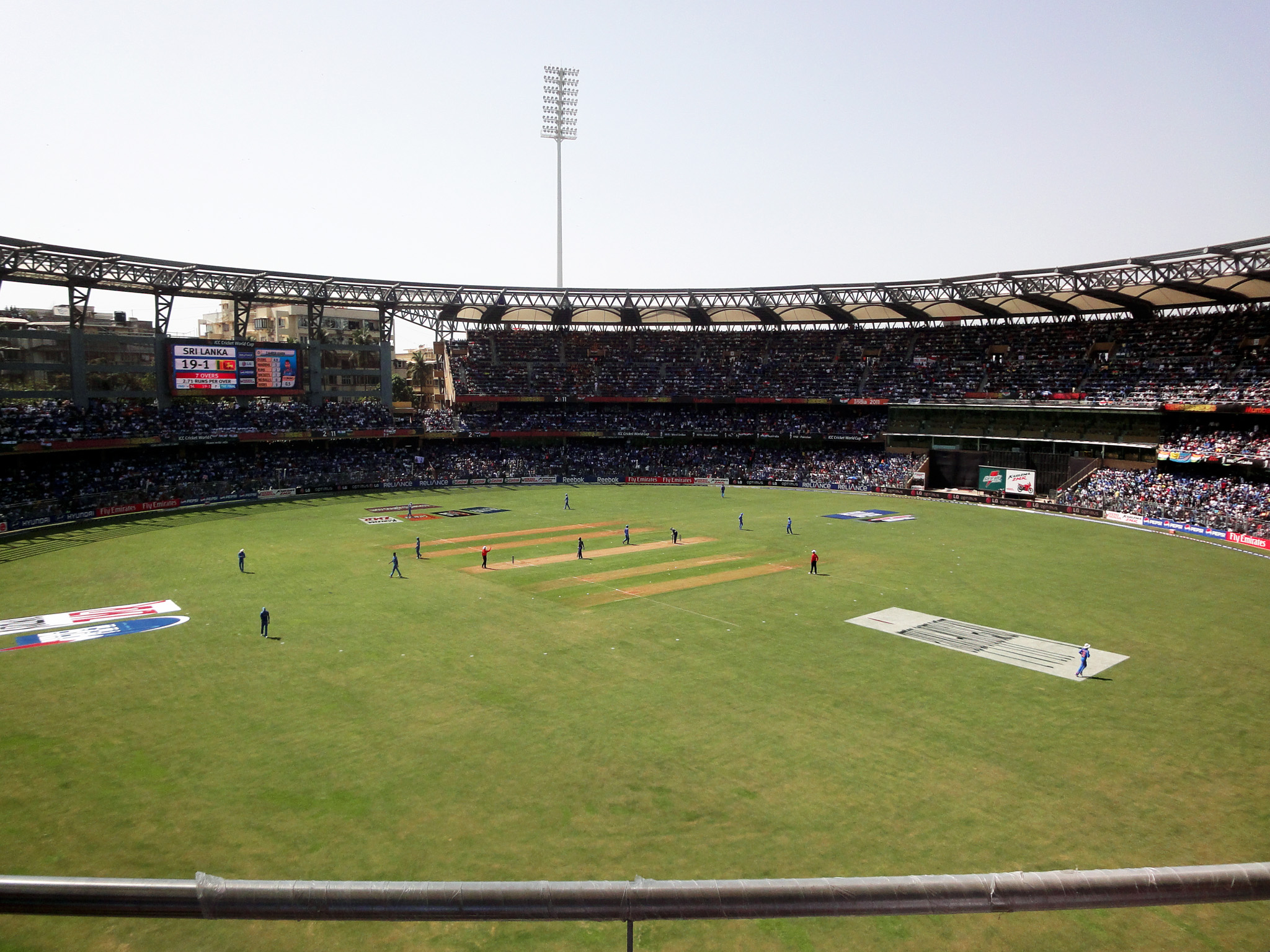
Wankhede Stadium, the primary home ground of Mumbai Indians since 2011.

The Mumbai Indians played their home matches at the DY Patil Stadium in Navi Mumbai during the inaugural 2008 and 2009 seasons. In 2010, the franchise shifted its home base to the Brabourne Stadium as the Wankhede Stadium was undergoing major renovations to host the 2011 ICC Cricket World Cup final. The team enjoyed significant success at the Brabourne, winning six of their seven home games that season.

Since 2011, the team has played its primary home games at the Wankhede Stadium in South Mumbai. Named after former BCCI President S. K. Wankhede, the stadium is owned by the Mumbai Cricket Association (MCA) and has a seating capacity of approximately 33,108. The venue is known for its partisan crowd and the "North Stand" atmosphere, which is a core part of the Mumbai Indians' brand identity.

Due to the COVID-19 pandemic and logistics, the team has occasionally played home games at neutral venues, including the Sheikh Zayed Cricket Stadium in Abu Dhabi (2020) and the MCA Cricket Stadium in Pune (2022). The franchise's global affiliates also maintain dedicated home grounds, such as Newlands Cricket Ground for MI Cape Town and St George's Park for MI Eastern Cape.

== Team identity ==
=== Team name, motto and logo design ===
The team motto is "Duniya Hila Denge Hum...", which translates to We will shake the world However recently team is also prioritizing "One Family" due to franchise expansion in many Leagues like SA20, ILT20, MLC and recently in The Hundred. The first anthem of Mumbai Indians was based on this motto, featuring a promotional campaign led by Bollywood actor Hrithik Roshan.

The team logo features a stylized Sudarshana Chakra. The franchise was originally intended to be named the "Mumbai Razors" before Sachin Tendulkar suggested "Mumbai Indians" to create a broader connection with the fans.

=== Jersey colours and kit ===
The team's primary colours are blue and gold. Since 2010, the jersey has featured gold stripes as a signature design element. Adidas served as the team's kit manufacturer from 2008 to 2014. In 2024, the team partnered with Skechers as the official kit manufacturer for both its men's and women's teams.

Starting from the 2025 season, Lauritz Knudsen (formerly L&T Switchgear) became the team's Principal Partner, with its logo featured prominently on the front of the official jersey. For the 2026 season, Malaysia Airlines joined as an Associate Partner and the Official Global Airline Partner, with its branding appearing on the front right chest of the jersey. Other major sponsors for the 2026 season include DHL (Back of Jersey) and Skechers (Official Kit Partner).

=== Kit manufacturers and sponsors ===
American multinational corporation – MasterCard was the official founding sponsor of the Mumbai Indians, while Adidas was their official apparel sponsor until 2014. Since then, the UAE's national carrier Etihad Airways signed a three-year contract and took over as one of the principle sponsors of Mumbai Indians. In 2015, Performax, the in-house brand of Reliance Trends, took over as the apparel sponsors. Associate sponsors and official partners include Bridgestone, Dheeraj and East Coast LLC, Kingfisher, Wrigley's Orbit, Wrigley's Boomer, Royal Stag, Air India, MSN and Red FM 93.5.

Hero MotoCorp was also one of the main sponsors of Mumbai Indians for 2011 and 2012 seasons. The principal sponsors of Mumbai Indians are Videocon d2h since 2013. In 2015, companies such as USHA, Jack & Jones, HTC, Tiny Owl, Paytm, Ola Cabs, DNA and Fever 104 FM came on board. From 2016, DHFL and Samsung joined as the new associate sponsors. Along with them, Pepsi, yatra.com, Radio City, LYF smartphones and Guvera came in as the new official sponsors. The global fashion brand Diesel's first ever association with cricket will produce a limited edition collection which will be available globally across popular cricket playing nations.

| Period | Kit supplier | Shirt sponsor (front) | Shirt sponsor (back) |
|---|---|---|---|
| 2008–2009 | Adidas | | MasterCard |
| 2009–2010 | Adidas | Idea | MasterCard |
| 2010–2011 | Adidas | Videocon | MasterCard |
| 2011–2012 | Adidas | Hero Honda | MasterCard |
| 2012–2013 | Adidas | Hero | MasterCard |
| 2013–2014 | Adidas | Videocon d2h | Bajaj Allianz |
| 2014–2015 | Adidas | Videocon d2h | Jet Airways |
| 2015–2018 | Performax | Videocon d2h | Jet Airways |
| 2018–2019 | Performax | Samsung | Ibibo |
| 2019–2021 | Performax | Samsung | Colors TV |
| 2021–2022 | Performax | Samsung | DHL |
| 2022–2024 | Performax | Slice | DHL |
| 2024–2025 | Skechers | Slice | DHL |
| 2025–2027 | Skechers | Lauritz Knudsen | DHL |
| 2027–present | Nike | | |

== Players ==
During the inaugural 2008 player auction, Mumbai Indians acquired seven players, including Harbhajan Singh, Robin Uthappa, and Lasith Malinga. In 2010, the team signed Kieron Pollard for $750,000 via a silent tie-breaker.

Following the 2025 season, which saw Suryakumar Yadav win the MVP award with a record 717 runs, the franchise entered the 2026 season with a stabilized leadership structure. Hardik Pandya was the captain, and led a retained core of Jasprit Bumrah, Rohit Sharma, and Suryakumar Yadav.

For the 2026 campaign, the team bolstered its squad with trades for Shardul Thakur and Mayank Markande, while re-acquiring Quinton de Kock in the auction.

=== Captains ===
Last updated: 24 May 2026

| Player | Nationality (Note: The information in the nationality column is according to Cricinfo. This information may not necessarily reflect the player's birthplace or citizenship.) | From | To | Matches | Won | Lost | Tied | NR | Win% | Best Result |
|---|---|---|---|---|---|---|---|---|---|---|
| Harbhajan Singh | India | 2008 | 2012 | 30 | 14 | 14 | 0 | 2 | 46.66 | Stand-In |
| Shaun Pollock | South Africa | 2008 | 2008 | 4 | 3 | 1 | 0 | 0 | 75 | Stand-In |
| Sachin Tendulkar | India | 2008 | 2011 | 55 | 32 | 23 | 0 | 0 | 58.18 | Runners-up (2010) |
| Dwayne Bravo | West Indies | 2010 | 2010 | 1 | 0 | 1 | 0 | 0 | 0 | Stand-In |
| Ricky Ponting | Australia | 2013 | 2013 | 6 | 3 | 3 | 0 | 0 | 50 | Captain for the first half (2013) |
| Rohit Sharma | India | 2011 | 2023 | 163 | 91 | 68 | 4 | 0 | 55.82 | Winner (2013, 2015, 2017, 2019, 2020) |
| Kieron Pollard | West Indies | 2014 | 2021 | 9 | 5 | 4 | 0 | 0 | 55.55 | Stand-In |
| Suryakumar Yadav | India | 2023 | 2026 | 5 | 2 | 3 | 0 | 0 | 40 | Stand-In |
| Hardik Pandya | India | 2024 | 2026 | 39 | 15 | 24 | 0 | 0 | 38.46 | Eliminator(2025) |
| Jasprit Bumrah | India | 2026 | 2026 | 1 | 1 | 0 | 0 | 0 | 100 | Stand-In |

== Current squad ==
- Players with international caps are listed in **bold**.
- * denotes a player who is currently unavailable for selection.
- * denotes a player who is unavailable for rest of the season.

| Jersey No. | Name | Nat | Birth date | Batting style | Bowling style | Year signed | Salary | Notes |
Batters
| 45 | **Rohit Sharma** | (India) | 30 April 1987 (age 39) | Right-handed | Right-armoff-break | 2011 | ₹16.3 crore (US$1.7 million) | |
| 63 | **Suryakumar Yadav** | (India) | 14 September 1990 (age 36) | Right-handed | Right-arm off break | 2018 | ₹16.35 crore (US$1.7 million) | vice Captain |
| 9 | **Tilak Varma** | (India) | 8 November 2002 (age 24) | Left-handed | Right-arm off break | 2022 | ₹8 crore (US$850,000) | |
| 68 | **Sherfane Rutherford** | (Guyana) | 15 August 1998 (age 28) | Left-handed | Right-arm fast-medium | 2026 | ₹2.6 crore (US$280,000) | Overseas |
Wicket-keepers
| 12 | **Quinton de Kock** | (South Africa) | 17 December 1992 (age 33) | Left-handed | —N/a | 2026 | ₹1 crore (US$110,000) | Overseas |
| 44 | **Ryan Rickelton** | (South Africa) | 11 July 1996 (age 30) | Left-handed | —N/a | 2025 | ₹1 crore (US$110,000) | Overseas |
All-rounders
| 74 | **Mitchell Santner** | (New Zealand) | 5 February 1992 (age 34) | Left-handed | Left-arm orthodox | 2025 | ₹2 crore (US$210,000) | Overseas |
| 54 | **Shardul Thakur** | (India) | 16 October 1991 (age 35) | Right-handed | Right-arm medium | 2026 | ₹2 crore (US$210,000) | |
| 37 | **Corbin Bosch** | (South Africa) | 10 September 1994 (age 32) | Right-handed | Right-arm fast-medium | 2025 | ₹75 lakh (US$80,000) | Overseas |
| 22 | **Will Jacks** | (England) | 21 November 1998 (age 28) | Right-handed | Right-arm off break | 2025 | ₹5.25 crore (US$560,000) | Overseas |
| 19 | **Naman Dhir** | (India) | 31 December 1999 (age 26) | Right-handed | Right-arm off break | 2024 | ₹5.25 crore (US$560,000) | |
| 8 | Raj Angad Bawa | (India) | 12 November 2002 (age 24) | Left-handed | Right-arm medium-fast | 2025 | ₹30 lakh (US$32,000) | |
Pace bowlers
| 2 | **Arshdeep Singh** | (India) | 5 February 1999 (age 27) | Left-handed | Left-arm medium-fast | 2027 | ₹18 crore (US$1.9 million) | |
| 93 | **Jasprit Bumrah** | (India) | 6 December 1993 (age 32) | Right-handed | Right-arm fast | 2013 | ₹18 crore (US$1.9 million) | |
| 42 | Ashwani Kumar | (India) | 29 August 2001 (age 25) | Left-handed | Left-arm medium-fast | 2025 | ₹30 lakh (US$32,000) | |
Spin bowlers
| 23 | Raghu Sharma | (India) | 11 March 1993 (age 33) | Right-handed | Right-arm leg break | 2025 | ₹30 lakh (US$32,000) | |
Source: MI Squad

== Administration and support staff ==
| Position | Name |
|---|---|
| Director of Cricket | (India) Rahul Sanghvi |
| Icon | (India) Sachin Tendulkar |
| Head Coach | (Trinidad and Tobago) Kieron Pollard |
| Batting Coach | (India) Robin Uthappa |
| Bowling Coach | (New Zealand) Mitchell McClenaghan |
| Fielding Coach | (India) T Dilip |
| Development Bowling Coach | (India) Dhawal Kulkarni |
| Strength and Conditioning Coach | (Australia) Paul Chapman |
| Physiotherapist | (South Africa) Craig Govender |
| Team Manager | (India) Prashant Jangam |
Source: MI Staff

== Seasons ==
=== Indian Premier League ===
| Year | League standing | Final standing |
|---|---|---|
| 2008 | 5th out of 8 | League stage |
| 2009 | 7th out of 8 | League stage |
| 2010 | 1st out of 8 | Runners-up |
| 2011 | 3rd out of 10 | Playoffs |
| 2012 | 3rd out of 9 | Playoffs |
| 2013 | 2nd out of 9 | Champions |
| 2014 | 4th out of 8 | Playoffs |
| 2015 | 2nd out of 8 | Champions |
| 2016 | 5th out of 8 | League stage |
| 2017 | 1st out of 8 | Champions |
| 2018 | 5th out of 8 | League stage |
| 2019 | 1st out of 8 | Champions |
| 2020 | 1st out of 8 | Champions |
| 2021 | 5th out of 8 | League stage |
| 2022 | 10th out of 10 | League stage |
| 2023 | 4th out of 10 | Playoffs |
| 2024 | 10th out of 10 | League stage |
| 2025 | 4th out of 10 | Playoffs |
| 2026 | 9th out of 10 | League stage |

=== Champions League T20 ===
| Year | League standing | Final standing |
|---|---|---|
| 2010 | 7th out of 10 | League stage |
| 2011 | 1st out of 13 | Champions |
| 2012 | 9th out of 14 | League stage |
| 2013 | 1st out of 12 | Champions |
| 2014 | 11th out of 12 | League stage |

== Rivalries ==
=== Rivalry with Chennai Super Kings ===
The Mumbai Indians' most prolific rivalry is with the Chennai Super Kings. The rivalry is generally referred to as the IPL Classico as the two have been the most successful teams since the inception of the IPL, both securing five championships. Chennai Super Kings and Mumbai Indians have played against each other more times than any other two teams in the IPL. The two teams have met each other at the final of the IPL four times—the most for any two franchises in the league's history.

The rivalry reached new heights during the 2010 season when they met in their first IPL Final. Chennai successfully defended a target by winning the match by 22 runs, securing their maiden IPL title. In 2012, the teams faced off in an elimination final at Bangalore, where Chennai dominated Mumbai by 38 runs to knock them out of the playoffs.

In 2013, the two teams met in Qualifier 1 at Delhi, where Chennai thrashed Mumbai by 48 runs to book their final berth. However, Mumbai fought their way back through Qualifier 2, and the two teams met again in the final at Eden Gardens. Mumbai successfully defended a total to win by 23 runs, lifting their very first IPL championship.

They clashed once again in the 2015 IPL Final, also at Eden Gardens. Mumbai put on a commanding performance, setting a high total and restricting Chennai to win the match by 41 runs, securing their second title.

The 2019 season saw absolute dominance by the Mumbai Indians in this matchup, as they defeated Chennai Super Kings in all four of their meetings that year. This included Qualifier 1 and the historic 2019 IPL Final in Hyderabad, where Mumbai successfully defended a modest total, winning a heart-stopping match by just 1 run on the final ball to claim their record-breaking fourth title.

As of the 2026 IPL season, the two franchises have faced each other 43 times across all competitions, with Mumbai Indians holding a narrow lead of 22 victories to Chennai's 21. However, the tide has turned significantly in recent years. Since the 2020 season, Chennai Super Kings have dominated the matchup, winning 9 out of the 13 encounters against Mumbai. This momentum continued into the 2026 season, where Chennai Super Kings achieved a clean sweep over Mumbai by winning both of their matches—a massive 103-run victory at the Wankhede Stadium and an 8-wicket win at Chepauk.

==== Head-to-Head Statistics ====
Overall Head-to-Head Record (As of May 2026)
| Tournament | Matches Played | Mumbai Indians Wins | Chennai Super Kings Wins | No Result |
|---|---|---|---|---|
| Indian Premier League | 41 | 21 | 20 | 0 |
| Champions League Twenty20 | 2 | 1 | 1 | 0 |
| Total | 43 | 22 | 21 | 0 |

=== Rivalry with Kolkata Knight Riders ===
Both teams play in major markets, with Mumbai Indians based in Mumbai and Kolkata Knight Riders based in Kolkata. Mumbai Indians is the most successful IPL franchise with five championships. However, until Mumbai's third championship, both teams were tied with two championships each. In the first two seasons of the IPL, Mumbai swept Kolkata in all four games. It wasn't until the 2010 IPL season that Kolkata won against Mumbai. Both teams have been captained by Indian cricket legends at one point (Mumbai was captained by Sachin Tendulkar and Kolkata was captained by Sourav Ganguly). This rivalry has often played out in Mumbai's favour, as they have won 22 games compared to Kolkata's seven wins. They have faced each other twice in the playoffs.

In 2011, both teams played against each other in the Eliminator round, marking their first playoff appearances. This was the first time that the two teams met in the playoffs. Mumbai won the match by four wickets and advanced to the next round, ultimately losing to the Royal Challengers Bangalore.

In 2012, both teams were chasing a playoff spot in the tournament. The game started poorly for KKR as their batting team struggled to score runs. However, KKR picked up the pace and ended the innings with 140/7. Mumbai, initially in a strong position at 60/2 with more than 10 overs left, unexpectedly collapsed, finishing their innings at 108 all out. Sunil Narine was named Man of the Match with 4 wickets, and KKR eliminated MI from the playoffs. KKR won its first championship that season. Knight Riders' owner Shah Rukh Khan was handed a 5-year ban at Wankhede Stadium, the home ground of Mumbai Indians. He was accused of walking on the field post-match and abusing the security guards. In 2015, the ban was lifted.

Mumbai and Kolkata faced off in the opening match of the 2015 season. Mumbai batted first and scored 168/3. This charge was led by captain Rohit Sharma with his 98 runs. Kolkata captain Gautam Gambhir scored 57 runs, leading his team to victory. Suryakumar Yadav's 46 runs were crucial to KKR's chase.

In 2017, Mumbai earned its 100th T20 win against KKR. Later that season, both teams faced each other in the playoffs in the Qualifier 2 round. KKR had a poor batting performance, posting 107 runs and being all out. Mumbai was able to capitalise and won the match. Mumbai went on to the finals to beat Rising Pune Supergiant to claim their third championship.

From 2015 to 2018, Mumbai Indians held an eight-game winning streak against the Kolkata Knight Riders. That streak was broken on 29 April 2019, when KKR posted a total of 232 runs and won by 34 runs. KKR's Andre Russell scored 80 runs, and MI's Hardik Pandya scored 91 runs. KKR holds the record for highest total for an IPL match played at Eden Gardens. This victory was KKR's 100th T20 win. Mumbai have won all three games between them since then.

In the 2022 and 2024 season, Kolkata beat Mumbai in all the matches between them. As of 2024, in the 34 matches both teams have played so far, Mumbai Indians are leading ahead with a staggering 23 wins while Kolkata only has 11 victories.

== Philanthropy ==
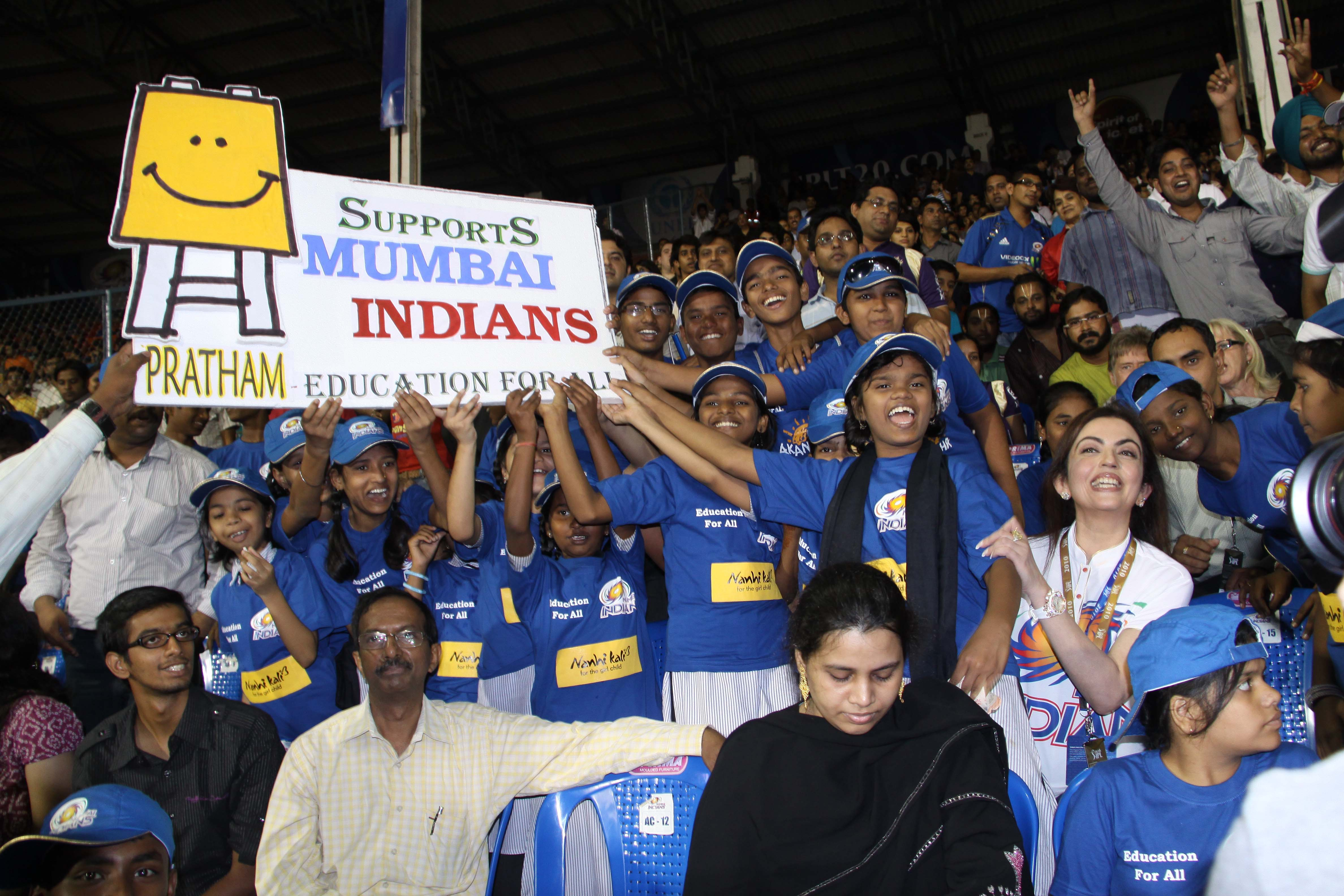
Mumbai Indians invited children of the NGOs to watch matches for free.

Mumbai Indians have supported the social cause of education to the underprivileged. They have raised funds for the cause via selling merchandise like wristbands signed by their players. The NGOs supported are Pratham, Ummeed, Akanksha, Teach For India and Nanhi Kali.

== Statistics ==
=== Overall results in the IPL ===
Last updated: 5 May 2025

| Indian Premier League Edition | Number of Matches Played | Number of Matches Won | Number of Matches Lost | Number of Matches Washed Out | Success Rate [%] | Points Table Standings | Final position |
|---|---|---|---|---|---|---|---|
| 2008 | 14 | 7 | 7 | 0 | 50.00% | 5th out of 8 | League stage |
| 2009 | 14 | 5 | 8 | 1 | 35.71% | 7th out of 8 | League stage |
| 2010 | 16 | 11 | 5 | 0 | 68.75% | 1st out of 8 | Runners-up |
| 2011 | 16 | 10 | 6 | 0 | 62.50% | 3rd out of 10 | Play-offs : Qualifier 2 |
| 2012 | 17 | 10 | 7 | 0 | 58.82% | 3rd out of 9 | Play-offs : Eliminator |
| 2013 | 19 | 13 | 6 | 0 | 68.42% | 2nd out of 9 | Champions |
| 2014 | 15 | 7 | 8 | 0 | 46.67% | 4th out of 8 | Play-offs : Eliminator |
| 2015 | 16 | 10 | 6 | 0 | 62.50% | 2nd out of 8 | Champions |
| 2016 | 14 | 7 | 7 | 0 | 50.00% | 5th out of 8 | League stage |
| 2017 | 17 | 12 | 5 | 0 | 70.59% | 1st out of 8 | Champions |
| 2018 | 14 | 6 | 8 | 0 | 42.86% | 5th out of 8 | League stage |
| 2019 | 16 | 11 | 5 | 0 | 68.75% | 1st out of 8 | Champions |
| 2020 | 16 | 11 | 5 | 0 | 68.75% | 1st out of 8 | Champions |
| 2021 | 14 | 7 | 7 | 0 | 50.00% | 5th out of 8 | League stage |
| 2022 | 14 | 4 | 10 | 0 | 28.57% | 10th out of 10 | League stage |
| 2023 | 16 | 9 | 7 | 0 | 56.25% | 4th out of 10 | Play-offs : Qualifier 2 |
| 2024 | 14 | 4 | 10 | 0 | 28.57% | 10th out of 10 | League stage |
| 2025 | 16 | 9 | 7 | 0 | 56.25% | 4th out of 10 | Play-offs : Qualifier 2 |
| Total | 273 | 151 | 121 | 1 | 55.31% | | |

=== By opposition ===
Last updated: 26 May 2026

| Opposition | Played | Won | Lost | NR | Win % | Win Ratio (W/L) | Expected Wins (per 10) |
|---|---|---|---|---|---|---|---|
| Chennai Super Kings | 43 | 22 | 21 | 0 | 51.16% | 1.05 | 5.1 |
| Delhi Capitals | 40 | 22 | 18 | 0 | 55.00% | 1.22 | 5.5 |
| Kolkata Knight Riders | 38 | 25 | 13 | 0 | 65.79% | 1.92 | 6.6 |
| Punjab Kings | 36 | 18 | 18 | 0 | 50.00% | 1.00 | 5.0 |
| Rajasthan Royals | 35 | 17 | 18 | 0 | 48.57% | 0.94 | 4.9 |
| Royal Challengers Bengaluru | 39 | 21 | 18 | 0 | 53.85% | 1.17 | 5.4 |
| Sunrisers Hyderabad | 27 | 14 | 13 | 0 | 51.85% | 1.08 | 5.2 |
| Lucknow Super Giants | 9 | 3 | 6 | 0 | 33.33% | 0.50 | 3.3 |
| Gujarat Titans | 9 | 4 | 5 | 0 | 44.44% | 0.80 | 4.4 |
| Deccan Chargers | 10 | 6 | 4 | 0 | 60.00% | 1.50 | 6.0 |
| Gujarat Lions | 4 | 2 | 2 | 0 | 50.00% | 1.00 | 5.0 |
| Kochi Tuskers Kerala | 1 | 0 | 1 | 0 | 0.00% | 0.00 | 0.0 |
| Pune Warriors India | 6 | 5 | 1 | 0 | 83.33% | 5.00 | 8.3 |
| Rising Pune Supergiant | 6 | 2 | 4 | 0 | 33.33% | 0.50 | 3.3 |
| Cape Cobras | 1 | 0 | 0 | 1 | 0.00% | 0.00 | 0.0 |
| Guyana | 1 | 1 | 0 | 0 | 100.00% | — | 10.0 |
| Highveld Lions | 2 | 1 | 1 | 0 | 50.00% | 1.00 | 5.0 |
| Lahore Lions | 1 | 0 | 1 | 0 | 0.00% | 0.00 | 0.0 |
| New South Wales Blues | 1 | 0 | 1 | 0 | 0.00% | 0.00 | 0.0 |
| Perth Scorchers | 1 | 1 | 0 | 0 | 100.00% | — | 10.0 |
| Otago Volts | 1 | 0 | 0 | 1 | 0.00% | 0.00 | 0.0 |
| Somerset | 1 | 1 | 0 | 0 | 100.00% | — | 10.0 |
| Southern Redbacks | 1 | 0 | 1 | 0 | 0.00% | 0.00 | 0.0 |
| Sydney Sixers | 1 | 0 | 1 | 0 | 0.00% | 0.00 | 0.0 |
| Trinidad and Tobago | 2 | 2 | 0 | 0 | 100.00% | — | 10.0 |
| Yorkshire Carnegie | 1 | 0 | 0 | 1 | 0.00% | 0.00 | 0.0 |

| Colour Indication | Teams now defunct |
| Colour Indication | Non-IPL/ Overseas played in CLT20 |

=== Most runs ===
Rohit Sharma remains the leading run-scorer for the franchise. In 2025, Suryakumar Yadav set a new record for the most runs in a single season by a non-opener (717 runs).

| Rank | Player | Span | Matches | Innings | Runs | Average | High Score |
|---|---|---|---|---|---|---|---|
| 1 | **Rohit Sharma** | 2011–present | 221 | 216 | **5,698** | 29.86 | 109* |
| 2 | **Suryakumar Yadav** | 2018–present | 106 | 104 | **3,413** | 37.00 | 103* |
| 3 | Kieron Pollard | 2010–2022 | 189 | 171 | **3,412** | 28.67 | 87* |
| 4 | Ambati Rayudu | 2010–2017 | 114 | 107 | **2,416** | 27.14 | 81* |
| 5 | Sachin Tendulkar | 2008–2013 | 78 | 78 | **2,334** | 34.83 | 100* |

Active players are listed in bold. Stats current as of March 2026.

=== Most wickets ===
Jasprit Bumrah is the all-time leading wicket-taker for Mumbai Indians, surpassing Lasith Malinga during the 2025 season. In early 2026, he became the first Indian pacer to reach 180 wickets for a single franchise.

| Rank | Player | Span | Matches | Wickets | Average | Economy | Best Bowling |
|---|---|---|---|---|---|---|---|
| 1 | **Jasprit Bumrah** | 2013–present | 145 | **183** | 22.84 | 7.25 | 5/10 |
| 2 | Lasith Malinga | 2009–2019 | 122 | **170** | 19.80 | 7.14 | 5/13 |
| 3 | Harbhajan Singh | 2008–2017 | 136 | **127** | 26.65 | 6.95 | 5/18 |
| 4 | Mitchell McClenaghan | 2015–2019 | 56 | **71** | 25.39 | 8.49 | 4/21 |
| 5 | Kieron Pollard | 2010–2022 | 189 | **69** | 31.59 | 8.77 | 4/44 |

Active players are listed in bold. Stats current as of March 2026.

== In popular culture ==
In the 2019 Netflix documentary series Cricket Fever: Mumbai Indians, the journey of the team was covered. This was the first sports related show from India to be produced by Netflix and they became the first IPL team to be featured in a documentary by Netflix.

=== Global influence and ownership structure ===
The Mumbai Indians franchise is owned by Reliance Industries, India's largest conglomerate, through its 100% subsidiary, Indiawin Sports Private Limited. Under the leadership of Nita Ambani and Akash Ambani, the franchise has transitioned from a single IPL team into a global cricketing conglomerate.

By 2026, the "MI" brand established a presence in five major international cricket markets across four continents. This "One Family" philosophy ensures a unified coaching and scouting structure across all affiliated teams, led by Global Head of Cricket Mahela Jayawardene.

The franchise's global footprint includes:

- India: Mumbai Indians (IPL) and Mumbai Indians (WPL).
- South Africa: MI Cape Town (SA20).
- United Arab Emirates: MI Emirates (ILT20).
- United States: MI New York (MLC).
- United Kingdom: In early 2026, the franchise completed a strategic rebranding of the Oval Invincibles to MI London, becoming the first IPL owner to have a primary identity in The Hundred.

As of 2026, the Mumbai Indians brand is valued at over $1.5 billion, making it one of the most valuable sports properties globally.

== Affiliated teams ==
In addition to the primary IPL franchise, the Mumbai Indians brand includes several global teams across various Twenty20 leagues:

- Mumbai Indians (WPL) – A women's cricket team based in Mumbai that competes in the Women's Premier League (WPL). They were the inaugural champions in 2023, and retained the trophy in 2025
- MI Cape Town – Based in Cape Town, South Africa, competing in the SA20 league. They won SA20 2025 and their maiden SA20 trophy, by defeating the Sunrisers Eastern Cape in the final.
- MI Emirates – Based in Abu Dhabi, UAE, competing in the International League T20 (ILT20). They secured their first title in 2024.
- MI New York – Based in New York, USA, competing in Major League Cricket (MLC). They won the inaugural MLC championship in 2023, and won for the 2nd time in 2025.
- MI London – Formerly known as the Oval Invincibles, the franchise was officially rebranded as MI London in early 2026 following an expanded partnership between Reliance Industries and the team's ownership in The Hundred.
