= 2013 Mumbai Indians season =

Indian Premier League cricket team season

Mumbai Indians
2013 season
- Coach: John Wright
- Captain: Ricky Ponting (6 matches); Rohit Sharma (13 matches)
- IPL: Champions
- CLT20: Champions

Mumbai Indians (MI) are a franchise cricket team based in Mumbai, India, which plays in the Indian Premier League (IPL). They were one of the nine teams that took part in the 2013 Indian Premier League. They were captained by former Australian captain Ricky Ponting during the initial stages of the IPL, but he was later replaced by Rohit Sharma.

Mumbai Indians beat the Chennai Super Kings at the 2013 Indian Premier League final to win their first IPL title. They also emerged victorious at the 2013 Champions League Twenty20, which was their second CLT20 title. This was the last season Sachin Tendulkar played for the side.

== Squad ==
- Players with international caps before the start of 2013 IPL are listed in **bold**.
- * denotes players part of the 2013 CLT20 squad.

No.	Name	Nationality	Birth date	Batting Style	Bowling Style	Notes
Batsmen
06	Aiden Blizzard	Australia	27 June 1984 (aged 28)	Left-handed	Left-arm medium	Overseas
09	**Ambati Rayudu**	India	23 September 1985 (aged 27)	Right-handed	Right-arm off break	Occasional wicketkeeper
10	**Sachin Tendulkar**	India	24 April 1973 (aged 39)	Right-handed	Right-arm off break	
14	**Ricky Ponting**	Australia	19 December 1974 (aged 38)	Right-handed	Right-arm medium	Overseas; Captain (Initial Stages)
16	Suryakumar Yadav	India	14 September 1990 (aged 22)	Right-handed	Right-arm medium	
45	**Rohit Sharma**	India	30 April 1987 (aged 25)	Right-handed	Right-arm off break	Captain (Later Stages)
64	**Phillip Hughes**	Australia	30 November 1988 (aged 24)	Left-handed	–	Overseas
All-rounders
01	Rishi Dhawan	India	19 February 1990 (aged 23)	Right-handed	Right-arm medium-fast	
07	**James Franklin**	New Zealand	7 November 1980 (aged 32)	Left-handed	Left-arm medium	Overseas
20	Axar Patel	India	20 January 1994 (aged 19)	Left-handed	Slow left arm orthodox	
24	**Jacob Oram**	New Zealand	28 July 1978 (aged 34)	Left-handed	Right arm fast-medium	Overseas
32	**Glenn Maxwell**	Australia	14 October 1988 (aged 24)	Right-handed	Right-arm off break	Overseas
50	**Dwayne Smith**	Barbados	12 April 1983 (aged 29)	Right-handed	Right-arm medium	Overseas
51	Jalaj Saxena	India	15 December 1986 (aged 26)	Right-handed	Right-arm off break	
55	**Kieron Pollard**	Trinidad and Tobago	12 May 1987 (aged 25)	Right-handed	Right arm medium-fast	Overseas; Vice-Captain
89	Amitoze Singh	India	15 February 1989 (aged 24)	Right-handed	Right-arm medium	
Wicket-keepers
04	Sushant Marathe	India	16 October 1985 (aged 27)	Left-handed	Right-arm leg break	
19	**Dinesh Karthik**	India	1 June 1985 (aged 27)	Right-handed	Right-arm off break	
27	Aditya Tare	India	7 November 1987 (aged 25)	Right-handed	–	
Bowlers
02	Javed Khan	India	20 October 1990 (aged 22)	Right-handed	Right-arm medium-fast	
03	**Harbhajan Singh**	India	3 July 1980 (aged 32)	Right-handed	Right-arm off break	
05	Abu Nechim	India	5 November 1988 (aged 24)	Right-handed	Right-arm medium-fast	
12	Jasprit Bumrah	India	6 December 1993 (aged 19)	Right-handed	Right-arm medium-fast	
13	**Munaf Patel**	India	12 July 1983 (aged 29)	Right-handed	Right-arm medium-fast	
18	**Nathan Coulter-Nile**	Australia	11 October 1987 (aged 25)	Right-handed	Right-arm fast-medium	Overseas
23	Yuzvendra Chahal	India	23 July 1990 (aged 22)	Right-handed	Right-arm leg break	
25	**Mitchell Johnson**	Australia	2 November 1981 (aged 31)	Left-handed	Left-arm fast	Overseas
30	**Pragyan Ojha**	India	5 September 1986 (aged 26)	Left-handed	Slow left arm orthodox	
33	Pawan Suyal	India	15 October 1989 (aged 23)	Right-handed	Left-arm fast-medium	
91	Dhawal Kulkarni	India	10 December 1988 (aged 24)	Right-handed	Right-arm medium-fast	
99	**Lasith Malinga**	Sri Lanka	28 August 1983 (aged 29)	Right-handed	Right-arm fast	Overseas

== Indian Premier League ==
=== Season standings ===
Pos	Team	Pld	W	L	NR	Pts	NRR
1	Chennai Super Kings (R)	16	11	5	0	22	0.530
2	Mumbai Indians (C)	16	11	5	0	22	0.441
3	Rajasthan Royals	16	10	6	0	20	0.322
4	Sunrisers Hyderabad	16	10	6	0	20	0.003
5	Royal Challengers Bangalore	16	9	7	0	18	0.457
6	Kings XI Punjab	16	8	8	0	16	0.226
7	Kolkata Knight Riders	16	6	10	0	12	−0.095
8	Pune Warriors India	16	4	12	0	8	−1.006
9	Delhi Daredevils	16	3	13	0	6	−0.848

"C" refers to the champions of the tournament, R to the runners-up.

=== Match log ===
No.	Date	Opponent	Venue	Result	Scorecard
1	April 4	Royal Challengers Bangalore	Bengaluru	Lost by 2 runs	Scorecard
2	April 6	Chennai Super Kings	Chennai	Won by 9 runs; MoM – Kieron Pollard 57* (38)	Scorecard
3	April 9	Delhi Daredevils	Mumbai	Won by 44 runs; MoM – Dinesh Karthik 86 (48)	Scorecard
4	April 13	Pune Warriors India	Mumbai	Won by 41 runs; MoM – Rohit Sharma 62* (32)	Scorecard
5	April 17	Rajasthan Royals	Jaipur	Lost by 87 runs	Scorecard
6	April 21	Delhi Daredevils	New Delhi	Lost by 9 wickets	Scorecard
7	April 24	Kolkata Knight Riders	Kolkata	Won by 5 wickets; MoM – Dwayne Smith 62 (45)	Scorecard
8	April 27	Royal Challengers Bangalore	Mumbai	Won by 58 runs; MoM – Dwayne Smith 50 (36) and 2/20	Scorecard
9	April 29	Kings XI Punjab	Mumbai	Won by 4 runs; MoM – Rohit Sharma 79* (39)	Scorecard
10	May 1	Sunrisers Hyderabad	Hyderabad	Lost by 7 wickets	Scorecard
11	May 5	Chennai Super Kings	Mumbai	Won by 60 runs; MoM – Mitchell Johnson 3/27 (3 overs)	Scorecard
12	May 7	Kolkata Knight Riders	Mumbai	Won by 65 Runs; MoM – Sachin Tendulkar 48 (28)	Scorecard
13	May 11	Pune Warriors India	Pune	Won by 5 Wickets; MoM – Mitchell Johnson 2/8 (4 overs)	Scorecard
14	May 13	Sunrisers Hyderabad	Mumbai	Won by 7 wickets; MoM – Kieron Pollard 66* (27)	Scorecard
15	May 15	Rajasthan Royals	Mumbai	Won by 14 Runs; MoM – Aditya Tare 59 (37)	Scorecard
16	May 18	Kings XI Punjab	Dharamsala	Lost by 50 Runs	Scorecard
Qualifier 1
17	May 21	Chennai Super Kings	New Delhi	Lost by 48 Runs	Scorecard
Qualifier 2
18	May 24	Rajasthan Royals	Kolkata	Won by 4 wickets; MoM Harbhajan Singh 3/23, 2 catches and 6* (4)	Scorecard
Final
19	May 26	Chennai Super Kings	Kolkata	Won by 23 Runs; MoM – Kieron Pollard 60* (32)	Scorecard
Overall record:13–6. Champions. Qualified for 2013 Champions League Twenty20.

== Champions League Twenty20 ==
=== Group standings ===
Team	Pld	W	L	NR	Pts	NRR
Rajasthan Royals	4	4	0	0	16	+0.960
Mumbai Indians	4	2	1	1	10	+1.068
Otago Volts	4	2	1	1	10	+0.869
Highveld Lions	4	0	3	1	2	–0.726
Perth Scorchers	4	0	3	1	2	–2.851

=== Match log ===
No.	Date	Opponent	Venue	Result	Scorecard
1	September 21	Rajasthan Royals	Jaipur	Lost by 7 wickets	Scorecard
2	September 23	Otago Volts	Ahmedabad	Match did not start after intermittent rain	Scorecard
3	September 27	Highveld Lions	Jaipur	Won by 7 wickets; MoM Dwayne Smith 63 (47) and 1 catch	Scorecard
4	October 2	Perth Scorchers	Delhi	Won by 6 wickets; MoM Rohit Sharma 51* (24)	Scorecard
Semifinal
5	October 5	Trinidad & Tobago	Delhi	Won by 6 wickets; MoM Dwayne Smith 59 (38)	Scorecard
Final
6	October 6	Rajasthan Royals	Delhi	Won by 33 runs; MoM – Harbhajan Singh 4/32 and 1 catch	Scorecard
Overall record: 4–1. Champions.
