= 2026 Delhi Capitals season =

Indian Premier League cricket team

Delhi Capitals
2026 season
- Arun Jaitley Stadium, home ground of Delhi Capitals
- Coach: Hemang Badani
- Captain: Axar Patel
- Ground(s): Arun Jaitley Stadium, Delhi
- League stage: 6th place
- Most runs: KL Rahul (593)
- Most wickets: Lungi Ngidi (13)
- Most catches: David Miller; Axar Patel; Tristan Stubbs (7 each)
- Most wicket-keeping dismissals: KL Rahul (3)

The 2026 season was Delhi Capitals' nineteenth appearance in the Indian Premier League (IPL). They were one of the ten cricket teams that competed in the 2026 IPL. The team was captained by Axar Patel and coached by Hemang Badani.

Delhi Capitals were the fourth team to be eliminated from the 2026 IPL and finished the season in sixth place with seven wins from 14 matches. KL Rahul scored the most runs (593) while Lungi Ngidi took the most wickets (13) for Delhi in the 2026 season.

== Pre-season ==
The 2026 Indian Premier League was the 19th edition of the Indian Premier League (IPL), a professional Twenty20 (T20) cricket league held in India, organised by the Board of Control for Cricket in India (BCCI). Delhi Capitals are one of the three active franchises to not have won the IPL title yet. The team finished in fifth place in the previous season. The tournament featured ten teams competing in 74 matches from 28 March to 31 May 2026. Delhi played all their home matches at Arun Jaitley Stadium.

=== Player retention ===
Franchises were allowed to retain any number of players from their squad, including traded players while excluding players signed as temporary replacements. Franchises were required to submit their retention lists before 15 November 2025. Delhi retained seventeen players, including captain Axar Patel. Delhi also traded Donovan Ferreira to Rajasthan Royals in return for Nitish Rana.

Retained players
Domestic		Overseas
Mukesh Kumar; Ajay Mandal; Karun Nair; T. Natarajan; Vipraj Nigam; Axar Patel; Abhishek Porel	KL Rahul; Nitish Rana (Note: Delhi Capitals traded Donovan Ferreira to Rajasthan Royals in return for Nitish Rana.); Sameer Rizvi; Ashutosh Sharma; Madhav Tiwari; Tripurana Vijay; Kuldeep Yadav	Dushmantha Chameera; Mitchell Starc; Tristan Stubbs

Released players
Batters	Wicket-keepers	All-rounders	Bowlers
Sediqullah Atal; Harry Brook; Faf du Plessis; Jake Fraser-McGurk	—N/a	Donovan Ferreira; Manvanth Kumar	Darshan Nalkande; Mustafizur Rahman; Mohit Sharma (Note: Mohit Sharma announced his retirement from IPL in December 2025.)

=== Auction ===
The season's auction took place on 16 December 2025 in Abu Dhabi, United Arab Emirates. The auction purse for each franchise was set at ₹125 crore (US$13 million), with franchises being deducted an amount from the purse for every retained player. Delhi had a purse remaining of ₹21.8 crore (US$2.3 million). Delhi bought eight players in the auction, including six capped players and five overseas players.

Auctioned players
Domestic		Overseas	
Capped	Uncapped	Capped	Uncapped
Prithvi Shaw	Auqib Nabi; Sahil Parekh	David Miller; Ben Duckett; Pathum Nissanka; Kyle Jamieson; Lungi Ngidi	—N/a

== Squad ==
- Players with international caps as of start of 2026 IPL are listed in **bold**.
- Ages are as of 28 March 2026.
- Withdrawn players are indicated by a dagger symbol (†) and placed at the bottom of the table.

Delhi Capitals squad for the 2026 Indian Premier League
S/N	Name	Nationality	Birth date	Batting style	Bowling style	Salary	Notes
1	**KL Rahul**	India	18 April 1992 (aged 33)	Right-handed	Right-arm medium	₹14 crore (US$1.5 million)	
7	Sameer Rizvi	India	6 December 2003 (aged 22)	Right-handed	Right arm off-break	₹95 lakh (US$100,000)	
10	**David Miller**	South Africa	10 June 1989 (aged 36)	Left-handed	Right-arm off break	₹2 crore (US$210,000)	Overseas
20	**Axar Patel**	India	20 January 1994 (aged 32)	Left-handed	Left-arm orthodox	₹16.5 crore (US$1.8 million)	Captain
22	**Lungi Ngidi**	South Africa	29 March 1996 (aged 29)	Right-handed	Right-arm fast-medium	₹2 crore (US$210,000)	Overseas
23	**Kuldeep Yadav**	India	14 December 1994 (aged 31)	Left-handed	Left-arm wrist spin	₹13.25 crore (US$1.4 million)	
24	Abhishek Porel	India	17 October 2002 (aged 23)	Left-handed	—N/a	₹4 crore (US$430,000)	
28	Vipraj Nigam	India	28 July 2004 (aged 21)	Right-handed	Right-arm legbreak	₹50 lakh (US$53,000)	
30	**Tristan Stubbs**	South Africa	14 August 2000 (aged 25)	Right-handed	—N/a	₹10 crore (US$1.1 million)	Overseas
36	**Nitish Rana**	India	27 December 1993 (aged 32)	Left-handed	Right-arm off break	₹4.2 crore (US$450,000)	
49	**Mukesh Kumar**	India	12 October 1993 (aged 32)	Right-handed	Right-arm medium	₹8 crore (US$850,000)	
50	Tripurana Vijay	India	5 September 2001 (aged 24)	Right-handed	Right arm off-break	₹30 lakh (US$32,000)	
56	**Mitchell Starc**	Australia	30 January 1990 (aged 36)	Left-handed	Left-arm fast	₹11.75 crore (US$1.3 million)	Overseas
77	Ashutosh Sharma	India	15 September 1998 (aged 27)	Right-handed	—N/a	₹3.80 crore (US$410,000)	
—N/a	**Rehan Ahmed**	England	13 August 2004 (aged 21)	Right-handed	Right-arm leg break	₹75 lakh (US$80,000)	Overseas; replacement (Note: Rehan Ahmed replaced Ben Duckett, after the latter withdrew due to national duty.)
—N/a	**Dushmantha Chameera**	Sri Lanka	11 January 1992 (aged 34)	Right-handed	Right-arm fast	₹75 lakh (US$80,000)	Overseas
—N/a	**Kyle Jamieson**	New Zealand	30 December 1994 (aged 31)	Right-handed	Right-arm fast-medium	₹2 crore (US$210,000)	Overseas
—N/a	Ajay Mandal	India	25 February 1996 (aged 30)	Left-handed	Left-arm orthodox	₹30 lakh (US$32,000)	
—N/a	**Pathum Nissanka**	Sri Lanka	29 March 1998 (aged 27)	Right-handed	Right-arm fast-medium	₹4 crore (US$430,000)	Overseas
—N/a	Auqib Nabi	India	4 November 1996 (aged 29)	Right-handed	Right arm medium	₹8.40 crore (US$900,000)	
—N/a	**Karun Nair**	India	6 December 1991 (aged 34)	Right-handed	Right-arm off break	₹50 lakh (US$53,000)	
—N/a	**T. Natarajan**	India	4 April 1991 (aged 34)	Left-handed	Left-arm medium	₹10.75 crore (US$1.1 million)	
—N/a	Sahil Parakh	India	7 June 2007 (aged 18)	Left-handed	Left-arm leg-break	₹30 lakh (US$32,000)	
—N/a	**Prithvi Shaw**	India	9 November 1999 (aged 26)	Right-handed	Right-handed off-break	₹75 lakh (US$80,000)	
—N/a	Madhav Tiwari	India	28 September 2003 (aged 22)	Right-handed	Right arm medium	₹40 lakh (US$43,000)	
—N/a	**Ben Duckett** †	England	17 October 1994 (aged 31)	Left-handed	Right-arm off break	₹2 crore (US$210,000)	Overseas; withdrawn

== Support staff ==
Ian Bell replaced Matthew Mott as an assistant coach.

Position	Name
Head coach	Hemang Badani
Assistant coach	Ian Bell
Bowling coach	Munaf Patel

- Source: News18

== League stage ==
Delhi Capitals began their season with two wins against Lucknow Super Giants and Mumbai Indians. They lost their next two matches to Gujarat Titans and Chennai Super Kings but won against Royal Challengers Bengaluru. They lost their next three matches to Sunrisers Hyderabad, Punjab Kings and Bengaluru; won against Rajasthan and lost the next two to Chennai and Kolkata Knight Riders. They won their last three matches of the season against Punjab, Rajasthan and Kolkata to finish the league stage at the sixth place with fourteen points and were the fourth team to be eliminated.

=== Points table ===
League stage standings
Pos	Grp	Team	Pld	W	L	NR	Pts	NRR	Qualification
1	A	Royal Challengers Bengaluru (C)	14	9	5	0	18	0.783	Advanced to Qualifier 1
2	B	Gujarat Titans (R)	14	9	5	0	18	0.695	Advanced to Qualifier 1
3	B	Sunrisers Hyderabad (4th)	14	9	5	0	18	0.524	Advanced to Eliminator
4	A	Rajasthan Royals (3rd)	14	8	6	0	16	0.189	Advanced to Eliminator
5	A	Punjab Kings	14	7	6	1	15	0.309	Eliminated
6	B	Delhi Capitals	14	7	7	0	14	−0.651	Eliminated
7	A	Kolkata Knight Riders	14	6	7	1	13	−0.147	Eliminated
8	A	Chennai Super Kings	14	6	8	0	12	−0.345	Eliminated
9	B	Mumbai Indians	14	4	10	0	8	−0.584	Eliminated
10	B	Lucknow Super Giants	14	4	10	0	8	−0.740	Eliminated

Source: ESPNcricinfo
Rules for classification: 1) Points; 2) Wins; 3) Net run rate; 4) Wickets taken per fair deliveries; 5) drawing lots
(C) Champions; (R) Runners-up

=== League progression ===
League progression
Team	Group matches														Playoffs		
Team	1	2	3	4	5	6	7	8	9	10	11	12	13	14	Q1/E	Q2	F
Delhi Capitals	2	4	4	4	6	6	6	6	8	8	8	10	12	14			

Win	Loss	No result

- Note: The total points at the end of each group match are listed.
- Note: Click on the points (group matches) or W/L (playoffs) to see the match summary.

=== Fixtures ===
Match 5
1 April 2026
19:30 (N)
Scorecard

Lucknow Super Giants (H); 141 (18.4 overs)	v	Delhi Capitals; 145/4 (17.1 overs)
Abdul Samad 36 (25); Lungi Ngidi 3/27 (3.4 overs)		Sameer Rizvi 70* (47); Prince Yadav 2/20 (3 overs)

Delhi Capitals won by 6 wickets
Ekana Cricket Stadium, Lucknow
Umpires: Ulhas Gandhe (Ind) and Rohan Pandit (Ind)
Player of the match: Sameer Rizvi (Delhi Capitals)

- Delhi Capitals won the toss and elected to field.
- Pathum Nissanka (Delhi Capitals) made his IPL debut.

Match 8
4 April 2026
15:30 (D/N)
Scorecard

Mumbai Indians; 162/6 (20 overs)	v	Delhi Capitals (H); 164/4 (18.1 overs)
Suryakumar Yadav 51 (36); Mukesh Kumar 2/26 (3 overs)		Sameer Rizvi 90 (51); Deepak Chahar 1/20 (3 overs)

Delhi Capitals won by 6 wickets
Arun Jaitley Stadium, Delhi
Umpires: Kumar Dharmasena (SL) and Mohit Krishnadas (Ind)
Player of the match: Sameer Rizvi (Delhi Capitals)

- Delhi Capitals won the toss and elected to field.

Match 14
8 April 2026
19:30 (N)
Scorecard

Gujarat Titans; 210/4 (20 overs)	v	Delhi Capitals (H); 209/8 (20 overs)
Shubman Gill 70 (45); Mukesh Kumar 2/55 (4 overs)		KL Rahul 92 (52); Rashid Khan 3/17 (4 overs)

Gujarat Titans won by 1 run
Arun Jaitley Stadium, Delhi
Umpires: Nitin Menon (Ind) and Anish Sahasrabudhe (Ind)
Player of the match: Rashid Khan (Gujarat Titans)

- Delhi Capitals won the toss and elected to field.
- Jos Buttler (Gujarat Titans) became the first non-West Indies' batter to score 600 sixes in T20s.

Match 18
11 April 2026
19:30 (N)
Scorecard

Chennai Super Kings (H); 212/2 (20 overs)	v	Delhi Capitals; 189 (20 overs)
Sanju Samson 115* (56); Axar Patel 1/39 (4 overs)		Tristan Stubbs 60 (38); Jamie Overton 4/18 (4 overs)

Chennai Super Kings won by 23 runs
M. A. Chidambaram Stadium, Chennai
Umpires: Saidarshan Kumar (Ind) and Vinod Seshan (Ind)
Player of the match: Sanju Samson (Chennai Super Kings)

- Delhi Capitals won the toss and elected to field.
- Sanju Samson (Chennai Super Kings) scored his 400th six in T20s.

Match 26
18 April 2026
15:30 (D/N)
Scorecard

Royal Challengers Bengaluru (H); 175/8 (20 overs)	v	Delhi Capitals; 179/4 (19.5 overs)
Phil Salt 63 (38); Axar Patel 2/18 (3 overs)		Tristan Stubbs 60* (47); Bhuvneshwar Kumar 4/26 (4 overs)

Delhi Capitals won by 6 wickets
M. Chinnaswamy Stadium, Bengaluru
Umpires: Abhijit Bhattacharya (Ind) and Bhavesh Patel (Ind)
Player of the match: Tristan Stubbs (Delhi Capitals)

- Delhi Capitals won the toss and elected to field.
- Royal Challengers Bengaluru became the first IPL team to play in 100 matches at a home venue.

Match 31
21 April 2026
19:30 (N)
Scorecard

Sunrisers Hyderabad (H); 242/2 (20 overs)	v	Delhi Capitals; 195/9 (20 overs)
Abhishek Sharma 135* (68); Axar Patel 1/23 (2 overs)		Nitish Rana 57 (30); Eshan Malinga 4/32 (4 overs)

Sunrisers Hyderabad won by 47 runs
Rajiv Gandhi Stadium, Hyderabad
Umpires: Anish Sahasrabudhe (Ind) and Vinod Seshan (Ind)
Player of the match: Abhishek Sharma (Sunrisers Hyderabad)

- Delhi Capitals won the toss and elected to field.
- Dilshan Madushanka (Sunrisers Hyderabad) made his IPL debut.

Match 35
25 April 2026
15:30 (D/N)
Scorecard

Delhi Capitals (H); 264/2 (20 overs)	v	Punjab Kings; 265/4 (18.5 overs)
KL Rahul 152* (67); Arshdeep Singh 1/49 (4 overs)		Prabhsimran Singh 76 (26); Kuldeep Yadav 2/46 (4 overs)

Punjab Kings won by 6 wickets
Arun Jaitley Stadium, Delhi
Umpires: Ajitesh Argal (Ind) and Virender Sharma (Ind)
Player of the match: KL Rahul (Delhi Capitals)

- Delhi Capitals won the toss and elected to bat.
- KL Rahul (Delhi Capitals) scored the highest individual score by an Indian player in the history of IPL.

Match 39
27 April 2026
19:30 (N)
Scorecard

Delhi Capitals (H); 75 (16.3 overs)	v	Royal Challengers Bengaluru; 77/1 (6.3 overs)
Abishek Porel 30 (33); Josh Hazlewood 4/12 (3.3 overs)		Devdutt Padikkal 34* (13); Kyle Jamieson 1/42 (3 overs)

Royal Challengers Bengaluru won by 9 wickets
Arun Jaitley Stadium, Delhi
Umpires: Ajitesh Argal (Ind) and Sam Nogajski (Aus)
Player of the match: Josh Hazlewood (Royal Challengers Bengaluru)

- Royal Challengers Bengaluru won the toss and elected to field.
- Virat Kohli (Royal Challengers Bengaluru) scored his 9,000th run in IPL.
- Sahil Parakh (Delhi Capitals) made his IPL debut.

Match 43
1 May 2026
19:30 (N)
Scorecard

Rajasthan Royals (H); 225/6 (20 overs)	v	Delhi Capitals; 226/3 (19.1 overs)
Riyan Parag 90 (50); Mitchell Starc 3/40 (4 overs)		KL Rahul 75 (40); Ravindra Jadeja 1/33 (3 overs)

Delhi Capitals won by 7 wickets
Sawai Mansingh Stadium, Jaipur
Umpires: Sam Nogajski (Aus) and Virender Sharma (Ind)
Player of the match: KL Rahul (Delhi Capitals)

- Rajasthan Royals won the toss and elected to bat.

Match 48
5 May 2026
19:30 (N)
Scorecard

Delhi Capitals (H); 155/7 (20 overs)	v	Chennai Super Kings; 159/2 (17.3 overs)
Sameer Rizvi 40* (24); Noor Ahmad 2/22 (3 overs)		Sanju Samson 87* (52); Axar Patel 1/25 (4 overs)

Chennai Super Kings won by 8 wickets
Arun Jaitley Stadium, Delhi
Umpires: Kaushik Gandhi (Ind) and Tanmay Srivastava (Ind)
Player of the match: Sanju Samson (Chennai Super Kings)

- Delhi Capitals won the toss and elected to bat.

Match 51
8 May 2026
19:30 (N)
Scorecard

Delhi Capitals (H); 142/8 (20 overs)	v	Kolkata Knight Riders; 147/2 (14.2 overs)
Pathum Nissanka 50 (29); Kartik Tyagi 2/25 (4 overs)		Finn Allen 100* (47); Axar Patel 1/27 (4 overs)

Kolkata Knight Riders won by 8 wickets
Arun Jaitley Stadium, Delhi
Umpires: Nitin Menon (Ind) and Rohan Pandit (Ind)
Player of the match: Finn Allen (Kolkata Knight Riders)

- Kolkata Knight Riders won the toss and elected to field.
- Finn Allen (Kolkata Knight Riders) scored his maiden century in IPL.

Match 55
11 May 2026
19:30 (N)
Scorecard

Punjab Kings (H); 210/5 (20 overs)	v	Delhi Capitals; 216/7 (19 overs)
Shreyas Iyer 59* (36); Madhav Tiwari 2/40 (4 overs)		Axar Patel 56 (30); Arshdeep Singh 2/21 (4 overs)

Delhi Capitals won by 3 wickets
HPCA Cricket Stadium, Dharamshala
Umpires: K. N. Ananthapadmanabhan (Ind) and Bhavesh Patel (Ind)
Player of the match: Madhav Tiwari (Delhi Capitals)

- Delhi Capitals won the toss and elected to field.
- Ben Dwarshuis (Punjab Kings) made his IPL debut.

Match 62
17 May 2026
19:30 (N)
Scorecard

Rajasthan Royals; 193/8 (20 overs)	v	Delhi Capitals (H); 197/5 (19.2 overs)
Dhruv Jurel 53 (40); Mitchell Starc 4/40 (4 overs)		KL Rahul 56 (42); Jofra Archer 2/35 (4 overs)

Delhi Capitals won by 5 wickets
Arun Jaitley Stadium, Delhi
Umpires: Amit Rana (Ind) and Keyur Kelkar (Ind)
Player of the match: Mitchell Starc (Delhi Capitals)

- Delhi Capitals won the toss and elected to field.
- Ravi Singh (Rajasthan Royals) and Tripurana Vijay (Delhi Capitals) both made their IPL debuts.

Match 70
24 May 2026
19:30 (N)
Scorecard

Delhi Capitals; 203/5 (20 overs)	v	Kolkata Knight Riders (H); 163 (18.4 overs)
KL Rahul 60 (30); Saurabh Dubey 2/28 (4 overs)		Ajinkya Rahane 63 (39); Lungi Ngidi 3/27 (3.4 overs)

Delhi Capitals won by 40 runs
Eden Gardens, Kolkata
Umpires: Saiyed Khalid (Ind) and Kannur Swaroopanand (Ind)
Player of the match: Kuldeep Yadav (Delhi Capitals)

- Kolkata Knight Riders won the toss and elected to field.

== Statistics ==
Most runs
Runs	Player
593	KL Rahul
278	Pathum Nissanka
275	Tristan Stubbs
252	Sameer Rizvi
225	Nitish Rana

Most wickets
Wickets	Player
13	Lungi Ngidi
11	Axar Patel
11	Mitchell Starc
10	Kuldeep Yadav
6	Mukesh Kumar
