= 2013 Kolkata Knight Riders season =

Indian Premier League cricket team season

Kolkata Knight Riders
2013 season
- Coach: Trevor Bayliss
- Captain: Gautam Gambhir
- Ground(s): Eden Gardens, Kolkata
- IPL: 7th
- Most runs: Gautam Gambhir (406)
- Most wickets: Sunil Narine (22)

Kolkata Knight Riders (KKR) is a franchise cricket team based in Kolkata, India, which plays in the Indian Premier League (IPL). They were one of the nine teams that competed in the 2013 IPL. They were captained by Gautam Gambhir. Kolkata Knight Riders finished 7th in the IPL and did not qualify for the Champions League T20.

== Background ==
KKR were the defending champions but they had a disappointing IPL season in 2013, as they failed to make the play-offs, losing ten and winning only six out of their sixteen matches. Although the overall performance was disappointing, a few individual performances gained attention, like Sunil Narine who took 22 wickets in 16 matches and Gautam Gambhir who made some good runs. But due to lack of rhythm and perfect combination of players, and bad form of a few players, the KKR could not win a few easy matches and ended up 6/10.

== Squad ==
- Players with international caps prior to the 2013 season are listed in **bold**.

No.	Name	Nationality	Birth date	Batting Style	Bowling Style	Notes
Batters
05	**Gautam Gambhir**	India	14 October 1981 (aged 31)	Left-handed	Right-arm leg break	Captain
07	Paras Dogra	India	19 November 1984 (aged 28)	Right-handed	Right-arm leg break	
09	**Manoj Tiwary**	India	14 November 1985 (aged 27)	Right-handed	Right-arm leg break	
16	**Eoin Morgan**	England	10 September 1986 (aged 26)	Left-handed	Right-arm medium	Overseas
63	Debabrata Das	India	22 September 1986 (aged 26)	Right-handed	Right-arm leg break	
All-rounders
03	**Jacques Kallis**	South Africa	16 October 1975 (aged 37)	Right-handed	Right-arm medium-fast	Vice-captain, Overseas
06	**Laxmi Ratan Shukla**	India	6 May 1981 (aged 31)	Right-handed	Right-arm medium	
22	Rajat Bhatia	India	22 October 1979 (aged 33)	Right-handed	Right-arm medium-fast	
23	**Ryan McLaren**	South Africa	9 February 1983 (aged 30)	Left-handed	Right-arm medium-fast	Overseas
27	**Ryan ten Doeschate**	Netherlands	30 June 1980 (aged 32)	Right-handed	Right arm medium-fast	Overseas
75	**Shakib Al Hasan**	Bangladesh	24 March 1987 (aged 26)	Left-handed	Slow left arm orthodox	Overseas
999	**Yusuf Pathan**	India	17 November 1982 (aged 30)	Right-handed	Right-arm off break	
–	Sumit Narwal	India	16 April 1982 (aged 30)	Left-handed	Right-arm medium-fast	
Wicket-keepers
24	**Brad Haddin**	Australia	23 October 1977 (aged 35)	Right-handed	–	Overseas
36	Manvinder Bisla	India	28 December 1984 (aged 28)	Right-handed	–	
42	**Brendon McCullum**	New Zealand	27 September 1981 (aged 31)	Right-handed	Right-arm medium	Overseas
Bowlers
01	Sarabjit Ladda	India	10 July 1986 (aged 26)	Right-handed	Right-arm leg break	
04	**James Pattinson**	Australia	3 May 1990 (aged 22)	Left-handed	Right-arm fast-medium	Overseas
08	Pradeep Sangwan	India	5 November 1990 (aged 22)	Right-handed	Left-arm medium-fast	
14	**Shami Ahmed**	India	9 March 1990 (aged 23)	Right-handed	Right-arm medium-fast	
18	**Sachithra Senanayake**	Sri Lanka	9 February 1985 (aged 28)	Right-handed	Right-arm off break	Overseas
21	Iqbal Abdulla	India	2 December 1989 (aged 23)	Left-handed	Slow left arm orthodox	
55	**Lakshmipathy Balaji**	India	27 September 1981 (aged 31)	Right-handed	Right arm medium-fast	
58	**Brett Lee**	Australia	8 November 1976 (aged 36)	Right-handed	Right-arm fast	Overseas
74	**Sunil Narine**	West Indies	26 May 1988 (aged 24)	Left-handed	Right-arm off break	Overseas

== Indian Premier League ==
=== Season standings ===
Kolkata Knight Riders finished 7th in the league stage of IPL 2013.

Pos	Team	Pld	W	L	NR	Pts	NRR
1	Chennai Super Kings (R)	16	11	5	0	22	0.530
2	Mumbai Indians (C)	16	11	5	0	22	0.441
3	Rajasthan Royals (3rd)	16	10	6	0	20	0.322
4	Sunrisers Hyderabad (4th)	16	10	6	0	20	0.003
5	Royal Challengers Bangalore	16	9	7	0	18	0.457
6	Kings XI Punjab	16	8	8	0	16	0.226
7	Kolkata Knight Riders	16	6	10	0	12	−0.095
8	Pune Warriors India	16	4	12	0	8	−1.006
9	Delhi Daredevils	16	3	13	0	6	−0.848

"C" refers to the champions of the tournament, R to the runners-up.

=== Match log ===
No.	Date	Opponent	Venue	Result	Scorecard
1	April 3, 2013	Delhi Daredevils	Kolkata	Won by 6 wickets, MoM - Sunil Narine 4/13	
2	April 8, 2013	Rajasthan Royals	Jaipur	Lost by 19 runs	
3	April 11, 2013	Royal Challengers Bangalore	Bengaluru	Lost by 8 wickets	
4	April 14, 2013	Sunrisers Hyderabad	Kolkata	Won by 48 runs, MoM – Gautam Gambhir 53(45)	Score Card
5	April 16, 2013	Kings XI Punjab	Mohali	Lost by 4 runs	
6	April 20, 2013	Chennai Super Kings	Kolkata	Lost by 4 wickets	
7	April 24, 2013	Mumbai Indians	Kolkata	Lost by 5 wickets	
8	April 26, 2013	Kings XI Punjab	Kolkata	Won by 6 wickets, MoM – Jacques Kallis 2/14 (4 overs) and 44	
9	April 28, 2013	Chennai Super Kings	Chennai	Lost by 14 runs	
10	May 1, 2013	Delhi Daredevils	Raipur	Lost by 7 wickets	
11	May 3, 2013	Rajasthan Royals	Kolkata	Won by 8 wickets; MoM – Yusuf Pathan 49* (35)	
12	May 7, 2013	Mumbai Indians	Mumbai	Lost by 65 runs	
13	May 9, 2013	Pune Warriors India	Pune	Won By 46 runs; MoM – Gautam Gambhir 50(44)	
14	May 12, 2013	Royal Challengers Bangalore	Ranchi	Won By 5 wickets; MoM – Jacques Kallis 2/17 (4 overs) and 41(45)	
15	May 14, 2013	Pune Warriors India	Ranchi	Lost by 7 runs	
16	May 19, 2013	Sunrisers Hyderabad	Hyderabad	Lost by 5 wickets	
Overall record: 6–10. Failed to advance.
