= 2013 Rajasthan Royals season =

Indian Premier League cricket team season

Rajasthan Royals
2013 season
- Coach: Paddy Upton
- Captain: Rahul Dravid
- Ground(s): Sawai Mansingh Stadium, Jaipur
- IPL: 3rd
- CLT20: Runners up
- Most runs: Shane Watson (543)
- Most wickets: James Faulkner (28)

Rajasthan Royals (RR) is a franchise cricket team based in Jaipur, India, which plays in the Indian Premier League (IPL). They were one of the nine teams that competed in the 2013 Indian Premier League. They were captained by Rahul Dravid. Rajasthan Royals finished 3rd in the IPL.

== Squad ==
- Players with international caps prior to the 2013 season are listed in **bold**.

No.	Name	Nat	Birth date	Batting Style	Bowling Style	Notes
Batsmen
01	Ashok Menaria	(India)	29 October 1990 (aged 22)	Left-handed	Slow left arm orthodox	
03	**Ajinkya Rahane**	(India)	5 June 1988 (aged 24)	Right-handed	Right-arm medium	
07	**Brad Hodge**	(Australia)	29 December 1974 (aged 38)	Right-handed	Right-arm off break	Overseas
19	**Rahul Dravid**	(India)	11 January 1973 (aged 40)	Right-handed	Right-arm off break	Captain
27	Sachin Baby	(India)	18 December 1988 (aged 24)	Left-handed	Right-arm off break	
99	**Owais Shah**	(England)	22 October 1978 (aged 34)	Right-handed	Right-arm off break	Overseas
All-rounders
33	**Shane Watson**	(Australia)	17 June 1981 (aged 31)	Right-handed	Right-arm fast-medium	Vice-captain
44	**James Faulkner**	(Australia)	29 April 1990 (aged 22)	Right-handed	Left-arm medium-fast	Overseas
84	Stuart Binny	(India)	3 June 1984 (aged 28)	Right-handed	Right-arm medium	
90	Kevon Cooper	(Trinidad and Tobago)	2 February 1989 (aged 24)	Right-handed	Right-arm medium-fast	Overseas
	Kumar Boresa	(India)	25 August 1995 (aged 17)	Right-handed	Slow left arm orthodox	
Wicket-keepers
08	**Kusal Perera**	(Sri Lanka)	17 August 1990 (aged 22)	Left-handed	–	Overseas
09	Sanju Samson	(India)	11 November 1994 (aged 18)	Right-handed	–	
63	Shreevats Goswami	(India)	18 May 1989 (aged 23)	Left-handed	–	
77	Dishant Yagnik	(India)	22 June 1983 (aged 29)	Left-handed	–	
Bowlers
02	Pravin Tambe	(India)	8 October 1971 (aged 41)	Right-handed	Right-arm leg break	
05	Vikramjeet Malik	(India)	9 May 1983 (aged 29)	Right-handed	Right-arm medium-fast	
06	Rahul Shukla	(India)	28 August 1990 (aged 22)	Right-handed	Right-arm fast-medium	
11	Ajit Chandila	(India)	5 December 1983 (aged 29)	Right-handed	Right-arm off break	
20	**Fidel Edwards**	(Barbados)	6 February 1982 (aged 31)	Right-handed	Right-arm fast	Overseas
28	Ankeet Chavan	(India)	28 October 1985 (aged 27)	Left-handed	Slow left arm orthodox	
31	**Brad Hogg**	(Australia)	6 February 1971 (aged 42)	Left-handed	Left-arm chinaman	Overseas
32	**Shaun Tait**	(Australia)	22 February 1983 (aged 30)	Right-handed	Right-arm fast	Overseas
36	**Sreesanth**	(India)	6 February 1983 (aged 30)	Right-handed	Right-arm fast-medium	
79	**Samuel Badree**	(Trinidad and Tobago)	9 March 1981 (aged 32)	Right-handed	Right-arm leg break	Overseas
37	Siddharth Trivedi	(India)	4 September 1982 (aged 30)	Right-handed	Right-arm medium-fast	
70	Harmeet Singh	(India)	7 September 1992 (aged 20)	Left-handed	Slow left arm orthodox	

== IPL ==
=== Standings ===
Rajasthan Royals finished 3rd in the league stage of IPL 2013.

Pos	Team	Pld	W	L	NR	Pts	NRR
1	Chennai Super Kings (R)	16	11	5	0	22	0.530
2	Mumbai Indians (C)	16	11	5	0	22	0.441
3	Rajasthan Royals (3rd)	16	10	6	0	20	0.322
4	Sunrisers Hyderabad (4th)	16	10	6	0	20	0.003
5	Royal Challengers Bangalore	16	9	7	0	18	0.457
6	Kings XI Punjab	16	8	8	0	16	0.226
7	Kolkata Knight Riders	16	6	10	0	12	−0.095
8	Pune Warriors India	16	4	12	0	8	−1.006
9	Delhi Daredevils	16	3	13	0	6	−0.848

"C" refers to the champions of the tournament, R to the runners-up.

=== Match log ===
No.	Date	Opponent	Venue	Result	Man of the match	Scorecard
1	6 April 2013	Delhi Daredevils	New Delhi	Won by 5 runs	Rahul Dravid 65(51)	Scorecard
2	8 April 2013	Kolkata Knight Riders	Jaipur	Won by 19 runs	Siddharth Trivedi 4/23	Scorecard
3	11 April 2013	Pune Warriors India	Pune	Lost by 7 wickets		Scorecard
4	14 April 2013	Kings XI Punjab	Jaipur	Won by 6 wickets	James Faulkner 2/30	Scorecard
5	17 April 2013	Mumbai Indians	Jaipur	won by 87 runs	Ajinkya Rahane 68(54)	Scorecard
6	20 April 2013	Royal Challengers Bangalore	Bengaluru	Lost by 7 wickets		Scorecard
7	22 April 2013	Chennai Super Kings	Chennai	Lost by 5 wickets		Scorecard
8	27 April 2013	Sunrisers Hyderabad	Jaipur	Won by 8 wickets	James Faulkner 5/20(4 overs)	Scorecard
9	29 April 2013	Royal Challengers Bangalore	Jaipur	Won by 4 wickets	Sanju Samson 63 (31)	Scorecard
10	3 May 2013	Kolkata Knight Riders	Kolkata	Lost by 8 wickets		Scorecard
11	5 May 2013	Pune Warriors India	Jaipur	Won By 5 wickets	Ajinkya Rahane 67 (48)	Scorecard
12	7 May 2013	Delhi Daredevils	Jaipur	Won By 9 wickets	Ajinkya Rahane 63* (45)	Scorecard
13	9 May 2013	Kings XI Punjab	Mohali	Won By 8 wickets	Kevon Cooper 3–23	Scorecard
14	12 May 2013	Chennai Super Kings	Jaipur	Won By 5 wickets	Shane Watson 70 (34)	Scorecard
15	15 May 2013	Mumbai Indians	Mumbai	Lost by 14 runs		Scorecard
16	17 May 2013	Sunrisers Hyderabad	Hyderabad	Lost by 23 runs		Scorecard
17	22 May 2013	Sunrisers Hyderabad (Eliminator)	New Delhi	Won by 4 wickets	Brad Hodge 54* (29)	Scorecard
18	24 May 2013	Mumbai Indians (Qualifier 2)	Kolkata	Lost by 4 wickets		Scorecard

== Champions League T20 ==
=== Group stage standings ===
Team	Pld	W	L	NR	Pts	NRR
Rajasthan Royals	4	4	0	0	16	+0.960
Mumbai Indians	4	2	1	1	10	+1.068
Otago Volts	4	2	1	1	10	+0.869
Highveld Lions	4	0	3	1	2	–0.726
Perth Scorchers	4	0	3	1	2	–2.851

=== Match log ===
No.	Date	Opponent	Venue	Result	Man of the match	Scorecard
1	21 September 2013	Mumbai Indians	Jaipur	Won by 7 wickets	Vikramjeet Malik 3/24 (4 overs)	Scorecard
2	25 September 2013	Highveld Lions	Jaipur	Won by 30 runs	Pravin Tambe 4/15 (3 overs)	Scorecard
3	29 September 2013	Perth Scorchers	Jaipur	Won by 9 wickets	Kevon Cooper 4/18 (4 overs)	Scorecard
4	1 October 2013	Otago Volts	Jaipur	Won by 4 wickets	Rahul Shukla 3/23 (4 overs)	Scorecard
Semi-Final	4 October 2013	Chennai Super Kings	Jaipur	Won by 14 runs	Pravin Tambe 3/10 (4 overs)	Scorecard
Final	6 October 2013	Mumbai Indians	Feroz Shah Kotla	Lost by 33 runs		Scorecard
