= 2023 Delhi Capitals season =

Indian Premier League cricket season

Delhi Capitals
2023 season
- captain: David Warner

Delhi Capitals (abbreviated as DC) is a franchise cricket team based in Delhi, India, which plays in the Indian Premier League (IPL).

== Squad ==
The squad for the season was:

Name	Country	Batting style	Bowling style
David Warner	Australia	Left hand Bat	Legbreak
Abishek Porel	India	Left hand Bat	None (Wicketkeeper Batter)
Yash Dhull	India	Right hand Bat	Right arm Offbreak
Priyam Garg	India	Right hand Bat	Right arm Medium
Sarfaraz Khan	India	Right hand Bat	Legbreak
Manish Pandey	India	Right hand Bat	Right arm Medium
Ripal Patel	India	Right hand Bat	Right arm Medium fast
Rovman Powell	West Indies	Right hand Bat	Right arm Medium fast
Rilee Rossouw	South Africa	Left hand Bat	Right arm Offbreak
Phil Salt	England	Right hand Bat	Right arm Offbreak
Prithvi Shaw	India	Right hand Bat	Right arm Offbreak
Rishabh Pant	India	Left hand Bat	None (Wicketkeeper Batter)
Aman Khan	India	Right hand Bat	Right arm Medium
Lalit Yadav	India	Right hand Bat	Right arm Offbreak
Mitchell Marsh	Australia	Right hand Bat	Right arm Medium
Axar Patel	India	Left hand Bat	Slow Left arm Orthodox
Khaleel Ahmed	India	Right hand Bat	Left arm Fast medium
Praveen Dubey	India	Right hand Bat	Legbreak Googly
Kuldeep Yadav	India	Left hand Bat	Left arm Wrist spin
Mukesh Kumar	India	Right hand Bat	Right arm Medium
Mustafizur Rahman	Bangladesh	Left hand Bat	Left arm Fast medium
Lungi Ngidi	South Africa	Right hand Bat	Right arm Fast medium
Anrich Nortje	South Africa	Right hand Bat	Right arm Fast
Vicky Ostwal	India	Right hand Bat	Slow Left arm Orthodox
Chetan Sakariya	India	Left hand Bat	Left arm Medium fast
Ishant Sharma	India	Right hand Bat	Right arm Fast medium
Kamlesh Nagarkoti	India	Right hand Bat	Right arm Fast

== Indian Premier League ==
On 1 April, the Delhi Capitals started their 2023 campaign with a loss at the hands of the Lucknow Super Giants at Ekana. Batting first, the Super Giants registered a total of 193 runs for the loss of six wickets, with debutant Kyle Mayers scoring 73 runs in just 38 balls. Nicholas Pooran and Ayush Bodoni also contributed to the score with explosive knocks toward the end of the innings. At the end of his bowling spell, Delhi's Khaleel Ahmed was replaced with impact player Aman Khan. In the second innings, Mark Wood achieved a five-wicket haul, as the Delhi batters collapsed with the exception of skipper David Warner, who managed a slow half-century. The innings ended with a final score of 143 for 9 wickets, falling short of the target by 50 runs.

The Capitals suffered another defeat in their second game, on 4 April, this time by defending champions Gujarat Lions. Playing at their home ground of Feroz Shah Kotla, the Delhi batters managed to score 52 runs in the powerplay, losing only two wickets. However, Gujarat's bowling attack, consisting of Mohammed Shami and Rashid Khan, both of whom achieved three-wicket hauls, as well as Alzarri Joseph, who took two wickets in two balls, restricted the Delhi batters to 162 for 8 at the end of their innings. The Lions' batsmen chased this total comfortably, with Sai Sudharsan's knock of 62 earning him the player of the match award. The match ended with 11 balls remaining.

Delhi's troubles continued into their third match, held on 8 April in Guwahati, where they were handed a 57-run defeat by the Rajasthan Royals. Batting first, the Royals set a score of 199 for the loss of four wickets, thanks to Jos Buttler and Yashasvi Jaiswal, with explosive knocks of 79 and 60 runs respectively. Jaiswal set the tone with five fours in the first over, while Buttler capitalized on early chances to anchor the innings. The Capitals' chase faltered immediately, as Trent Boult dismissed Prithvi Shaw and Manish Pandey in the first over, leaving Delhi reeling at 0/2. Boult and Yuzvendra Chahal led the Royals' bowling attack, both registering three-wicket hauls, while David Warner's labored 65 from 55 balls was the only resistance from the Capitals, who ended the innings registering 142 for the loss of 9 wickets.

On 8 April, they lost to Rajasthan Royals.

On 11 April, they lost to the Mumbai Indians.

On 15 April, they lost to the Royal Challengers Bangalore in their fifth straight defeat.

They registered their first win against the Kolkata Knight Riders on 20 April.

On 24 April, they recorded their second win against the Sunrisers Hyderabad. The Capitals, batting first, registered 144 runs for the loss of 9 wickets. The Sunrisers could only manage 136 runs for the loss of 7 wickets at the end of their innings.

On 29 April, they were defeated by the Sunrisers Hyderabad.

On 6 May, they won against the Royal Challengers.

On 10 May, they lost to the Chennai Super Kings.

On 17 May, they won against the Punjab Kings by 15 runs, after registering a score of 213-2 in the first innings, with Rilee Rossouw making 82 runs off of 37 balls. The Punjab Kings were unable to chase the total, ending their innings with 198 runs for the loss of 8 wickets.

They played their final game against the Chennai Super Kings. DC had no chance to qualify for the playoffs. Chennai defeated the Delhi Capitals by 77 runs.
