= 2013 Royal Challengers Bangalore season =

Indian Premier League cricket team season

Royal Challengers Bangalore
2013 season
- Coach: Ray Jennings
- Captain: Virat Kohli
- Ground(s): M. Chinnaswamy Stadium, Bangalore
- League stage: 5th
- Most runs: Chris Gayle (708)
- Most wickets: Vinay Kumar (23)

Royal Challengers Bangalore is a franchise cricket team based in Bangalore, India, which plays in the Indian Premier League. They were one of the nine teams that competed in the 2013 Indian Premier League. They were captained by Virat Kohli. Royal Challengers Bangalore finished fifth in the IPL and did not qualify for the Champions League T20.

== Squad ==
- Players with international caps before the 2013 IPL season are listed in **bold**.

No.	Name	Nationality	Birth date	Batting Style	Bowling Style	Notes
Batsmen
03	**Cheteshwar Pujara**	India	25 January 1988 (aged 25)	Right-handed	Right-arm leg break	
15	Karun Nair	India	6 December 1991 (aged 21)	Right-handed	Right-arm off break	
18	**Virat Kohli**	India	5 November 1988 (aged 24)	Right-handed	Right-arm medium	Captain
23	**Tillakaratne Dilshan**	Sri Lanka	14 October 1976 (aged 36)	Right-handed	Right-arm off break	Overseas
32	**Saurabh Tiwary**	India	30 December 1989 (aged 23)	Left-handed	Right-arm off break	
64	Sunny Sohal	India	10 November 1987 (aged 25)	Right-handed	Right-arm leg break	
90	**Abhinav Mukund**	India	6 January 1990 (aged 23)	Left-handed	Right-arm leg break	
99	Mayank Agarwal	India	16 February 1991 (aged 22)	Right-handed	–	
175	**Chris Gayle**	Jamaica	21 September 1979 (aged 33)	Left-handed	Right-arm off break	Overseas
–	Vijay Zol	India	23 November 1994 (aged 18)	Left-handed	Right-arm off break	
All-rounders
04	**Andrew McDonald**	Australia	15 June 1981 (aged 31)	Right-handed	Right-arm medium-fast	Overseas
07	**Moisés Henriques**	Australia	1 February 1987 (aged 26)	Right-handed	Right-arm medium-fast	Overseas
11	**Daniel Vettori**	New Zealand	27 January 1979 (aged 34)	Left-handed	Slow left arm orthodox	Overseas
45	**Daniel Christian**	Australia	4 May 1983 (aged 29)	Right-handed	Right-arm medium-fast	Overseas
–	**Christopher Barnwell**	Guyana	6 January 1987 (aged 26)	Right-handed	Right-arm medium-fast	Overseas
Wicket-keepers
02	KL Rahul	India	18 April 1992 (aged 20)	Right-handed	-	
17	**AB de Villiers**	South Africa	17 February 1984 (aged 29)	Right-handed	Right-arm medium	Overseas
21	Arun Karthik	India	15 February 1986 (aged 27)	Right-handed	Right-arm leg break	
–	Sheldon Jackson	India	27 September 1986 (aged 26)	Right-handed	-	
Bowlers
01	Harshal Patel	India	23 November 1990 (aged 22)	Right-handed	Right-arm medium-fast	
03	KP Appanna	India	20 December 1988 (aged 24)	Right-handed	Slow left arm orthodox	
05	**Vinay Kumar**	India	12 February 1984 (aged 29)	Right-handed	Right-arm medium-fast	
08	Syed Mohammed	India	3 June 1983 (aged 29)	Left-handed	Slow left arm orthodox	
09	**R. P. Singh**	India	6 December 1985 (aged 27)	Right-handed	Left-arm fast-medium	
14	**Ravi Rampaul**	Trinidad and Tobago	15 October 1984 (aged 28)	Left-handed	Right-arm fast-medium	Overseas
20	Prasanth Parameswaran	India	30 May 1985 (aged 27)	Left-handed	Left-arm medium-fast	
25	**Abhimanyu Mithun**	India	25 October 1989 (aged 23)	Right-handed	Right arm medium-fast	
34	**Zaheer Khan**	India	7 October 1978 (aged 34)	Right-handed	Left-arm fast-medium	
77	**Jaydev Unadkat**	India	18 October 1991 (aged 21)	Right-handed	Left-arm fast-medium	
79	Sreenath Aravind	India	8 April 1984 (aged 28)	Left-handed	Left-arm medium-fast	Unavailable for the entire season
222	**Murali Kartik**	India	11 September 1976 (aged 36)	Left-handed	Slow left arm orthodox	
800	**Muttiah Muralitharan**	Sri Lanka	17 April 1972 (aged 40)	Right-handed	Right-arm off break	Overseas
–	Sandeep Warrier	India	4 April 1991 (aged 21)	Right-handed	Right-arm fast-medium	
–	**Pankaj Singh**	India	6 May 1985 (aged 27)	Right-handed	Right-arm fast-medium	

== Standings ==
Royal Challengers Bangalore finished fifth in the league stage of IPL 2013.

Pos	Team	Pld	W	L	NR	Pts	NRR
1	Chennai Super Kings (R)	16	11	5	0	22	0.530
2	Mumbai Indians (C)	16	11	5	0	22	0.441
3	Rajasthan Royals (3rd)	16	10	6	0	20	0.322
4	Sunrisers Hyderabad (4th)	16	10	6	0	20	0.003
5	Royal Challengers Bangalore	16	9	7	0	18	0.457
6	Kings XI Punjab	16	8	8	0	16	0.226
7	Kolkata Knight Riders	16	6	10	0	12	−0.095
8	Pune Warriors India	16	4	12	0	8	−1.006
9	Delhi Daredevils	16	3	13	0	6	−0.848

"C" refers to the champions of the tournament, R to the runners-up.

== Results ==
No.	Date	Opponent	Venue	Result	Scorecard
1	4 April 2013	Mumbai Indians	Bengaluru	Won by 2 runs, MoM – Chris Gayle 92* (58)	Scorecard
2	7 April 2013	Sunrisers Hyderabad	Hyderabad	Match tied. Lost the super over by 5 runs	Scorecard
3	9 April 2013	Sunrisers Hyderabad	Bengaluru	Won by 7 wickets, MoM – Virat Kohli 93* (47)	Scorecard
4	11 April 2013	Kolkata Knight Riders	Bengaluru	Won by 8 wickets, MoM – Chris Gayle 85* (50)	Scorecard
5	13 April 2013	Chennai Super Kings	Chennai	Lost by 4 wickets	Scorecard
6	16 April 2013	Delhi Daredevils	Bengaluru	Match tied. Won the super over by 4 runs, MoM – Virat Kohli 65 (50)	Scorecard
7	20 April 2013	Rajasthan Royals	Bengaluru	Won by 7 wickets, MoM – Vinay Kumar 3/18 (4 overs)	Scorecard
8	23 April 2013	Pune Warriors India	Bengaluru	Won by 130 runs, MoM – Chris Gayle 175* (66) and 2/5 (1 over)	Scorecard
9	27 April 2013	Mumbai Indians	Mumbai	Lost by 58 Runs	Scorecard
10	29 April 2013	Rajasthan Royals	Jaipur	Lost by 4 wickets	Scorecard
11	2 May 2013	Pune Warriors India	Pune	Won by 17 runs, MoM – AB de Villiers 50* (23)	Scorecard
12	6 May 2013	Kings XI Punjab	Mohali	Lost by 6 wickets	Scorecard
13	10 May 2013	Delhi Daredevils	New Delhi	Won by 4 runs, MoM – Jaydev Unadkat 5/25 (4 overs)	Scorecard
14	12 May 2013	Kolkata Knight Riders	Ranchi	Lost by 5 wickets	Scorecard
15	14 May 2013	Kings XI Punjab	Bengaluru	Lost by 7 wickets	Scorecard
16	18 May 2013	Chennai Super Kings	Bengaluru	Won by 24 runs, MoM – Virat Kohli 56* (29)	Scorecard
Overall record: 9–7. Failed to advance.
