= 2024 Delhi Capitals season =

2024 Indian Premier League cricket team

Delhi Capitals
2024 season
- Coach: Ricky Ponting
- Captain: Rishabh Pant; Axar Patel (stand-in) (Note: Axar Patel was the stand-in captain for Match 62 after Rishabh Pant was suspended.)
- Ground(s): Arun Jaitley Stadium, Delhi; ACA–VDCA Cricket Stadium, Visakhapatnam
- IPL League: Finished at 6th place
- Most runs: Rishabh Pant (446)
- Most wickets: Mukesh Kumar (17)
- Most catches: Axar Patel (13)
- Most wicket-keeping dismissals: Rishabh Pant (16)

The 2024 season was the 17th season for the Indian Premier League franchise Delhi Capitals. They were one of the ten teams competed in the 2024 Indian Premier League. They finished at the 9th place in previous season's League stage. The Delhi Capitals drew an average home attendance of 33,580 in the IPL in 2024.

Ahead of the 2024 season, Rishabh Pant returned as the captain after missing out the 2023 season due to injury. After Hyderabad's abandoned match on 16 May 2024, Delhi was eliminated from the 2024 Indian Premier League. They finished the League stage at the 6th place with 7 wins and 7 losses, garnering 14 points.

At the end of the season, Jake Fraser-McGurk was named as the "Electric Striker of the season" and was awarded with ₹10 lakh (US$13,000) cash prize along with a trophy and a car.

== Squad ==
- Players with international caps are listed in **bold**
- Ages are as of 22 March 2024, the date of the first match in the competition

Squad for the 2024 Indian Premier League
| No. | Name | Nationality | Birth date | Batting style | Bowling style | Year signed | Salary | Notes |
Captain
| 17 | **Rishabh Pant** | India | 4 October 1997 (aged 26) | Left-handed | – | 2016 | ₹16 crore (US$1.7 million) | Wicket-keeper; Suspended (Note: Rishabh Pant was suspended for Match 62 due to slow over-rate.) |
| 20 | **Axar Patel** | India | 20 January 1994 (aged 30) | Left-handed | Left-arm orthodox | 2019 | ₹9 crore (US$960,000) | Vice Captain |
Batters
| 22 | Yash Dhull | India | 11 November 2002 (aged 21) | Right-handed | Right-arm off break | 2022 | ₹50 lakh (US$53,000) | |
| 31 | **David Warner** | Australia | 27 October 1986 (aged 37) | Left-handed | Right-arm leg break | 2022 | ₹6.25 crore (US$670,000) | Overseas |
| 100 | **Prithvi Shaw** | India | 9 November 1999 (aged 24) | Right-handed | Right-arm off break | 2018 | ₹7.5 crore (US$800,000) | |
| 88 | **Harry Brook** | England | 22 February 1999 (aged 25) | Right-handed | Right-arm medium | 2024 | ₹4 crore (US$430,000) | Overseas; Withdrew (Note: Lizaad Williams replaced Harry Brook, after the latter withdrew due to Personal reasons.) |
| 99 | Swastik Chikara | India | 3 April 2005 (aged 18) | Right-handed | Right-arm off break | 2024 | ₹20 lakh (US$21,000) | |
Wicket-keepers
| 24 | Abishek Porel | India | 17 October 2002 (aged 21) | Left-handed | – | 2023 | ₹75 lakh (US$80,000) | |
| 4 | **Shai Hope** | West Indies | 10 November 1993 (aged 30) | Right-handed | – | 2024 | ₹75 lakh (US$80,000) | Overseas |
| 30 | **Tristan Stubbs** | South Africa | 14 August 2000 (aged 23) | Right-handed | – | 2024 | ₹50 lakh (US$53,000) | Overseas |
| 3 | Kumar Kushagra | India | 23 October 2004 (aged 19) | Right-handed | – | 2024 | ₹7.80 crore (US$830,000) | |
| 5 | Ricky Bhui | India | 29 September 1996 (aged 27) | Right-handed | Leg-break googly | 2024 | ₹20 lakh (US$21,000) | Occasional |
All-rounders
| 8 | **Mitchell Marsh** | Australia | 20 October 1991 (aged 32) | Right-handed | Right-arm medium | 2022 | ₹6 crore (US$640,000) | Overseas; Withdrew (Note: Gulbadin Naib replaced Mitchell Marsh, after the latter withdrew due to Injury.) |
| 16 | Lalit Yadav | India | 3 January 1997 (aged 27) | Right-handed | Right-arm off break | 2022 | ₹65 lakh (US$69,000) | |
| 33 | **Jake Fraser-McGurk** | Australia | 11 April 2002 (aged 21) | Right-handed | Right-arm leg spin | 2024 | ₹50 lakh (US$53,000) | Overseas; Replacement (Note: Jake Fraser-McGurk replaced Lungi Ngidi, after the latter withdrew due to Lower back injury.) |
| 12 | Sumit Kumar | India | 12 December 1995 (aged 28) | Right-handed | Right-arm fast-medium | 2024 | ₹1 crore (US$110,000) | |
| 14 | **Gulbadin Naib** | Afghanistan | 4 June 1991 (aged 32) | Right-handed | Right-arm fast medium | 2024 | ₹50 lakh (US$53,000) | Overseas; Replacement |
Pace bowlers
| 02 | **Anrich Nortje** | South Africa | 16 November 1993 (aged 30) | Right-handed | Right-arm fast | 2020 | ₹6.5 crore (US$690,000) | Overseas |
| 29 | **Ishant Sharma** | India | 2 September 1988 (aged 35) | Right-handed | Right-arm fast-medium | 2023 | ₹50 lakh (US$53,000) | |
| 49 | **Mukesh Kumar** | India | 12 October 1993 (aged 30) | Right-handed | Right-arm medium | 2023 | ₹5.5 crore (US$590,000) | |
| 71 | **Khaleel Ahmed** | India | 5 December 1997 (aged 26) | Right-handed | Left-arm medium | 2022 | ₹5.25 crore (US$560,000) | |
| 22 | **Lungi Ngidi** | South Africa | 29 March 1996 (aged 27) | Right-handed | Right-arm fast-medium | 2022 | ₹50 lakh (US$53,000) | Overseas; Withdrew |
| 60 | **Jhye Richardson** | Australia | 20 September 1996 (aged 27) | Right-handed | Right-arm fast | 2024 | ₹5 crore (US$530,000) | Overseas |
| 44 | Rasikh Salam Dar | India | 5 April 2000 (aged 23) | Right-handed | Right-arm fast-medium | 2024 | ₹20 lakh (US$21,000) | |
| 6 | **Lizaad Williams** | South Africa | 1 October 1993 (aged 30) | Left-handed | Right-arm fast-medium | 2024 | ₹50 lakh (US$53,000) | Overseas; Replacement |
Spin bowlers
| 23 | **Kuldeep Yadav** | India | 14 December 1994 (aged 29) | Left-handed | Left-arm unorthodox | 2022 | ₹2 crore (US$210,000) | |
| 46 | Praveen Dubey | India | 1 July 1993 (aged 30) | Right-handed | Right-arm leg spin | 2020 | ₹50 lakh (US$53,000) | |
| – | Vicky Ostwal | India | 1 September 2002 (aged 21) | Left-handed | Left-arm orthodox | 2022 | ₹20 lakh (US$21,000) | |

- Source: ESPNcricinfo

== Administration and support staff ==
| Position | Name |
|---|---|
| CEO | Parth Jindal |
| Team manager | Siddharth Bhasin |
| Head coach | Ricky Ponting |
| Batting coach | Pravin Amre |
| Bowling coach | James Hopes |
| Fielding coach | Biju George |

== League stage ==
=== Points table ===
| Pos | Grp | Team | Pld | W | L | NR | Pts | NRR | Qualification |
|---|---|---|---|---|---|---|---|---|---|
| 1 | A | Kolkata Knight Riders (C) | 14 | 9 | 3 | 2 | 20 | 1.428 | Advanced to Qualifier 1 |
| 2 | B | Sunrisers Hyderabad (R) | 14 | 8 | 5 | 1 | 17 | 0.414 | Advanced to Qualifier 1 |
| 3 | A | Rajasthan Royals (3rd) | 14 | 8 | 5 | 1 | 17 | 0.273 | Advanced to Eliminator |
| 4 | B | Royal Challengers Bengaluru (4th) | 14 | 7 | 7 | 0 | 14 | 0.459 | Advanced to Eliminator |
| 5 | B | Chennai Super Kings | 14 | 7 | 7 | 0 | 14 | 0.392 | Eliminated |
| 6 | A | Delhi Capitals | 14 | 7 | 7 | 0 | 14 | −0.377 | Eliminated |
| 7 | A | Lucknow Super Giants | 14 | 7 | 7 | 0 | 14 | −0.667 | Eliminated |
| 8 | B | Gujarat Titans | 14 | 5 | 7 | 2 | 12 | −1.063 | Eliminated |
| 9 | B | Punjab Kings | 14 | 5 | 9 | 0 | 10 | −0.353 | Eliminated |
| 10 | A | Mumbai Indians | 14 | 4 | 10 | 0 | 8 | −0.318 | Eliminated |

Source: ESPNcricinfo
(C) Champions; (R) Runners-up

=== League progression ===
League progression
| Team | Group matches | | | | | | | | | | | | | | Playoffs | | |
| Team | 1 | 2 | 3 | 4 | 5 | 6 | 7 | 8 | 9 | 10 | 11 | 12 | 13 | 14 | Q1/E | Q2 | F |
|---|---|---|---|---|---|---|---|---|---|---|---|---|---|---|---|---|---|
| Delhi Capitals | 0 | 0 | 2 | 2 | 2 | 4 | 6 | 6 | 8 | 10 | 10 | 12 | 12 | 14 | | | |

| Win | Loss | No result |

- Note: The total points at the end of each group match are listed.
- Note: Click on the points (group matches) or W/L (playoffs) to see the match summary.

=== Fixtures and results ===
Match 2
23 March 2024
15:30 (D/N)
Scorecard

| Delhi Capitals; 174/9 (20 overs) | v | Punjab Kings (H); 177/6 (19.2 overs) |
| Shai Hope 33 (25); Arshdeep Singh 2/28 (4 overs) | | Sam Curran 63 (47); Kuldeep Yadav 2/20 (4 overs) |

Punjab Kings won by 4 wickets
Maharaja Yadavindra Singh International Cricket Stadium, Mullanpur
Umpires: Jayaraman Madanagopal (Ind) and Nikhil Patwardhan (Ind)
Player of the match: Sam Curran (Punjab Kings)

- Punjab Kings won the toss and elected to field.
- This was the first IPL match played at this venue.

Match 9
28 March 2024
19:30 (N)
Scorecard

| (H) Rajasthan Royals; 185/5 (20 overs) | v | Delhi Capitals; 173/5 (20 overs) |
| Riyan Parag 84* (45); Axar Patel 1/21 (4 overs) | | David Warner 49 (34); Yuzvendra Chahal 2/19 (3 overs) |

Rajasthan Royals won by 12 runs
Sawai Mansingh Stadium, Jaipur
Umpires: Nand Kishore (Ind) and Nitin Menon (Ind)
Player of the match: Riyan Parag (Rajasthan Royals)

- Delhi Capitals won the toss and elected to field.

Match 13
31 March 2024
19:30 (N)
Scorecard

| (H) Delhi Capitals; 191/5 (20 overs) | v | Chennai Super Kings; 171/6 (20 overs) |
| David Warner 52 (35); Matheesha Pathirana 3/31 (4 overs) | | Ajinkya Rahane 45 (30); Mukesh Kumar 3/21 (3 overs) |

Delhi Capitals won by 20 runs
ACA-VDCA Cricket Stadium, Visakhapatnam
Umpires: Kumar Dharmasena (SL) and Vinod Seshan (Ind)
Player of the match: Khaleel Ahmed (Delhi Capitals)

- Delhi Capitals won the toss and elected to bat.

Match 16
3 April 2024
19:30 (N)
Scorecard

| Kolkata Knight Riders; 272/7 (20 overs) | v | Delhi Capitals (H); 166 (17.2 overs) |
| Sunil Narine 85 (39); Anrich Nortje 3/59 (4 overs) | | Rishabh Pant 55 (25); Vaibhav Arora 3/27 (4 overs) |

Kolkata Knight Riders won by 106 runs
ACA-VDCA Cricket Stadium, Visakhapatnam
Umpires: Ulhas Gandhe (Ind) and Akshay Totre (Ind)
Player of the match: Sunil Narine (Kolkata Knight Riders)

- Kolkata Knight Riders won the toss and elected to bat.

Match 20
7 April 2024
15:30 (D/N)
Scorecard

| (H) Mumbai Indians; 234/5 (20 overs) | v | Delhi Capitals; 205/8 (20 overs) |
| Rohit Sharma 49 (27); Axar Patel 2/35 (4 overs) | | Tristan Stubbs 71* (25); Gerald Coetzee 4/34 (4 overs) |

Mumbai Indians won by 29 runs
Wankhede Stadium, Mumbai
Umpires: Kumar Dharmasena (SL) and Ulhas Gandhe (Ind)
Player of the match: Romario Shepherd (Mumbai Indians)

- Delhi Capitals won the toss and elected to field.

Match 26
12 April 2024
19:30 (N)
Scorecard

| (H) Lucknow Super Giants; 167/7 (20 overs) | v | Delhi Capitals; 170/4 (18.1 overs) |
| Ayush Badoni 55* (35); Kuldeep Yadav 3/20 (4 overs) | | Jake Fraser-McGurk 55 (35); Ravi Bishnoi 2/25 (4 overs) |

Delhi Capitals won by 6 wickets
BRSABV Ekana Cricket Stadium, Lucknow
Umpires: Yeshwant Barde (Ind) and Rohan Pandit (Ind)
Player of the match: Kuldeep Yadav (Delhi Capitals)

- Lucknow Super Giants won the toss and elected to bat.

Match 32
17 April 2024
19:30 (N)
Scorecard

| (H) Gujarat Titans; 89 (17.3 overs) | v | Delhi Capitals; 92/4 (8.5 overs) |
| Rashid Khan 31 (24); Mukesh Kumar 3/14 (2.3 overs) | | Jake Fraser-McGurk 20 (10); Sandeep Warrier 2/40 (3 overs) |

Delhi Capitals won by 6 wickets
Narendra Modi Stadium, Ahmedabad
Umpires: Virender Sharma (Ind) and Nikhil Patwardhan (Ind)
Player of the match: Rishabh Pant (Delhi Capitals)

- Delhi Capitals won the toss and elected to field.
- Gujarat Titans recorded their lowest innings total in IPL history.

Match 35
20 April 2024
19:30 (N)
Scorecard

| Sunrisers Hyderabad; 266/7 (20 overs) | v | Delhi Capitals (H); 199 (19.1 overs) |
| Travis Head 89 (32); Kuldeep Yadav 4/55 (4 overs) | | Jake Fraser-McGurk 65 (18); T Natarajan 4/19 (4 overs) |

Sunrisers Hyderabad won by 67 runs
Arun Jaitley Stadium, Delhi
Umpires: Jayaraman Madanagopal (Ind) and Navdeep Singh (Ind)
Player of the match: Travis Head (Sunrisers Hyderabad)

- Delhi Capitals won the toss and elected to field.

Match 40
24 April 2024
19:30 (N)
Scorecard

| (H) Delhi Capitals; 224/4 (20 overs) | v | Gujarat Titans; 220/8 (20 overs) |
| Rishabh Pant 88* (43); Sandeep Warrier 3/15 (3 overs) | | Sai Sudharsan 65 (39); Rasikh Salam 3/44 (4 overs) |

Delhi Capitals won by 4 runs
Arun Jaitley Stadium, Delhi
Umpires: K. N. Ananthapadmanabhan (Ind) and Ulhas Gandhe (Ind)
Player of the match: Rishabh Pant (Delhi Capitals)

- Gujarat Titans won the toss and elected to field.

Match 43
27 April 2024
15:30 (D/N)
Scorecard

| (H) Delhi Capitals; 257/4 (20 overs) | v | Mumbai Indians; 247/9 (20 overs) |
| Jake Fraser-McGurk 84 (27); Mohammad Nabi 1/20 (2 overs) | | Tilak Varma 63 (32); Rasikh Salam 3/34 (4 overs) |

Delhi Capitals won by 10 runs
Arun Jaitley Stadium, Delhi
Umpires: Nikhil Patwardhan (Ind) and Navdeep Singh (Ind)
Player of the match: Jake Fraser-McGurk (Delhi Capitals)

- Mumbai Indians won the toss and elected to field.

Match 47
29 April 2024
19:30 (N)
Scorecard

| Delhi Capitals; 153/9 (20 overs) | v | Kolkata Knight Riders (H); 157/3 (16.3 overs) |
| Kuldeep Yadav 35* (26); Varun Chakravarthy 3/16 (4 overs) | | Phil Salt 68 (33); Axar Patel 2/25 (4 overs) |

Kolkata Knight Riders won by 7 wickets
Eden Gardens, Kolkata
Umpires: Tapan Sharma (Ind) and Navdeep Singh (Ind)
Player of the match: Varun Chakravarthy (Kolkata Knight Riders)

- Delhi Capitals won the toss and elected to bat.

Match 56
7 May 2024
19:30 (N)
Scorecard

| (H) Delhi Capitals; 221/8 (20 overs) | v | Rajasthan Royals; 201/8 (20 overs) |
| Abhishek Porel 65 (36); Ravichandran Ashwin 3/24 (4 overs) | | Sanju Samson 86 (46); Kuldeep Yadav 2/25 (4 overs) |

Delhi Capitals won by 20 runs
Arun Jaitley Stadium, Delhi
Umpires: K. N. Ananthapadmanabhan (Ind) and Ulhas Gandhe (Ind)
Player of the match: Kuldeep Yadav (Delhi Capitals)

- Rajasthan Royals won the toss and elected to field.

Match 62
12 May 2024
19:30 (N)
Scorecard

| (H) Royal Challengers Bengaluru; 187/9 (20 overs) | v | Delhi Capitals; 140 (19.1 overs) |
| Rajat Patidar 52 (32); Rasikh Salam 2/23 (3 overs) | | Axar Patel 57 (39); Yash Dayal 3/20 (3.1 overs) |

Royal Challengers Bengaluru won by 47 runs
M. Chinnaswamy Stadium, Bengaluru
Umpires: Nand Kishore (Ind) and Vineet Kulkarni (Ind)
Player of the match: Cameron Green (Royal Challengers Bengaluru)

- Delhi Capitals won the toss and elected to field.

Match 64
14 May 2024
19:30 (N)
Scorecard

| (H) Delhi Capitals; 208/4 (20 overs) | v | Lucknow Super Giants; 189/9 (20 overs) |
| Abishek Porel 58 (33); Naveen-ul-Haq 2/51 (4 overs) | | Nicholas Pooran 61 (27); Ishant Sharma 3/34 (4 overs) |

Delhi Capitals won by 19 runs
Arun Jaitley Stadium, Delhi
Umpires: Vinod Seshan (Ind) and Akshay Totre (Ind)
Player of the match: Ishant Sharma (Delhi Capitals)

- Lucknow Super Giants won the toss and elected to field.
- Rajasthan Royals qualified for the playoffs as a result of this match.

== Statistics ==
=== Most runs ===
| Runs | Player | Innings | Highest score |
|---|---|---|---|
| 446 | Rishabh Pant | 13 | 88 not out |
| 378 | Tristan Stubbs | 13 | 71 not out |
| 330 | Jake Fraser-McGurk | 9 | 84 |
| 327 | Abhishek Porel | 12 | 65 |
| 235 | Axar Patel | 12 | 66 |

- Source: ESPNcricinfo

=== Most wickets ===
| Wickets | Player | Matches | Best bowling |
|---|---|---|---|
| 17 | Mukesh Kumar | 10 | 3/14 |
| 17 | Khaleel Ahmed | 14 | 2/21 |
| 16 | Kuldeep Yadav | 11 | 4/55 |
| 11 | Axar Patel | 14 | 2/25 |
| 10 | Ishant Sharma | 9 | 3/23 |

- Source: ESPNcricinfo
