= 2013 Kings XI Punjab season =

Cricket team season

Kings XI Punjab
2013 season
- Coach: Darren Lehmann
- Captain: David Hussey
- Ground(s): PCA Stadium, Mohali
- IPL: 6th
- Most runs: David Miller (418)
- Most wickets: Azhar Mahmood (15)

Kings XI Punjab (KXIP) is a franchise cricket team based in Mohali, India, which plays in the Indian Premier League (IPL). They were one of the nine teams that competed in the 2013 Indian Premier League. They were captained by David Hussey. Kings XI Punjab finished 6th in the IPL and did not qualify for the Champions League T20.

== Squad ==
Players with international caps prior to the 2013 season are listed in bold.

No.	Name	Nat	Birth date	Batting Style	Bowling Style	Notes
Batsmen
03	**Luke Pomersbach**	(Australia)	28 September 1984 (aged 28)	Left-handed	Right-arm off break	Overseas
07	Paul Valthaty	(India)	7 December 1983 (aged 29)	Right-handed	Right-arm medium	
10	**David Miller**	(South Africa)	10 June 1989 (aged 23)	Left-handed	Right-arm off break	Overseas
12	Mandeep Singh	(India)	18 December 1991 (aged 21)	Right-handed	Right-arm medium	
14	**Shaun Marsh**	(Australia)	9 July 1983 (aged 29)	Left-handed	Slow left arm orthodox	Overseas
21	Sunny Singh	(India)	18 December 1986 (aged 26)	Right-handed	Right-arm medium	
22	Gurkeerat Singh	(India)	29 June 1990 (aged 22)	Right-handed	Right-arm off break	Occasional wicketkeeper
29	**David Hussey**	(Australia)	15 July 1977 (aged 35)	Right-handed	Right-arm off break	Vice-captain; Overseas
36	Siddharth Chitnis	(India)	6 May 1987 (aged 25)	Right-handed	Right-arm off break	
54	Manan Vohra	(India)	18 July 1993 (aged 19)	Right-handed	Right-arm medium	
All-rounders
04	Bipul Sharma	(India)	28 September 1983 (aged 29)	Left-handed	Slow left arm orthodox	
17	**Dimitri Mascarenhas**	(England)	30 October 1977 (aged 35)	Right-handed	Right-arm fast-medium	Overseas
23	Rajagopal Sathish	(India)	14 January 1981 (aged 32)	Right-handed	Right-arm medium	
27	**Azhar Mahmood**	(Pakistan)	28 February 1975 (aged 38)	Right-handed	Right-arm fast-medium	Overseas; British passport
Wicket-keepers
18	**Adam Gilchrist**	(Australia)	14 November 1971 (aged 41)	Left-handed	Right-arm off break	Captain; Overseas
63	Nitin Saini	(India)	28 October 1988 (aged 24)	Right-handed	-	
Bowlers
08	**Praveen Kumar**	(India)	2 October 1986 (aged 26)	Right-handed	Right-arm medium	
11	**Piyush Chawla**	(India)	24 December 1988 (aged 24)	Left-handed	Right-arm leg break	
13	Bhargav Bhatt	(India)	13 May 1990 (aged 22)	Left-handed	Slow left arm orthodox	
30	Harmeet Singh	(India)	9 October 1987 (aged 25)	Right-handed	Right-arm medium	
34	**Parvinder Awana**	(India)	19 July 1986 (aged 26)	Right-handed	Right-arm medium	
45	**Ryan Harris**	(Australia)	11 October 1979 (aged 33)	Right-handed	Right arm fast	Overseas
51	**Manpreet Gony**	(India)	4 January 1984 (aged 29)	Right-handed	Right-arm medium	
66	Sandeep Sharma	(India)	18 May 1993 (aged 19)	Right-handed	Right-arm medium	
–	Aniket Choudhary	(India)	28 January 1990 (aged 23)	Right-handed	Left-arm medium-fast	
31	Michael Neser	(Australia)	29 March 1990 (aged 23)	Right-hand bat	Right-arm medium	Overseas

== Indian Premier League ==
=== Season standings ===
Kings XI Punjab finished 6th in the league stage of IPL 2013.

Pos	Team	Pld	W	L	NR	Pts	NRR
1	Chennai Super Kings (R)	16	11	5	0	22	0.530
2	Mumbai Indians (C)	16	11	5	0	22	0.441
3	Rajasthan Royals (3rd)	16	10	6	0	20	0.322
4	Sunrisers Hyderabad (4th)	16	10	6	0	20	0.003
5	Royal Challengers Bangalore	16	9	7	0	18	0.457
6	Kings XI Punjab	16	8	8	0	16	0.226
7	Kolkata Knight Riders	16	6	10	0	12	−0.095
8	Pune Warriors India	16	4	12	0	8	−1.006
9	Delhi Daredevils	16	3	13	0	6	−0.848

"C" refers to the champions of the tournament, R to the runners-up.

=== Match log ===
No.	Date	Opponent	Venue	Result	Scorecard
1	April 7, 2013	Pune Warriors India	Pune	Won By 8 Wickets MoM – Manan Vohra 43* (28)	Score Board
2	April 10, 2013	Chennai Super Kings	Mohali	Lost by 10 Wickets	Score Board
3	April 14, 2013	Rajasthan Royals	Jaipur	Lost by 6 wickets	
4	April 16, 2013	Kolkata Knight Riders	Mohali	Won by 4 Runs MoM – Manpreet Gony 42 (18) & 1-18	
5	April 19, 2013	Sunrisers Hyderabad	Hyderabad	Lost by 5 Wickets	
6	April 21, 2013	Pune Warriors India	Mohali	Won by 7 Wickets MoM – David Miller 80* (41)	
7	April 23, 2013	Delhi Daredevils	New Delhi	Won by 5 Wickets MoM – Harmeet Singh 3/24 (4 overs)	
8	April 26, 2013	Kolkata Knight Riders	Kolkata	Lost by 6 Wickets	
9	April 29, 2013	Mumbai Indians	Mumbai	Lost by 4 Runs	
10	May 2, 2013	Chennai Super Kings	Chennai	Lost by 15 Runs	
11	May 6, 2013	Royal Challengers Bangalore	Mohali	Won by 6 Wickets MoM – David Miller 101* (38)	
12	May 9, 2013	Rajasthan Royals	Mohali	Lost by 8 Wickets	
13	May 11, 2013	Sunrisers Hyderabad	Mohali	Lost by 30 Runs	
14	May 14, 2013	Royal Challengers Bangalore	Bengaluru	Won by 7 Wickets MoM – Adam Gilchrist 85*(54)	
15	May 16, 2013	Delhi Daredevils	Dharmasala	Won by 7 Runs MoM – David Miller 44*(24)	
16	May 18, 2013	Mumbai Indians	Dharamsala	Won by 50 Runs MoM - Azhar Mahmood 80(44) & 2-24	
Overall record: 8-8. Failed to advance.
