= 2013 Delhi Daredevils season =

Indian Premier League cricket team season

Delhi Daredevils
2013 season
- Coach: Eric Simons
- Captain: Mahela Jayawardene
- Ground(s): Feroz Shah Kotla, Delhi
- IPL: 9th place
- Most runs: David Warner (410)
- Most wickets: Umesh Yadav (16)

Delhi Daredevils (DD) are a franchise cricket team based in Delhi, India, which plays in the Indian Premier League (IPL). They were one of the nine teams that competed in the 2013 Indian Premier League. They were captained by Mahela Jayawardene. Delhi Daredevils finished ninth in the IPL and did not qualify for the Champions League T20.

== Indian Premier League ==
=== Standings ===
Delhi Daredevils finished last in the league stage of IPL 2013.

Pos	Team	Pld	W	L	NR	Pts	NRR
1	Chennai Super Kings (R)	16	11	5	0	22	0.530
2	Mumbai Indians (C)	16	11	5	0	22	0.441
3	Rajasthan Royals (3rd)	16	10	6	0	20	0.322
4	Sunrisers Hyderabad (4th)	16	10	6	0	20	0.003
5	Royal Challengers Bangalore	16	9	7	0	18	0.457
6	Kings XI Punjab	16	8	8	0	16	0.226
7	Kolkata Knight Riders	16	6	10	0	12	−0.095
8	Pune Warriors India	16	4	12	0	8	−1.006
9	Delhi Daredevils	16	3	13	0	6	−0.848

"C" refers to the champions of the tournament, R to the runners-up.

=== Match log ===
No.	Date	Opponent	Venue	Result	Scorecard
1	3 April 2013	Kolkata Knight Riders	Kolkata	Lost by 6 wickets	KKR vs. DD
2	6 April 2013	Rajasthan Royals	New Delhi	Lost by 5 runs	DD vs. RR
3	6 April 2013	Mumbai Indians	Mumbai	Lost by 44 runs	MI vs. DD
4	12 April 2013	Sunrisers Hyderabad	New Delhi	Lost By 3 wickets	DD vs. SH
5	16 April 2013	Royal Challengers Bangalore	Bengaluru	Scores level; Lost Super Over by 4 runs	RCB vs. DD
6	18 April 2013	Chennai Super Kings	New Delhi	Lost by 86 runs	DD vs. CSK
7	21 April 2013	Mumbai Indians	New Delhi	Won by 9 wickets, MoM - Virender Sehwag 95* (57)	DD vs. MI
8	23 April 2013	Kings XI Punjab	Mohali	Lost by 5 wickets	
9	28 April 2013	Pune Warriors India	Raipur	Won by 15 runs; MoM - David Warner 51* (25)	
10	1 May 2013	Kolkata Knight Riders	Raipur	Won by 7 wickets; MoM - David Warner 66* (42)	
11	4 May 2013	Sunrisers Hyderabad	Hyderabad	Lost by 6 wickets	
12	7 May 2013	Rajasthan Royals	Jaipur	Lost by 9 wickets	
13	10 May 2013	Royal Challengers Bangalore	New Delhi	Lost by 4 runs	
14	14 May 2013	Chennai Super Kings	Chennai	Lost by 33 runs	
15	16 May 2013	Kings XI Punjab	New Delhi	Lost by 8 runs	
16	18 May 2013	Pune Warriors India	Pune	Lost by 38 runs	
Overall record: 3–13. Failed to advance.

== Statistics ==
Most runs
Player	Runs
David Warner	410
Mahela Jayawardene	331
Virender Sehwag	295

Most wickets
Player	Wickets
Umesh Yadav	16
Ashish Nehra	11
Irfan Pathan	10
