= Kiran Kumar Grandhi =

Indian businessperson

Kiran Kumar Grandhi is the current chairman and co-owner of the Delhi Capitals in the Indian Premier League. Since 1999, Grandhi has been a member of the board of the GMR Group.
