= Jetking Infotrain =

Jetking Infotrain Limited
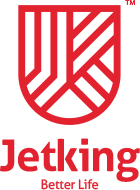
- Company type: Public
- Traded as: BSE: 517063
- Industry: IT education
- Founded: 1947, 1990 the company established
- Founder: Late Mr. G P. Bharwani
- Headquarters: Mumbai, India
- Key people: Suresh G Bharwani (Chairman Emeritus); Nandu G Bharwani (Vice Chairman and Director)
- Services: IT Education and training
- Website: Jetking.com | Jetking.org

Established in 1947, Jetking Infotrain Limited is an Indian computer networking institute, which trains technical and non-technical students. Jetking has 1 centers spread across India .

== Educational courses ==
Jetking is an ISO-recognised institute. Jetking provides courses like Cloud Computing, Cyber Security, Animation, Gaming and Metaverse Design, Data Science, Block Chain and Technical Support Engineer which entail student's education in the field of IT Industry. Other courses like CCNA and Advance Network Security and Ethical Hacking are also provided.

== Operations and domestic expansion ==
Jetking, which has 100 plus centres across India and Overseas at present. The company provides training to nearly 35,000 students each year.

== International foray ==
Jetking has been said to have plans to open centres in Sri Lanka, Bangladesh, Nepal and Nigeria

== Bitcoin Treasury Operations ==
Jetking Infotrain has adopted the 'Bitcoin Only, Bitcoin Forever' strategy for their business. Their first Bitcoin purchase was as early as March 2022, making them a pioneer in India by being the first company in India to do so. The company’s total Bitcoin holdings stand at 21 BTC (post fees and charges) as of December 31, 2024. According to their Investors Relations update, they are actively working with regulators and liaising with key stakeholders to scale their Bitcoin acquisition strategy. Jetking also intends to explore strategies to raise and allocate capital with the goal of being India’s Bitcoin Treasury Reserve Company.
