= Hero FinCorp =

Indian financial institution

Hero FinCorp Ltd
- Industry: Financial services
- Founded: 1991
- Headquarters: New Delhi, India
- Key people: Abhimanyu Munjal, CEO
- Products: Personal loans, Two Wheeler Loan, Loan Against Property, UnSecured loan, SME & Commercial Loans
- Services: Unified Payments Interface
- Rating: AA+ / Stable (CRISIL and ICRA)
- Website: herofincorp.com

Hero FinCorp is an Indian non-banking financial company (NBFC) and an associate company of Hero MotoCorp. It provides consumer finance services, including financing for Hero MotoCorp vehicles, Personal Loan and loans against property. It is also engaged in commercial lending, such as working capital loans and machinery loans.

== History ==
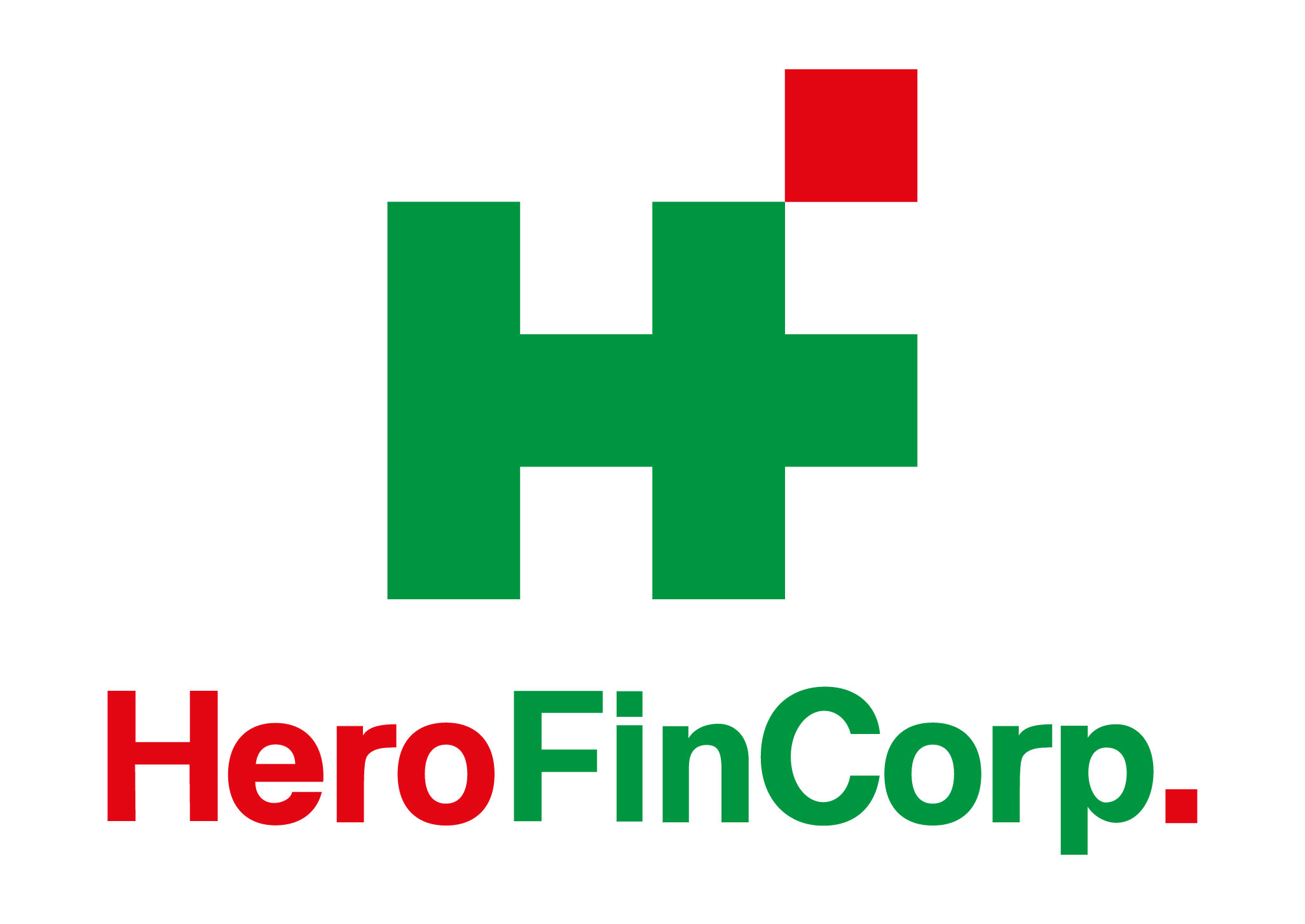
Previous logo

The company was launched in 1992 as Hero Honda Finlease Ltd by extending working capital loans and medium-term finance to component suppliers and dealers of parent firm Hero MotoCorp, then called Hero Honda Motors Ltd.

In 2011, as Hero Honda Motors was restructured, the company was renamed Hero FinCorp and acquired its present form. By April 2013, the company began giving two-wheelers loans to customers. In 2014, it ventured into loans against property, loans for small and medium enterprises and commercial loans.

In September 2016, Hero FinCorp raised about ₹1,002 crore, out of which ₹702 crore was raised from ChrysCapital and Credit Suisse, while the remaining ₹300 crore was raised from the Hero Group. ChrysCapital acquired an 11% stake in Hero FinCorp while Credit Suisse obtained around 2.5%, valuing the company around ₹5,200 crore.

== Services ==
Hero FinCorp provides financing for purchase of Hero MotoCorp two wheelers. It also provides financing options for its existing customers who have availed loans to purchase two-wheelers from Hero MotoCorp. The company later started financing of used cars.

The company provides loans against property to corporates, partnership firms and self-employed individuals.

In early 2020, the company launched SimplyCash app and entered the instant cash loan segment.
