= Abishek Porel =

Indian cricketer (born 2002)

Personal information
- Born: 17 October 2002 (age 24); Chandannagar, West Bengal, India
- Batting: Left-handed
- Role: Wicket-keeper-batter
- Relatives: Ishan Porel (cousin)

Domestic team information
- Years: Team
- 2022–present: Bengal
- 2023–present: Delhi Capitals

Career statistics
Competition	FC	LA	T20
Matches	32	23	61
Runs scored	1,408	833	1,590
Batting average	31.28	43.84	30.00
100s/50s	1/12	2/5	0/11
Top score	114	170*	81
Catches/stumpings	114/10	33/4	20/1
- Source: Cricinfo, 11 August 2026

Abishek Porel (born 17 October 2002) is an Indian cricketer who plays for Bengal in domestic cricket and Delhi Capitals in the Indian Premier League as a wicket-keeper batsman.

== Indian Premier League ==
In the 2023 Indian Premier League, he was brought in by Delhi Capitals as a replacement for injured Rishabh Pant. He made his debut against Gujarat Titans on 4 April 2023 and scored 20 runs off 11 balls. He played four games that season and scored a total of 33 runs at an average of 8.25 and strike rate of 106.45.

In the 2024 Indian Premier League, he was retained by Delhi Capitals. He played all 14 league games, scored a total of 327 runs at an average of 32.70 with two 50s. His strike rate was 159.51.

On 31 October 2024, Abhishek was retained by Delhi Capitals as uncapped player for ₹4 crore (equivalent to ₹4.3 crore or US$460,000 in 2026). He was one of the four players retained by Delhi Capitals for the 2025 Indian Premier League.

In the 2025 Indian Premier League, he played 13 league games, scored a total of 301 runs at an average of 25.08 with one score above 50. His strike rate was 146.82.

== Controversy ==
On 11 August, 2026, Porel was arrested by West Bengal Police in connection with a rape case filed by a medical student from Karnataka. The student alleged that Porel established sexual relations in 2023 on the grounds that he would promise to marry her. There are also additional allegations of criminal intimidation, as Porel supposedly threatened to make private photos public, and of an assault in Delhi. Porel had denied all the allegations earlier.
