= Axar Patel =

Indian cricketer (born 1994)

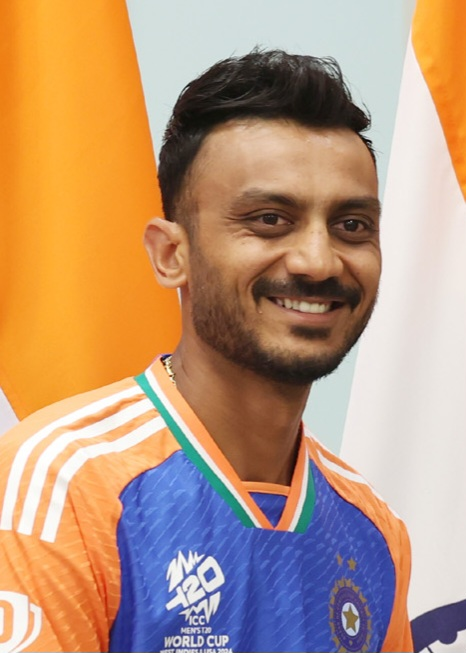
- Axar in 2024

Personal information
- Full name: Akshar Rajeshbhai Patel
- Born: 20 January 1994 (age 32); Anand, Gujarat, India
- Nickname: Axar, Bapu
- Batting: Left-handed
- Bowling: Slow left-arm orthodox
- Role: All-rounder

International information
- National side: India (2014–present)
- Test debut (cap 302): 13 February 2021 v England
- Last Test: 14 November 2025 v South Africa
- ODI debut (cap 153): 15 June 2014 v Bangladesh
- Last ODI: 14 July 2026 v England
- ODI shirt no.: 20
- T20I debut (cap 53): 17 July 2015 v Zimbabwe
- Last T20I: 17 September 2026 v Afghanistan
- T20I shirt no.: 20

Domestic team information
- Years: Team
- 2012–present: Gujarat
- 2014–2018: Kings XI Punjab
- 2018: Durham
- 2019–present: Delhi Capitals

Career statistics
Competition	Test	ODI	T20I	FC
Matches	15	71	91	57
Runs scored	688	858	700	2,517
Batting average	34.40	23.18	18.42	35.95
100s/50s	0/4	0/3	0/1	1/19
Top score	84	64*	65	110*
Balls bowled	2,660	3,287	1,624	11,842
Wickets	57	75	93	197
Bowling average	19.66	32.81	21.30	25.25
5 wickets in innings	5	0	0	11
10 wickets in match	1	0	0	2
Best bowling	6/38	3/24	3/9	7/54
Catches/stumpings	4/–	29/–	31/–	25/–
Medal record
Men's cricket
Representing India
ICC World Test Championship
Runner-up	2021–2023
ICC T20 World Cup
Winner	2024 West Indies & USA
Winner	2026 India & Sri Lanka
ICC Champions Trophy
Winner	2025 Pakistan
ACC Asia Cup
Winner	2018 UAE
Winner	2023 Pakistan
Winner	2025 UAE
Asian Games
Gold medal – first place	2026 Aichi-Nagoya
ACC Emerging Asia Cup
Winner	2013 Singapore
- Source: ESPNcricinfo, 26 February 2026

Akshar Rajeshbhai Patel (born 20 January 1994) is an Indian international cricketer. He plays for the Indian national team as an all-rounder in all the three formats. He is a left-handed batter and slow left-arm orthodox bowler. Patel represents Gujarat in domestic cricket and captains Delhi Capitals in the Indian Premier League. He was part of the Indian teams that won the 2024 and 2026 T20 World Cups and the 2025 Champions Trophy.

He made his ODI debut on 15 June 2014 against Bangladesh. He was selected in India's 15-man squad for the 2015 Cricket World Cup held in Australia and New Zealand. He made his Test debut for India against England on 13 February 2021, where he took 7 wickets. He became the ninth bowler for India to take a five-wicket haul on debut in Test cricket.

== Domestic career ==
In his second first-class match, against Delhi in November 2013, Patel took 6 for 55 in the first innings. This was his first five-wicket haul.

Patel played just one first-class game in his debut season for Gujarat, but had a more successful showing in 2013. Slotted primarily as a bowling allrounder, the left-arm spinner got his first IPL contract with Mumbai Indians ahead of IPL 2013, although he was on the bench for the entire season, the team won the title in that year.

He was one of the key contributors to India Under-23s' title win in the 2013 ACC Emerging Teams Cup, with seven wickets, including a four-for in the semi-final against UAE. He was one of the consistent performers for Gujarat in the 2013/14 Ranji Trophy, finishing the season with 369 runs at an average of 46.12 and 29 wickets at 23.58. In early 2014, he was named the BCCI Under-19 cricketer of the year for the 2012/13 season.

In August 2019, he was named in the India Red team's squad for the 2019–20 Duleep Trophy. In October 2019, he was named in India C's squad for the 2019–20 Deodhar Trophy.

=== IPL career ===
Patel was signed up by the IPL franchise Mumbai Indians in 2013 but did not get a chance to play until he was released. He was then picked up by Kings XI Punjab in 2014 and had an impressive season with 17 wickets. He was retained by the Kings XI Punjab for the 2015 IPL season. Batting lower down the order, he scored 206 runs for the Kings XI Punjab in 2015 in addition to taking 13 wickets. On 1 May 2016, during a match against the Gujarat Lions, he took four wickets in five balls, including the first (and only) hat-trick of the 2016 IPL season, to pave the way for Kings XI Punjab's 23-run win against table-toppers Gujarat Lions in Rajkot. He was retained by Kings XI Punjab for the 2018 season.

Axar Patel became the 9th Indian player to take a five-wicket haul on Test debut and only the second left-arm spinner after Dilip Doshi to take a five-for in his debut Test.

In December 2018, he was signed up by the Delhi Capitals in the player auction for the 2019 Indian Premier League. He was retained by Delhi capitals for the 2021 season.

== International career ==
After excellent performance in the 2014 IPL, Patel was rewarded with a place in the Indian ODI squad for the tour to Bangladesh and made his ODI debut in the first match of series at Sher-e-Bangla National Stadium and took 1/59 runs. He was part of India's 15-man squad for the 2015 Cricket World Cup.

He made his Twenty20 International debut for India against Zimbabwe on 17 July 2015. He was named as a stand-by player for India's squad for the 2019 Cricket World Cup.

In January 2021, Patel was named in India's Test squad for their series against England. He made his Test debut against England on 13 February 2021 and made his comeback in international cricket after a gap of almost three years. His first international Test wicket was of Joe Root. In the same match, he took a five wicket haul in England's second innings, becoming the ninth Indian bowler to do so on debut. In the 3 matches he played in his debut series, he took 27 wickets at a mere average of 10.59, finishing as the second-highest wicket taker of the series. Later in the year, he scored his maiden Test half-century against New Zealand.

In September 2021, Patel was named in India's squad for the 2021 ICC Men's T20 World Cup. However, on 13 October 2021, he was replaced by Shardul Thakur in India's squad.

In November 2021, Patel was named in India's squad for New Zealand's tour of India in 2021.

In June 2022, Patel was named in India's squad for their T20I series against Ireland.

On 25 July 2022, Patel scored his maiden ODI half-century against West Indies. He scored 64 runs off 35 balls, and remained unbeaten as he scored a match-winning six.

In May 2024, he was named in India's squad for the 2024 ICC Men's T20 World Cup tournament. In India's first match against Ireland, he took 1 wicket off just his one over. However, due to a quick run chase, he did not get a chance to bat. In India's second match against Pakistan, he took 1 wicket off his two overs, and made 20 runs off 18 balls with the bat. In India's third match against the United States, he took 1 wicket at the economy of 8.33. India's fourth match against Canada was washed out with a ball bowled. In India's first match of the Super 8, against Afghanistan, he made 12 off 6 and took 1 wicket at the economy of 5.00. In India's second match of the Super 8, against Bangladesh, he made 3 runs and did not take a wicket but bowled 2 overs at the economy of 13.00. In India's third and final match of the Super 8, against Australia, he did not bat, but took 1 wicket at the economy of 7.00. In the semi-final against England, he was named the POTM, making 10 runs and taking 3 wickets. In the final against South Africa, he was crucial, taking a wicket at the economy rate of 12.33 and making a quickfire 47 off 31, with 4 sixes and 1 four.

In July 2025, against England he took his 100th T20I wicket and became the first Indian spinner to achieve this record in T20Is.

== Personal life ==
He married Meha Patel on 26 January 2023 in Vadodara, Gujarat. He welcomed his son, Haksh, on 19 December 2024.

== Awards ==
- BCCI Under-19 Cricketer of the Year 2014
- Emerging Player of the Tournament in 2014 IPL
