= Delhi Capitals =

Delhi-based cricket franchise in the Indian Premier League

- League: Indian Premier League

Personnel
- Captain: Axar Patel
- Coach: Sourav Ganguly
- Owner: JSW Sports; GMR Sports

Team information
- City: New Delhi, India
- Colours: Blue, Red & Sky Blue
- Founded: 2008; 18 years ago (as Delhi Daredevils)
- Home ground: Arun Jaitley Cricket Stadium, New Delhi
- Capacity: 35,200
- Secondary home ground(s): ACA–VDCA Cricket Stadium, Visakhapatnam
- Secondary ground capacity: 27,500
- Official website: delhicapitals.in
Regular kit
Diversity tribute kit

The Delhi Capitals, formerly the Delhi Daredevils, are a professional Twenty20 cricket team based in Delhi that competes in the Indian Premier League (IPL). The franchise is owned by GMR Group and JSW Sports. Its home ground is Arun Jaitley Stadium in New Delhi. The team is captained by Axar Patel, and is coached by Sourav Ganguly. It first appeared in their first IPL final in 2020 against Mumbai Indians.

== History ==
=== Foundation ===
The IPL is a cricket league organised by the Board of Control for Cricket in India (BCCI) and backed by the International Cricket Council (ICC). The inaugural tournament was held in April–June 2008, in which the BCCI finalised a list of eight teams that participated in the tournament. The teams represented eight different cities in India, including Delhi. The teams were put up for auction in Mumbai on 20 February 2008, and the Delhi team was bought by the property development company GMR Group for US$84 million.

In March 2018, GMR sold a 50% stake in the Delhi Daredevils to JSW Sports for ₹550 crore (US$59 million).

JSW Sports is also the owner of Hockey India League team Soorma Hockey Club, Pro Kabaddi League team Haryana Steelers, Indian Super League team Bengaluru FC, SA20 team Pretoria Capitals, and ILT20 team Dubai Capitals.

In December 2018, the team changed its name from the Delhi Daredevils to the Delhi Capitals. Speaking about the rationale behind changing the team's name, co-owner and chairman Parth Jindal said, "Delhi is the power centre of the country, it is the capital, therefore the name Delhi Capitals." Co-owner Kiran Kumar Grandhi said, "The new name symbolizes Delhi's identity and just like the city, we are aiming to be the centre of all action going forward."

Subject to ratification by the England and Wales Cricket Board, in 2024 the franchise agreed a £120 million deal to buy Hampshire County Cricket Club in England, as well as a 51% stake in the Hundred team Southern Brave.

=== 2008 IPL ===
During the inaugural edition of the IPL, the Delhi Daredevils won their initial two matches against the Rajasthan Royals and the Deccan Chargers. Then, after losing a match to the Kings XI Punjab, the team won their next two matches against the Royal Challengers Bangalore and the Chennai Super Kings.

However, the Delhi Daredevils lost in four straight matches, breaking the streak with a win against the Deccan Chargers. After another loss against the Kings XI Punjab, they recovered and won three matches to finish in the final four of the league.

The Delhi Daredevils lost to eventual champions, the Rajasthan Royals, in the semi-final.

=== 2009 IPL ===
The Daredevils dominated for much of the 2009 IPL season under the captaincy of former Indian opener and Delhi-native, Gautam Gambhir, finishing at the top of the table. The likes of former Indian opener and triple-Centurion Virender Sehwag and Gambhir had both developed since the prior season. They set up many large totals for the Daredevils, with South African power hitter and part-time keeper AB de Villiers hitting one of only two centuries in the 2009 IPL (the other was made by the young Indian batter Manish Pandey) at a match in South Africa. The bowling team, which was composed mainly of New Zealander spin pro Daniel Vettori, India senior spinner Amit Mishra, Pradeep Sangwan, and former India fast bowler Ashish Nehra, was bolstered by the off-season signing of Australian Dirk Nannes, which created a strong bowling line-up. The batting of the Daredevils featured Sehwag, Gambhir, power hitter Dilshan, AB de Villiers, and Manoj Tiwary. The Daredevils consisted of new and then uncapped players like Australia Captain Aaron Finch and Australia all-rounder Glenn Maxwell, who went on to become successful in various T20 circuits.

However, despite finishing at the top of the points table during the regular season, the Daredevils crumbled in the semi-final after Deccan Chargers' captain Adam Gilchrist hit the then fastest 50 in the IPL history (in just 17 balls). Nannes in particular, who was again picked over Aussie pacer Glenn McGrath, was punished by Gilchrist, and later by Aussie opening all-rounder Andrew Symonds. The semi-final loss meant Delhi did not contest the final of the 2009 IPL season, despite having the best record in the league stages. However, Delhi managed to qualify for the now-defunct 2009 Champions League Twenty20 as a result of their performance in the group stage.

=== 2012 IPL ===
Due to the disbanding of the Kochi Tuskers Kerala, each team played the remaining eight teams twice, once at home and once away. Therefore, each team played an extended season of 16 matches.

In the 2012 IPL season, a new team of the Delhi Daredevils was seen after a poor 2011 season where they finished last. They came back strongly, having purchased players such as Afro-English batting great Kevin Pietersen, Sri Lanka batter Mahela Jayawardene, and Kiwi batter Ross Taylor. They stood first in the Points Table with the Kolkata Knight Riders at second place, the Mumbai Indians coming third, and the defending champions the Chennai Super Kings securing the fourth spot, consequently also qualifying for the Champions League Twenty20 in 2012 held in South Africa.

Australian pace bowler Glenn McGrath expressed disappointment over not being picked to play any match during the whole season, and stopped playing for Delhi.

Former Sri Lankan skipper Mahela Jayawardane was appointed as the new captain of the Delhi Daredevils after Indian opener Virender Sehwag stepped down from captaincy during the 2012 season of the Champions League Twenty20.

=== 2013 IPL ===
Delhi Daredevils lost their first six matches of IPL 2013 and won their first match in their seventh game against the Mumbai Indians. Virender Sehwag and Mahela Jayawardene's partnership led to a win against the Mumbai Indians, in which they scored 161 runs. Sehwag was the "Man of the Match" for his innings of 95* off 57 balls. After this match, they faced the Kings XI Punjab and lost again. But in their ninth match of the season against the Pune Warriors India, they won, putting them in eighth place in the points table. They defeated defending champions the Kolkata Knight Riders in their tenth match by seven wickets but failed to advance to the seventh place due to their net run-rate. In their next match against the Sunrisers Hyderabad, the Delhi Daredevils were bowled out for just 80 runs, giving the Sunrisers a win. In their match against the Rajasthan Royals, they scored 154 runs, thanks to recruit Ben Rohrer's half-century. However, that effort was in vain as the Rajasthan Royals chased the total down with the loss of only one wicket. This loss for the Daredevils officially eliminated them from the 2013 season.

In their next match against the Royal Challengers Bangalore, Delhi managed to contain the Royal Challengers who were 106 in 16.0 overs, but Bangalore scored 77 in their last 4 overs and reached a total of 183, thanks to a 99 by RCB skipper Virat Kohli. The Daredevils lost the match by just four runs. The team next played the Chennai Super Kings who batted first and posted 168 runs. Delhi failed to gain momentum throughout the match and eventually lost by 33 runs. The following match was against the Kings XI Punjab who defeated them again, this time by seven runs, as they failed to chase down 172 runs. Their final game was against the Pune Warriors India. Delhi bowled first and the Pune Warriors posted a total of 171 runs. In the second innings, Delhi maintained the required run rate but began losing quick wickets after the tenth over. They could not chase the target and lost by 38 runs finishing last in the league table. Despite seeing a forgettable season, a few big names were added to the support staff as the season progressed. The legendary West Indies batter Sir Vivian Richards was named as their new brand ambassador, former England spinner Jeremy Snape was added to the support staff, and renowned former Pakistan spinner Mushtaq Ahmed was named as their new spin bowling coach.

=== 2014 IPL ===
Ahead of the IPL 2014 auction, on 10 January 2014, the Delhi Daredevils announced that they would not retain any players from their current squad for season seven. With no players retained, the team had the most "right-to-match" cards among all the franchises at the auction—three. They also had Rs 600 million (approx US$9.6 million) to spend at the auction.

The Delhi Daredevils experienced another poor season in 2014. They lost their first match, against the Royal Challengers Bangalore, however, they won their next match against the Kolkata Knight Riders. This was followed by a loss against the two-time champions the Chennai Super Kings and a close match which resulted in a loss against the Sunrisers Hyderabad. The Delhi Daredevils won their next match against the Mumbai Indians, having restricted them to 125. Later, when the tournament shifted from the makeshift venue in the United Arab Emirates (UAE) to India, Delhi lost their next nine matches. The Delhi Daredevils won only two out of their fourteen matches, both of which took place in the adopted venue in the UAE. Despite their poor performance, South Africa all-rounder JP Duminy, the team captain scored 410 runs from 14 matches at an average of 51.25 and was the tournament's eighth highest run-scorer. The Delhi Daredevils once again finished last.

=== 2015 IPL ===
The team finished seventh in the 2015 edition of the IPL. They received fierce criticism from the Delhi fans due to their string of poor performances in the previous two years.

=== 2016 IPL ===
The Delhi Daredevils released many of their players, including the previous year's most expensive purchase, all-rounder Yuvraj Singh, whom they had bought for ₹16 crores. The Daredevils also released former Sri Lankan skipper and all-rounder Angelo Mathews, who was bought for ₹7.5 crores. New additions to the team included uncapped all-rounder Pawan Negi, who was bought for ₹8.5 crores, thereby becoming the most expensive Indian player in the IPL auction of 2016. Uncapped Indian batter, Sanju Samson and Karun Nair, who previously played for the Rajasthan Royals, were also bought for hefty amounts. South African all-rounder Chris Morris was bought for ₹7 crores. English keeper Sam Billings and Australian Joel Paris also joined the Delhi squad. The team purchased three promising India U-19 players—local keeper Rishabh Pant, Rajasthan's pacer Khaleel Ahmed and Mahipal Lomror. After the Daredevils ended their association with South African batter Gary Kirsten, they appointed Paddy Upton as their head coach. The Indian batter and head coach of India U-19, Rahul Dravid was appointed the Daredevils' batting mentor. Former Indian pacer Zaheer Khan was appointed as the new captain of the Delhi Daredevils in the 2016 IPL season. Relative to their performance in the previous three seasons, the Delhi Daredevils improved the way they played. South African all-rounder Chris Morris got the fastest 50 (17 balls) of the tournament and was also effective in the bowling department. South African wicket-keeper Quinton de Kock was among the leading run-scorers in the season. After losing their first match against two-time champions the Kolkata Knight Riders, the Daredevils went on to dominate the Kings XI Punjab, the Royal Challengers Bangalore, defending champions the Mumbai Indians, the Kolkata Knight Riders in the second leg, and newcomers the Gujarat Lions. They won 5 of their first 7 matches, gaining 10 points. They lost their second match against newcomers the Gujarat Lions by just one run. The Daredevils were the favourites to qualify for the playoffs; however, they finished in sixth with fourteen points in fourteen games.

=== 2017 IPL ===
Delhi lost South Africans de Kock and Duminy before the tournament, placing dependence on a young batting line-up and a bowling line-up of former Indian pacer Zaheer Khan, Indian pacer Mohammed Shami, South African all-rounder Chris Morris, Aussie bowling all-rounder Pat Cummins, South African young pacer Kagiso Rabada, Indian spinner Amit Mishra, young spinner Shahbaz Nadeem, Jayant Yadav and Ben Hilfenhaus. They lost to runners-up RCB in the first game and won by big margins against RPS and KXIP. After this, they lost five consecutive games. However, they bounced back by chasing 189 and 214 against defending champions SRH and GL respectively. Keralite wicket-keeper Sanju Samson got the first century of the season. Young wicket-keeper and local boy Rishabh Pant made 97 against GL. But the Delhi Daredevils lost to then two-time champions MI by a margin of 146 runs, which was the highest win by runs in the IPL history. During the middle of the tournament, captain and former Indian pacer Zaheer Khan was down with an injury to his hamstring which caused him to miss three matches, and young Indian batter Karun Nair was appointed as stand-in captain.

The Delhi Daredevils ended up in the sixth position again with six wins (+12 points) and eight losses for the season.

=== 2018 IPL ===
Going into the big auctions, each franchise were allowed to retain up to three players. Additionally, they could also use Right to Match cards to get back two players during the auctions. Delhi Daredevils retained Shreyas Iyer, Chris Morris and Rishabh Pant. Coach Rahul Dravid had to quit his job as the coach in order to protect his position as coach of India A and India U-19, following a conflict of interest debate. Ricky Ponting was appointed as the new coach.

=== 2019 IPL ===
The Delhi Capitals retained 14 players and traded their former player and India opener Shikhar Dhawan from Sunrisers Hyderabad. This was done by trading off the young all-rounder Vijay Shankar, and Abhishek Sharma and spinner Shahbaz Nadeem for the 12th season of the IPL. Retained players for the twelfth IPL season were: captain and Indian batter Shreyas Iyer, Indian wicket-keeper and left-handed batter Rishabh Pant, young Indian batter Prithvi Shaw, Indian spinner Amit Mishra, young pacer Avesh Khan, uncapped bowler and injured Harshal Patel, uncapped bowling all-rounder Rahul Tewatia, Jayant Yadav, Manjot Kalra, New Zealand opener Colin Munro, New Zealand pacer Trent Boult, South African all-rounder Chris Morris, young South African pacer Kagiso Rabada and young Nepalese spinner Sandeep Lamichhane.

On the IPL auction day, 18 December 2018, DC filled up their 10 available player slots (seven Indian slots and three overseas slots) with: South African batter Colin Ingram, Indian all-rounder Axar Patel, Indian all-rounder Hanuma Vihari, Sherfane Rutherford, Indian pacer Ishant Sharma, West Indian pacer Keemo Paul, and uncapped Indian cricketers Jalaj Saxena, Ankush Bains, Nathu Singh and Bandaru Ayyappa.

Delhi Capitals also brought the former Indian captain Sourav Ganguly as their official advisor and later traded Jayant Yadav to the Mumbai Indians after the IPL 2019 auction.

The Capitals began their campaign with a 37-run victory over 3-time champions Mumbai. The Capitals entered the playoffs after seven years, and they won their first playoffs match against the Sunrisers Hyderabad by two wickets. They lost the second match against the Chennai Super Kings by six wickets and ended up as second runners up in the playoffs, their best-ever finish.

=== 2020 IPL ===
Delhi Capitals released Hanuma Vihari, Jalaj Saxena, Manjot Kalra, Ankush Bains, Nathu Singh, Bandaru Ayappa, Chris Morris, Colin Ingram, and Colin Munro from their 2019 roster. They added Jason Roy, Chris Woakes, Alex Carey, Shimron Hetmyer, Mohit Sharma, Tushar Deshpande, Marcus Stoinis, and Lalit Yadav for their 2020 roster during the IPL Auction. Chris Woakes, however pulled out of the tournament and was replaced by South African fast bowler Anrich Nortje. Jason Roy, became the second player (and second English Player) from Capitals to pull out of the tournament due to injury concerns and personal reasons, he was replaced by Australian bowling all-rounder Daniel Sams.

The team started well in the tournament, winning 7 out of the first 9 games. However, a string of four losses in a row put them in a position where losing their last match could result in failure to make it to the playoffs. They however, were able to defeat Royal Challengers Bangalore in the last match and thus, finished as the second ranked team in league stage. Also, a win over Sunrisers Hyderabad in Qualifier 2 helped them reach the finals for the first time in the history of the IPL. In the finals, they were defeated by Mumbai Indians—the only team that Delhi could not defeat in the tournament despite playing them 4 times. Also, this was the most successful season for Delhi Capitals in the IPL history. In this season, all games were played in the UAE.

=== 2021 IPL ===
The 2021 IPL season was held in India. All teams were scheduled to play at neutral venues (no team played at their home ground). On 30 March 2021, Delhi Capitals officially promoted Steve Smith to captain of the squad after Shreyas Iyer dislocated his shoulder while fielding a ball in the ODI series against England and consequently, was ruled out of the 2021 IPL season. Delhi Capitals had 3 matches at the Wankhede Stadium, followed by 2 in Chennai, 4 in Ahmedabad and 5 in Kolkata. Delhi Capitals had won 6 games out of 8 matches and were placed at the top of the points table before the season was indefinitely suspended following a breach of the COVID-19 bio secure bubble. On 4 May, the tournament was suspended indefinitely, after a rise in COVID-19 cases within the bio bubbles of some teams. At the time of the suspension, 31 of the scheduled 60 matches were still left to be played. On 29 May 2021, the BCCI announced that the remaining matches of the tournament would be played in the United Arab Emirates in September and October 2021. The schedule for the remainder of the tournament was released in July 2021.

=== 2023 IPL ===
DC franchise whose full form is Delhi Capitals has made a significant announcement ahead of the IPL 2023. The team has named David Warner as its captain for the upcoming season, with Axar Patel as his vice-captain. The move comes after captain Rishabh Pant was ruled out of the tournament due to injury.

Delhi could not qualify for the playoffs in the 16th edition of Tata IPL and finished at the 9th spot with 5 victories and 9 losses.

Players like Prithvi Shaw, Axar Patel, and Mitchell Marsh faced struggles with their form. Bowlers could not gain their momentum through the whole season.

=== 2024 IPL ===
Ahead of the 2024 season, Rishabh Pant returned as the captain after missing out the 2023 season due to injury.

=== 2025 IPL ===
Delhi Capitals finished at the 5th position in IPL 2025, with 7 wins and 6 losses from 13 matches and one no-result game against SRH at Hyderabad due to rain. Notably, the game with PBKS at Dharamsala was called off due to what authorities have said was a floodlight failure; however, many fans and news sources have speculated that it may have been a pre-emptive measure following Indian tensions with Pakistan, given the proximity of Dharamshala to the Pakistani border which followed the suspension of the season with immediate effect. The IPL 2025 resumed a week later and the game against PBKS at Dharamsala was voided and played again at the Jaipur.

=== 2026 IPL ===
Delhi Capitals finished at the 6th position in IPL 2026, with 7 wins and 7 losses. The capitals started off the season well with 2 wins before losing their 3rd game against Gujarat Titans narrowly at home. The team then fared poorly at home losing 5 out of 7 games. The Capitals ended with hat trick of wins after enduring a tough middle phase of the season.

== Home ground ==
The Delhi Capitals play their home matches at the Arun Jaitley Stadium located in New Delhi. They also have the modern Shaheed Veer Narayan Singh International Stadium, Raipur as their second home ground, however they haven't played any matches there since 2016. Currently they use the ACA–VDCA Cricket Stadium in Visakhapatnam as their secondary home ground since 2024.

== Ownership ==
The Delhi Capitals is owned and operated by JSW GMR Cricket Pvt. Ltd. (JGCPL), formerly known as GMR Sports Private Limited. The franchise is a 50:50 joint venture between the GMR Sports and JSW Sports, the sports arm of GMR Group and JSW Group respectively .

=== Ownership history ===
The franchise was established in 2008 as the Delhi Daredevils, with the GMR Group winning the initial bidding process for US$84 million. In March 2018, JSW Sports acquired a 50% stake in the team for ₹550 crore (approximately US$84.5 million). Following the entry of JSW as a partner, the franchise was rebranded as the Delhi Capitals in December 2018.

=== Rotational management (2025–2026) ===
In late 2024, the co-owners announced a new operational framework starting with the 2025 season. While the board (comprising senior leadership from both groups) makes collaborative decisions on high-level matters like auctions and retentions, the day-to-day cricketing operations alternate every two years:

- GMR Group: Manages the Indian Premier League (IPL) team operations for the 2025 and 2026 seasons. They also manage the Dubai Capitals in the ILT20 and Hampshire County Cricket Club, including the Southern Brave in The Hundred.
- JSW Group: Manages the Women's Premier League (WPL) team operations for 2025–2026. They also oversee the Pretoria Capitals in the SA20.

In 2027, the roles are scheduled to reverse, with JSW Group taking over the management of the IPL men's team.

=== Financial profile ===
The joint venture, JSW GMR Cricket Pvt. Ltd., maintains a stable credit profile, supported by the financial strength of its parent conglomerates. Major strategic decisions, including player retentions and auction strategy, are governed by a board representing both groups to ensure long-term stability.

== Players ==
Former India opener and Delhi local, Virender Sehwag was accorded the icon player status in the Delhi Daredevils team and was also the captain of the team during the first two seasons. However, he resigned and passed on the leadership to Gautam Gambhir for the 2010 season. But after Gambhir left the team for the Kolkata Knight Riders in the fourth edition, Sehwag was once again given the duty to captain the team. Since the start of the IPL in 2008, many international players such as Australian Glenn McGrath, South African batter AB de Villiers, Sri Lankan player Tillakaratne Dilshan, Australian opener David Warner, Andrew McDonald, New Zealand spinner Daniel Vettori, Farveez Maharoof, Dirk Nannes, and Australian opener Aaron Finch have donned the cap for the Daredevils.

In 2012, they bought Sri Lankan Mahela Jayawardene, Jamaican all-rounder Andre Russell, Doug Bracewell, Morne Morkel and English batter Kevin Pietersen. Following the 2014 mega-auction, the franchise underwent a major overhaul, signing Kevin Pietersen as captain and purchasing Dinesh Karthik for ₹12.5 crore. Subsequent seasons saw a revolving door of captains, including J. P. Duminy (2015–2016) and Zaheer Khan (2016–2017).

The team's fortunes shifted in 2018 when Shreyas Iyer took over the captaincy mid-season from a returning Gautam Gambhir. Under Iyer, the team reached its first-ever IPL final in 2020. During this period, the franchise built a core around young Indian talents such as Rishabh Pant, Prithvi Shaw, and Shikhar Dhawan, while also securing international stars like Kagiso Rabada and Anrich Nortje.

In 2021, Rishabh Pant was appointed captain after Iyer was ruled out due to injury, a role he maintained until 2024, excluding the 2023 season which he missed due to a car accident (where David Warner led the team). Ahead of the 2025 season, the franchise underwent another leadership change, releasing Rishabh Pant and appointing Axar Patel as captain and naming Hemang Badani as head coach. The 2025 squad features high-profile signings including KL Rahul and Mitchell Starc.

== Current squad ==
- Players with international caps are listed in **bold**.
- * denotes a player who is currently unavailable for selection.
- * denotes a player who is unavailable for rest of the season.

No.	Name	Nat	Birth date	Batting style	Bowling style	Year signed	Salary	Notes
Batters
10	**David Miller**	(South Africa)	10 June 1989 (age 37)	Left-handed	Right-arm off break	2026	₹2 crore (US$210,000)	Overseas
30	**Tristan Stubbs**	(South Africa)	14 August 2000 (age 26)	Right-handed	Right-arm off break	2024	₹10 crore (US$1.1 million)	Overseas
100	**Prithvi Shaw**	(India)	9 November 1999 (age 27)	Right-handed	Right-arm off break	2026	₹75 lakh (US$80,000)	
7	Sameer Rizvi	(India)	6 December 2003 (age 22)	Right-handed	Right-arm off break	2025	₹95 lakh (US$100,000)	
77	Ashutosh Sharma	(India)	15 September 1998 (age 28)	Right-handed	Right-arm medium	2025	₹3.8 crore (US$410,000)	
Wicket-keepers
1	**KL Rahul**	(India)	18 April 1992 (age 34)	Right-handed	—N/a	2025	₹14 crore (US$1.5 million)	
17	**Rishabh Pant**	(India)	4 October 1997 (age 29)	Left-handed	—N/a	2027	₹15 crore (US$1.6 million)	
All-rounders				Left-handed				
20	**Axar Patel**	(India)	20 January 1994 (age 32)	Left-handed	Left-arm orthodox	2019	₹16.5 crore (US$1.8 million)	Captain
84	**Auqib Nabi**	(India)	4 November 1996 (age 30)	Right-handed	Right-arm medium	2026	₹8.40 crore (US$900,000)	
98	Tripurana Vijay	(India)	5 September 2001 (age 25)	Right-handed	Right-arm off break	2025	₹30 lakh (US$32,000)	
11	Madhav Tiwari	(India)	28 September 2003 (age 23)	Right-handed	Right-arm medium-fast	2025	₹40 lakh (US$43,000)	
Pace bowlers		(India)						
49	**Mukesh Kumar**	(India)	12 October 1993 (age 33)	Right-handed	Right arm medium	2023	₹8 crore (US$850,000)	
12	**Kyle Jamieson**	(New Zealand)	30 December 1994 (age 31)	Right-handed	Right arm fast fast medium	2026	₹2 crore (US$210,000)	Overseas
22	**Lungi Ngidi**	(South Africa)	29 March 1996 (age 30)	Right-handed	Right arm fast fast medium	2026	₹2 crore (US$210,000)	Overseas
Spin bowlers
28	Vipraj Nigam	(India)	28 July 2002 (age 24)	Right-handed	Right-arm leg break	2025	₹50 lakh (US$53,000)	
99	Zeeshan Ansari	(India)	16 December 1999 (age 26)	Right-handed	Right-arm leg break	2027	₹40 lakh (US$43,000)	
Source: DC Squad

=== Captains ===
Last updated: 10 May 2026

Player	Nationality (Note: The information in the nationality column is according to Cricinfo. This information may not reflect the player's birthplace or citizenship.)	From	To	Matches	Won	Lost	Tied	NR	Win%	Best Result
Virender Sehwag	India	2008	2012	52	28	24	0	0	53.84	Semi Final (2008, 2009)
Gautam Gambhir	India	2009	2018	25	12	13	0	0	48	5/8 (2010)
Dinesh Karthik	India	2009	2018	6	2	4	0	0	33.33	Stand-In
James Hopes	Australia	2011	2011	3	0	2	0	1	0	Stand-In
Mahela Jayawardene	Sri Lanka	2012	2013	18	6	11	1	0	33.33	Playoffs (2012)
Ross Taylor	New Zealand	2012	2012	2	0	1	0	1	0	Stand-In
David Warner	Australia	2013	2023	16	5	11	0	0	31.25	9/10 (2023)
Kevin Pietersen	England	2014	2014	11	1	10	0	0	9.09	9/10 (2023)
JP Duminy	South Africa	2015	2016	16	6	9	0	1	37.5	7/8 (2015)
Zaheer Khan	India	2016	2017	23	10	13	0	0	43.47	6/8 (2016, 2017)
Karun Nair	India	2017	2017	3	2	1	0	0	66.6	Stand-In
Shreyas Iyer	India	2018	2021	41	23	18	0	0	56.09	Runners-up (2020)
Rishabh Pant	India	2021	2024	43	23	20	0	0	53.48	Playoffs (2021)
Axar Patel	India	2024	Present	24	9	13	1	1	37.5	5/10 (2025)
Faf du Plessis	South Africa	2025	2025	2	1	1	0	0	50.00	Stand-in

== Administration and support staff ==
Position	Name
Team manager	(India) Srinath Balaji Nagarajan
Assistant team manager	(India) Raoul McPherson
Director of cricket	(India) Yalaka Venugopal Rao
Head coach	(India) Sourav Ganguly
Batting & Assistant coach	(India) Yuvraj Singh
Fast Bowling coach	(Sri Lanka) Chaminda Vaas
Spin Bowling coach	(India) Amit Mishra
Fielding coach	(Republic of Ireland) John Mooney
Fielding coach	(India) Yalaka Gnaneswara Rao
Head of scouting	(India) Vijay Bharadwaj
Talent scout	(India) Iqbal Abdulla
Physio	(England) Craig Anthony de Weymarn
Assistant physio	(India) Deep Tomar
Assistant physio	(India) Amit Kumar
Strength And Conditioning Coach	(India) Sajan Thakur
Assistant Strength And Conditioning Coach	(India) Sai Pranay Alakanti
Analyst	(India) Hrushikesh Deo
Source: Cricinfo

== Seasons ==
=== Indian Premier League ===
Year	League standing	Final standing
2008	4th out of 8	Semi-finalists
2009	1st out of 8	Semi-finalists
2010	5th out of 8	League stage
2011	10th out of 10	League stage
2012	1st out of 9	Playoffs
2013	9th out of 9	League stage
2014	8th out of 8	League stage
2015	7th out of 8	League stage
2016	6th out of 8	League stage
2017	6th out of 8	League stage
2018	8th out of 8	League stage
2019	3rd out of 8	Playoffs
2020	2nd out of 8	Runners-up
2021	1st out of 8	Playoffs
2022	5th out of 10	League stage
2023	9th out of 10	League stage
2024	6th out of 10	League stage
2025	5th out of 10	League stage
2026	6th out of 10	League stage

=== Champions League T20 ===
Year	League standing	Final standing
2009	6th out of 12	League stage
2010	DNQ	
2011	DNQ	
2012	3rd out of 14	Semi-finalists
2013	DNQ	
2014	DNQ	

== Statistics ==
=== Result summary ===
Summary of results
Years	Matches	Wins	Losses	No Result	Success Rate
2008	15	7	7	1	46.67%
2009	15	10	5	0	66.67%
2010	14	7	7	0	50.00%
2011	14	4	9	1	28.57%
2012	18	11	7	0	61.11%
2013	16	3	13	0	18.75%
2014	14	2	12	0	14.28%
2015	14	5	8	1	35.71%
2016	14	7	7	0	50.00%
2017	14	6	8	0	42.86%
2018	14	5	9	0	35.71%
2019	16	10	6	0	62.50%
2020	17	9	8	0	52.94%
2021	16	10	6	0	62.50%
2022	14	7	7	0	50.00%
2023	14	5	9	0	35.71%
2024	14	7	7	0	50.00%
2025	14	7	6	1	50.00%
2026	14	7	7	0	50.00%
Total	281	129	148	4	47.33%

=== Head to head ===
Opponent	Played	Won	Lost	Tied+W	Tied+L	Tied	No result	Win %
Chennai Super Kings	31	12	19	0	0	0	0	38.71
Gujarat Titans	5	3	2	0	0	0	0	60.00
Deccan Chargers	11	7	4	0	0	0	0	63.63
Gujarat Lions	4	3	1	0	0	0	0	75.00
Kochi Tuskers Kerala	2	1	1	0	0	0	0	50.00
Kolkata Knight Riders	34	15	18	1	0	0	0	44.11
Lucknow Super Giants	6	3	3	0	0	0	0	50.00
Mumbai Indians	36	16	20	0	0	0	0	44.44
Pune Warriors India	6	3	2	0	0	0	1	50.00
Punjab Kings	33	15	17	1	0	0	0	45.45
Rajasthan Royals	30	15	15	0	0	0	0	50.00
Rising Pune Supergiant	4	2	2	0	0	0	0	50.00
Royal Challengers Bengaluru	33	12	19	0	1	0	1	36.36
Sunrisers Hyderabad	25	11	13	1	0	0	0	44.00
Last updated: 17 April 2025

== Sponsors ==
=== Kit suppliers and shirt sponsors ===
Period	Kit supplier	Shirt sponsor (front)	Shirt sponsor (back)
2008–2009	Adidas	Hero Honda	Religare
2009–2010	Adidas	Hero Honda	Jetking
2010–2011	Adidas	Hero Honda	Idea
2011–2014	Adidas	Muthoot Group	Idea
2014–2015	Flying Machine	Quikr	Idea
2015–2016	Flying Machine	Daikin	Lux Cozi
2016–2018	Flying Machine	Daikin	Manforce
2018–2019	Flying Machine	Daikin	NatureFresh
2019–2020	Sqad Gear	Daikin	APL Apollo
2020–2022	Wrogn	JSW	EbixCash
2022–2023	Wrogn	JSW	Octa
2023–2024	Wrogn	JSW	DP World
2024–present	Puma	Hero FinCorp	DP World

== See also ==
- Delhi Capitals (WPL)
- Dubai Capitals
- Pretoria Capitals
