= 2013 Chennai Super Kings season =

Indian Premier League cricket team season

Chennai Super Kings
2013 season
- Coach: Stephen Fleming
- Captain: Mahendra Singh Dhoni
- Runners-up
- CLT20: Qualified
- Most runs: Mike Hussey (732)
- Most wickets: Dwayne Bravo (32)
- Most catches: Dwayne Bravo (12)
- Most wicket-keeping dismissals: MS Dhoni (12)

Chennai Super Kings (CSK) is a franchise cricket team based in Chennai, India, which plays in the Indian Premier League (IPL). They were one of the nine teams that competed in the 2013 Indian Premier League. They were captained for the sixth season in succession by Indian skipper Mahendra Singh Dhoni.

== Background ==
By the end of October 2012, all IPL teams were given an opportunity to trim their squad with which CSK retained 16 players of their 2012 squad. They released George Bailey, Doug Bollinger, Joginder Sharma, Suraj Randiv, Yo Mahesh, Abhinav Mukund, Scott Styris, Sudeep Tyagi, K Vasudevadas, G Vignesh from their squad.

== Pre-season player signings ==
Before the auction, coach Stephen Fleming hinted that the team is looking to boost the local bowling option and also the pace department. At the auction, the Super Kings did not bid for a single batsman. They picked up five bowlers instead, which Gurunath Meiyappan, who was part of the Super Kings auction side, said was their sole objective.

Dirk Nannes was their first buy, but their most surprising purchase was South Africa's bowling allrounder Chris Morris for $625,000. Soon after getting Morris, the Super Kings went after the Sri Lankan spinner Sachithra Senanayake too, but lost him to Kolkata Knight Riders. Towards the end of the auction they picked up Australian seamer Ben Laughlin, Sri Lankan spinner Akila Dananjaya and the West Indian quick Jason Holder, all at their respective base prices.

Post-auction, CSK first signed up the Indian U-19 all-rounder Baba Aparajith and also uncapped Tamil Nadu player Vijay Shankar. In a continuation of their auction strategy, Chennai Super Kings signed five Indian uncapped bowlers. The bowlers signed-up were UP duo of Imtiyaz Ahmed and Ankit Rajpoot, Haryana quick Mohit Sharma, Karnataka pacer Ronit More and Tamil Nadu left-arm spinner R Karthikeyan.

== Squad ==
Players with international caps before the start of the 2013 IPL season are listed in bold.

No.	Name	Nationality	Birth date	Batting style	Bowling style	Notes
Batsmen
03	**Suresh Raina**	India	27 November 1986 (aged 26)	Left-handed	Right-arm off break	Vice-captain
13	**Francois du Plessis**	South Africa	13 July 1984 (aged 28)	Right-handed	Right-arm leg break	Overseas
33	**Subramaniam Badrinath**	India	30 August 1980 (aged 32)	Right-handed	Right-arm off break	
48	**Michael Hussey**	Australia	27 May 1975 (aged 37)	Left-handed	Right-arm medium	Overseas
77	Anirudha Srikkanth	India	14 April 1987 (aged 25)	Right-handed	Right-arm off break	
All-rounders
02	**Chris Morris**	South Africa	30 April 1987 (aged 25)	Right-handed	Right-arm medium	Overseas
05	Baba Aparajith	India	8 July 1994 (aged 18)	Right-handed	Right-arm off break	
12	**Ravindra Jadeja**	India	6 December 1988 (aged 24)	Left-handed	Slow left arm orthodox	
26	Vijay Shankar	India	26 January 1991 (aged 22)	Right-handed	Right-arm off break	
47	**Dwayne Bravo**	Trinidad and Tobago	7 October 1983 (aged 29)	Right-handed	Right-arm medium-fast	Overseas
81	**Albie Morkel**	South Africa	10 June 1981 (aged 31)	Left-handed	Right arm medium-fast	Overseas
Wicket-keepers
06	**Wriddhiman Saha**	India	24 October 1984 (aged 28)	Right-handed	–	
07	**Mahendra Singh Dhoni**	India	7 July 1981 (aged 31)	Right-handed	Right-arm medium	Captain
Bowlers
01	R Karthikeyan	India	26 January 1993 (aged 20)	Right-handed	Slow left arm orthodox	
04	**Akila Dananjaya**	Sri Lanka	4 October 1993 (aged 19)	Left-handed	Right-arm off break	Overseas
18	Mohit Sharma	India	18 September 1988 (aged 24)	Right-handed	Right-arm medium-fast	
22	Ronit More	India	11 February 1992 (aged 21)	Right-handed	Right-arm medium-fast	
27	Shadab Jakati	India	27 November 1980 (aged 32)	Left-handed	Slow left arm orthodox	
28	**Ben Hilfenhaus**	Australia	15 March 1983 (aged 30)	Right-handed	Right arm fast-medium	Overseas
29	**Dirk Nannes**	Australia	16 May 1976 (aged 36)	Right-handed	Left-arm fast-medium	Overseas
43	Ankit Rajpoot	India	4 December 1993 (aged 19)	Right-handed	Right-arm medium-fast	
55	**Ben Laughlin**	Australia	3 October 1982 (aged 30)	Right-handed	Right-arm fast-medium	Overseas
63	Imtiyaz Ahmed	India	10 November 1985 (aged 27)	Right-handed	Right-arm fast-medium	
92	**Nuwan Kulasekara**	Sri Lanka	22 July 1982 (aged 30)	Right-handed	Right-arm fast-medium	Overseas
98	**Jason Holder**	Barbados	5 November 1991 (aged 21)	Right-handed	Right-arm medium-fast	Overseas
99	**Ravichandran Ashwin**	India	17 September 1986 (aged 26)	Right-handed	Right-arm off break	

== Indian Premier League ==
Match I: Super Kings started their season again with a loss, in their home ground, in a tight match against Mumbai Indians. Though the bowlers started restricting and take regular wickets, Pollard's onslaught helped Mumbai Indians reach 148. Super Kings batsmen stumbled through the chase with many of them falling for cheap shots. The skipper and captain of Chennai Super Kings Mahendra Singh Dhoni got the Chennai Super Kings back into the game by a scoring an amazing 51 of just 26 ball including 5 boundaries and 3 maximums and a strike rate of 196.15. He played superbly and was going for a maximum when he got out with Pollard taking the catch of MSD, once again proved the match winner for Mumbai Indians

Match II: In the second match at Mohali, CSK won over KXIP with an astounding 10 wicket win. Winning the toss and opting to bowl, CSK's bowlers were constantly taking the wickets and bowled out KXIP for 138. David Hussey and Gurkeerat Singh helped KXIP to stabilize in the middle overs until Ashwin and Bravo struck back. Michael Hussey and Murali Vijay started the chase in a slow and steady manner. Once they were settled Hussey's blows made the run chase too easy with CSK winning it with 10 wickets and 16 balls to spare. Vijay playing the second fiddle reached his half century in run a ball. Mike Hussey was awarded Man of the Match for his clean-hit 86 off 54 balls.

Match III: CSK's third match was one of the best matches in all of the IPL so far. the Arch-rivals of CSK, RCB made 165 with the help of Kohli's 58 and AB De Villiers' cracking 64 off 32 balls. Batting CSK lost its openers cheaply at a poor runrate. Badrinath and Raina doing the repairs at the middle stages, Dhoni and Jadeja tweaking in the pre-last stages, CSK was made to get 29 runs from last 11 balls when Dhoni got out. With short cameos from Bravo and Morris, it was all down to Ravindra Jadeja to score 2 runs in the last ball. Off which, he gave a catch to the third man. Kohli was rejoicing the win and seeing the umpire giving the no-ball, it was confirmed a CSK's win. Post Match, many Jadeja's jokes started to revolve the Internet. MSD tweeted "When you give Sir Ravindra Jadeja one ball to get 2 runs he will win it with one ball to spare !!"

Match IV: Playing their 3rd game at home and facing the Pune Warriors India, CSK played a disappointing game. CSK brought in Anirudha and Albie Morkel in the team for Mike Hussey and Mohit Sharma which was a controversial substitution. Pune dominated from the first with the power hitting of Aaron Finch and late surge from Steven Smith. Pune reached a competitive 159 and CSK lost the game by 24 runs.

Match V: CSK played against the Delhi Daredevils who are struggling to record their first win this season. CSK chose to bat first after winning the toss and set a pretty solid target of 170. Michael Hussey and Mahendra Singh Dhoni played their game with good support from Suresh Raina. DD started their wobbly innings with David Warner cheaply gone for 1 run and wickets continued to fall in short intervals. DD were dismissed for 83 runs. DD required 9 wins from their remaining 10 matches to improve their standing in the tournament.

Match VI: CSK played their 6th match against the struggling Kolkata Knight Riders. KKR captain Gautam Gambhir won the toss and elected to bat. Skipper Gautam Gambhir and all-rounder Yusuf Pathan gave them a brisk start of 25 off 19 and 25 off 22 respectively. But soon Morris stuck for his team and an excellent catch by Hussey to get rid of Gautam Gambhir. Soon Yusuf pathan also was run-out by a quick throw by Bravo. In the end of the first innings KKR could only manage 119/6 in their 20 overs. CSK started off well but soon lost wickets at regular intervals. M. Hussey played a vital innings of 40 off 51 balls though it was slow in the context of the game . With 48 to win from 24, Ravindra Jadeja arrived at the crease and struck an awesome cameo of 36 off just 14 delivered the goods and took CSK past the line. CSK in the end won the encounter by 5 wickets and 5 balls to spare.

Match VII: Playing their 4th match in their home ground, CSK once again lost the toss was asked to bowl by the Rajasthan Royals captain Rahul Dravid. Batting first, RR off to a flier with Watson going all guns blazing. Though one team wickets were sliding, RR reached 185 helped by a magnificent century by Watson and some late power-hits by Stuart Binny. CSK while chasing lost Vijay cheaply once again within the Powerplays. With some fluent hits by Michael Hussey and heavy shots by RainaRaina consolidating the middle overs, CSK reached 100 in the 11th over. With Raina getting out for 55, Hussey going for well played 88 and Jadeja getting out in the next ball, CSK once again went into the danger zone. However MSD's cameo fireworks and Dwayne Bravo's last over heroics helped CSK win the match with a ball to spare. Hussey was awarded MoM for his match-winning 88 runs off 51 balls.

Match VIII: The 34th match of IPL6 witnessed SRH batting first and posting a modest total of 159 with the help of Shikhar Dhawan's well paced 63 and Aashish Reddy's late surge 36. In response, CSK's top order responded well with all contributing and Dhoni going berserk in the final overs. Karan Sharma's maiden in the final overs gave the much needed pressure but Dhoni emphatically pulled the match easily. From 0 off 6 balls, he surged to 67 off 37 balls thus winning the MoM unanimously.

Match IX: In the reminiscent of the last year finals, Current Champions Kolkata Knight Riders faced current runners up CSK in the Chepauk Stadium for the 38th match of IPL 6. Batting first CSK once again showed its batting strength with Hussey and Newcomer Saha smashing 100 in the 10th over. With heavy top order hitting from Saha, Raina and Hussey, CSK reached 200. KKR's innings featured some glimpse of last year finals with Bisla going hammer and tonks at the CSK Bowlers'. With some intelligent and tight bowling from Morris and Bravo's 19th and 20th over, CSK won the game convincingly. Hussey's master class 95 with an astonishing strike rate of 161 earned him the MoM once again.

=== Match log ===
No.	Date	Opponent	Venue	Result	Scorecard
1	6 April 2013	Mumbai Indians	Chennai	Lost by 9 runs	Scorecard
2	10 April 2013	Kings XI Punjab	Mohali	Won by 10 wickets, MoM – Mike Hussey 86* (54)	Scorecard
3	13 April 2013	Royal Challengers Bangalore	Chennai	Won by 4 wickets, MoM – Ravindra Jadeja 38* (20)	Scorecard
4	15 April 2013	Pune Warriors India	Chennai	Lost by 24 runs	Scorecard
5	18 April 2013	Delhi Daredevils	New Delhi	Won by 86 runs, MoM – Mike Hussey 65* (50)	Scorecard
6	20 April 2013	Kolkata Knight Riders	Kolkata	Won by 4 wickets, MoM - Ravindra Jadeja 36* (14) & 3/20	Scorecard
7	22 April 2013	Rajasthan Royals	Chennai	Won by 5 wickets, MoM – Mike Hussey 88 (51)	Scorecard
8	25 April 2013	Sunrisers Hyderabad	Chennai	Won by 5 wickets, MoM – Mahendra Singh Dhoni 67* (37)	Scorecard
9	28 April 2013	Kolkata Knight Riders	Chennai	Won by 14 runs, MoM – Mike Hussey 95 (59)	Scorecard
10	30 April 2013	Pune Warriors India	Pune	Won by 37 runs; MoM – Mahendra Singh Dhoni 45* (16)	Scorecard
11	2 May 2013	Kings XI Punjab	Chennai	Won by 15 runs; MoM - Suresh Raina 100* (53)	Scorecard
12	5 May 2013	Mumbai Indians	Mumbai	Lost by 60 runs	Scorecard
13	8 May 2013	Sunrisers Hyderabad	Hyderabad	Won by 77 runs; MoM - Suresh Raina 99* (52) & 1/4 (1 Over)	Scorecard
14	12 May 2013	Rajasthan Royals	Jaipur	Lost by 5 wickets	Scorecard
15	14 May 2013	Delhi Daredevils	Chennai	Won by 33 runs; MoM – Mahendra Singh Dhoni 58* (35)	Scorecard
16	18 May 2013	Royal Challengers Bangalore	Bengaluru	Lost by 24 runs	Scorecard
17	21 May 2013	Mumbai Indians (Qualifier #1)	New Delhi	Won by 48 runs, MoM – Mike Hussey 86* (58)	Scorecard
18	26 May 2013	Mumbai Indians (Finals)	Kolkata	Lost by 23 runs	Scorecard
