= 2023 Mumbai Indians season =

Indian Premier League cricket team season

Mumbai Indians
2023 season
- Coach: Mark Boucher
- Captain: Rohit Sharma
- Ground(s): Wankhede Stadium, Mumbai
- 2023 Indian Premier League: 4th
- Most runs: Suryakumar Yadav (605)
- Most wickets: Piyush Chawla (22)
- Most catches: Tim David (10)
- Most wicket-keeping dismissals: Ishan Kishan (13)

The 2023 season of the Indian Premier League saw Mumbai Indians plays its 16th season.

Having finished the 2022 season in the bottom spot on the table, the team qualified for the playoffs in 2023.

== Background ==
The franchise retained several players ahead of the 2023 mini-auction. These included the list as below.

- Rohit Sharma
- Ishan Kishan
- Suryakumar Yadav
- Jasprit Bumrah
- Hritik Shokeen
- Arjun Tendulkar
- Tim David
- Kumar Kartikeya
- Dewald Brevis
- Ramandeep Singh
- Tilak Varma
- Jofra Archer
- Mohd. Arshad Khan
- Akash Madhwal
- Tristan Stubbs
- Jason Behrendorff

=== Players released ===
- Kieron Pollard (Retired)
- Anmolpreet Singh
- Aryan Juyal
- Basil Thampi
- Daniel Sams
- Fabian Allen
- Jaydev Unadkat
- Mayank Markande
- Murugan Ashwin
- Rahul Buddhi
- Riley Meredith
- Sanjay Yadav
- Tymal Mills

=== Players signed ===
- Cameron Green
- Duan Jansen
- Nehal Wadhera
- Shams Mulani
- Piyush Chawla
- Raghav Goyal
- Jhye Richardson
- Vishnu Vinod

== Season ==
Despite the absence of experienced bowlers in the team, and with Jasprit Bumrah injured, the emergence of Akash Madhwal, who took a five-wicket haul in the eliminator match was one of the positives for the team.

The team started slowly, losing two of its first three matches, but was able to finish 4th in the group stage, qualifying for the playoffs. They beat Lucknow Super Giants in the eliminator, but lost to Gujarat Titans in the second playoff match.

Suryakumar Yadav was the standout talent with the bat accumulating 605 runs, whilst Piyush Chawla took 22 wickets.
