= 2022 Mumbai Indians season =

Indian Premier League cricket team season

Mumbai Indians
2022 season
- Coach: Mahela Jayawardene
- Captain: Rohit Sharma
- Ground(s): Wankhede Stadium, Mumbai
- 2022 Indian Premier League: 10th
- Most runs: Ishan Kishan (418)
- Most wickets: Jasprit Bumrah (15)
- Most catches: Tilak Varma (10)
- Most wicket-keeping dismissals: Ishan Kishan (13)

The 2022 season was the 15th season for the Indian Premier League franchise Mumbai Indians. They were one of the ten teams to compete in the league.

== Background ==
The franchise retained four players ahead of the 2022 mega-auction.

=== Retained ===
- Rohit Sharma
- Suryakumar Yadav
- Jasprit Bumrah
- Kieron Pollard

=== Released ===
- Aditya Tare
- Anmolpreet Singh
- Anukul Roy
- Dhawal Kulkarni
- Hardik Pandya
- Ishan Kishan
- Jayant Yadav
- Krunal Pandya
- Quinton de Kock
- Rahul Chahar
- Trent Boult
- Chris Lynn
- Saurabh Tiwary
- Mohsin Khan
- Piyush Chawla
- James Neesham
- Marco Jansen
- Yudhvir Charak
- Nathan Coulter-Nile
- Adam Milne
- Arjun Tendulkar

== Squad ==
- Players with international caps are listed in **bold**.
- Squad strength: 24 (16 - Indian, 8 - overseas)

No.	Name	Nationality	Birth date	Batting style	Bowling style	Year signed	Salary	Notes
Captain
45	**Rohit Sharma**	India	30 April 1987 (aged 34)	Right-handed	Right-arm off break	2022	₹16 crore (US$1.7 million)	Captain
Batters
8	**Tim David**	Australia	16 March 1996 (aged 26)	Right-handed	Right-arm off break	2022	₹8.25 crore (US$860,000)	Overseas
9	Tilak Varma	India	8 November 2002 (aged 19)	Left-handed	Right-arm off break	2022	₹1.7 crore (US$180,000)	
28	Anmolpreet Singh	India	28 March 1998 (aged 23)	Right-handed	Right-arm off break	2022	₹20 lakh (US$21,000)	
33	Rahul Buddhi	India	20 September 1997 (aged 24)	Left-handed	Right-arm off break	2022	₹20 lakh (US$21,000)	
63	**Suryakumar Yadav**	India	14 September 1990 (aged 31)	Right-handed	Right-arm medium	2022	₹8 crore (US$830,000)	
All Rounders
4	Sanjay Yadav	India	10 May 1995 (aged 26)	Left-handed	Slow left-arm orthodox	2022	₹50 lakh (US$52,000)	
13	Ramandeep Singh	India	13 April 1997 (aged 24)	Right-handed	Right-arm medium	2022	₹20 lakh (US$21,000)	
17	Dewald Brevis	South Africa	29 April 2003 (aged 18)	Right-handed	Right-arm leg break	2022	₹3 crore (US$310,000)	Overseas
55	**Kieron Pollard**	West Indies	12 May 1987 (aged 34)	Right-handed	Right-arm medium-fast	2022	₹6 crore (US$630,000)	Overseas And vice captain
95	**Daniel Sams**	Australia	27 October 1992 (aged 29)	Right-handed	Left-arm medium-fast	2022	₹2.6 crore (US$270,000)	Overseas
97	**Fabian Allen**	West Indies	7 May 1995 (aged 26)	Right-handed	Slow left-arm orthodox	2022	₹75 lakh (US$78,000)	Overseas
Wicket-keepers
12	Tristan Stubbs	South Africa	14 August 2000 (aged 21)	Right-handed	Right arm off break	2022	₹20 lakh (US$21,000)	Overseas, replacement for Tymal Mills
23	**Ishan Kishan**	India	18 July 1998 (aged 23)	Left-handed	Left-arm medium	2022	₹15.25 crore (US$1.6 million)	
54	Aryan Juyal	India	11 November 2001 (aged 20)	Right-handed	-	2022	₹20 lakh (US$21,000)	
Fast Bowlers
21	**Riley Meredith**	Australia	21 June 1996 (aged 25)	Right-handed	Right-arm fast	2022	₹1 crore (US$100,000)	Overseas
30	Basil Thampi	India	11 September 1993 (aged 28)	Right-handed	Right-arm fast-medium	2022	₹30 lakh (US$31,000)	
56	**Tymal Mills**	England	12 August 1992 (aged 29)	Right-handed	Left-arm fast	2022	₹1.5 crore (US$160,000)	Overseas
77	**Jaydev Unadkat**	India	18 October 1991 (aged 30)	Right-handed	Left-arm fast-medium	2022	₹1.3 crore (US$140,000)	
93	**Jasprit Bumrah**	India	6 December 1993 (aged 28)	Right-handed	Right-arm fast-medium	2022	₹12 crore (US$1.3 million)	
	**Jofra Archer**	England	1 April 1995 (aged 26)	Right-handed	Right-arm fast	2022	₹8 crore (US$830,000)	Overseas
	Arjun Tendulkar	India	24 September 1999 (aged 22)	Left-handed	Left-arm medium-fast	2022	₹30 lakh (US$31,000)	
	Arshad Khan	India	4 September 1999 (aged 22)	Left-handed	Left-arm medium	2022	₹20 lakh (US$21,000)	
Spin Bowlers
11	**Mayank Markande**	India	11 November 1997 (aged 24)	Right-handed	Right-arm leg-break	2022	₹65 lakh (US$68,000)	
26	Kumar Kartikeya	India	26 December 1997 (aged 24)	Right-handed	Slow left arm orthodox	2022	₹20 lakh (US$21,000)	Replacement for Arshad Khan
27	Hrithik Shokeen	India	14 August 2000 (aged 21)	Right-handed	Right-arm off break	2022	₹20 lakh (US$21,000)	
89	Murugan Ashwin	India	8 September 1990 (aged 31)	Right-handed	Right-arm leg-break	2022	₹1.6 crore (US$170,000)	
Source:MI Players

== Administration and support staff ==
Position	Name
Team manager	Rahul Sanghvi
Director of cricket operations	Zaheer Khan
Head coach	Mahela Jayawardene
Batting coach	Robin Singh
Batting mentor	Sachin Tendulkar
Bowling coach	Shane Bond
Fielding coach	James Pamment
Head of talent scouting	John Wright
Source:MI Staff

== Kit manufacturers and sponsors ==
Kit manufacturer	Shirt sponsor (chest)	Shirt sponsor (back)	Chest branding
Performax	Slice	DHL	Marriott Bonvey
Source :

T20 uniform

== Teams and standings ==
=== Points table ===
Pos	Grp	Team	Pld	W	L	NR	Pts	NRR	Qualification
1	B	Gujarat Titans (C)	14	10	4	0	20	0.316	Advanced to Qualifier 1
2	A	Rajasthan Royals (R)	14	9	5	0	18	0.298	Advanced to Qualifier 1
3	A	Lucknow Super Giants (4th)	14	9	5	0	18	0.251	Advanced to Eliminator
4	B	Royal Challengers Bangalore (3rd)	14	8	6	0	16	−0.253	Advanced to Eliminator
5	A	Delhi Capitals	14	7	7	0	14	0.204	
6	B	Punjab Kings	14	7	7	0	14	0.126	
7	A	Kolkata Knight Riders	14	6	8	0	12	0.146	
8	B	Sunrisers Hyderabad	14	6	8	0	12	−0.379	
9	B	Chennai Super Kings	14	4	10	0	8	−0.203	
10	A	Mumbai Indians	14	4	10	0	8	−0.506	

Source: IPLT20.com
(C) Champions; (R) Runners-up
The four top-ranked teams qualified for the playoffs.

== Group fixtures ==
Match 2
27 March 2022
15:30 (D/N)
Scorecard

Mumbai Indians; 177/5 (20 overs)	v	Delhi Capitals; 179/6 (18.2 overs)
Ishan Kishan 81* (48); Kuldeep Yadav 3/18 (4 overs)		Lalit Yadav 48* (38); Basil Thampi 3/35 (4 overs)

Delhi Capitals won by 4 wickets
Brabourne Stadium, Mumbai
Umpires: Saiyed Khalid (Ind) and Rod Tucker (Aus)
Player of the match: Kuldeep Yadav (Delhi Capitals)

- Delhi Capitals won the toss and elected to field.

Match 9
2 April 2022
15:30 (D/N)
Scorecard

Rajasthan Royals; 193/8 (20 overs)	v	Mumbai Indians; 170/8 (20 overs)
Jos Buttler 100 (68); Jasprit Bumrah 3/17 (4 overs)		Ishan Kishan 54 (43); Yuzvendra Chahal 2/26 (4 overs)

Rajasthan Royals won by 23 runs
DY Patil Stadium, Navi Mumbai
Umpires: Nitin Menon (Ind) and Pashchim Pathak (Ind)
Player of the match: Jos Buttler (Rajasthan Royals)

- Mumbai Indians won the toss and elected to field.

Match 14
6 April 2022
19:30 (N)
Scorecard

Mumbai Indians; 161/4 (20 overs)	v	Kolkata Knight Riders; 162/5 (16 overs)
Suryakumar Yadav 52 (36); Pat Cummins 2/49 (4 overs)		Pat Cummins 56* (15); Murugan Ashwin 2/25 (3 overs)

Kolkata Knight Riders won by 5 wickets
MCA International Stadium, Pune
Umpires: K. N. Ananthapadmanabhan (Ind) and Bruce Oxenford (Aus)
Player of the match: Pat Cummins (Kolkata Knight Riders)

- Kolkata Knight Riders won the toss and elected to field.
- Pat Cummins (Kolkata Knight Riders) scored the joint-fastest half-century in the IPL (14 balls).

Match 18
9 April 2022
19:30 (N)
Scorecard

Mumbai Indians; 151/6 (20 overs)	v	Royal Challengers Bangalore; 152/3 (18.3 overs)
Suryakumar Yadav 68* (37); Harshal Patel 2/23 (4 overs)		Anuj Rawat 66 (47); Dewald Brevis 1/8 (0.3 overs)

Royal Challengers Bangalore won by 7 wickets
MCA International Stadium, Pune
Umpires: K. N. Ananthapadmanabhan (Ind) and Bruce Oxenford (Aus)
Player of the match: Anuj Rawat (Royal Challengers Bangalore)

- Royal Challengers Bangalore won the toss and elected to field.

Match 23
13 April 2022
19:30 (N)
Scorecard

Punjab Kings; 198/5 (20 overs)	v	Mumbai Indians; 186/9 (20 overs)
Shikhar Dhawan 70 (50); Basil Thampi 2/47 (4 overs)		Dewald Brevis 49 (25); Odean Smith 4/30 (3 overs)

Punjab Kings won by 12 runs
MCA International Stadium, Pune
Umpires: Ulhas Gandhe (Ind) and Bruce Oxenford (Aus)
Player of the match: Mayank Agarwal (Punjab Kings)

- Mumbai Indians won the toss and elected to field.

Match 26
16 April 2022
15:30 (D/N)
Scorecard

Lucknow Super Giants; 199/4 (20 overs)	v	Mumbai Indians; 181/9 (20 overs)
KL Rahul 103* (60); Jaydev Unadkat 2/32 (4 overs)		Suryakumar Yadav 37 (27); Avesh Khan 3/30 (4 overs)

Lucknow Super Giants won by 18 runs
Brabourne Stadium, Mumbai
Umpires: Anil Chaudhary (Ind) and Nikhil Patwardhan (Ind)
Player of the match: KL Rahul (Lucknow Super Giants)

- Mumbai Indians won the toss and elected to field.

Match 33
21 April 2022
19:30 (N)
Scorecard

Mumbai Indians; 155/7 (20 overs)	v	Chennai Super Kings; 156/7 (20 overs)
Tilak Varma 51* (43); Mukesh Choudhary 3/19 (3 overs)		Ambati Rayudu 40 (35); Daniel Sams 4/30 (4 overs)

Chennai Super Kings won by 3 wickets
DY Patil Stadium, Navi Mumbai
Umpires: Ulhas Gandhe (Ind) and Bruce Oxenford (Aus)
Player of the match: Mukesh Choudhary (Chennai Super Kings)

- Chennai Super Kings won the toss and elected to field.
- Hrithik Shokeen (Mumbai Indians) made his T20 debut.

Match 37
24 April 2022
19:30 (N)
Scorecard

Lucknow Super Giants; 168/6 (20 overs)	v	Mumbai Indians; 132/8 (20 overs)
KL Rahul 103* (62); Kieron Pollard 2/8 (2 overs)		Rohit Sharma 39 (31); Krunal Pandya 3/19 (4 overs)

Lucknow Super Giants won by 36 runs
Wankhede Stadium, Mumbai
Umpires: Marais Erasmus (SA) and Saiyed Khalid (Ind)
Player of the match: KL Rahul (Lucknow Super Giants)

- Mumbai Indians won the toss and elected to field.

Match 44
30 April 2022
19:30 (N)
Scorecard

Rajasthan Royals; 158/6 (20 overs)	v	Mumbai Indians; 161/5 (19.2 overs)
Jos Buttler 67 (52); Riley Meredith 2/24 (4 overs)		Suryakumar Yadav 51 (39); Ravichandran Ashwin 1/21 (4 overs)

Mumbai Indians won by 5 wickets
DY Patil Stadium, Navi Mumbai
Umpires: Yeshwant Barde (Ind) and Bruce Oxenford (Aus)
Player of the match: Suryakumar Yadav (Mumbai Indians)

- Mumbai Indians won the toss and elected to field.

Match 51
6 May 2022
19:30 (N)
Scorecard

Mumbai Indians; 177/6 (20 overs)	v	Gujarat Titans; 172/5 (20 overs)
Ishan Kishan 45 (29); Rashid Khan 2/24 (4 overs)		Wriddhiman Saha 55 (40); Murugan Ashwin 2/29 (4 overs)

Mumbai Indians won by 5 runs
Brabourne Stadium, Mumbai
Umpires: Sadashiv Iyer (Ind) and Jayaraman Madanagopal (Ind)
Player of the match: Tim David (Mumbai Indians)

- Gujarat Titans won the toss and elected to field.

Match 56
9 May 2022
19:30 (N)
Scorecard

Kolkata Knight Riders; 165/9 (20 overs)	v	Mumbai Indians; 113 (17.3 overs)
Venkatesh Iyer 43 (24); Jasprit Bumrah 5/10 (4 overs)		Ishan Kishan 51 (43); Pat Cummins 3/22 (4 overs)

Kolkata Knight Riders won by 52 runs
DY Patil Stadium, Navi Mumbai
Umpires: Sadashiv Iyer (Ind) and Bruce Oxenford (Aus)
Player of the match: Jasprit Bumrah (Mumbai Indians)

- Mumbai Indians won the toss and elected to field.

Match 59
12 May 2022
19:30 (N)
Scorecard

Chennai Super Kings; 97 (16 overs)	v	Mumbai Indians; 103/5 (14.5 overs)
MS Dhoni 36* (33); Daniel Sams 3/16 (4 overs)		Tilak Varma 34* (32); Mukesh Choudhary 3/23 (4 overs)

Mumbai Indians won by 5 wickets
Wankhede Stadium, Mumbai
Umpires: Chris Gaffaney (NZ) and Chirra Ravikanthreddy (Ind)
Player of the match: Daniel Sams (Mumbai Indians)

- Mumbai Indians won the toss and elected to field.
- Chennai Super Kings were eliminated as a result of this match.

Match 65
17 May 2022
19:30 (N)
Scorecard

Sunrisers Hyderabad; 193/6 (20 overs)	v	Mumbai Indians; 190/7 (20 overs)
Rahul Tripathi 76 (44); Ramandeep Singh 3/20 (3 overs)		Rohit Sharma 48 (36); Umran Malik 3/23 (3 overs)

Sunrisers Hyderabad won by 3 runs
Wankhede Stadium, Mumbai
Umpires: Chris Gaffaney (NZ) and Nitin Pandit (Ind)
Player of the match: Rahul Tripathi (Sunrisers Hyderabad)

- Mumbai Indians won the toss and elected to field.

Match 69
21 May 2022
19:30 (N)
Scorecard

Delhi Capitals; 159/7 (20 overs)	v	Mumbai Indians; 160/5 (19.1 overs)
Rovman Powell 43 (34); Jasprit Bumrah 3/25 (4 overs)		Ishan Kishan 48 (35); Shardul Thakur 2/32 (3 overs)

Mumbai Indians won by 5 wickets
Wankhede Stadium, Mumbai
Umpires: Nitin Menon (Ind) and Tapan Sharma (Ind)
Player of the match: Jasprit Bumrah (Mumbai Indians)

- Mumbai Indians won the toss and elected to field.
- Royal Challengers Bangalore qualified for the playoffs and Delhi Capitals were eliminated as a result of this match.

== Statistics ==
=== Most runs ===
No.	Name	Match	Inns	NO	Runs	HS	Ave.	BF	SR	100s	50s	0	4s	6s
1	Ishan Kishan	14	14	1	418	81*	32.15	348	120.11	0	3	1	45	11
2	Tilak Varma	14	14	3	397	61	36.09	303	131.02	0	2	1	29	16
3	Suryakumar Yadav	8	8	1	303	68*	43.28	208	145.67	0	3	0	23	16
4	Rohit Sharma	14	14	0	268	48	19.14	223	120.17	0	0	1	28	13
5	Tim David	8	8	3	186	46	37.20	86	216.27	0	0	0	12	16
6	Dewald Brevis	7	7	0	161	49	23.00	113	142.27	0	0	0	14	11
7	Kieron Pollard	11	11	1	144	25	14.40	134	107.46	0	0	1	6	9
8	Jaydev Unadkat	5	5	2	59	19*	19.67	37	159.45	0	0	0	4	3
9	Ramandeep Singh	5	4	2	45	14*	22.50	40	112.50	0	0	0	3	1
10	Hrithik Shokeen	5	3	1	43	25	21.50	48	89.58	0	0	1	5	0

=== Most wickets ===
No.	Name	Match	Inns	Overs	Maidens	Runs	Wickets	BBI	Ave.	Econ.	SR	4W	5W
1	Jasprit Bumrah	14	14	53.2	2	383	15	5/10	25.53	7.18	21.3	0	1
2	Daniel Sams	11	11	42.0	0	370	13	4/30	28.46	8.80	19.3	1	0
3	Murugan Ashwin	8	8	29.0	0	228	9	2/14	25.33	7.86	19.3	0	0
4	Riley Meredith	8	8	28.0	0	236	8	2/24	29.50	8.42	21.0	0	0
5	Ramandeep Singh	5	3	6.0	0	54	6	3/20	9.00	9.00	6.00	0	0
5	Jaydev Unadkat	5	5	20.0	0	190	6	2/32	31.66	9.50	20.00	0	0
5	Tymal Mills	5	5	17.0	0	190	6	3/35	31.66	11.17	17.00	0	0
