= 2024 Mumbai Indians season =

2024 Indian Premier League cricket team

Mumbai Indians
2024 season
- Coach: Mark Boucher
- Captain: Hardik Pandya
- Ground(s): Wankhede Stadium, Mumbai
- IPL League: Finished at last place
- Most runs: Rohit Sharma (417)
- Most wickets: Jasprit Bumrah (20)
- Most catches: Tilak Varma (9)
- Most wicket-keeping dismissals: Ishan Kishan (9)

The 2024 season was the 17th season for the Indian Premier League franchise Mumbai Indians. They were one of the ten teams competed in the 2024 Indian Premier League. They finished at the 3rd place in previous season after losing the Qualifier 2 to Gujarat Titans.

Ahead of the 2024 season, Hardik Pandya was traded from Gujarat Titans and appointed as the captain. (Note: Ahead of the 2024 auction, Hardik Pandya was traded from Gujarat Titans to Mumbai.) After their 8th loss on 3 May 2024, Mumbai became the first team to be eliminated from the 2024 Indian Premier League. They finished the League stage at the last place with 4 wins and 10 losses, garnering 8 points.

The Mumbai Indians drew an average home attendance of 31,577 in the IPL in 2024.

== Squad ==
- Players with international caps are listed in **bold**.
- Ages are as of 22 Match 2024, the date of the first match in the competition

No.	Name	Nationality	Birth date	Batting style	Bowling style	Year signed	Salary	Notes
Captain
33	**Hardik Pandya**	India	11 October 1993 (aged 30)	Right-handed	Right-arm medium-fast	2024	₹15 crore (US$1.8 million)	Traded
Batters
45	**Rohit Sharma**	India	30 April 1987 (aged 36)	Right-handed	Right-arm off break	2011	₹16 crore (US$1.9 million)	
63	**Suryakumar Yadav**	India	14 September 1990 (aged 33)	Right-handed	Right-arm medium	2018	₹8 crore (US$950,000)	
8	**Tim David**	Australia	16 March 1996 (aged 28)	Right-handed	Right-arm off break	2022	₹8.25 crore (US$980,000)	Overseas
28	Naman Dhir	India	31 December 1999 (aged 24)	Right-handed	Right-arm off break	2024	₹20 lakh (US$24,000)	
19	Nehal Wadhera	India	4 September 2000 (aged 23)	Left-handed	Right-arm leg break	2023	₹20 lakh (US$24,000)	
Wicket-keepers
4	Vishnu Vinod	India	2 December 1993 (aged 30)	Right-handed	–	2022	₹20 lakh (US$24,000)	Withdrew (Note: Harvik Desai replaced Vishnu Vinod, after the latter withdrew due to Forearm injury.)
23	**Ishan Kishan**	India	18 July 1998 (aged 25)	Left-handed	–	2022	₹15.25 crore (US$1.8 million)	
–	Harvik Desai	India	4 October 1999 (aged 24)	Right-handed	–	2024	₹20 lakh (US$24,000)	Replacement
All-rounders
9	**Tilak Varma**	India	8 November 2002 (aged 21)	Left-handed	Right-arm off break	2022	₹1.7 crore (US$200,000)	
17	**Dewald Brevis**	South Africa	29 April 2003 (aged 20)	Right-handed	Right-arm leg break	2022	₹3 crore (US$350,000)	Overseas
7	**Mohammad Nabi**	Afghanistan	1 January 1985 (aged 39)	Right-handed	Right-arm off break	2024	₹1.5 crore (US$180,000)	Overseas
24	**Piyush Chawla**	India	24 December 1988 (aged 35)	Left-handed	Right-arm leg break	2023	₹50 lakh (US$59,000)	
48	**Romario Shepherd**	West Indies	26 November 1994 (aged 29)	Right-handed	Right arm fast medium	2024	₹50 lakh (US$59,000)	Overseas; Traded (Note: Ahead of the 2024 auction, Romario Shepherd was traded from Lucknow Super Giants to Mumbai.)
13	Shams Mulani	India	13 March 1997 (aged 27)	Left-handed	Left-arm orthodox	2023	₹20 lakh (US$24,000)	
37	Shreyas Gopal	India	4 September 1993 (aged 30)	Right-handed	Right-arm leg break	2024	₹20 lakh (US$24,000)	
47	Anshul Kamboj	India	6 December 2000 (aged 23)	Right-handed	Right-arm medium	2024	₹20 lakh (US$24,000)	
–	Shivalik Sharma	India	28 November 1998 (aged 25)	Left-handed	Right-arm leg break	2024	₹20 lakh (US$24,000)	
Pace bowlers
5	**Jason Behrendorff**	Australia	20 April 1990 (aged 33)	Left-handed	Left-arm fast-medium	2023	₹75 lakh (US$89,000)	Overseas; Withdrew (Note: Luke Wood replaced Jason Behrendorff, after the latter withdrew due to Injury.)
99	Arjun Tendulkar	India	24 September 1999 (aged 24)	Left-handed	Left-arm medium-fast	2021	₹30 lakh (US$35,000)	
93	**Jasprit Bumrah**	India	6 December 1993 (aged 30)	Right-handed	Right-arm fast	2013	₹12 crore (US$1.4 million)	
25	Akash Madhwal	India	25 November 1993 (aged 30)	Right-handed	Right-arm medium-fast	2022	₹20 lakh (US$24,000)	
62	**Gerald Coetzee**	South Africa	2 October 2000 (aged 23)	Right-handed	Right-arm fast	2024	₹5 crore (US$590,000)	Overseas
–	**Dilshan Madushanka**	Sri Lanka	18 September 2000 (aged 23)	Right-handed	Left-arm fast-medium	2024	₹4.6 crore (US$540,000)	Overseas; Withdrew (Note: Kwena Maphaka replaced Dilshan Madushanka, after the latter withdrew due to Injury.)
53	**Nuwan Thushara**	Sri Lanka	6 August 1994 (aged 29)	Right-handed	Right-arm medium-fast	2024	₹4.8 crore (US$570,000)	Overseas
14	**Luke Wood**	England	2 August 1995 (aged 28)	Left-handed	Left-arm fast-medium	2024	₹50 lakh (US$59,000)	Overseas; Replacement
11	Kwena Maphaka	South Africa	8 April 2006 (aged 17)	Left-handed	Left-arm medium	2024	₹50 lakh (US$59,000)	Overseas; Replacement
Spin bowlers
26	Kumar Kartikeya	India	26 December 1997 (aged 26)	Right-handed	Left-arm spinner	2022	₹20 lakh (US$24,000)	

- Source: ESPNcricinfo

== Administration and support staff ==
Position	Name
Team manager	Prashant Jangam
Head coach	Mark Boucher
Batting coach	Kieron Pollard
Bowling coach	Lasith Malinga
Fielding coach	James Pamment

== League stage ==
=== Points table ===
Pos	Grp	Team	Pld	W	L	NR	Pts	NRR	Qualification
1	A	Kolkata Knight Riders (C)	14	9	3	2	20	1.428	Advanced to Qualifier 1
2	B	Sunrisers Hyderabad (R)	14	8	5	1	17	0.414	Advanced to Qualifier 1
3	A	Rajasthan Royals (3rd)	14	8	5	1	17	0.273	Advanced to Eliminator
4	B	Royal Challengers Bengaluru (4th)	14	7	7	0	14	0.459	Advanced to Eliminator
5	B	Chennai Super Kings	14	7	7	0	14	0.392	Eliminated
6	A	Delhi Capitals	14	7	7	0	14	−0.377	Eliminated
7	A	Lucknow Super Giants	14	7	7	0	14	−0.667	Eliminated
8	B	Gujarat Titans	14	5	7	2	12	−1.063	Eliminated
9	B	Punjab Kings	14	5	9	0	10	−0.353	Eliminated
10	A	Mumbai Indians	14	4	10	0	8	−0.318	Eliminated

Source: ESPNcricinfo
(C) Champions; (R) Runners-up

=== League progression ===
League progression
Team	Group matches														Playoffs		
Team	1	2	3	4	5	6	7	8	9	10	11	12	13	14	Q1/E	Q2	F
Mumbai Indians	0	0	0	2	4	4	6	6	6	6	6	8	8	8			

Win	Loss	No result

- Note: The total points at the end of each group match are listed.
- Note: Click on the points (group matches) or W/L (playoffs) to see the match summary.

=== Fixtures and results ===
Match 5
24 March 2024
19:30 (N)
Scorecard

(H) Gujarat Titans; 168/6 (20 overs)	v	Mumbai Indians; 162/9 (20 overs)
Sai Sudharsan 45 (39); Jasprit Bumrah 3/14 (4 overs)		Dewald Brevis 46 (38); Spencer Johnson 2/25 (2 overs)

Gujarat Titans won by 6 runs
Narendra Modi Stadium, Ahmedabad
Umpires: Vineet Kulkarni (Ind) and Virender Sharma (Ind)
Player of the match: Sai Sudharsan (Gujarat Titans)

- Mumbai Indians won the toss and elected to field.

Match 8
27 March 2024
19:30 (N)
Scorecard

(H) Sunrisers Hyderabad; 277/3 (20 overs)	v	Mumbai Indians; 246/5 (20 overs)
Heinrich Klassen 80* (34); Piyush Chawla 1/34 (2 overs)		Tilak Varma 64 (34); Pat Cummins 2/35 (4 overs)

Sunrisers Hyderabad won by 31 runs
Rajiv Gandhi International Cricket Stadium, Hyderabad
Umpires: K. N. Ananthapadmanabhan (Ind) and Ulhas Gandhe (Ind)
Player of the match: Abhishek Sharma (Sunrisers Hyderabad)

- Mumbai Indians won the toss and elected to field.
- Sunrisers Hyderabad broke Royal Challengers Bengaluru's record (263) for the highest innings total in IPL (277).
- Mumbai Indians broke Rajasthan Royals' record (226) for the highest second innings total in IPL (246). This was also the highest total in a losing cause in an IPL match.
- The match broke the record for highest aggregate scored in an IPL match surpassing 469 runs between Chennai Super Kings and Rajasthan Royals in 2010 (523).

Match 14
1 April 2024
19:30 (N)
Scorecard

(H) Mumbai Indians; 125/9 (20 overs)	v	Rajasthan Royals; 127/4 (15.3 overs)
Hardik Pandya 34 (21); Yuzvendra Chahal 3/11 (4 overs)		Riyan Parag 54* (39); Akash Madhwal 3/20 (4 overs)

Rajasthan Royals won by 6 wickets
Wankhede Stadium, Mumbai
Umpires: Yeshwant Barde (Ind) and Saidharshan Kumar (Ind)
Player of the match: Trent Boult (Rajasthan Royals)

- Rajasthan Royals won the toss and elected to field.

Match 20
7 April 2024
15:30 (D/N)
Scorecard

(H) Mumbai Indians; 234/5 (20 overs)	v	Delhi Capitals; 205/8 (20 overs)
Rohit Sharma 49 (27); Axar Patel 2/35 (4 overs)		Tristan Stubbs 71* (25); Gerald Coetzee 4/34 (4 overs)

Mumbai Indians won by 29 runs
Wankhede Stadium, Mumbai
Umpires: Kumar Dharmasena (SL) and Ulhas Gandhe (Ind)
Player of the match: Romario Shepherd (Mumbai Indians)

- Delhi Capitals won the toss and elected to field.

Match 25
11 April 2024
19:30 (N)
Scorecard

Royal Challengers Bengaluru; 196/8 (20 overs)	v	Mumbai Indians (H); 199/3 (15.3 overs)
Faf du Plessis 61 (40); Jasprit Bumrah 5/21 (4 overs)		Ishan Kishan 69 (34); Will Jacks 1/24 (2 overs)

Mumbai Indians won by 7 wickets
Wankhede Stadium, Mumbai
Umpires: Nitin Menon (Ind) and Vineet Kulkarni (Ind)
Player of the match: Jasprit Bumrah (Mumbai Indians)

- Mumbai Indians won the toss and elected to field.

Match 29
14 April 2024
19:30 (N)
Scorecard

Chennai Super Kings; 206/4 (20 overs)	v	Mumbai Indians (H); 186/6 (20 overs)
Ruturaj Gaikwad 69 (40); Hardik Pandya 2/43 (3 overs)		Rohit Sharma 105* (63); Matheesha Pathirana 4/28 (4 overs)

Chennai Super Kings won by 20 runs
Wankhede Stadium, Mumbai
Umpires: Saiyed Khalid (Ind) and Nitin Menon (Ind)
Player of the match: Matheesha Pathirana (Chennai Super Kings)

- Mumbai Indians won the toss and elected to field.

Match 33
18 April 2024
19:30 (N)
Scorecard

Mumbai Indians; 192/7 (20 overs)	v	Punjab Kings (H); 183 (19.1 overs)
Suryakumar Yadav 78 (53); Harshal Patel 3/31 (4 overs)		Ashutosh Sharma 61 (28); Jasprit Bumrah 3/21 (4 overs)

Mumbai Indians won by 9 runs
Maharaja Yadavindra Singh International Cricket Stadium, Mullanpur
Umpires: Nand Kishore (Ind) and Vineet Kulkarni (Ind)
Player of the match: Jasprit Bumrah (Mumbai Indians)

- Punjab Kings won the toss and elected to field.

Match 38
22 April 2024
19:30 (N)
Scorecard

Mumbai Indians; 179/9 (20 overs)	v	Rajasthan Royals (H); 183/1 (18.4 overs)
Tilak Varma 65 (45); Sandeep Sharma 5/18 (4 overs)		Yashasvi Jaiswal 104* (60); Piyush Chawla 1/33 (4 overs)

Rajasthan Royals won by 9 wickets
Sawai Mansingh Stadium, Jaipur
Umpires: Anil Chaudhary (Ind) and Saidharshan Kumar (Ind)
Player of the match: Sandeep Sharma (Rajasthan Royals)

- Mumbai Indians won the toss and elected to bat.

Match 43
27 April 2024
15:30 (D/N)
Scorecard

(H) Delhi Capitals; 257/4 (20 overs)	v	Mumbai Indians; 247/9 (20 overs)
Jake Fraser-McGurk 84 (27); Mohammad Nabi 1/20 (2 overs)		Tilak Varma 63 (32); Rasikh Salam 3/34 (4 overs)

Delhi Capitals won by 10 runs
Arun Jaitley Stadium, Delhi
Umpires: Nikhil Patwardhan (Ind) and Navdeep Singh (Ind)
Player of the match: Jake Fraser-McGurk (Delhi Capitals)

- Mumbai Indians won the toss and elected to field.

Match 48
30 April 2024
19:30 (N)
Scorecard

Mumbai Indians; 144/7 (20 overs)	v	Lucknow Super Giants (H); 145/6 (19.2 overs)
Nehal Wadhera 46 (41); Mohsin Khan 2/36 (4 overs)		Marcus Stoinis 62 (45); Hardik Pandya 2/26 (4 overs)

Lucknow Super Giants won by 4 wickets
BRSABV Ekana Cricket Stadium, Lucknow
Umpires: Ulhas Gandhe (Ind) and Michael Gough (Eng)
Player of the match: Marcus Stoinis (Lucknow Super Giants)

- Lucknow Super Giants won the toss and elected to field.

Match 51
3 May 2024
19:30 (N)
Scorecard

Kolkata Knight Riders; 169 (19.5 overs)	v	Mumbai Indians (H); 145 (18.5 overs)
Venkatesh Iyer 70 (52); Jasprit Bumrah 3/18 (3.5 overs)		Suryakumar Yadav 56 (35); Mitchell Starc 4/33 (3.5 overs)

Kolkata Knight Riders won by 24 runs
Wankhede Stadium, Mumbai
Umpires: Jayaraman Madanagopal (Ind) and Tapan Sharma (Ind)
Player of the match: Venkatesh Iyer (Kolkata Knight Riders)

- Mumbai Indians won the toss and elected to field.

Match 55
6 May 2024
19:30 (N)
Scorecard

Sunrisers Hyderabad; 173/8 (20 overs)	v	Mumbai Indians (H); 174/3 (17.2 overs)
Travis Head 48 (30); Hardik Pandya 3/31 (4 overs)		Suryakumar Yadav 102* (51); Bhuvneshwar Kumar 1/22 (4 overs)

Mumbai Indians won by 7 wickets
Wankhede Stadium, Mumbai
Umpires: Tapan Sharma (Ind) and Navdeep Singh (Ind)
Player of the match: Suryakumar Yadav (Mumbai Indians)

- Mumbai Indians won the toss and elected to field.

Match 60
11 May 2024
19:30 (N)
Scorecard

(H) Kolkata Knight Riders; 157/7 (16 overs)	v	Mumbai Indians; 139/8 (16 overs)
Venkatesh Iyer 42 (21); Piyush Chawla 2/28 (3 overs)		Ishan Kishan 40 (22); Varun Chakravarthy 2/17 (4 overs)

Kolkata Knight Riders won by 18 runs
Eden Gardens, Kolkata
Umpires: Ulhas Gandhe (Ind) and Vinod Seshan (Ind)
Player of the match: Varun Chakravarthy (Kolkata Knight Riders)

- Mumbai Indians won the toss and elected to field.
- The match was reduced to 16 overs per side due to rain.
- Kolkata Knight Riders qualified for the playoffs as a result of this match.

Match 67
17 May 2024
19:30 (N)
Scorecard

Lucknow Super Giants; 214/6 (20 overs)	v	Mumbai Indians (H); 196/6 (20 overs)
Nicholas Pooran 75 (29); Nuwan Thushara 3/28 (4 overs)		Rohit Sharma 68 (38); Ravi Bishnoi 2/37 (4 overs)

Lucknow Super Giants won by 18 runs
Wankhede Stadium, Mumbai
Umpires: Rohan Pandit (Ind) and Navdeep Singh (Ind)
Player of the match: Nicholas Pooran (Lucknow Super Giants)

- Mumbai Indians won the toss and elected to field.

== Statistics ==
=== Most runs ===
Runs	Player	Innings	Highest score
417	Rohit Sharma	14	105 not out
416	Tilak Varma	13	65
345	Suryakumar Yadav	11	102 not out
320	Ishan Kishan	14	69
241	Tim David	11	45 not out

- Source: ESPNcricinfo

=== Most wickets ===
Wickets	Player	Matches	Best bowling
20	Jasprit Bumrah	13	5/21
13	Piyush Chawla	11	3/29
13	Gerald Coetzee	10	4/34
11	Hardik Pandya	12	3/31
8	Nuwan Thushara	7	3/28

- Source: ESPNcricinfo
