= 2022 Chennai Super Kings season =

Cricket Franchise

Chennai Super Kings
2022 season
- Coach: Stephen Fleming
- Captain: Ravindra Jadeja (8 matches); MS Dhoni (remaining matches)
- Ground(s): M. A. Chidambaram Stadium, Chennai
- Most runs: Ruturaj Gaikwad (368)
- Most wickets: Dwayne Bravo (16)
- Most catches: Ravindra Jadeja (7)
- Most wicket-keeping dismissals: MS Dhoni (9)

Chennai Super Kings (CSK) is a franchise cricket team based in Chennai, Tamil Nadu, India. They were one of ten teams to compete in the 2022 Indian Premier League. The Super Kings have previously lifted the IPL title four times (in 2010, 2011, 2018 and 2021) and were the defending champions in 2022.

The season was the first time since the inaugural season of the tournament that Suresh Raina was not a member of the team as he was not picked in the mega auction. Midway through the season Ravindra Jadeja resigned as the team's captain, with MS Dhoni, the team's long-term captain, taking over. The change in captaincy slightly improved their form from 2 wins in 8 to an additional 2 wins in 6, although it was a little too late, and turned out to be CSK's lowest league position until 2025.

== Background ==
The team retained four players ahead of the 2022 mega-auction.

Retained
MS Dhoni, Ravindra Jadeja, Moeen Ali, Ruturaj Gaikwad.
Released
Suresh Raina, Faf du Plessis, Mitchell Santner, Lungi Ngidi, Narayan Jagadeeshan, Shardul Thakur, Imran Tahir, Karn Sharma, Sam Curran, Josh Hazlewood, Ravisrinivasan Sai Kishore, Cheteshwar Pujara, Krishnappa Gowtham, Hari Nishanth, Bhagath Varma, Harishankar Reddy.
Acquired during the auction
Dwayne Bravo, Robin Uthappa, Deepak Chahar, KM Asif, Ambati Rayudu, Tushar Deshpande, Devon Conway, Subhranshu Senapati, Chezhian Harinishanth, Shivam Dube, Rajvardhan Hangargekar, Dwaine Pretorius, Mitchell Santner, Narayan Jagadeesan, Maheesh Theekshana, Prashant Solanki, Simarjeet Singh, Adam Milne, Mukesh Choudhary, Chris Jordan, Bhagath Varma.

== Squad ==
- Players with international caps are listed in **bold**.

No.	Name	Nationality	Birth date	Batting style	Bowling style	Year signed	Salary	Notes
Batsmen
9	**Ambati Rayudu**	India	23 September 1985 (aged 36)	Right-handed	Right-arm off break	2022	₹6.75 crore (US$700,000)	
16	Chezhian Harinishanth	India	16 August 1996 (aged 25)	Left-handed	Right-arm off break	2022	₹20 lakh (US$21,000)	
30	Subhranshu Senapati	India	30 December 1996 (aged 25)	Right-handed	Right-arm medium	2022	₹20 lakh (US$21,000)	
31	**Ruturaj Gaikwad**	India	31 January 1997 (aged 25)	Right-handed	Right-arm off break	2022	₹6 crore (US$620,000)	
88	**Devon Conway**	New Zealand	8 July 1991 (aged 30)	Left-handed	Right-arm medium	2022	₹1 crore (US$100,000)	Overseas
All-rounders
8	**Ravindra Jadeja**	India	6 December 1988 (aged 33)	Left-handed	Left-arm slow orthodox	2022	₹16 crore (US$1.7 million)	~~Captain~~ (Note: Ravindra Jadeja resigned as captain mid-season which led to the reappointment of MS Dhoni.)
10	**Moeen Ali**	England	18 June 1987 (aged 34)	Left-handed	Right-arm off break	2022	₹8 crore (US$830,000)	Overseas
25	**Shivam Dube**	India	26 June 1993 (aged 28)	Left-handed	Right-arm medium fast	2022	₹4 crore (US$420,000)	
29	**Dwaine Pretorius**	South Africa	29 March 1989 (aged 32)	Right-handed	Right-arm medium-fast	2022	₹50 lakh (US$52,000)	Overseas
47	**Dwayne Bravo**	Trinidad and Tobago	7 October 1983 (aged 38)	Right-handed	Right-arm medium-fast	2022	₹4.4 crore (US$460,000)	Overseas
74	**Mitchell Santner**	New Zealand	5 February 1992 (aged 30)	Left-handed	Slow left-arm orthodox	2022	₹1.9 crore (US$200,000)	Overseas
	Rajvardhan Hangargekar	India	10 November 2002 (aged 19)	Right-handed	Right-arm fast-medium	2022	₹1.5 crore (US$160,000)	
Wicket-keepers
6	Narayan Jagadeesan	India	24 December 1995 (aged 26)	Right-handed		2022	₹20 lakh (US$21,000)	
7	**MS Dhoni**	India	7 July 1981 (aged 40)	Right-handed	Right-arm medium	2022	₹12 crore (US$1.2 million)	Captain
77	**Robin Uthappa**	India	11 November 1985 (aged 36)	Right-handed	Right-arm off break	2022	₹2 crore (US$210,000)	
Spin bowlers
27	Bhagath Varma	India	21 September 1998 (aged 23)	Right-handed	Right-arm Off-break	2022	₹20 lakh (US$21,000)	
46	Prashant Solanki	India	22 February 2000 (aged 22)	Right-handed	Right-arm leg break	2022	₹1.2 crore (US$120,000)	
61	**Maheesh Theekshana**	Sri Lanka	1 August 2000 (aged 21)	Right-handed	Right-arm off break	2022	₹70 lakh (US$73,000)	Overseas
Pace bowlers
20	**Adam Milne**	New Zealand	13 April 1992 (aged 29)	Right-handed	Right-arm fast	2022	₹1.9 crore (equivalent to ₹2.0 crore or US$210,000 in 2023)	Overseas
24	KM Asif	India	24 July 1993 (aged 28)	Right-handed	Right-arm fast-medium	2022	₹20 lakh (US$21,000)	
33	Mukesh Choudhary	India	6 July 1996 (aged 25)	Left-handed	Left-arm medium	2022	₹20 lakh (US$21,000)	
34	**Chris Jordan**	England	4 October 1988 (aged 33)	Right-handed	Right-arm fast	2022	₹3.6 crore (equivalent to ₹3.8 crore or US$400,000 in 2023)	Overseas
42	Tushar Deshpande	India	15 May 1995 (aged 26)	Right-handed	Right-arm fast-medium	2022	₹20 lakh (US$21,000)	
90	**Deepak Chahar**	India	7 August 1992 (aged 29)	Right-handed	Right-arm fast-medium	2022	₹14 crore (US$1.5 million)	
98	Simarjeet Singh	India	17 January 1998 (aged 24)	Right-handed	Right-arm medium-fast	2022	₹20 lakh (US$21,000)	
99	Matheesha Pathirana	Sri Lanka	18 December 2002 (aged 19)	Right-handed	Right-arm fast	2022	₹20 lakh (equivalent to ₹21 lakh or US$22,000 in 2023)	Overseas; Replacement for Adam Milne
Source: CSK Players

== Administration and support staff ==
Position	Name
CEO	Kasinath Viswanathan
Team manager	Russell Radhakrishnan
Head coach	Stephen Fleming
Batting coach	Michael Hussey
Bowling coach	DJ Bravo
Fielding coach	Rajiv Kumar
	Source:CSK Staff

== Kit manufacturers and sponsors ==
Kit manufacturer	Shirt sponsor (chest)	Shirt sponsor (back)	Chest Branding
Seven	TVS Eurogrip	India Cements	Gulf Oil
Source :

T20 uniform

== Season standings ==
=== Points table ===
Pos	Grp	Team	Pld	W	L	NR	Pts	NRR	Qualification
1	B	Gujarat Titans (C)	14	10	4	0	20	0.316	Advanced to Qualifier 1
2	A	Rajasthan Royals (R)	14	9	5	0	18	0.298	Advanced to Qualifier 1
3	A	Lucknow Super Giants (4th)	14	9	5	0	18	0.251	Advanced to Eliminator
4	B	Royal Challengers Bangalore (3rd)	14	8	6	0	16	−0.253	Advanced to Eliminator
5	A	Delhi Capitals	14	7	7	0	14	0.204	
6	B	Punjab Kings	14	7	7	0	14	0.126	
7	A	Kolkata Knight Riders	14	6	8	0	12	0.146	
8	B	Sunrisers Hyderabad	14	6	8	0	12	−0.379	
9	B	Chennai Super Kings	14	4	10	0	8	−0.203	
10	A	Mumbai Indians	14	4	10	0	8	−0.506	

Source: IPLT20.com
(C) Champions; (R) Runners-up
The four top-ranked teams qualified for the playoffs.

== Group stage ==
The schedule for the group stages of IPL 2022 was published 7 March 2022.

=== Matches ===
Match 1
26 March 2022
19:30 (N)
Scorecard

Chennai Super Kings; 131/5 (20 overs)	v	Kolkata Knight Riders; 133/4 (18.3 overs)
MS Dhoni 50* (38); Umesh Yadav 2/20 (4 overs)		Ajinkya Rahane 44 (34); Dwayne Bravo 3/20 (4 overs)

Kolkata Knight Riders won by 6 wickets
Wankhede Stadium, Mumbai
Umpires: Anil Chaudhary (Ind) and Nitin Menon (Ind)
Player of the match: Umesh Yadav (Kolkata Knight Riders)

- Kolkata Knight Riders won the toss and elected to field.

Match 7
31 March 2022
19:30 (N)
Scorecard

Chennai Super Kings; 210/7 (20 overs)	v	Lucknow Super Giants; 211/4 (19.3 overs)
Robin Uthappa 50 (27); Ravi Bishnoi 2/24 (4 overs)		Quinton de Kock 65 (45); Dwaine Pretorius 2/31 (4 overs)

Lucknow Super Giants won by 6 wickets
Brabourne Stadium, Mumbai
Umpires: Virender Sharma (Ind) and Rod Tucker (Aus)
Player of the match: Evin Lewis (Lucknow Super Giants)

- Lucknow Super Giants won the toss and elected to field.

Match 11
3 April 2022
19:30 (N)
Scorecard

Punjab Kings; 180/8 (20 overs)	v	Chennai Super Kings; 126 (18 overs)
Liam Livingstone 60 (32); Chris Jordan 2/23 (4 overs)		Shivam Dube 57 (30); Rahul Chahar 3/25 (4 overs)

Punjab Kings won by 54 runs
Brabourne Stadium, Mumbai
Umpires: Yeshwant Barde (Ind) and Rod Tucker (Aus)
Player of the match: Liam Livingstone (Punjab Kings)

- Chennai Super Kings won the toss and elected to field.

Match 17
9 April 2022
15:30 (D/N)
Scorecard

Chennai Super Kings; 154/7 (20 overs)	v	Sunrisers Hyderabad; 155/2 (17.4 overs)
Moeen Ali 48 (35); Washington Sundar 2/21 (4 overs)		Abhishek Sharma 75 (50); Dwayne Bravo 1/29 (2.4 overs)

Sunrisers Hyderabad won by 8 wickets
DY Patil Stadium, Navi Mumbai
Umpires: Nitin Menon (Ind) and Navdeep Singh (Ind)
Player of the match: Abhishek Sharma (Sunrisers Hyderabad)

- Sunrisers Hyderabad won the toss and elected to field.

Match 22
12 April 2022
19:30 (N)
Scorecard

Chennai Super Kings; 216/4 (20 overs)	v	Royal Challengers Bangalore; 193/9 (20 overs)
Shivam Dube 95* (46); Wanindu Hasaranga 2/35 (3 overs)		Shahbaz Ahmed 41 (27); Maheesh Theekshana 4/33 (4 overs)

Chennai Super Kings won by 23 runs
DY Patil Stadium, Navi Mumbai
Umpires: Nitin Menon (Ind) and Nitin Pandit (Ind)
Player of the match: Shivam Dube (Chennai Super Kings)

- Royal Challengers Bangalore won the toss and elected to field.

Match 29
17 April 2022
19:30 (N)
Scorecard

Chennai Super Kings; 169/5 (20 overs)	v	Gujarat Titans; 170/7 (19.5 overs)
Ruturaj Gaikwad 73 (48); Alzarri Joseph 2/34 (4 overs)		David Miller 94* (51); Dwayne Bravo 3/23 (4 overs)

Gujarat Titans won by 3 wickets
MCA International Stadium, Pune
Umpires: K. N. Ananthapadmanabhan (Ind) and Ulhas Gandhe (Ind)
Player of the match: David Miller (Gujarat Titans)

- Gujarat Titans won the toss and elected to field

Match 33
21 April 2022
19:30 (N)
Scorecard

Mumbai Indians; 155/7 (20 overs)	v	Chennai Super Kings; 156/7 (20 overs)
Tilak Varma 51* (43); Mukesh Choudhary 3/19 (3 overs)		Ambati Rayudu 40 (35); Daniel Sams 4/30 (4 overs)

Chennai Super Kings won by 3 wickets
DY Patil Stadium, Navi Mumbai
Umpires: Ulhas Gandhe (Ind) and Bruce Oxenford (Aus)
Player of the match: Mukesh Choudhary (Chennai Super Kings)

- Chennai Super Kings won the toss and elected to field.
- Hrithik Shokeen (Mumbai Indians) made his T20 debut.

Match 38
25 April 2022
19:30 (N)
Scorecard

Punjab Kings; 187/4 (20 overs)	v	Chennai Super Kings; 176/6 (20 overs)
Shikhar Dhawan 88* (59); Dwayne Bravo 2/42 (4 overs)		Ambati Rayudu 78 (39); Kagiso Rabada 2/23 (4 overs)

Punjab Kings won by 11 runs
Wankhede Stadium, Mumbai
Umpires: Marais Erasmus (SA) and Tapan Sharma (Ind)
Player of the match: Shikhar Dhawan (Punjab Kings)

- Chennai Super Kings won the toss and elected to field.

Match 46
1 May 2022
19:30 (N)
Scorecard

Chennai Super Kings; 202/2 (20 overs)	v	Sunrisers Hyderabad; 189/6 (20 overs)
Ruturaj Gaikwad 99 (57); T. Natarajan 2/42 (4 overs)		Nicholas Pooran 64* (33); Mukesh Choudhary 4/46 (4 overs)

Chennai Super Kings won by 13 runs
MCA International Stadium, Pune
Umpires: K. N. Ananthapadmanabhan (Ind) and Anil Chaudhary (Ind)
Player of the match: Ruturaj Gaikwad (Chennai Super Kings)

- Sunrisers Hyderabad won the toss and elected to field.

Match 49
4 May 2022
19:30 (N)
Scorecard

Royal Challengers Bangalore; 173/8 (20 overs)	v	Chennai Super Kings; 160/8 (20 overs)
Mahipal Lomror 42 (27); Maheesh Theekshana 3/27 (4 overs)		Devon Conway 56 (37); Harshal Patel 3/35 (4 overs)

Royal Challengers Bangalore won by 13 runs
MCA International Stadium, Pune
Umpires: K. N. Ananthapadmanabhan (Ind) and Michael Gough (Eng)
Player of the match: Harshal Patel (Royal Challengers Bangalore)

- Chennai Super Kings won the toss and elected to field.

Match 55
8 May 2022
19:30 (N)
Scorecard

Chennai Super Kings; 208/6 (20 overs)	v	Delhi Capitals; 117 (17.4 overs)
Devon Conway 87 (49); Anrich Nortje 3/42 (4 overs)		Mitchell Marsh 25 (20); Moeen Ali 3/13 (4 overs)

Chennai Super Kings won by 91 runs
DY Patil Stadium, Navi Mumbai
Umpires: Nitin Menon (Ind) and Rohan Pandit (Ind)
Player of the match: Devon Conway (Chennai Super Kings)

- Delhi Capitals won the toss and elected to field.

Match 59
12 May 2022
19:30 (N)
Scorecard

Chennai Super Kings; 97 (16 overs)	v	Mumbai Indians; 103/5 (14.5 overs)
MS Dhoni 36* (33); Daniel Sams 3/16 (4 overs)		Tilak Varma 34* (32); Mukesh Choudhary 3/23 (4 overs)

Mumbai Indians won by 5 wickets
Wankhede Stadium, Mumbai
Umpires: Chris Gaffaney (NZ) and Chirra Ravikanthreddy (Ind)
Player of the match: Daniel Sams (Mumbai Indians)

- Mumbai Indians won the toss and elected to field.
- Chennai Super Kings were eliminated as a result of this match.

Match 62
15 May 2022
15:30 (D/N)
Scorecard

Chennai Super Kings; 133/5 (20 overs)	v	Gujarat Titans; 137/3 (19.1 overs)
Ruturaj Gaikwad 53 (49); Mohammed Shami 2/19 (4 overs)		Wriddhiman Saha 67* (57); Matheesha Pathirana 2/24 (3.1 overs)

Gujarat Titans won by 7 wickets
Wankhede Stadium, Mumbai
Umpires: Rohan Pandit (Ind) and Virender Sharma (Ind)
Player of the match: Wriddhiman Saha (Gujarat Titans)

- Chennai Super Kings won the toss and elected to bat.

Match 68
20 May 2022
19:30 (N)
Scorecard

Chennai Super Kings; 150/6 (20 overs)	v	Rajasthan Royals; 151/5 (19.4 overs)
Moeen Ali 93 (57); Obed McCoy 2/20 (4 overs)		Yashasvi Jaiswal 59 (44); Prashant Solanki 2/20 (2 overs)

Rajasthan Royals won by 5 wickets
Brabourne Stadium, Mumbai
Umpires: Chris Gaffaney (NZ) and Nikhil Patwardhan (Ind)
Player of the match: Ravichandran Ashwin (Rajasthan Royals)

- Chennai Super Kings won the toss and elected to bat.
- Rajasthan Royals qualified for the playoffs as a result of this match.

== Statistics ==
=== Most runs ===
No.	Name	Match	Inns	NO	Runs	HS	Ave.	BF	SR	100s	50s	0	4s	6s
1	Ruturaj Gaikwad	14	14	0	368	99	26.28	291	126.46	0	3	2	33	14
2	Shivam Dube	11	11	1	289	95*	28.90	185	152.97	0	2	1	22	16
3	Ambati Rayudu	13	11	0	274	78	24.90	224	122.32	0	1	0	25	15
4	Devon Conway	7	7	1	252	87	42.00	173	145.66	0	3	1	22	12
