= 2022 Delhi Capitals season =

Indian Premier League cricket team season

Delhi Capitals
2022 season
- Coach: Ricky Ponting
- Captain: Rishabh Pant
- Ground(s): Arun Jaitley Stadium, Delhi
- Most runs: David Warner (432)
- Most wickets: Kuldeep Yadav (21)

Delhi Capitals are a Twenty20 franchise cricket team based in Delhi, India. The team competed in the 2022 edition of the Indian Premier League. Founded in 2008 as the Delhi Daredevils, the franchise is owned by the GMR Group and the JSW Group. The team's home ground is Arun Jaitley Stadium, located in New Delhi. They were one of the ten teams to compete in the 2022 Indian Premier League.

== Background ==
Delhi Capitals retained four players ahead of the 2022 mega-auction.

Retained Players
Rishabh Pant, Axar Patel, Prithvi Shaw, Anrich Nortje
Released
Shreyas Iyer, Ajinkya Rahane, Amit Mishra, Avesh Khan, Ishant Sharma, Kagiso Rabada, Ravichandran Ashwin, Shikhar Dhawan, Shimron Hetmyer, Marcus Stoinis, Lalit Yadav, Pravin Dubey, Chris Woakes, Steve Smith, Manimaran Siddharth, Tom Curran, Umesh Yadav, Lukman Meriwala, Vishnu Vinod, Ripal Patel, Sam Billings
Acquired at the auction
David Warner, Mitchell Marsh, Shardul Thakur, Mustafizur Rahman, Kuldeep Yadav, Ashwin Hebbar, Sarfaraz Khan, Kamlesh Nagarkoti, KS Bharat, Mandeep Singh, Khaleel Ahmed, Chetan Sakariya, Lalit Yadav, Ripal Patel, Yash Dhull, Rovman Powell, Pravin Dubey, Lungi Ngidi, Tim Seifert, Vicky Ostwal.

== Squad ==
- Players with international caps are listed in **bold**.
- Squad strength: 24 (17 - Indian, 7 - overseas)
- Ages correct as of 27 March 2022.

| No. | Name | Nationality | Birth date | Batting style | Bowling style | Year signed | Salary | Notes |
Captain
| 17 | **Rishabh Pant** | India | 4 October 1997 (aged 24) | Left-handed | | 2016 | ₹16 crore (US$1.7 million) | |
Batters
| 18 | **Mandeep Singh** | India | 18 December 1991 (aged 30) | Right-handed | Right-arm medium | 2022 | ₹1.1 crore (US$110,000) | |
| 28 | Ripal Patel | India | 28 September 1995 (aged 26) | Right-handed | Right-arm Medium | 2021 | ₹20 lakh (US$21,000) | |
| 31 | **David Warner** | Australia | 27 October 1986 (aged 35) | Left-handed | Right-arm leg break | 2022 | ₹6.25 crore (US$650,000) | Overseas |
| 52 | **Rovman Powell** | West Indies | 23 July 1993 (aged 28) | Right-handed | Right-arm fast medium | 2022 | ₹2.8 crore (US$290,000) | Overseas |
| 97 | Sarfaraz Khan | India | 22 October 1997 (aged 24) | Right-handed | leg break | 2022 | ₹20 lakh (US$21,000) | |
| 100 | **Prithvi Shaw** | India | 9 November 1999 (aged 22) | Right-handed | Right-arm off break | 2018 | ₹7.5 crore (US$780,000) | |
| | Yash Dhull | India | 11 November 2002 (aged 19) | Right-handed | Right-arm off break | 2022 | ₹50 lakh (US$52,000) | |
All-Rounders
| 8 | **Mitchell Marsh** | Australia | 20 October 1991 (aged 30) | Right-handed | Right-arm medium | 2022 | ₹6 crore (US$630,000) | Overseas |
| 16 | Lalit Yadav | India | 3 January 1997 (aged 25) | Right-handed | Right-arm off break | 2021 | ₹65 lakh (US$68,000) | |
| 20 | **Axar Patel** | India | 20 January 1994 (aged 28) | Left-handed | Left-arm orthodox | 2019 | ₹9 crore (US$940,000) | |
| | Ashwin Hebbar | India | 15 November 1995 (aged 26) | Right-handed | Right-arm medium | 2022 | ₹20 lakh (US$21,000) | |
Wicket-Keepers
| 15 | K. S. Bharat | India | 3 October 1993 (aged 28) | Right-handed | – | 2022 | | |
| 43 | **Tim Seifert** | New Zealand | 14 December 1994 (aged 27) | Right-handed | | 2022 | ₹50 lakh (US$52,000) | Overseas |
Pace Bowlers
| 2 | **Anrich Nortje** | South Africa | 16 November 1993 (aged 28) | Right-handed | Right-arm fast | 2020 | ₹6.5 crore (US$680,000) | Overseas |
| 5 | Kamlesh Nagarkoti | India | 4 May 1998 (aged 23) | Right-handed | Right-arm fast | 2022 | ₹1 crore (US$100,000) | |
| 54 | **Shardul Thakur** | India | 16 October 1991 (aged 30) | Right-handed | Right-arm medium-pace | 2022 | ₹10.75 crore (US$1.1 million) | |
| 55 | **Chetan Sakariya** | India | 28 February 1998 (aged 24) | Left-handed | Left arm Medium-fast | 2022 | ₹1.2 crore (US$130,000) | |
| 71 | **Khaleel Ahmed** | India | 5 December 1997 (aged 24) | Right-handed | Left-arm Fast-Medium | 2022 | ₹5.25 crore (US$550,000) | |
| 90 | **Mustafizur Rahman** | Bangladesh | 6 September 1995 (aged 26) | Left-handed | Left-arm fast-medium | 2022 | ₹2 crore (US$210,000) | Overseas |
| | **Lungi Ngidi** | South Africa | 29 March 1996 (aged 25) | Right-handed | Right arm Fast-medium | 2022 | ₹50 lakh (US$52,000) | Overseas |
Spin Bowlers
| 23 | **Kuldeep Yadav** | India | 14 December 1994 (aged 27) | Left-handed | Slow left-arm wrist spin | 2022 | ₹2 crore (US$210,000) | |
| 46 | Praveen Dubey | India | 1 July 1993 (aged 28) | Right-handed | leg break googly | 2020 | ₹50 lakh (US$52,000) | |
| | Vicky Ostwal | India | 1 September 2002 (aged 19) | Right-Handed | Left-arm orthodox | 2022 | ₹20 lakh (US$21,000) | |
Source:DC squad

== Administration and support staff ==
| Position | Name |
|---|---|
| Team manager | Siddharth Bhasin |
| Head coach | Ricky Ponting |
| Assistant coach | Ajit Agarkar, Shane Watson |
| Batting coach | Pravin Amre |
| Bowling coach | James Hopes |
| Fielding coach | Biju George |
Source:DC Staff

== Kit manufacturers and sponsors ==
| Kit manufacturer | Shirt sponsor (chest) | Shirt sponsor (back) | Chest branding |
|---|---|---|---|
| Wrogn | JSW | Octa | APL Apollo |
Source :

T20 uniform

== Teams and standings ==
=== Points table ===
| Pos | Grp | Team | Pld | W | L | NR | Pts | NRR | Qualification |
|---|---|---|---|---|---|---|---|---|---|
| 1 | B | Gujarat Titans (C) | 14 | 10 | 4 | 0 | 20 | 0.316 | Advanced to Qualifier 1 |
| 2 | A | Rajasthan Royals (R) | 14 | 9 | 5 | 0 | 18 | 0.298 | Advanced to Qualifier 1 |
| 3 | A | Lucknow Super Giants (4th) | 14 | 9 | 5 | 0 | 18 | 0.251 | Advanced to Eliminator |
| 4 | B | Royal Challengers Bangalore (3rd) | 14 | 8 | 6 | 0 | 16 | −0.253 | Advanced to Eliminator |
| 5 | A | Delhi Capitals | 14 | 7 | 7 | 0 | 14 | 0.204 | |
| 6 | B | Punjab Kings | 14 | 7 | 7 | 0 | 14 | 0.126 | |
| 7 | A | Kolkata Knight Riders | 14 | 6 | 8 | 0 | 12 | 0.146 | |
| 8 | B | Sunrisers Hyderabad | 14 | 6 | 8 | 0 | 12 | −0.379 | |
| 9 | B | Chennai Super Kings | 14 | 4 | 10 | 0 | 8 | −0.203 | |
| 10 | A | Mumbai Indians | 14 | 4 | 10 | 0 | 8 | −0.506 | |

Source: IPLT20.com
(C) Champions; (R) Runners-up
The four top-ranked teams qualified for the playoffs.

== Group fixtures ==
Match 2
27 March 2022
15:30 (D/N)
Scorecard

| Mumbai Indians; 177/5 (20 overs) | v | Delhi Capitals; 179/6 (18.2 overs) |
| Ishan Kishan 81* (48); Kuldeep Yadav 3/18 (4 overs) | | Lalit Yadav 48* (38); Basil Thampi 3/35 (4 overs) |

Delhi Capitals won by 4 wickets
Brabourne Stadium, Mumbai
Umpires: Saiyed Khalid (Ind) and Rod Tucker (Aus)
Player of the match: Kuldeep Yadav (Delhi Capitals)

- Delhi Capitals won the toss and elected to field.

Match 10
2 April 2022
19:30 (N)
Scorecard

| Gujarat Titans; 171/6 (20 overs) | v | Delhi Capitals; 157/9 (20 overs) |
| Shubman Gill 84 (46); Mustafizur Rahman 3/23 (4 overs) | | Rishabh Pant 43 (29); Lockie Ferguson 4/28 (4 overs) |

Gujarat Titans won by 14 runs
MCA International Stadium, Pune
Umpires: K. N. Ananthapadmanabhan (Ind) and Ulhas Gandhe (Ind)
Player of the match: Lockie Ferguson (Gujarat Titans)

- Delhi Capitals won the toss and elected to field.

Match 15
7 April 2022
19:30 (N)
Scorecard

| Delhi Capitals; 149/3 (20 overs) | v | Lucknow Super Giants; 155/4 (19.4 overs) |
| Prithvi Shaw 61 (34); Ravi Bishnoi 2/22 (4 overs) | | Quinton de Kock 80 (52); Kuldeep Yadav 2/31 (3.4 overs) |

Lucknow Super Giants won by 6 wickets
DY Patil Stadium, Navi Mumbai
Umpires: Tapan Sharma (Ind) and Rod Tucker (Aus)
Player of the match: Quinton de Kock (Lukhnow Super Giants)

- Lucknow Super Giants won the toss and elected to field.

Match 19
10 April 2022
15:30 (D/N)
Scorecard

| Delhi Capitals; 215/5 (20 overs) | v | Kolkata Knight Riders; 171 (19.4 overs) |
| David Warner 61 (45); Sunil Narine 2/21 (4 overs) | | Shreyas Iyer 54 (33); Kuldeep Yadav 4/35 (4 overs) |

Delhi Capitals won by 44 runs
Brabourne Stadium, Mumbai
Umpires: Chris Gaffaney (NZ) and Jayaraman Madanagopal (Ind)
Player of the match: Kuldeep Yadav (Delhi Capitals)

- Kolkata Knight Riders won the toss and elected to field.

Match 27
16 April 2022
19:30 (N)
Scorecard

| Royal Challengers Bangalore; 189/5 (20 overs) | v | Delhi Capitals; 173/7 (20 overs) |
| Dinesh Karthik 66* (34); Shardul Thakur 1/27 (4 overs) | | David Warner 66 (38); Josh Hazlewood 3/28 (4 overs) |

Royal Challengers Bangalore won by 16 runs
Wankhede Stadium, Mumbai
Umpires: Jayaraman Madanagopal (Ind) and Chirra Ravikanthreddy (Ind)
Player of the match: Dinesh Karthik (Royal Challengers Bangalore)

- Delhi Capitals won the toss and elected to field.

Match 32
20 April 2022
19:30 (N)
Scorecard

| Punjab Kings; 115 (20 overs) | v | Delhi Capitals; 119/1 (10.3 overs) |
| Jitesh Sharma 32 (23); Axar Patel 2/10 (4 overs) | | David Warner 60* (30); Rahul Chahar 1/21 (2.3 overs) |

Delhi Capitals won by 9 wickets
Brabourne Stadium, Mumbai
Umpires: Tapan Sharma (Ind) and Rod Tucker (Aus)
Player of the match: Kuldeep Yadav (Delhi Capitals)

- Delhi Capitals won the toss and elected to field.
- The match was originally scheduled to take place at the MCA International Stadium in Pune, but it was relocated to the Brabourne Stadium after a number of COVID-19 cases in the Delhi camp.

Match 34
22 April 2022
19:30 (N)
Scorecard

| Rajasthan Royals; 222/2 (20 overs) | v | Delhi Capitals; 207/8 (20 overs) |
| Jos Buttler 116 (65); Mustafizur Rahman 1/43 (4 overs) | | Rishabh Pant 44 (24); Prasidh Krishna 3/22 (4 overs) |

Rajasthan Royals won by 15 runs
Wankhede Stadium, Mumbai
Umpires: Nitin Menon (Ind) and Nikhil Patwardhan (Ind)
Player of the match: Jos Buttler (Rajasthan Royals)

- Delhi Capitals won the toss and elected to field.
- The match was originally scheduled to take place at the MCA International Stadium in Pune, but it was relocated to the Wankhede Stadium after a number of COVID-19 cases in the Delhi camp.
- Jos Buttler (Rajasthan Royals) became the second player to score consecutive hundreds in the IPL, after Shikhar Dhawan. Buttler also became the second player after Virat Kohli to score three or more centuries in a single IPL season.

Match 41
28 April 2022
19:30 (N)
Scorecard

| Kolkata Knight Riders; 146/9 (20 overs) | v | Delhi Capitals; 150/6 (19 overs) |
| Nitish Rana 57 (34); Kuldeep Yadav 4/14 (3 overs) | | David Warner 42 (26); Umesh Yadav 3/24 (4 overs) |

Delhi Capitals won by 4 wickets
Wankhede Stadium, Mumbai
Umpires: Anil Chaudhary (Ind) and Pashchim Pathak (Ind)
Player of the match: Kuldeep Yadav (Delhi Capitals)

- Delhi Capitals won the toss and elected to field.
- Harshit Rana (Kolkata Knight Riders) made his T20 debut.

Match 45
1 May 2022
15:30 (D/N)
Scorecard

| Lucknow Super Giants; 195/3 (20 overs) | v | Delhi Capitals; 189/7 (20 overs) |
| KL Rahul 77 (51); Shardul Thakur 3/40 (4 overs) | | Rishabh Pant 44 (30); Mohsin Khan 4/16 (4 overs) |

Lucknow Super Giants won by 6 runs
Wankhede Stadium, Mumbai
Umpires: Chris Gaffaney (NZ) and Chirra Ravikanthreddy (Ind)
Player of the match: Mohsin Khan (Lucknow Super Giants)

- Lucknow Super Giants won the toss and elected to bat.

Match 50
5 May 2022
19:30 (N)
Scorecard

| Delhi Capitals; 207/3 (20 overs) | v | Sunrisers Hyderabad; 186/8 (20 overs) |
| David Warner 92* (58); Bhuvneshwar Kumar 1/25 (4 overs) | | Nicholas Pooran 62 (34); Khaleel Ahmed 3/30 (4 overs) |

Delhi Capitals won by 21 runs
Brabourne Stadium, Mumbai
Umpires: Nikhil Patwardhan (Ind) and Navdeep Singh (Ind)
Player of the match: David Warner (Delhi Capitals)

- Sunrisers Hyderabad won the toss and elected to field.

Match 55
8 May 2022
19:30 (N)
Scorecard

| Chennai Super Kings; 208/6 (20 overs) | v | Delhi Capitals; 117 (17.4 overs) |
| Devon Conway 87 (49); Anrich Nortje 3/42 (4 overs) | | Mitchell Marsh 25 (20); Moeen Ali 3/13 (4 overs) |

Chennai Super Kings won by 91 runs
DY Patil Stadium, Navi Mumbai
Umpires: Nitin Menon (Ind) and Rohan Pandit (Ind)
Player of the match: Devon Conway (Chennai Super Kings)

- Delhi Capitals won the toss and elected to field.

Match 58
11 May 2022
19:30 (N)
Scorecard

| Rajasthan Royals; 160/6 (20 overs) | v | Delhi Capitals; 161/2 (18.1 overs) |
| Ravichandran Ashwin 50 (38); Chetan Sakariya 2/23 (4 overs) | | Mitchell Marsh 89 (62); Trent Boult 1/32 (4 overs) |

Delhi Capitals won by 8 wickets
DY Patil Stadium, Navi Mumbai
Umpires: Nitin Menon (Ind) and Nikhil Patwardhan (Ind)
Player of the match: Mitchell Marsh (Delhi Capitals)

- Delhi Capitals won the toss and elected to field.

Match 64
16 May 2022
19:30 (N)
Scorecard

| Delhi Capitals; 159/7 (20 overs) | v | Punjab Kings; 142/9 (20 overs) |
| Mitchell Marsh 63 (48); Liam Livingstone 3/27 (4 overs) | | Jitesh Sharma 44 (34); Shardul Thakur 4/36 (4 overs) |

Delhi Capitals won by 17 runs
DY Patil Stadium, Navi Mumbai
Umpires: Sadashiv Iyer (Ind) and Nitin Menon (Ind)
Player of the match: Shardul Thakur (Delhi Capitals)

- Punjab Kings won the toss and elected to field.

Match 69
21 May 2022
19:30 (N)
Scorecard

| Delhi Capitals; 159/7 (20 overs) | v | Mumbai Indians; 160/5 (19.1 overs) |
| Rovman Powell 43 (34); Jasprit Bumrah 3/25 (4 overs) | | Ishan Kishan 48 (35); Shardul Thakur 2/32 (3 overs) |

Mumbai Indians won by 5 wickets
Wankhede Stadium, Mumbai
Umpires: Nitin Menon (Ind) and Tapan Sharma (Ind)
Player of the match: Jasprit Bumrah (Mumbai Indians)

- Mumbai Indians won the toss and elected to field.
- Royal Challengers Bangalore qualified for the playoffs and Delhi Capitals were eliminated as a result of this match.
