= Indian Premier League =

Professional Twenty20 cricket league in India

- Tournament logo
- Countries: India
- Administrator: Board of Control for Cricket in India
- Headquarters: Mumbai, India
- Format: Twenty20
- First edition: 2008
- Latest edition: 2026
- Next edition: 2027
- Tournament format: Double round-robin format followed by playoffs
- Current champion: Royal Challengers Bengaluru (2nd title)
- Most successful: Chennai Super Kings; Mumbai Indians (5 titles each)
- Most runs: (India) Virat Kohli (9,336)
- Most wickets: (India) Yuzvendra Chahal (233)
- TV: List of broadcasters
- Website: iplt20.com
- 2026 Indian Premier League

The Indian Premier League (IPL) is a professional Twenty20 (T20) cricket league in India, organised by the Board of Control for Cricket in India (BCCI). Founded in 2007, it features ten city-based franchise teams. The IPL is widely regarded as the world's most commercially successful cricket league. It is the 11th richest sporting league in the world by revenue, and the third-richest sporting league in the world by revenue per-match. It is held annually between March and May. It has an exclusive window in the Future Tours Programme of the International Cricket Council, resulting in fewer international tours occurring during the seasons. It is also the most viewed Indian sports event, as per the Broadcast Audience Research Council.

In 2010, the IPL became the first sporting event to broadcast live on YouTube. In 2014, it ranked sixth in attendance among all sports leagues. Inspired by the success of the IPL, other Indian sports leagues have been established. (Note: Indian cricket leagues established using similar formats to the IPL include the Women's Premier League and various domestic state-level leagues. Leagues established in other sports include the association football Indian Super League, the Pro Kabaddi League and Pro Volleyball League Other international leagues have also adopted elements of the IPL and been influenced by the business model used.) In 2023, the league sold its media rights for the next four seasons for US$6.4 billion to Viacom18 and Star Sports, which meant that each IPL match was valued at $13.4 million. As of 2026, there have been 19 seasons of the tournament. The current champions are the Royal Challengers Bengaluru, who won the 2026 season after defeating the Gujarat Titans in the final.

A women's edition of the Indian Premier League, known as the Women's Premier League, was established in 2022 and had its inaugural season in 2023.

== History ==
=== Background ===
In April 2007, Essel Group launched the Indian Cricket League (ICL) in partnership with IL&FS. The ICL was not recognized by the Board of Control for Cricket in India (BCCI) or the International Cricket Council (ICC). Moreover, the BCCI was unhappy about its committee members joining the ICL executive board. In response, the BCCI increased the prize money for its domestic tournaments and imposed lifetime bans on players who joined the ICL, which it considered a rebel league.

=== Foundation ===
On 13 September 2007, as the 2007 ICC World Twenty20 began, the BCCI launched the Indian Premier League, an annual franchise-based Twenty20 cricket competition. The inaugural season was scheduled to start in April 2008, commencing with a "high-profile ceremony" in New Delhi. BCCI vice-president Lalit Modi, who led the IPL initiative, provided details of the tournament, including its format, prize money, franchise revenue system, and squad composition rules. The league, to be managed by a seven-person governing council, would also serve as the qualifying mechanism for that year's Champions League Twenty20.

To determine team ownership, an auction for the franchises was held on 24 January 2008. The reserve prices for the eight franchises totalled $400 million, but the auction ultimately raised $723.59 million. The league officially commenced in April 2008, featuring Chennai Super Kings (CSK), Mumbai Indians (MI), Delhi Daredevils (DD), Kings XI Punjab (KXIP), Deccan Chargers (DC), Rajasthan Royals (RR), Kolkata Knight Riders (KKR), and Royal Challengers Bangalore (RCB).

In 2009, the BCCI and other national boards offered amnesty to rival ICL's players and officials, provided they terminated their contracts. The resulting player exodus and financial difficulties forced ICL to shut down later that year.

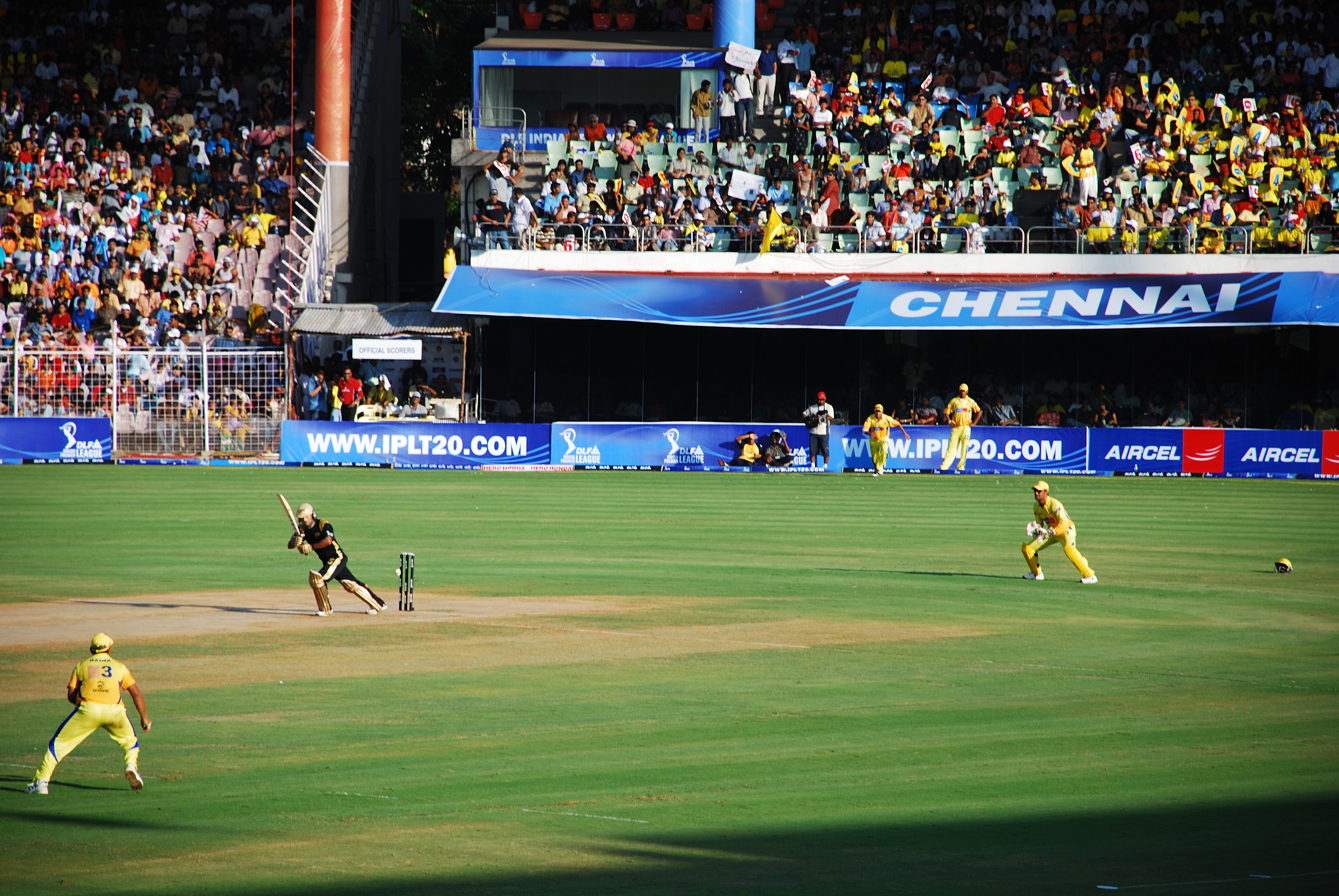
A match during the 2008 IPL inaugural season in Chennai

=== Expansions and terminations ===
New franchises, Pune Warriors India and Kochi Tuskers Kerala, joined the league before the fourth season in 2011. The Sahara Adventure Sports Group purchased the Pune franchise for $370 million, while Rendezvous Sports World bought the Kochi franchise for $333.3 million. The Kochi franchise was terminated after just one season due to their failure to pay the BCCI the 10% bank guarantee element of the franchise fee.

In September 2012, the Deccan Chargers franchise agreement was terminated after the BCCI failed to find new owners. In October, an auction was held for a replacement franchise; Sun TV Network won the bid for what became the Hyderabad franchise; the team was named Sunrisers Hyderabad.

Pune Warriors India withdrew from the IPL in May 2013 due to financial differences with the BCCI. The BCCI officially terminated the franchise in October, and the league reverted to eight teams.

In June 2015, the two-time champions Chennai Super Kings and the inaugural season champions Rajasthan Royals were suspended for two seasons following their involvement in a spot-fixing and betting scandal. The two teams were replaced for two seasons by Rising Pune Supergiant and Gujarat Lions, based in Pune and Rajkot, respectively.

Due to the COVID-19 pandemic, the venue for the 2020 season was moved and games were played in the United Arab Emirates. In August 2021, the BCCI announced that two new franchises, based in two of six shortlisted cities, would join the league in the 2022 season. In closed bidding held in October, the RPSG Group and CVC Capital won the bids for the teams, paying ₹7,000 crore (US$750 million) and ₹5,200 crore (US$560 million), respectively. The teams were subsequently named Lucknow Super Giants and Gujarat Titans.

Several IPL franchise owners have expanded their business by acquiring teams in other franchise leagues, such as the West Indies' Caribbean Premier League (CPL), South Africa's SA20, the UAE's International League T20 (ILT20) and the USA's Major League Cricket (MLC).

In 2023, owners of three existing IPL teams – Mumbai Indians, Delhi Capitals and Royal Challengers Bengaluru secured the rights for the homonymous franchises in the Women's Premier League.

In addition to these acquisitions, Delhi Capitals also bought a stake in MLC's Seattle Orcas.

In 2025, stakes in teams from The Hundred became available. RPSG Group (Lucknow Super Giants) bought a 70% stake in Manchester Originals for around £81m. Reliance Industries (Mumbai Indians) bought a 49% stake in the Oval Invincibles for £60m, renaming the team MI London in December 2025. Yorkshire sold 100% of Northern Superchargers to Sun Group (Sunrisers Hyderabad) for £100m, before announcing the team would be known as Sunrisers Leeds in November 2025. The GMR Group (Delhi Capitals) had already acquired Hampshire in a 2024 deal, including the club's 51% stake in the Southern Brave and bought the remaining 49% for around £48m.

(India) IPL (Men's)	(India) WPL (Women's)	(England) (Wales) The Hundred (Men's & Women's)	(England) (Wales) Domestic Cricket (Men's & Women's)	(South Africa) SA20 (Men's)	(United Arab Emirates) ILT20 (Men's)	(Cricket West Indies) CPL (Men's) & WCPL (Women's)	(United States) MLC (Men's)
Chennai Super Kings				Joburg Super Kings			Texas Super Kings
Delhi Capitals	Delhi Capitals	Southern Brave	Hampshire; Hampshire Women	Pretoria Capitals	Dubai Capitals		Seattle Orcas (Note: Denotes minority stakes)
Gujarat Titans							
Kolkata Knight Riders					Abu Dhabi Knight Riders	Trinbago Knight Riders; Trinbago Knight Riders Women	Los Angeles Knight Riders
Lucknow Super Giants		Manchester Super Giants		Durban's Super Giants			
Mumbai Indians	Mumbai Indians	MI London		MI Cape Town	MI Emirates		MI New York
Punjab Kings						Saint Lucia Kings (Note: Men's team only)	
Rajasthan Royals				Paarl Royals		Barbados Tridents; Barbados Tridents Women	
Royal Challengers Bengaluru	Royal Challengers Bengaluru						
Sunrisers Hyderabad		Sunrisers Leeds		Sunrisers Eastern Cape			

== Organization ==
The IPL's headquarters are located in the Cricket Centre, next to the Wankhede Stadium in Churchgate, Mumbai. The Governing Council is responsible for the league's functions, including the organization of tournaments. As of March 2025, its members included:

- Arun Singh Dhumal – Chairman
- Devajit Saikia – Honorary Secretary, BCCI, Member
- Prabhtej Singh Bhatia – Honorary Treasurer, BCCI, Member
- Avishek Dalmiya – Member
- Vankina Chamundeswaranath – Indian Cricketers' Association's representative, Member
- CM Sane – CAG Nominee, Member

=== Prize money ===
The 2022 season of the IPL offered total prize money of ₹46.5 crore (equivalent to ₹54 crore or US$5.7 million in 2026), with the winning team netting ₹20 crore (equivalent to ₹23 crore or US$2.5 million in 2026) and the second-placed team ₹13 crore (equivalent to ₹15 crore or US$1.6 million in 2026). League rules mandate that half of any prize money must be distributed among the franchise's players. Royal Challengers Bengaluru won their first IPL title in 2025, receiving ₹20 crore, while runners-up Punjab Kings earned ₹12 crore.

== Rules and format ==
The IPL has several rules which vary from the established laws of cricket or those used in other Twenty20 leagues:

- IPL games incorporate television timeouts. Each team is given a two-and-a-half-minute "strategic time-out" during each innings. One must be taken by the bowling team between the conclusion of the 6th and 9th overs and the other by the batting team between the end of the 13th and 16th overs. A penalty may be imposed if umpires find teams misusing this privilege.
- Since the 2018 season, the Decision Review System (DRS) has been used in all IPL matches, allowing each team two opportunities in each innings to review an on-field umpire's decision. From the 2023 season, this was extended to allow the review of wides and no-balls.
- If the bowling team does not complete its overs in the allocated time, it may place only four fielders outside of the fielding restrictions circle for the remainder of the innings, or the match referee may impose financial sanctions on the bowling team after the match, with players fined a proportion of their match fee.
- Teams can use a substitute, termed an "impact player", from a list of five players named as possible substitutes. The substitution can be made before the start of the innings, when a wicket falls, when a batter retires or at the end of an over. Both teams can introduce a substitute once per match.
- Teams can declare their playing eleven to the match referee before or after the toss.
- A five-run penalty is imposed if a fielder or wicket-keeper makes an unfair movement while the bowler is bowling and the ball is designated as dead ball.
- Teams can include a maximum of four overseas players in their playing eleven. If a team wants an overseas player as impact player, then it must include a maximum of three overseas players in their playing eleven.
- Squads can include a maximum of 25 players, including up to eight overseas players.
- Since the 2024 season, bowlers have been allowed to deliver two bouncers an over. This change in playing conditions was trialled during the 2023–24 Syed Mushtaq Ali Trophy, India's domestic T20 tournament.

== Teams ==
All 10 IPL teams in the cities they are based in

The IPL began in 2008 IPL with eight teams. Over the years, the league saw several team changes. Deccan Chargers, were terminated in 2012 due to financial issues and were replaced by Sunrisers Hyderabad in 2013. Kochi Tuskers Kerala debuted in 2011 but lasted only one season before being terminated for contract breaches. Pune Warriors India participated from 2011 IPL to 2013 IPL but withdrew due to financial disputes. In 2016, Chennai Super Kings (CSK) and Rajasthan Royals (RR) were suspended for two years due to the 2013 betting scandal, leading to the temporary inclusion of Rising Pune Supergiant and Gujarat Lions, both of which played in 2016 IPL and 2017 IPL before being dissolved when CSK and RR returned in 2018 IPL. In 2022 IPL, the league expanded again with the introduction of Gujarat Titans and Lucknow Super Giants, making it a ten-team tournament. Over time, some teams underwent rebranding, such as Delhi Daredevils becoming Delhi Capitals in 2019 and Kings XI Punjab rebranding as Punjab Kings in 2021. Chennai Super Kings and Mumbai Indians remain the most successful franchises, winning five IPL titles each. As of the 2025 season, the league consists of 10 teams.

Team	City	State	Home ground	Debut	Captain	Head coach	Owner(s)	Ref
Chennai Super Kings	Chennai	Tamil Nadu	M. A. Chidambaram Stadium	2008	Ruturaj Gaikwad	Zaheer Khan	Chennai Super Kings Cricket Limited (100%)	
Delhi Capitals	New Delhi	Delhi	Arun Jaitley Stadium	2008	Axar Patel	Sourav Ganguly	GMR Group (50%); JSW Group (50%)	
Gujarat Titans	Ahmedabad	Gujarat	Narendra Modi Stadium	2022	Shubman Gill	Ashish Nehra	Torrent Group (67%); CVC Capital (33%)	
Kolkata Knight Riders	Kolkata	West Bengal	Eden Gardens	2008	Vacant	Abhishek Nayar	Shah Rukh Khan (55%); Mehta Group (45%)	
Lucknow Super Giants	Lucknow	Uttar Pradesh	Ekana Stadium	2022	Vacant	Justin Langer	RP-Sanjiv Goenka Group (100%)	
Mumbai Indians	Mumbai	Maharashtra	Wankhede Stadium	2008	Vacant	Kieron Pollard	Reliance Industries (100%)	
Punjab Kings	New Chandigarh	Punjab	Maharaja Yadavindra Singh Stadium	2008	Shreyas Iyer	Ricky Ponting	Mohit Burman (48%); Ness Wadia (23%); Preity Zinta (23%); Karan Paul (6%)	
Rajasthan Royals	Jaipur	Rajasthan	Sawai Mansingh Stadium	2008	Riyan Parag	Kumar Sangakkara	Lakshmi Mittal (75%); Adar Poonawalla (18%); Manoj Badale (7%)	
Royal Challengers Bengaluru	Bengaluru	Karnataka	M. Chinnaswamy Stadium	2008	Rajat Patidar	Andy Flower	Bolt Ventures (35%); Aditya Birla Group (27%); The Times Group (25%); Blackstone Inc. (13%)	
Sunrisers Hyderabad	Hyderabad	Telangana	Rajiv Gandhi Stadium	2013	Pat Cummins	Daniel Vettori	Sun Group (100%)	

=== Defunct teams ===
Team	City	State	Home ground	Debut	Dissolved	Owner(s)
Deccan Chargers	Hyderabad	Andhra Pradesh	Rajiv Gandhi Stadium	2008	2012	Deccan Chronicle (100%)
Kochi Tuskers Kerala	Kochi	Kerala	Jawaharlal Nehru Stadium	2011	2012	Rendezvous Sports World (100%)
Pune Warriors India	Pune	Maharashtra	MCA Stadium	2011	2013	Sahara India Pariwar (100%)
Rising Pune Supergiant	Pune	Maharashtra	MCA Stadium	2016	2018	RP-Sanjiv Goenka Group (100%)
Gujarat Lions	Rajkot	Gujarat	Niranjan Shah Stadium	2016	2018	Intex Technologies (100%)

=== Timeline of teams ===
Present teams Former teams Suspended

== Squads ==
A team can acquire players through the annual player auction, trading with other teams during trading windows, and signing replacements for unavailable players.

=== Player acquisition ===
For the 2025 IPL season, the total salary cap for each team is ₹120 crore. Each team must spend at least 75% of their total salary cap. Each squad must have a minimum of 18 players, a maximum of 25 players and a maximum of 8 overseas players.

==== Auction ====
Before the auction, teams are permitted to retain a select number of players for the following season. The rules for retaining players are determined by the league prior to each auction. The salaries of retained players are deducted from the team's salary cap prior to the auction. These players do not participate in the auction and merely continue with their current franchise.

The auction usually takes place in the winter months, in the middle of the IPL's offseason. Players who are not retained, and players who were not attached to a team in the previous tournament, can enter the auction. Each player signs up for the auction, sets their base price and plays for the highest-bidding franchise. Once purchased, the final bid determines the player's salary for that season, and the amount is deducted from the salary cap. Unsold players at the auction can become replacement signings for injured or unavailable players.

The league holds an auction every year, but every 3 years the league will hold a 'mega auction'. At this mega auction, teams can only retain a small number of players (6 players at the most recent mega auction) and are required to release a majority of their squad to the auction pool. This system is designed to ensure parity between teams as it forces them to rebuild their squads at regular intervals. Non-mega auctions, where teams can retain a high number of players, are often called 'mini-auctions'.

If a team wants to retain a player who does not want to be retained, the player can request to be traded or released into the auction pool. However, the team has the final say in whether or not to trade or release them. The exception to this is at a mega auction, when the player can demand to be released into the auction pool even if the team intends to retain them.

==== Trades ====
Trades require player consent, and any contract differences are covered by the franchise. There are typically three trading windows: two before the auction and one before the tournament. No trading is allowed outside these windows or during the tournament, but replacements can be signed before or during the IPL.

=== Contracts and salaries ===
Other notable rules, as of the 2024 season, include:

- The salary cap of the entire squad have been allotted a purse of ₹120 crore each.
- Under-19 players cannot be picked unless they have previously played first-class or List A cricket.

Player contracts run for one year but can be extended by one or two years if the franchises take up the option. Since the 2014 season, player contracts have been denominated in the Indian rupee, before which the contracts were in the US dollar. Overseas players can be remunerated in the currency of the player's choice, at the exchange rate on either the contract due date or the actual payment date. Before the 2014 season, Indian domestic players were not included in the player auction pool. They could be signed up by franchises at a discrete amount while a fixed sum of ₹10 lakh (US$11,000) to ₹30 lakh (US$32,000) would be deducted per signing from the franchise's salary purse. This received significant opposition from franchise owners, who complained richer franchises were "luring players with under-the-table deals." The IPL later decided to include domestic players in the player auction.

The BCCI give 10% of foreign players' salaries to their country's national cricket board.

Based on a 2024 report by Forbes India, the average IPL salary among the top 10 highest-paid players is ₹12.37 crore, the second-highest of sports leagues in the world. Because players in the IPL are contracted only for the duration of the tournament – less than two months – the weekly IPL salaries are extrapolated pro data to obtain an average annual salary, unlike other sports leagues in which players are contracted by a single team for the entire year.

According to a report by The Telegraph, IPL players are paid 18% of the revenue, which is the lowest amount compared to other major sports leagues, in which players receive at least 50% of the revenue. The Federation of International Cricketers' Associations said that IPL players must be paid fairly.

Here is a table listing the most expensive player acquisitions in each Indian Premier League (IPL) season, along with their respective teams and purchase prices.

List of most expensive player in IPL Auction each year
Year	Auction Location	Player	Nationality	Team	Price INR	Ref.
2008	Mumbai	MS Dhoni	India	Chennai Super Kings	9.5 crore	
2009	Goa	Kevin Pietersen	England	Royal Challengers Bangalore	9.8 crore	
2009	Goa	Andrew Flintoff	England	Chennai Super Kings	9.8 crore	
2010	Bengaluru	Shane Bond	New Zealand	Kolkata Knight Riders	4.8 crore	
2010	Bengaluru	Kieron Pollard	West Indies	Mumbai Indians	4.8 crore	
2011	Bengaluru	Gautam Gambhir	India	Kolkata Knight Riders	14.9 crore	
2012	Chennai	Ravindra Jadeja	India	Chennai Super Kings	12.8 crore	
2013	Chennai	Glenn Maxwell	Australia	Mumbai Indians	6.3 crore	
2014	Dubai	Yuvraj Singh	India	Royal Challengers Bangalore	14 crore	
2015	Bengaluru	Yuvraj Singh	India	Delhi Daredevils	16 crore	
2016	Bengaluru	Shane Watson	Australia	Royal Challengers Bangalore	9.5 crore	
2017	Bengaluru	Ben Stokes	England	Rising Pune Supergiant	14.5 crore	
2018	Bengaluru	Ben Stokes	England	Rajasthan Royals	12.5 crore	
2019	Jaipur	Varun Chakravarthy	India	Kings XI Punjab	8.4 crore	
2020	Kolkata	Pat Cummins	Australia	Kolkata Knight Riders	15.5 crore	
2021	Chennai	Chris Morris	South Africa	Rajasthan Royals	16.25 crore	
2022	Bengaluru	Ishan Kishan	India	Mumbai Indians	15.25 crore	
2023	Kochi	Sam Curran	England	Punjab Kings	18.5 crore	
2024	Dubai	Mitchell Starc	Australia	Kolkata Knight Riders	24.75 crore	
2025	Jeddah	Rishabh Pant	India	Lucknow Super Giants	27 crore	
2026	Abu Dhabi	Cameron Green	Australia	Kolkata Knight Riders	25.25 crore	

== Tournament results ==
Year	Final			Venue	Player of the Season
Year	Winner	Result	Runners up	Venue	Player of the Season
(India) 2008	Rajasthan Royals; 164/7 (20 overs)	RR won by 3 wickets Scorecard	Chennai Super Kings; 163/5 (20 overs)	DY Patil Stadium, Navi Mumbai	Shane Watson (RR)
(South Africa) 2009	Deccan Chargers; 143/6 (20 overs)	DC won by 6 runs Scorecard	Royal Challengers Bangalore; 137/9 (20 overs)	Wanderers Stadium, Johannesburg	Adam Gilchrist (DC)
(India) 2010	Chennai Super Kings; 168/5 (20 overs)	CSK won by 22 runs Scorecard	Mumbai Indians; 146/9 (20 overs)	DY Patil Stadium, Navi Mumbai	Sachin Tendulkar (MI)
(India) 2011	Chennai Super Kings; 205/5 (20 overs)	CSK won by 58 runs Scorecard	Royal Challengers Bangalore; 147/8 (20 overs)	M. A. Chidambaram Stadium, Chennai	Chris Gayle (RCB)
(India) 2012	Kolkata Knight Riders; 192/5 (19.4 overs)	KKR won by 5 wickets Scorecard	Chennai Super Kings; 190/3 (20 overs)	M. A. Chidambaram Stadium, Chennai	Sunil Narine (KKR)
(India) 2013	Mumbai Indians; 148/9 (20 overs)	MI won by 23 runs Scorecard	Chennai Super Kings; 125/9 (20 overs)	Eden Gardens, Kolkata	Shane Watson (RR)
(India) (United Arab Emirates) 2014	Kolkata Knight Riders; 200/7 (19.3 overs)	KKR won by 3 wickets Scorecard	Kings XI Punjab; 199/4 (20 overs)	M. Chinnaswamy Stadium, Bengaluru	Glenn Maxwell (KXIP)
(India) 2015	Mumbai Indians; 202/5 (20 overs)	MI won by 41 runs Scorecard	Chennai Super Kings; 161/8 (20 overs)	Eden Gardens, Kolkata	Andre Russell (KKR)
(India) 2016	Sunrisers Hyderabad; 208/7 (20 overs)	SRH won by 8 runs Scorecard	Royal Challengers Bangalore; 200/7 (20 overs)	M. Chinnaswamy Stadium, Bengaluru	Virat Kohli (RCB)
(India) 2017	Mumbai Indians; 129/8 (20 overs)	MI won by 1 run Scorecard	Rising Pune Supergiant; 128/6 (20 overs)	Rajiv Gandhi Stadium, Hyderabad	Ben Stokes (RPS)
(India) 2018	Chennai Super Kings; 181/2 (18.3 overs)	CSK won by 8 wickets Scorecard	Sunrisers Hyderabad; 178/6 (20 overs)	Wankhede Stadium, Mumbai	Sunil Narine (KKR)
(India) 2019	Mumbai Indians; 149/8 (20 overs)	MI won by 1 run Scorecard	Chennai Super Kings; 148/7 (20 overs)	Rajiv Gandhi Stadium, Hyderabad	Andre Russell (KKR)
(United Arab Emirates) 2020	Mumbai Indians; 157/5 (18.4 overs)	MI won by 5 wickets Scorecard	Delhi Capitals; 156/7 (20 overs)	Dubai International Stadium, Dubai	Jofra Archer (RR)
(India) (United Arab Emirates) 2021	Chennai Super Kings; 192/3 (20 overs)	CSK won by 27 runs Scorecard	Kolkata Knight Riders; 165/9 (20 overs)	Dubai International Stadium, Dubai	Harshal Patel (RCB)
(India) 2022	Gujarat Titans; 133/3 (18.1 overs)	GT won by 7 wickets Scorecard	Rajasthan Royals; 130/9 (20 overs)	Narendra Modi Stadium, Ahmedabad	Jos Buttler (RR)
(India) 2023	Chennai Super Kings; 171/5 (15 overs)	CSK won by 5 wickets (DLS); Scorecard	Gujarat Titans; 214/4 (20 overs)	Narendra Modi Stadium, Ahmedabad	Shubman Gill (GT)
(India) 2024	Kolkata Knight Riders; 114/2 (10.3 overs)	KKR won by 8 wickets Scorecard	Sunrisers Hyderabad; 113/10 (18.3 overs)	M. A. Chidambaram Stadium, Chennai	Sunil Narine (KKR)
(India) 2025	Royal Challengers Bengaluru; 190/9 (20 overs)	RCB won by 6 runs Scorecard	Punjab Kings; 184/7 (20 overs)	Narendra Modi Stadium, Ahmedabad	Suryakumar Yadav (MI)
(India) 2026	Royal Challengers Bengaluru; 161/5 (18 overs)	RCB won by 5 wickets Scorecard	Gujarat Titans; 155/8 (20 overs)	Narendra Modi Stadium, Ahmedabad	Vaibhav Sooryavanshi (RR)

== Performance by teams ==
Chennai Super Kings and Mumbai Indians have each won five titles, the most in the tournament. Kolkata Knight Riders have won three titles, Royal Challengers Bengaluru have won two titles, while Rajasthan Royals, Deccan Chargers, Sunrisers Hyderabad and Gujarat Titans have each won a single title. The reigning champions are the Royal Challengers Bengaluru, who defeated the Gujarat Titans by 5 wickets in the 2026 IPL final to secure their second consecutive title.

Team	Winners	Runners up	Playoffs	Seasons
Chennai Super Kings	5 (2010, 2011, 2018, 2021, 2023)	5 (2008, 2012, 2013, 2015, 2019)	12	17
Mumbai Indians	5 (2013, 2015, 2017, 2019, 2020)	1 (2010)	11	19
Kolkata Knight Riders	3 (2012, 2014, 2024)	1 (2021)	8	19
Royal Challengers Bengaluru	2 (2025, 2026)	3 (2009, 2011, 2016)	11	19
Sunrisers Hyderabad	1 (2016)	2 (2018, 2024)	8	14
Gujarat Titans	1 (2022)	2 (2023, 2026)	4	5
Rajasthan Royals	1 (2008)	1 (2022)	7	17
Deccan Chargers ^{†}	1 (2009)		2	5
Punjab Kings		2 (2014, 2025)	3	19
Delhi Capitals		1 (2020)	6	19
Rising Pune Supergiant ^{†}		1 (2017)	1	2
Lucknow Super Giants			2	5
Gujarat Lions ^{†}			1	2
Pune Warriors India ^{†}			–	3
Kochi Tuskers Kerala ^{†}			–	1

^{†} Team now defunct

=== Seasons ===
Team	2008	2009	2010	2011	2012	2013	2014	2015	2016	2017	2018	2019	2020	2021	2022	2023	2024	2025	2026
Chennai Super Kings	RU	SF	C	C	RU	RU	3rd	RU	Suspended		C	RU	7th	C	9th	C	5th	10th	8th
Delhi Capitals	SF	SF	5th	10th	3rd	9th	8th	7th	6th	6th	8th	3rd	RU	3rd	5th	9th	6th	5th	6th
Gujarat Titans	–														C	RU	8th	4th	RU
Kolkata Knight Riders	6th	8th	7th	4th	C	7th	C	5th	4th	3rd	3rd	5th	5th	RU	7th	7th	C	8th	7th
Lucknow Super Giants	–														4th	4th	7th	7th	10th
Mumbai Indians	5th	7th	RU	3rd	4th	C	4th	C	5th	C	5th	C	C	5th	10th	3rd	10th	3rd	9th
Punjab Kings	SF	5th	8th	5th	6th	6th	RU	8th	8th	5th	7th	6th	6th	6th	6th	8th	9th	RU	5th
Rajasthan Royals	C	6th	7th	6th	7th	3rd	5th	4th	Suspended		4th	7th	8th	7th	RU	5th	3rd	9th	3rd
Royal Challengers Bengaluru	7th	RU	3rd	RU	5th	5th	7th	3rd	RU	8th	6th	8th	4th	4th	3rd	6th	4th	C	C
Sunrisers Hyderabad	–					4th	6th	6th	C	4th	RU	4th	3rd	8th	8th	10th	RU	6th	4th
Defunct Teams
Deccan Chargers	8th	C	4th	7th	8th	–													
Kochi Tuskers Kerala	–			8th	–														
Pune Warriors India	–			9th	9th	8th	–												
Gujarat Lions	–								3rd	7th	–								
Rising Pune Supergiant	–								7th	RU	–								

- Active teams are listed alphabetically. Defunct teams are listed by order of entry to the league, then alphabetically.

Champions
Runners up
Team won the 3rd place playoff; only took place in 2010
Team qualified for the playoffs or semi-final

=== Positions each season ===
Position	Season																		
Position	2008	2009	2010	2011	2012	2013	2014	2015	2016	2017	2018	2019	2020	2021	2022	2023	2024	2025	2026
1st	RR	DD	MI	RCB	DD	CSK	KXIP	CSK	GL	MI	SRH	MI	MI	DC	GT	GT	KKR	PBKS	RCB
2nd	KXIP	CSK	DEC	CSK	KKR	MI	KKR	MI	RCB	RPS	CSK	CSK	DC	CSK	RR	CSK	SRH	RCB	GT
3rd	CSK	RCB	CSK	MI	MI	RR	CSK	RCB	SRH	SRH	KKR	DC	SRH	RCB	LSG	LSG	RR	GT	SRH
4th	DD	DEC	RCB	KKR	CSK	SRH	MI	RR	KKR	KKR	RR	SRH	RCB	KKR	RCB	MI	RCB	MI	RR
5th	MI	KXIP	DD	KXIP	RCB	RCB	RR	KKR	MI	KXIP	MI	KKR	KKR	MI	DC	RR	CSK	DC	PBKS
6th	KKR	RR	KKR	RR	KXIP	KXIP	SRH	SRH	DD	DD	RCB	KXIP	KXIP	PBKS	PBKS	RCB	DC	SRH	DC
7th	RCB	MI	RR	DEC	RR	KKR	RCB	DD	RPS	GL	KXIP	RR	CSK	RR	KKR	KKR	LSG	LSG	KKR
8th	DEC	KKR	KXIP	KTK	DEC	PWI	DD	KXIP	KXIP	RCB	DD	RCB	RR	SRH	SRH	PBKS	GT	KKR	CSK
9th	—N/a			PWI	PWI	DD	—N/a								CSK	DC	PBKS	RR	MI
10th	—N/a			DD	—N/a		—N/a								MI	SRH	MI	CSK	LSG

Champions
Runners up
Team won the 3rd place playoff; only took place in 2010
Team qualified for the playoffs or semi-final

=== All time standings ===
Teams are ordered by best result, then by winning percentage, then alphabetically:

Team	Appearances			Best result	Statistics						
Team	Total	First	Latest	Best result	Played	Won	Lost	Tied+W	Tied+L	NR	Win%
Chennai Super Kings	17	2008	2026	Champions (2010, 2011, 2018, 2021, 2023)	267	148	116	0	1	2	55.84
Mumbai Indians	19	2008	2026	Champions (2013, 2015, 2017, 2019, 2020)	291	155	132	2	2	0	53.95
Kolkata Knight Riders	19	2008	2026	Champions (2012, 2014, 2024)	279	140	131	2	3	3	51.44
Royal Challengers Bengaluru	19	2008	2026	Champions (2025, 2026)	287	143	137	2	1	4	51.23
Gujarat Titans	5	2022	2026	Champions (2022)	77	47	30	0	0	0	61.03
Rajasthan Royals	17	2008	2026	Champions (2008)	252	123	122	2	2	3	50.20
Sunrisers Hyderabad	14	2013	2026	Champions (2016)	211	102	104	1	3	1	49.04
Punjab Kings	19	2008	2026	Runners-up (2014, 2025)	277	126	145	3	1	2	46.90
Delhi Capitals	19	2008	2026	Runners-up (2020)	280	125	147	4	1	3	46.57
Lucknow Super Giants	5	2022	2026	Eliminator (2022, 2023)	72	34	36	0	1	1	47.88
Deccan Chargers	5	2008	2012	Champions (2009)	75	29	46	0	0	0	38.66
Rising Pune Supergiant	2	2016	2017	Runners-up (2017)	30	15	15	0	0	0	50.00
Gujarat Lions	2	2016	2017	Qualifier 2 (2016)	30	13	16	0	1	0	43.33
Kochi Tuskers Kerala	1	2011	2011	Group Stage (2011)	14	6	8	0	0	0	42.85
Pune Warriors India	3	2011	2013	Group Stage (2011, 2012, 2013)	46	12	33	0	0	1	26.08

Team now defunct
Source: ESPNCricinfo (Last updated: 31 May 2026)

Notes:

- Tie+W and Tie+L indicates matches tied and then won or lost by super over
- The result percentage excludes no results and counts ties (irrespective of a tiebreaker) as half a win

== Records and statistics ==
=== Most wins ===
Players with four or more Indian Premier League titles.

Wins	Player	Franchise(s)
6	(India) Ambati Rayudu	Mumbai Indians (2013, 2015, 2017); Chennai Super Kings (2018, 2021, 2023)
6	(India) Rohit Sharma	Deccan Chargers (2009); Mumbai Indians (2013, 2015, 2017, 2019, 2020)
5	(India) Jasprit Bumrah	Mumbai Indians (2013, 2015, 2017, 2019, 2020)
5	(Cricket West Indies) Kieron Pollard	Mumbai Indians (2013, 2015, 2017, 2019, 2020)
5	(India) MS Dhoni	Chennai Super Kings (2010, 2011, 2018, 2021, 2023)
5	(India) Hardik Pandya	Mumbai Indians (2015, 2017, 2019, 2020); Gujarat Titans (2022)
5	(India) Krunal Pandya	Mumbai Indians (2017, 2019, 2020); Royal Challengers Bengaluru (2025, 2026)
5	(India) Aditya Tare	Mumbai Indians (2013, 2015, 2019, 2020); Sunrisers Hyderabad (2016)
4	(India) Harbhajan Singh	Mumbai Indians (2013, 2015, 2017); Chennai Super Kings (2018)
4	(Australia) Josh Hazlewood	Mumbai Indians (2015); Chennai Super Kings (2021); Royal Challengers Bengaluru (2025, 2026)
4	(India) Ravindra Jadeja	Rajasthan Royals (2008); Chennai Super Kings (2018, 2021, 2023)
4	(India) Karn Sharma	Sunrisers Hyderabad (2016); Mumbai Indians (2017); Chennai Super Kings (2018, 2021)
4	(Sri Lanka) Lasith Malinga	Mumbai Indians (2013, 2015, 2017, 2019)
4	(New Zealand) Mitchell McClenaghan	Mumbai Indians (2015, 2017, 2019, 2020)
4	(India) Suresh Raina	Chennai Super Kings (2010, 2011, 2018, 2021)
4	(India) Suryakumar Yadav	Mumbai Indians (2013, 2019, 2020); Kolkata Knight Riders (2014)

As of 31 May 2026

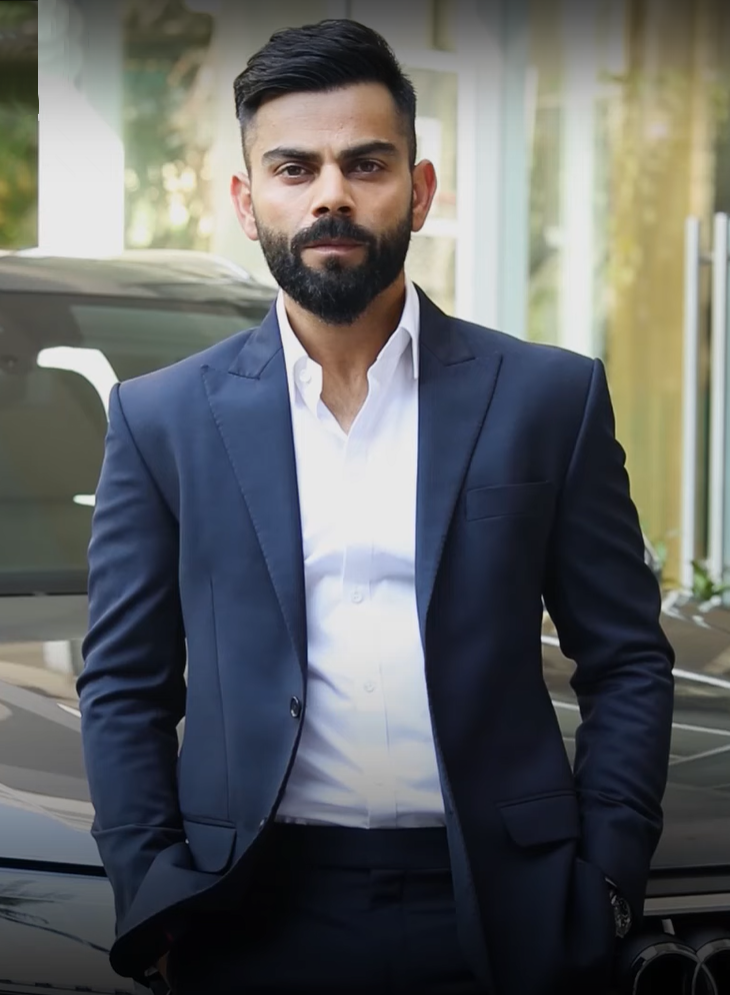
Virat Kohli is the highest run-scorer in IPL.

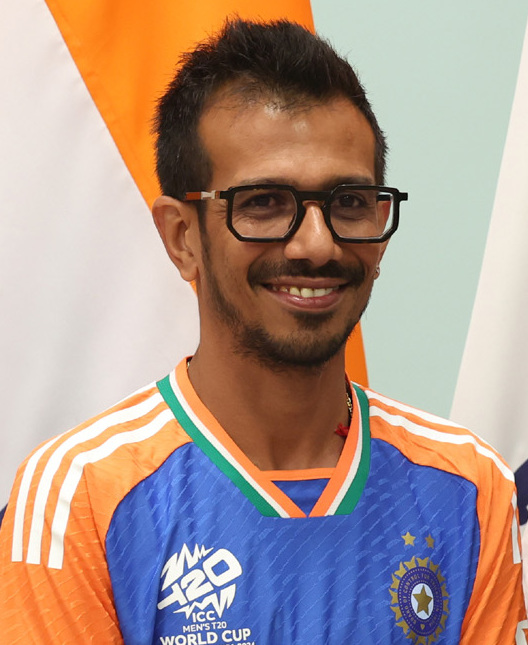
Yuzvendra Chahal is the highest wicket-taker in IPL.

Batting records
Most runs	Virat Kohli (RCB)	9,336
Most fours	Virat Kohli (RCB)	844
Most sixes	Chris Gayle (KKR/PBKS/RCB)	357
Most centuries	Virat Kohli (RCB)	9
Most half-centuries	Virat Kohli (RCB)	68
Most runs in a season	Virat Kohli (RCB)	973 (2016)
Best strike rate	Tim David (MI/RCB)	177.07
Highest score	Chris Gayle (RCB)	175* vs Pune Warriors India (23 April 2013)
Highest partnership	Virat Kohli and AB de Villiers (RCB)	229 vs Gujarat Lions (14 May 2016)
Bowling records
Most wickets	Yuzvendra Chahal (PBKS/MI/RCB/RR)	233
Best bowling figures	Alzarri Joseph (MI)	6/12 vs Sunrisers Hyderabad (6 April 2019)
Most wickets in a season	Harshal Patel (RCB)	32 (2021)
Most wickets in a season	Dwayne Bravo (CSK)	32 (2013)
Fielding records
Most dismissals as a wicket-keeper	MS Dhoni (CSK/RPS)	201
Most catches as a fielder	Virat Kohli (RCB)	126
Team records
Highest total	Sunrisers Hyderabad	287/3 (20) vs Royal Challengers Bengaluru (15 April 2024)
Lowest total	Royal Challengers Bengaluru	49 (9.4) vs Kolkata Knight Riders (23 April 2017)

=== Most appearances ===
As of 22 May 2026

Rank	Player	Team	Years active	Apps	Runs	Wkts
1	**Virat Kohli**	RCB	2008–present	283	9,336	4
2	**Rohit Sharma**	DCH, MI	2008–present	280	7,329	15
3	**MS Dhoni**	CSK, RPS	2008–present	278	5,439	–
4	**Ravindra Jadeja**	CSK, GL, KTK, RR	2008–present	264	3,450	178
5	Dinesh Karthik	DD, GL, KKR, KXIP, MI, RCB	2008–2024	257	4,842	–
6	Shikhar Dhawan	DD, DCH, MI, PBKS, SRH	2008–2024	222	6,769	4
7	Ravichandran Ashwin	CSK, DC, KXIP, RR, RPS	2009–2025	221	833	187
8	**Ajinkya Rahane**	CSK, DC, KKR, MI, RPS, RR	2008–present	211	5,304	1
9	Suresh Raina	CSK, GL	2008–2021	205	5,528	25
10	Robin Uthappa	CSK, KKR, PWI, RR, RCB	2008–2022	205	4,952	–

- Source: ESPNcricinfo
- Currently active IPL players appear in **boldface**.

== End-of-season awards ==
=== Prize money ===
Starting with the 2026 season, the distribution of the prize money is as follows:

- Winning team: ₹20 crore (US$2.5 million)
- Runner-up team: ₹13 crore (US$1.3 million)
- Third-place team: ₹7 crore (US$736,000)
- Fourth-place team: ₹6.5 crore (US$684,000)

=== Fair Play Award ===
The Fair Play Award is given to the team considered to have the best fair play record in the season. After each match, the two on-field umpires and the third umpire score the performance of both teams, with the highest-scoring team at the end of the season receiving the award.

=== Orange Cap ===
The Orange Cap is awarded to the highest run-scorer at the end of each season. It is an ongoing competition with the current highest run-scorer wearing the cap whilst fielding. The eventual winner keeps the cap for the season. Brendon McCullum was the first player to wear the Orange Cap and Shaun Marsh the inaugural winner of the award. Australian batsman David Warner has won the award three times, while Chris Gayle and Virat Kohli have each won it twice.

=== Purple Cap ===
The Purple Cap is awarded to the highest wicket-taker at the end of each season. It is an ongoing competition and the bowler who is the leading wicket-taker wears a purple cap whilst fielding. The eventual winner keeps the cap for the season. Bhuvneshwar Kumar and Dwayne Bravo are the only players to have won the award twice.

=== Most Valuable Player ===
The Most Valuable Player award, formerly called the "Man of the Tournament" until the 2012 season, is awarded using a ratings system introduced in 2013.

=== Emerging Player Award ===
The Emerging Player Award was presented to the best under-19 player in 2008 and the best under-23 player in 2009 and 2010. In 2011 and 2012, the award was known as "Rising Star of the Year," and in 2013 the "Best Young Player of the Season." Since 2014, the award has been called the Emerging Player of the Year.

== Finances ==
=== Title sponsorship ===
Title sponsorship fees
Sponsor	Period	Estimated annual sponsorship fee
DLF	2008–2012	₹40 crore (US$9 million)
Pepsi	2013–2015	₹79 crore (US$13 million)
Vivo	2016–2017	₹100 crore (US$15 million)
Vivo	2018–2019, 2021	₹440 crore (US$64 million)
Dream11	2020	₹222 crore (US$30 million)
Tata	2022–2023	₹335 crore (US$43 million)
Tata	2024–2028	₹500 crore (US$53 million)

From 2008 to 2012, the IPL title sponsor was DLF, a real estate developer, which bid ₹200 crore (US$21 million). After 2012, PepsiCo bought the rights for ₹397 crore (US$42 million) for five seasons, but terminated the deal in 2015, two years before expiry, due to the two-season suspension of the Chennai and Rajasthan franchises. The BCCI transferred the rights for those two seasons to Chinese smartphone manufacturer Vivo for ₹200 crore (US$21 million).

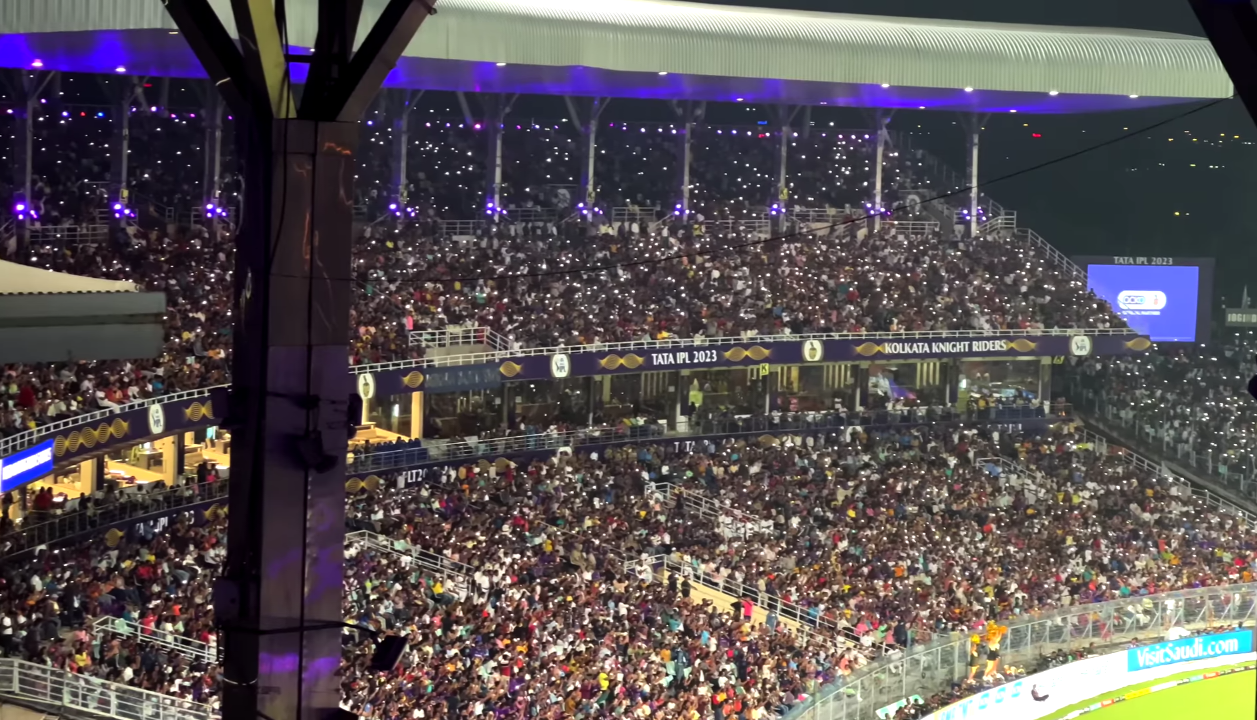
Crowd during a match of the 2023 IPL season in Kolkata

In 2017, Vivo retained the rights for 2018–22 with a winning bid of ₹2,199 crore (US$230 million). In August 2020, Vivo canceled the rights due to a military stand-off between India and China. The withdrawal was also a result of Vivo's market losses due to the COVID pandemic; Vivo intended to return as sponsor for the following three years. Dream11 became sponsors for 2020 for ₹222 crore (equivalent to ₹285 crore or US$30 million in 2026). Vivo returned for 2021 but withdrew again, and was replaced by the Tata Group for the next two seasons. InsideSport reported the BCCI would receive ₹498 crore (US$53 million) for the 2022–23 seasons from title sponsors. Vivo had agreed to pay a higher amount for the last two seasons of its contract due to the league's expansion from 2022. Due to the new deal's structure, Tata would pay ₹335 crore (US$36 million) per year while Vivo would pay the deficit of ₹163 crore (US$17 million). Aramco bought the sponsorship rights for the Orange and Purple Caps in 2022.

=== Payments to foreign national boards ===
The BCCI pays 10% of the auctioned value of players to their national cricket boards. In 2018, IPL chairman Rajiv Shukla said the IPL would double the amount paid to cricket boards that made their players available for an entire season. In 2022, the Australian Cricketers' Association expressed its unhappiness about this.

=== Brand value ===
The IPL tournament rapidly grew in value between 2016 and 2018. Experts valued it at US$4.2 billion in 2016, $5.3 billion in 2017 and $6.1 billion in 2018. A report from Duff & Phelps said a contributing factor was a television deal with Star India Private Limited, which engaged more viewers because the IPL was transmitted to regional channels in eight languages; under the previous deal, transmissions were limited to sports networks with English-language commentary.

In 2022, the IPL became a decacorn valued at US$11 billion, registering a 75% growth since 2020 when it was valued at $6.2 billion.

Brand value
Team	Year				
Team	2025	2024	2023	2022	2021
Team	Brand value	Brand value	Brand value	Brand value	Brand value
Royal Challengers Bengaluru	$269M	$117M	$70M	$68M	$50M
Mumbai Indians	$242M	$119M	$87M	$83M	$80M
Chennai Super Kings	$235M	$122M	$81M	$74M	$76M
Kolkata Knight Riders	$227M	$109M	$79M	$77M	$66M
Sunrisers Hyderabad	$154M	$85M	$48M	$49M	$52M
Delhi Capitals	$152M	$80M	$64M	$62M	$56M
Rajasthan Royals	$146M	$81M	$62M	$61M	$34M
Gujarat Titans	$142M	$69M	$65M	$47M	N/A
Punjab Kings	$141M	$68M	$45M	$45M	$36M
Lucknow Super Giants	$122M	$60M	$47M	$32M	N/A

In 2022, the BCCI took insurance of ₹5,000 crore (US$530 million) for the IPL. This policy involves all stakeholders, including broadcasters, ancillary services providers, and sponsors. The BCCI is covered in case of revenue losses due to weather, riots, and unforeseen events.

== Broadcasting ==
The IPL has been India's most-watched sports property; JioCinema estimated that an average of 620 million viewers watched part of the 2024 Indian Premier League overall, with at least 350 billion minutes streamed across the tournament. The 2025 final was seen on Star Sports by 169 million viewers, making it the most-watched cricket broadcast to-date on linear television.

Currently, domestic media rights are held by JioStar, under contracts originally awarded in 2022 to its corporate predecessors Disney Star and Viacom18; coverage is carried via its streaming service JioHotstar, and the Star Sports pay television networks. The main packages for domestic television and digital rights were collectively valued at around US$6.2 billion (more than double the value of the previous contract), causing the IPL to overtake the Premier League in English football as the second highest-valued sports media property worldwide, behind only the National Football League (US$111 billion).

The IPL's media rights were originally held from 2008 to 2017 by Sony Pictures Networks (domestic) and World Sport Group (international) under a ten-year contract valued at US$1.03 billion. Coverage was split between SPN channels such as Sony Max (which primarily carried coverage in the Hindi language), Sony Six (Hindi, Bengali, Tamil, Kannada and Telugu), and Sony ESPN (English). SPN also produced Extraaa Innings T20, an aftershow that combined post-match analysis with entertainment features such as celebrity guests and interviews.

The media rights were then held by Star India from 2018 to 2022, under a contract valued at US$2.55 billion—which, at the time, was the highest-valued broadcast rights contract in the history of cricket. Star Sports would hold the pay television rights, while Disney+ Hotstar held the digital rights. In 2022, Disney Star lost the digital rights to a consortium of Reliance Industries and Viacom18 (which would stream the IPL for free via their streaming service JioCinema), while maintaining the pay television rights for Star Sports. The loss of IPL rights notably contributed to Disney losing 2.4 million Disney+ subscribers worldwide in fiscal Q4 2022.

=== List of broadcasters ===
Territory	Channels	Years
India	Star Sports 1 Star Sports 1 Hindi; Star Sports 1 Kannada; Star Sports 1 Tamil; Star Sports 1 Telugu HD; Star Gold; Star Bharat; Star Utsav Movies; Star Jalsa Movies; Star Maa Movies; Star Suvarna Plus; Star Vijay Super; Colors Tamil; Asianet Movies	2024–2027
India	JioHotstar (Digital)	2024–2027
Afghanistan	ATN HD; ATN News HD	2024
Afghanistan	Ariana Television (Digital)	2024
Australia	Foxtel; Fox Cricket; Kayo Sports	2023–present
Australia	Kayo Freebies (Digital)	2023–present
Bangladesh	T Sports HD	2024
Bangladesh	T Sports APP	2024
Indonesia	Vidio (Digital)	2023
New Zealand	Sky Sport	2025–present
Nepal	Kantipur Max	2025–present
Pakistan	Tapmad APP	2024
Ireland	Sky Sports; DAZN	2023–present
United Kingdom	Sky Sports; DAZN	2023–present
South Africa	SuperSport	2023
Sri Lanka	Star Sports 1 Star Sports 1 HD; Star Sports 2 Star Sports Select HD 1 Star Sports Select HD 2	
Sri Lanka	Supreme TV	2023–present
Sri Lanka	SandBrix (Digital)	2025
United States	Willow TV	2023–present
Middle East and North Africa	Times Internet	2023
Sub-Saharan Africa	SuperSport	2021–present

== Controversies ==
=== Spot-fixing and betting cases ===
==== 2012 Indian Premier League spot-fixing and betting case ====
In the 2012 IPL spot-fixing case, the BCCI imposed a lifetime ban on Deccan Chargers player TP Sudhindra and suspended four other players. In a sting operation, Pune Warriors India player Mohnish Mishra was recorded alleging that IPL franchise owners paid players black money, over and above their salaries. Mishra later apologized for his "frivolous and incorrect statements".

==== 2013 Indian Premier League spot-fixing and betting case ====
In the 2013 IPL spot-fixing and betting case, Delhi police arrested Rajasthan Royals players Ajit Chandila, Ankeet Chavan and S. Sreesanth on charges of spot-fixing; they received lifetime bans from the BCCI. The police also arrested Gurunath Meiyappan, the team principal of Chennai Super Kings and son-in-law of then BCCI president N. Srinivasan, for illegally betting on IPL matches and passing team information to bookmakers. In 2015, the Lodha Committee, appointed by the Supreme Court of India, banned Rajasthan Royals and Chennai Super Kings for two years. Meiyappan and Rajasthan Royals co-owner Raj Kundra were found guilty of betting and banned from any involvement with the game.

=== Strategic timeouts ===
In the 2009 season, the IPL introduced the "strategic timeout", a seven-and-a-half minute break at the end of the tenth over in each innings. Teams and players, including Sachin Tendulkar, disapproved of it for interrupting the flow of play, while critics labelled it a "commercial use of an extended drinks break" as every 10-second advertisement slot was sold for over ₹5 lakh. The then-president of the IPL insisted that the break was intended to allow teams to strategise during the game. Following widespread criticism, in the 2010 season, the duration of the timeout was reduced to five minutes, split in two halves during each innings.

IPL stakeholders have described strategic timeouts as unavoidable, as they provide the BCCI with sponsorship revenue and allow broadcasters additional time for advertisements. In 2022, commentator Sunil Gavaskar said that strategic timeouts, among other factors, caused IPL matches to stretch to nearly 4 hours, instead of the stipulated time of 3 hours and 10 minutes.

=== Incidents with players ===
During the 2008 season, Mumbai Indians player Harbhajan Singh slapped S. Sreesanth at the end of a match, resulting in Harbhajan being fined and banned from the remaining games of the season. Years later, Harbhajan apologized to Sreesanth on television.

In 2010, the BCCI banned Ravindra Jadeja from the IPL for one year after he violated league guidelines by negotiating a more lucrative contract with other teams instead of renewing his contract with the Rajasthan Royals.

=== Team ownership controversies ===
In April 2010, IPL commissioner Lalit Modi revealed that Sunanda Pushkar, who was described at the time as a "close friend" of the Minister of State for External Affairs Shashi Tharoor, held sweat equity shares in Rendezvous Sports World (RSW), the proprietor of the newly auctioned franchise Kochi Tuskers Kerala. Since Tharoor had mentored RSW's successful bid for the Kochi franchise, members of his Indian National Congress party demanded his resignation. Pushkar gave up her 4.7% sweat equity estimated to be worth ₹70 crore, while Tharoor resigned over charges of conflict of interest and allegations that Pushkar was acting as a proxy for him. Tharoor married Pushkar in August later that year.

In April 2010, the BCCI president Shashank Manohar claimed in a press conference that the IPL Governing Council did not know the true owners of the Rajasthan Royals (RR) and Kings XI Punjab (KXIP). He stated that during the franchise bidding process, only Preity Zinta had initially come forward to bid for KXIP, but the franchise agreement was later signed by a different company in which she held no ownership stake. He cited similar irregularities in the bidding process for RR, adding that the BCCI's permission had not been sought before the owners of RR sold a part stake to Shilpa Shetty and Raj Kundra, and that the mandatory 5% share transfer fee had not been paid. Both franchises were briefly terminated in October 2010 over alleged violations of the franchise agreement, before the terminations were overturned by the Bombay High Court in December 2010.

In April 2010, former BCCI president A. C. Muthiah filed a Supreme Court petition against Chennai Super Kings (CSK) owner N. Srinivasan, claiming that the then-BCCI president Srinivasan altered BCCI's rules to allow himself to purchase an IPL team and that owning an IPL team was a case of conflict of interest. A few months later, Indian media, citing an alleged leaked e-mail, accused former IPL commissioner Lalit Modi of helping Srinivasan's team buy Andrew Flintoff in the 2009 player auction. During a hearing of the 2013 betting case in which Srinivasan's son-in-law and CSK's team principal Gurunath Meiyappan was suspended by the Lodha Committee, the Supreme Court criticized Srinivasan for owning an IPL team while serving as the BCCI president. As of 2024, Srinivasan's family was reported to exercise control over Chennai Super Kings Cricket through a significant ownership stake; his daughter Rupa Gurunath often appears in stadiums during CSK's games.

=== Slow over rates ===
Field umpires sometimes penalize teams by restricting them to having only four fielders outside the 30-yard area, or match referees penalize captains and team members by reducing their match fees, but these measures have not solved the problem. Games often run at a slow speed and finish late. During the 2024 season, Rishabh Pant, captain of Delhi Capitals, and Shubman Gill of Gujarat Titans were fined ₹12 lakhs each for their teams' slow over rates during matches against Chennai Super Kings. Millions of viewers feel that IPL matches should be fast-paced.

=== Security issues ===
Ahead of the 2009 season, the Indian government declined to provide security for the IPL, citing that central security forces would be engaged in the general elections. As a result, the BCCI shifted the season to South Africa. A similar decision by the Indian government in 2014, when the IPL again coincided with the general elections, led to the opening 20 matches being held in the United Arab Emirates, with the tournament returning to India on 2 May 2014.

On 9 May 2025, the 2025 season was suspended for one week during the India-Pakistan conflict. As several airports in North India were closed, the Indian Railways organized special Vande Bharat Express trains for players, support staff, commentators, production crew members, and operations staff on the request of the BCCI.

=== Exclusion of Pakistani and Bangladeshi players ===
Following the November 2008 terrorist attacks in Mumbai by Pakistan-based terrorist group Lashkar-e-Taiba, geopolitical tensions surged between India and Pakistan. The aftermath of the attack led to the exclusion of Pakistani players from playing in the IPL, as none of them were picked by any team during the 2009 IPL auction. While they had been selected by several teams for the inaugural IPL season in 2008, their contracts were terminated before the 2009 edition, and have been excluded for subsequent editions. Among the critics of the BCCI and IPL owners has been retired cricketer and former Pakistan prime minister Imran Khan, who stated that they "take it out on Pakistan players". He accused the BCCI of "arrogance" but also stated that "Pakistan should not worry about it". Certain Pakistani players, including Hasan Ali and Sohail Tanvir expressed disappointment about not getting an opportunity to be a part of the IPL. In addition to the exclusion of Pakistani players from the IPL, India refused to play with Pakistan in any bilateral series and pulled out from the 2009 series.

For the 2010 IPL season auction, as no franchise bid for any Pakistani player, it led to major protests in Pakistan. As a result of not being selected, several players such as Shahid Afridi and Abdul Razzaq expressed disappointment, while former leg spinner Abdul Qadir stated that Pakistan should form its own league. Subsequently, it led to the formation of Pakistan Super League, which had its first season in 2016.

During the 2025 IPL auction on 24 and 25 November 2024 at Jeddah, Saudi Arabia, 13 Bangladeshi players were registered, out of which 12 were auctioned. However, none of the players were sold, prompting a backlash from Bangladeshi fans and cricketers. After the auction concluded, the exclusion of Bangladeshi players was largely supported by Indians following the violence against Hindus in Bangladesh in the aftermath of resignation of Sheikh Hasina on 5 August 2024.

Following the 2026 IPL auction in December 2025 at Abu Dhabi, controversy arose after Kolkata Knight Riders bought Bangladeshi cricketer Mustafizur Rahman, due to the geopolitical tensions caused by the violence against Hindus and lynching of Dipu Chandra Das in December 2025. Following an outcry and widespread condemnation across India, the BCCI on 3 January 2026 requested the team to release Rahman. The incident led to the Bangladesh Cricket Board request the International Cricket Council to shift their matches against India in the 2026 Men's T20 World Cup, co-hosted by India and Sri Lanka, to be solely held in Sri Lanka, similar to that of Pakistan's. Due to unresolved disagreements between the ICC and BCB, the Bangladesh team was later officially replaced by the Scotland team.

== See also ==
- Cricket in India
- Sport in India – overview of Indian sports culture
- List of cricket leagues in India
- List of professional sports leagues in India
