= Mukesh Choudhary =

Indian cricketer (born 1996)

Personal information
- Born: 6 July 1996 (age 30); Pardodas, Rajasthan, India
- Batting: Left-handed
- Bowling: Left arm medium
- Role: Bowler

Domestic team information
- Years: Team
- 2017/18–present: Maharashtra
- 2022–present: Chennai Super Kings

Career statistics
Competition	FC	LA	T20
Matches	17	26	36
Runs scored	140	22	32
Batting average	11.66	4.40	10.66
100s/50s	0/0	0/0	0/0
Top score	25	14*	11*
Balls bowled	3,100	1,427	742
Wickets	60	37	48
Bowling average	29.60	37.37	23.62
5 wickets in innings	1	0	0
10 wickets in match	0	–	–
Best bowling	5/76	4/67	4/33
Catches/stumpings	4/–	8/–	4/–
- Source: ESPNcricinfo, 9 April 2025

Mukesh Choudhary (born 6 July 1996) is an Indian cricketer who plays for Maharashtra in domestic cricket and for Chennai Super Kings in the Indian Premier League. He made his first-class debut for Maharashtra in the 2017–18 Ranji Trophy on 9 November 2017. He made his List A debut on 7 October 2019, for Maharashtra in the 2019–20 Vijay Hazare Trophy. He made his Twenty20 debut on 8 November 2019, for Maharashtra in the 2019–20 Syed Mushtaq Ali Trophy. In February 2022, he was bought by the Chennai Super Kings in the auction for the 2022 Indian Premier League tournament. His best IPL bowling performance was against SRH - 4 wickets while conceding 46 runs in IPL 2022.

He is from Darwha, Maharashtra.
