= Hrithik Shokeen =

Indian cricketer (born 2000)

Personal information
- Full name: Hrithik Rakesh Shokeen
- Born: 14 August 2000 (age 26); Delhi, India
- Batting: Right-handed
- Bowling: Right-arm off break
- Role: Bowler

Domestic team information
- Years: Team
- 2022–2023: Mumbai Indians
- 2022–present: Delhi

Career statistics
Competition	FC	LA	T20
Matches	13	15	18
Runs scored	445	77	70
Batting average	27.81	11.00	23.33
100s/50s	0/2	0/0	0/0
Top score	68*	28	25
Balls bowled	2,313	735	271
Wickets	36	20	12
Bowling average	36.44	30.20	32.16
5 wickets in innings	0	0	0
10 wickets in match	0	0	0
Best bowling	4/46	3/26	2/5
Catches/stumpings	4/–	7/–	5/–
- Source: ESPNcricinfo, 1 April 2025

Hrithik Shokeen (born 14 August 2000) is an Indian cricketer who plays for Delhi in domestic cricket and has played for the Mumbai Indians in the Indian Premier League.

He completed his schooling from Modern School (New Delhi). In November 2019, he was named in India U23's squad for the 2019 ACC Emerging Teams Asia Cup in Bangladesh. He made his List A debut for India U23, against Nepal, in the Emerging Teams Cup on 14 November 2019. In February 2022, he was bought by the Mumbai Indians in the auction for the 2022 Indian Premier League (IPL) tournament. He made his Twenty20 debut on 21 April 2022, for the Mumbai Indians in the 2022 IPL.
