= Vishnu Vinod =

Indian cricketer

Personal information
- Born: 2 December 1993 (age 32); Pathanamthitta, Kerala, India
- Batting: Right-handed
- Bowling: Right-arm medium-fast
- Role: Wicket-keeper-batter

Domestic team information
- Years: Team
- 2014—present: Kerala (squad no. 4)
- 2017: Royal Challengers Bangalore (squad no. 4)
- 2022: Sunrisers Hyderabad (squad no. 4)
- 2023: Mumbai Indians (squad no. 4)
- 2025—present: Punjab Kings

Career statistics
Competition	FC	LA	T20
Matches	29	58	72
Runs scored	1,060	1,998	1,757
Batting average	24.65	41.62	32.53
100s/50s	2/2	7/4	1/9
Top score	193*	139	109*
Catches/stumpings	50/4	40/2	30/7
- Source: Cricinfo, 3 January 2026

Vishnu Vinod (born 2 December 1993) is an Indian cricketer who plays for Kerala in domestic cricket and for Punjab Kings in the Indian Premier League. He is a right-handed wicket-keeper-batter and occasional medium pacer.

== Early life ==
Vishnu was born on 2 December 1993 in Pathanamthitta, Kerala. He did his schooling in MGM Higher Secondary School, Thiruvalla and High School Ranni, Perunad. He completed his graduation in BA Political Science from Mar Thoma College, Tiruvalla.

== Domestic career ==
He made his Twenty20 debut against Karnataka in 2014-15 Syed Mushtaq Ali Trophy season for Kerala on 3 April 2014. He made his List A debut against Hyderabad in 2014-15 Vijay Hazare Trophy season Kerala on 10 November 2014. He made his first-class debut for Kerala in the 2016–17 Ranji Trophy on 5 November 2016.

In the 2018-19 Ranji Trophy, he hit his maiden first-class century against Madhya Pradesh scoring an unbeaten 193 off 282 balls.

He was the top run scorer of Kerala on 2019-20 Vijay Hazare Trophy scoring 508 runs from 8 matches with an average of 63.50 including 3 centuries.

In October 2019, he was named in India A's squad for the 2019–20 Deodhar Trophy. He played both the matches ending up with a forgettable tournament with a total of 23 runs from 2 matches with an average of 11.50.

In November 2021, he scored a 26-ball 65* including seven sixes against Tamil Nadu in the quarter-finals of the 2021-22 Syed Mushtaq Ali Trophy. Although, the match ended in a losing cause.

In December 2021, Vishnu scored an unbeaten 100, also forming a record-breaking seventh-wicket of 174 runs along with Sijomon Joseph, winning the match for Kerala in a match against Maharashtra in the 2021-22 Vijay Hazare Trophy.

== Indian Premier League ==
In April 2017, Vishnu was signed to play for Royal Challengers Bangalore in 2017 Indian Premier League as a replacement to wicket-keeper-batter KL Rahul who was ruled out of the tournament. He played 3 matches in the season scoring a total of 19 runs and wasn't retained by the team in the next season.

He went unsold in 2018, 2019 and 2020 seasons of Indian Premier League.

In February 2021, Vinod was bought by the Delhi Capitals in the IPL auction ahead of the 2021 Indian Premier League but was benched the whole season. He was released by Delhi ahead of the 2022 Indian Premier League auction. In February 2022, he was bought by the Sunrisers Hyderabad in the auction for the 2022 Indian Premier League tournament. He was bought by Mumbai Indians at his base price of 20 lakh in 2023 Indian Premier League auction and part of their setup for 2023 and 2024 seasons as a back-up wicket keeper. Eventually he let go by Mumbai Indians ahead of 2025 IPL Mega auction.

== Playing style ==
Vishnu mainly plays as opening batsman but can play as a finisher in lower middle order as well. Apart from being a wicket-keeper, he is also considered by some a good outfielder and useful medium-pacer. He is also known for his six-hitting ability in domestic arena.
