= 2013 Sunrisers Hyderabad season =

Indian Premier League cricket team season

Sunrisers Hyderabad
2013 season
- Coach: Tom Moody
- Captain: Kumar Sangakkara (IPL); Cameron White (IPL); Shikhar Dhawan (CLT20)
- Ground(s): Rajiv Gandhi International Cricket Stadium, Hyderabad (Capacity: 55,000)
- IPL: Playoffs (4th)
- CLT20: Group Stage
- Most runs: Shikhar Dhawan (311)
- Most wickets: Amit Mishra (21)
- Most catches: Cameron White (10)
- Most wicket-keeping dismissals: Parthiv Patel (8)

Sunrisers Hyderabad (SRH) are a franchise cricket team based in Hyderabad, India, who play in the Indian Premier League (IPL). Sunrisers Hyderabad made their IPL debut replacing Deccan Chargers in 2013 Indian Premier League. Kumar Sangakkara was initially appointed as the captain of the Sunrisers Hyderabad but was replaced by Cameron White after nine matches as the latter captained the team for the remaining 7 matches and the Eliminator match in the Playoffs. The team was coached by Tom Moody with Waqar Younis as their bowling coach while V. V. S. Laxman and Kris Srikkanth were appointed as the mentors. The team played all their home games at home in Hyderabad.

In their inaugural season, Sunrisers started their campaign against Pune Warriors India on 5 April 2013 at Hyderabad on a winning note and the team reached the playoffs but were eliminated after losing the eliminator match against Rajasthan Royals by 4 wickets at Feroz Shah Kotla in Delhi on 22 May 2013. They got selected for 2013 Champions League Twenty20 but got knocked out in the group stages.

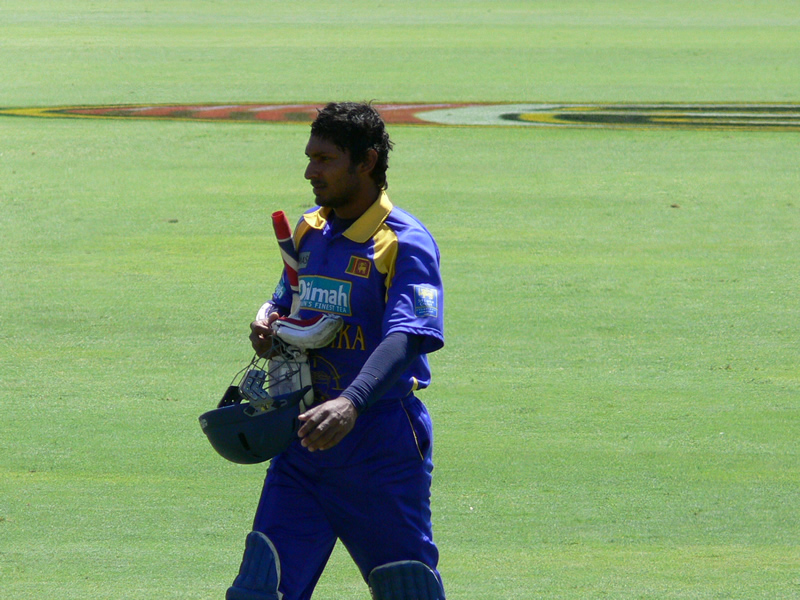
Kumar Sangakkara

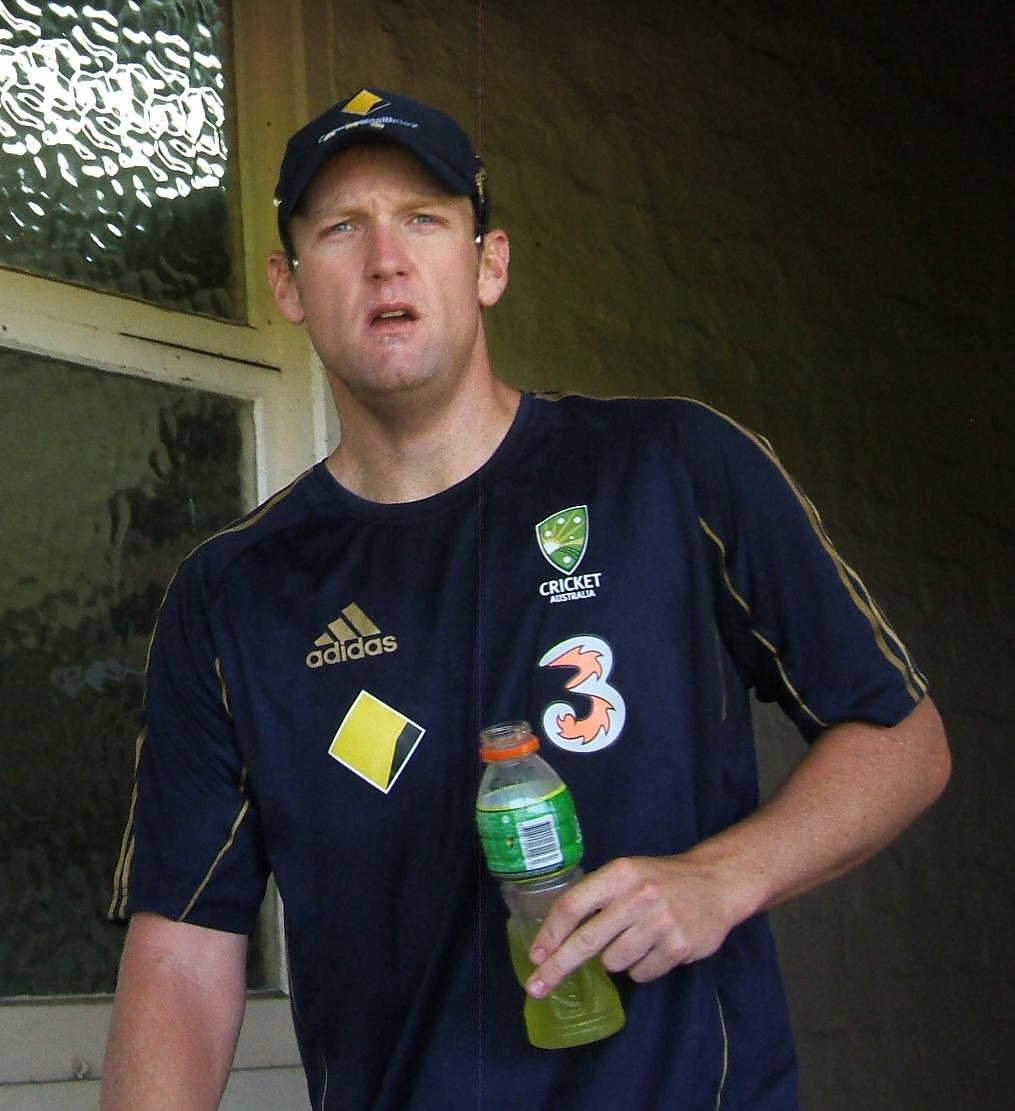
Cameron White

== Background ==
The Sun TV Network won the bid for a new franchise based in Hyderabad with ₹850.5 million (US$8.8 million) per year for a five-year deal, a week after the Deccan Chargers were terminated due to prolonged financial issues. The team was named as the Sunrisers Hyderabad which replaced the Chargers and debuted in the 2013 season. The team logo was unveiled on 20 December 2012, along with the announcement that the team's management would be led by Kris Srikkanth, Tom Moody and V. V. S. Laxman. Waqar Younis and Simon Helmot later joined the coaching staff as bowling coach and assistant coach respectively. The team jersey was unveiled on 8 March 2013, and the team anthem composed by G. V. Prakash Kumar was released on 12 March 2013.

== Players acquisition ==
The players auction for the 2013 Indian Premier League held on 3 February 2013 at Chennai. All nine franchises had participated in the auction. SRH has retained 20 players from Deccan Chargers and released 13 players in November 2012. This leaves Sunrisers with Salary cap remaining of $7mn and have 14 Indian and 6 Overseas players. Sunrisers later added 11 players to the team including 6 capped players during IPL-2013 auction.

They opened their account at 2013 auction by buying South-African wicket-keeper Quinton de Kock at base price of $20,000. They also got two overseas bowling options in the form of right-arm Australian fast-bowler Clint McKay and right-arm off-spinner Nathan McCullum, both at their base price of $100,000. Their most expensive buy in their maiden IPL auction came in with the purchase of Sri-Lankan all-rounder Thisara Perera at a whooping price of $675,000. They also bagged West-Indian all-rounder Darren Sammy for $425,000 to improve their options for the squad. Towards the end, they picked up Sudeep Tyagi, their only Indian purchase at the base price of $100,000.

Post auction, Sunrisers signed Hanuma Vihari, Hyderabad local boy and member of the India Under-19 cricket team that won the 2012 ICC Under-19 Cricket World Cup in Australia. They bought leg-spinner Karn Sharma, all-rounders Padmanabhan Prasanth and Sachin Rana and batsman Thalaivan Sargunam to improve their squad depth. The Sunrisers announced their final squad of 27 players before the tournament releasing the others.

Retained Players: Akshath Reddy, Amit Mishra, Anand Rajan, Ankit Sharma, Ashish Reddy, Biplab Samantray, Dwaraka Ravi Teja, Ishant Sharma, Parthiv Patel, Shikhar Dhawan, Veer Pratap Singh, Cameron White, Chris Lynn, Dale Steyn, Kumar Sangakkara, JP Duminy

Released Players: Abhishek Jhunjhunwala, Akash Bhandari, Arjun Yadav, Bharat Chipli, Darren Bravo, Daniel Christian, Daniel Harris, Ishank Jaggi, Kedar Devdhar, Manpreet Gony, Rusty Theron, Sneha Kishore, Sunny Sohal, Syed Quadri, Tanmay Mishra, Tanmay Srivastava, TP Sudhindra, Tekkami Atchuta Rao

Added Players: Darren Sammy, Hanuma Vihari, Karn Sharma, Nathan McCullum, Padmanabhan Prasanth, Quinton de Kock, Sachin Rana, Sudeep Tyagi, Thalaivan Sargunam, Thisara Perera, Clint McKay

== Squad ==
- Players with international caps are listed in **bold**.
- **Signed Year** denotes year from which player is associated with Sunrisers Hyderabad

Name	Nationality	Birth date	Batting style	Bowling style	Year signed	Notes
Batsmen
**Shikhar Dhawan**	India	15 December 1985 (aged 27)	Left-handed	Right-arm off break	2013	
**JP Duminy**	South Africa	14 April 1984 (aged 28)	Left-handed	Right-arm off break	2013	Overseas. Withdrew due to Injury.
**Chris Lynn**	Australia	10 April 1990 (aged 22)	Right-handed	Slow left arm orthodox	2013	Overseas.
Akshath Reddy	India	11 February 1991 (aged 22)	Right-handed	Right-arm leg break	2013	
Dwaraka Ravi Teja	India	5 September 1987 (aged 25)	Right-handed	Right-arm leg break	2013	
Hanuma Vihari	India	13 October 1993 (aged 19)	Right-handed	Right-arm off break	2013	
**Cameron White**	Australia	18 August 1983 (aged 29)	Right-handed	Right-arm leg break	2013	Vice-captain, Overseas.
All-rounders
**Thisara Perera**	Sri Lanka	3 April 1989 (aged 24)	Left-handed	Right-arm medium	2013	Overseas.
Padmanabhan Prasanth	India	22 May 1985 (aged 27)	Left-handed	Slow left arm orthodox	2013	
Ashish Reddy	India	24 February 1991 (aged 22)	Right-handed	Right-arm medium	2013	
Biplab Samantray	India	14 December 1988 (aged 24)	Right-handed	Right-arm medium	2013	
**Darren Sammy**	West Indies	20 December 1983 (aged 29)	Right-handed	Right-arm medium	2013	Overseas.
Wicket-keepers
**Quinton de Kock**	South Africa	17 December 1992 (aged 20)	Left-handed	–	2013	Overseas
**Parthiv Patel**	India	9 March 1985 (aged 28)	Left-handed	Right-arm off break	2013	
**Kumar Sangakkara**	Sri Lanka	27 October 1977 (aged 35)	Left-handed	Right-arm off break	2013	Captain, Overseas.
Bowlers
**Nathan McCullum**	New Zealand	1 September 1980 (aged 32)	Right-handed	Right-arm off break	2013	Overseas.
**Clint McKay**	Australia	20 February 1983 (aged 30)	Right-handed	Right-arm medium-fast	2013	Overseas.
**Amit Mishra**	India	24 November 1982 (aged 30)	Right-handed	Right-arm leg break	2013	
Anand Rajan	India	17 April 1987 (aged 25)	Right-handed	Right-arm medium-fast	2013	
Sachin Rana	India	18 September 1984 (aged 28)	Right-handed	medium-fast	2013	
Thalaivan Sargunam	India	15 May 1985 (aged 27)	Right-handed	Right-arm off break	2013	
Ankit Sharma	India	20 April 1991 (aged 21)	Left-handed	Slow left arm orthodox	2013	
**Ishant Sharma**	India	2 September 1988 (aged 24)	Right-handed	Right-arm fast-medium	2013	
Karn Sharma	India	23 October 1987 (aged 25)	Left-handed	Right-arm leg break	2013	
Veer Pratap Singh	India	3 May 1992 (aged 20)	Right-handed	medium-fast	2013	
**Dale Steyn**	South Africa	27 June 1983 (aged 29)	Right-handed	Right arm fast	2013	Overseas.
Sudeep Tyagi	India	17 September 1987 (aged 25)	Right-handed	medium-fast	2013	

== Administration and support staff ==
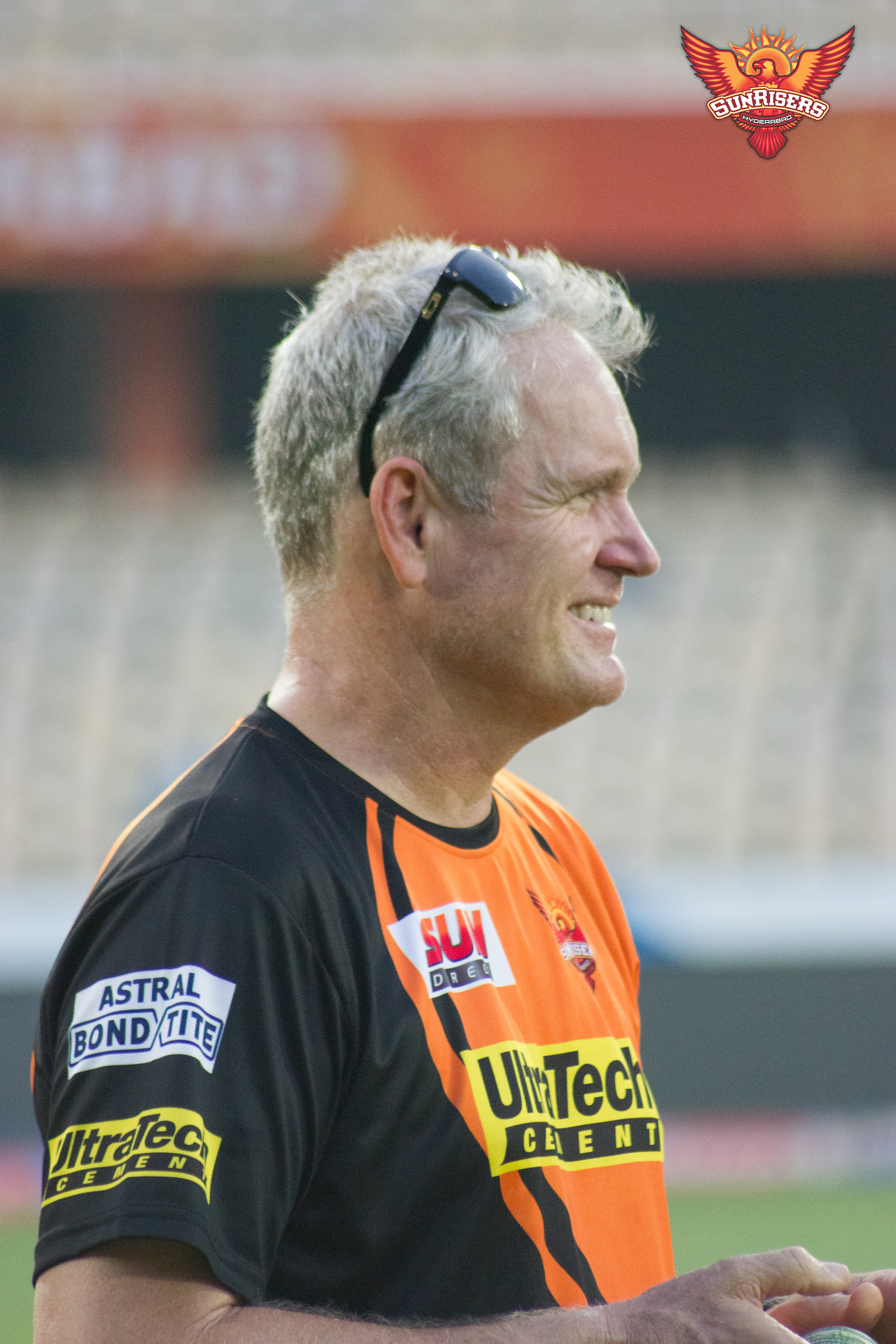
Tom Moody

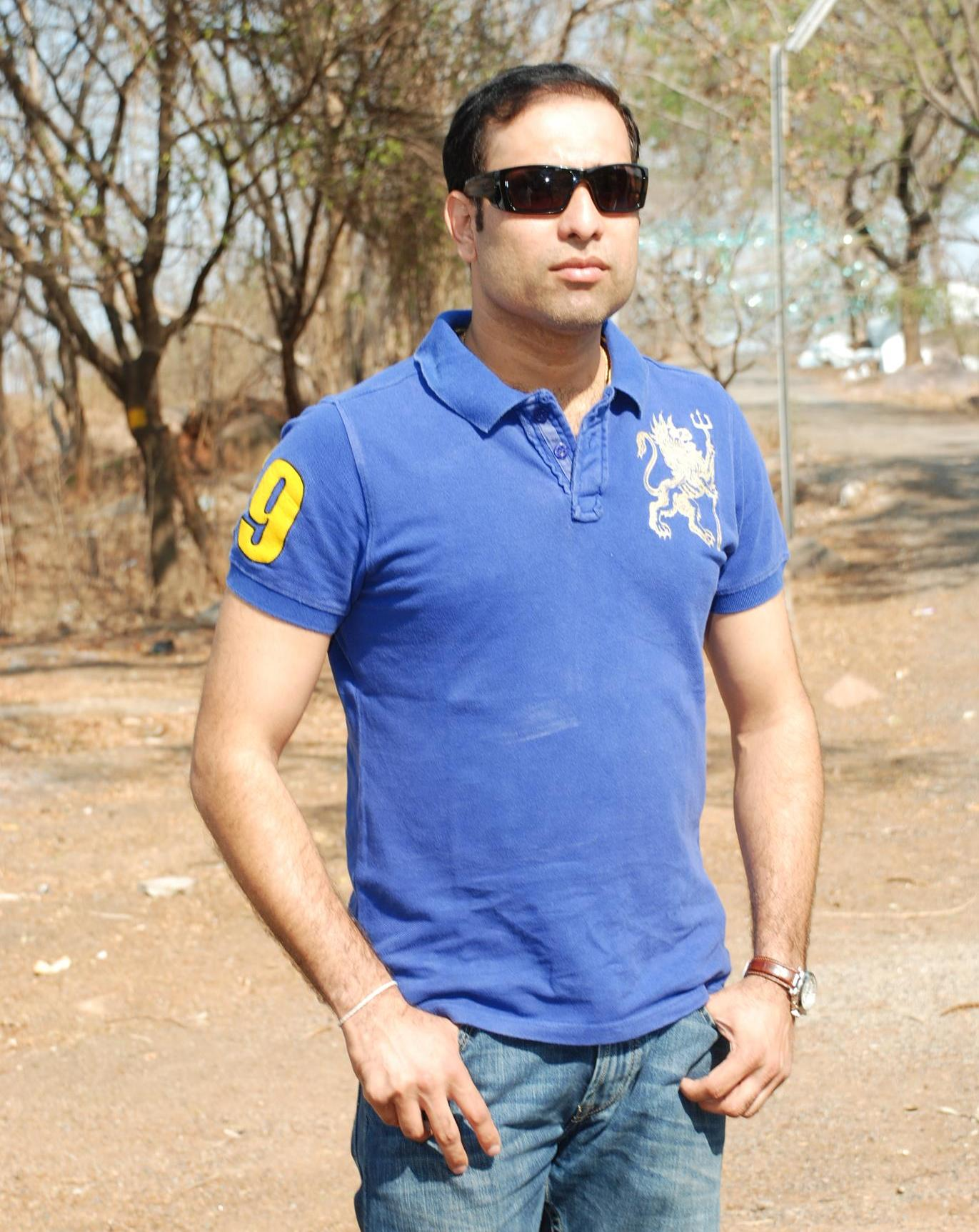
VVS Laxman

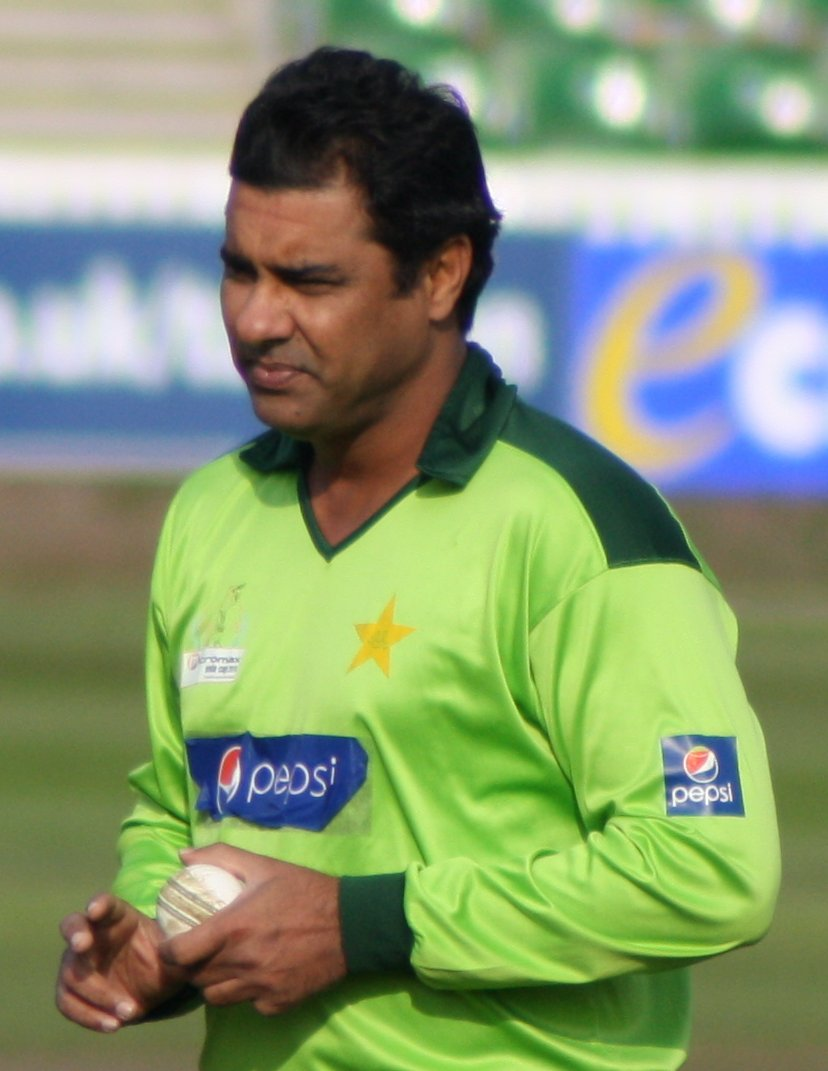
Waqar Younis

Position	Name
Owner	Kalanithi Maran (Sun Network)
Head coach	Tom Moody
Assistant coach	Simon Helmot
Bowling coach	Waqar Younis
Mentor	VVS Laxman
Mentor	Kris Srikkanth
Source :

== Kit manufacturers and sponsors ==
Kit Manufacturers	Shirt Sponsor (Chest)	Shirt Sponsor (Back)	Chest Branding
Puma	makemytrip	SpiceJet	LIVE(IN) Jeans
Source :

== Season overview ==
=== Indian Premier League ===
Group Stage

The Sunrisers Hyderabad started their campaign at home on a winning note defeating the Pune Warriors by 22 runs in a low-scoring match. Amit Mishra was adjudged man of the match for his contribution of 3/19 in four overs. The Sunrisers also won their second match at home, another low-scoring thriller, against the Royal Challengers Bangalore in the Super Over by five runs after both teams tied on total-score of 130 in 20 overs. Hanuma Vihari was awarded man of the match for his unbeaten match winning knock of 44 in 46 balls. The Sunrisers suffered their first defeat against the same opponent in a high-scoring away match when they faced each other two days later. Cameron White scored the first half-century for the Sunrisers to help the team post a challenging total of 161 in 20 overs but Royal Challengers' captain, Virat Kohli's unbeaten knock of 93 in 47 balls completed the chase for the Royal Challengers. Later, the Sunrisers won their first away match against the Delhi Daredevils by three wickets with Mishra contributing again in the Sunrisers' win with 1/15 in four overs and an unbeaten 16 off 14 balls. The Sunrisers lost to the Kolkata Knight Riders in an away tie by 48 runs where Gautam Gambhir's side outscoring the Sunrisers with skipper himself winning man of the match for his knock of 53 in 45 balls. The Sunrisers successfully defended their low-total of 119 against the Warriors in an away tie with Mishra winning his third man of the award for his all-round performance of scoring 30 runs and taking 4/19 in four overs. He also created a record of being the first player to take hat-trick for the Sunrisers and also the first player to take three hat-tricks in the Indian Premier League. This win also helped the Sunrisers achieve their first double this season by winning their both encounters against the Warriors. The Sunrisers extended their winning streak in home games to three with another win against the Kings XI Punjab. Vihari helped the Sunrisers chase the total of 124 in just 18.5 overs with five wickets to spare for which he was awarded the man of the match. The Sunrisers lost their next match to the Chennai Super Kings by five wickets as the match-winning knock of an unbeaten 67 off 37 balls by their captain MS Dhoni won him the man of the match award.

The Sunrisers were completely outplayed by the Rajasthan Royals in an away match with Royals successfully completing the chase of 145 in just 17 overs with eight wickets in hand with Shane Watson winning the man of the match award for his unbeaten knock of 98 in 53 balls. Returning to their home, the Sunrisers extended their winning streak at home to five with the wins against the Mumbai Indians and the Daredevils. Ishant Sharma's bowling effort of 2/15 in four overs and Shikhar Dhawan's unbeaten knock of 73 helped the Sunrisers beat the Mumbai Indians by seven wickets with Sharma winning the man of the match while a collective bowling effort by Sunrisers' bowlers helped them bowl-out the Daredevils for just 80 runs in 19.1 overs as the Sunrisers successfully completed their chase in just 13.5 overs with six wickets in hand. Darren Sammy's all-round performance of 2/10 in three overs and unbeaten knock of 18 in 20 balls got his first man of the match award for the Sunrisers in the match against the Daredevils as this win also helped the Sunrisers knock the Daredevils out of the tournament and complete the double over them, their second double in this season. But, their winning streak at home were halted by the Super Kings with an unbeaten match-winning knock of 99 in 52 balls by Suresh Raina helped the Super Kings beat the Sunrisers by 77 runs which also won him the man of the match award. This loss resulted in the Super Kings complete their double over Sunrisers in this season. The Sunrisers bounced back strongly winning against the Kings XI Punjab and completing the double over them, their third this season. Parthiv Patel's score of 61 in 47 runs helped the Sunrisers post total of 150/7 in 20 overs while Sammy's bowling contribution of 4/22 in four overs completed the win for the Sunrisers by 30 runs. Patel won the man of the match award. The Sunrisers later lost to the Mumbai Indians by seven wickets as an unbeaten knock of 66 in 27 balls by Kieron Pollard earned him the man of the match. With two wins needed in next two matches to qualify for the playoffs, the Sunrisers made most of their home advantage to beat the Royals. The Sunrisers set target of 137 with Biplab Samantray scoring 55 in 46 balls and later they restricted the Royals to just 113 to win the match by 23 runs with Mishra winning the man of the match award for his contribution of 2/8 in four overs. The Sunrisers defeated the Knight Riders in their last home match of the season by five wickets with Patel scoring 47 in 37 balls which also won him the man of the match award. This win helped Sunrisers finish fourth in the league table and qualify for playoffs in their maiden season in the IPL.

Playoff Stage

The Sunrisers were knocked out of the tournament in the eliminator against the Royals in Delhi. The Sunrisers won the toss and posted modest score of 132/7 in 20 overs with Dhawan scoring 33 in 39 balls. The Royals successfully chased the target with four wickets in hand and four balls to spare as Brad Hodge won the man of the match for his unbeaten knock of 54 in 29 balls.

== Competitions ==
=== Indian Premier League ===
==== Summary ====
===== Group stage =====
Pos	Team	Pld	W	L	NR	Pts	NRR
1	Chennai Super Kings (R)	16	11	5	0	22	0.530
2	Mumbai Indians (C)	16	11	5	0	22	0.441
3	Rajasthan Royals (3rd)	16	10	6	0	20	0.322
4	Sunrisers Hyderabad (4th)	16	10	6	0	20	0.003
5	Royal Challengers Bangalore	16	9	7	0	18	0.457
6	Kings XI Punjab	16	8	8	0	16	0.226
7	Kolkata Knight Riders	16	6	10	0	12	−0.095
8	Pune Warriors India	16	4	12	0	8	−1.006
9	Delhi Daredevils	16	3	13	0	6	−0.848

"C" refers to the champions of the tournament, R to the runners-up.

Results by match

Round	1	2	3	4	5	6	7	8	9	10	11	12	13	14	15	16
Ground	H	H	A	A	A	A	H	A	A	H	H	H	A	A	H	H
Result	W	W	L	W	L	W	W	L	L	W	W	L	W	L	W	W

Source: Fixtures
A = Away; H = Home; W = Win; D = Draw; L = Loss

===== Knockout stage =====
Brackets

Semifinals
21 May — Feroz Shah Kotla, Delhi
1	Chennai Super Kings	192/1 (20 ov)
2	Mumbai Indians	144 (18.4 ov)
22 May — Feroz Shah Kotla, Delhi
3	Rajasthan Royals	135/6 (19.2 ov)
4	Sunrisers Hyderabad	132/7 (20 ov)

Preliminary final
24 May — Eden Gardens, Kolkata
2	Mumbai Indians	169/6 (19.5 ov)
3	Rajasthan Royals	165/6 (20 ov)

Final
26 May — Eden Gardens, Kolkata
1	Chennai Super Kings	125/9 (20 ov)
2	Mumbai Indians	148/9 (20 ov)

==== Fixtures ====
===== Group stage =====
5 April	(H) Sunrisers Hyderabad; 126/6 (20 overs)	v	Pune Warriors India; 104 (18.5 overs)	Sunrisers Hyderabad won by 22 runs
20:00 (D/N) Round 1 Scorecard	(H) Sunrisers Hyderabad; 126/6 (20 overs)	v	Pune Warriors India; 104 (18.5 overs)	Rajiv Gandhi International Cricket Stadium, Hyderabad; Umpires: S. Ravi (Ind) and Simon Taufel (Aus); Player of the match: Amit Mishra (SRH)
20:00 (D/N) Round 1 Scorecard	Thisara Perera 30 (18); Ashok Dinda 2/29 (4 overs)		Robin Uthappa 24 (22); Dale Steyn 3/11 (3.5 overs)	Rajiv Gandhi International Cricket Stadium, Hyderabad; Umpires: S. Ravi (Ind) and Simon Taufel (Aus); Player of the match: Amit Mishra (SRH)
Pune Warriors India won the toss and elected to field.; This was the Sunrisers debut match in the IPL.				Rajiv Gandhi International Cricket Stadium, Hyderabad; Umpires: S. Ravi (Ind) and Simon Taufel (Aus); Player of the match: Amit Mishra (SRH)

7 April	Royal Challengers Bangalore; 130/8 (20 overs)	v	Sunrisers Hyderabad (H); 130/7 (20 overs)	Scores level; Sunrisers Hyderabad won the Super Over by 5 runs
20:00 (D/N) Round 2 Scorecard	Royal Challengers Bangalore; 130/8 (20 overs)	v	Sunrisers Hyderabad (H); 130/7 (20 overs)	Rajiv Gandhi International Cricket Stadium, Hyderabad; Umpires: Anil Chaudhary (Ind) and S. Ravi (Ind); Player of the match: Hanuma Vihari (SRH)
20:00 (D/N) Round 2 Scorecard	Virat Kohli 46 (44); Ishant Sharma 3/27 (4 overs)		Hanuma Vihari 44* (46); Moisés Henriques 2/14 (3 overs)	Rajiv Gandhi International Cricket Stadium, Hyderabad; Umpires: Anil Chaudhary (Ind) and S. Ravi (Ind); Player of the match: Hanuma Vihari (SRH)
Royal Challengers Bangalore won the toss and elected to bat.				Rajiv Gandhi International Cricket Stadium, Hyderabad; Umpires: Anil Chaudhary (Ind) and S. Ravi (Ind); Player of the match: Hanuma Vihari (SRH)

9 April	Sunrisers Hyderabad; 161/6 (20 overs)	v	Royal Challengers Bangalore (H); 162/3 (17.4 overs)	Royal Challengers Bangalore won by 7 wickets
16:00 (D/N) Round 3 Scorecard	Sunrisers Hyderabad; 161/6 (20 overs)	v	Royal Challengers Bangalore (H); 162/3 (17.4 overs)	M. Chinnaswamy Stadium, Bangalore; Umpires: S. Ravi (Ind) and Simon Taufel (Aus); Player of the match: Virat Kohli (RCB)
16:00 (D/N) Round 3 Scorecard	Cameron White 52 (34); R. P. Singh 3/27 (4 overs)		Virat Kohli 93* (47); Cameron White 1/14 (1 over)	M. Chinnaswamy Stadium, Bangalore; Umpires: S. Ravi (Ind) and Simon Taufel (Aus); Player of the match: Virat Kohli (RCB)
Sunrisers Hyderabad won the toss and elected to bat.				M. Chinnaswamy Stadium, Bangalore; Umpires: S. Ravi (Ind) and Simon Taufel (Aus); Player of the match: Virat Kohli (RCB)

12 April	(H) Delhi Daredevils; 114/8 (20 overs)	v	Sunrisers Hyderabad; 115/7 (19.2 overs)	Sunrisers Hyderabad won by 3 wickets
20:00 (D/N) Round 4 Scorecard	(H) Delhi Daredevils; 114/8 (20 overs)	v	Sunrisers Hyderabad; 115/7 (19.2 overs)	Feroz Shah Kotla, Delhi; Umpires: Aleem Dar (Pak) and Subroto Das (Ind); Player of the match: Amit Mishra (SRH)
20:00 (D/N) Round 4 Scorecard	Kedar Jadhav 30 (20); Dale Steyn 2/11 (4 overs)		Kumar Sangakkara 28 (28); Shahbaz Nadeem 2/17 (4 overs)	Feroz Shah Kotla, Delhi; Umpires: Aleem Dar (Pak) and Subroto Das (Ind); Player of the match: Amit Mishra (SRH)
Delhi Daredevils won the toss and elected to bat.				Feroz Shah Kotla, Delhi; Umpires: Aleem Dar (Pak) and Subroto Das (Ind); Player of the match: Amit Mishra (SRH)

14 April	(H) Kolkata Knight Riders; 180/4 (20 overs)	v	Sunrisers Hyderabad; 132/7 (20 overs)	Kolkata Knight Riders won by 48 runs
16:00 (D/N) Round 5 Scorecard	(H) Kolkata Knight Riders; 180/4 (20 overs)	v	Sunrisers Hyderabad; 132/7 (20 overs)	Eden Gardens, Kolkata; Umpires: Marais Erasmus (SA) and Vineet Kulkarni (Ind); Player of the match: Gautam Gambhir (KKR)
16:00 (D/N) Round 5 Scorecard	Gautam Gambhir 53 (45); Karan Sharma 1/13 (2 overs)		Thisara Perera 36 (25); Jacques Kallis 3/13 (4 overs)	Eden Gardens, Kolkata; Umpires: Marais Erasmus (SA) and Vineet Kulkarni (Ind); Player of the match: Gautam Gambhir (KKR)
Kolkata Knight Riders won the toss and elected to bat.				Eden Gardens, Kolkata; Umpires: Marais Erasmus (SA) and Vineet Kulkarni (Ind); Player of the match: Gautam Gambhir (KKR)

17 April	Sunrisers Hyderabad; 119/8 (20 overs)	v	Pune Warriors India (H); 108 (19 overs)	Sunrisers Hyderabad won by 11 runs
16:00 (D/N) Round 6 Scorecard	Sunrisers Hyderabad; 119/8 (20 overs)	v	Pune Warriors India (H); 108 (19 overs)	Subrata Roy Sahara Stadium, Pune; Umpires: Asad Rauf (Pak) and Anil Chaudhary (Ind); Player of the match: Amit Mishra (SRH)
16:00 (D/N) Round 6 Scorecard	Biplab Samantray 37 (37); Bhuvneshwar Kumar 3/18 (4 overs)		Robin Uthappa 22 (14); Amit Mishra 4/19 (4 overs)	Subrata Roy Sahara Stadium, Pune; Umpires: Asad Rauf (Pak) and Anil Chaudhary (Ind); Player of the match: Amit Mishra (SRH)
Pune Warriors India won the toss and elected to field.; Amit Mishra became the first player to get three hat-tricks in the IPL.				Subrata Roy Sahara Stadium, Pune; Umpires: Asad Rauf (Pak) and Anil Chaudhary (Ind); Player of the match: Amit Mishra (SRH)

19 April	Kings XI Punjab; 123/9 (20 overs)	v	Sunrisers Hyderabad (H); 127/5 (18.5 overs)	Sunrisers Hyderabad won by 5 wickets
20:00 (D/N) Round 7 Scorecard	Kings XI Punjab; 123/9 (20 overs)	v	Sunrisers Hyderabad (H); 127/5 (18.5 overs)	Rajiv Gandhi International Cricket Stadium, Hyderabad; Umpires: Kumar Dharmasena (SL) and CK Nandan (Ind); Player of the match: Hanuma Vihari (SRH)
20:00 (D/N) Round 7 Scorecard	Adam Gilchrist 26 (25); Karan Sharma 2/19 (3 overs)		Hanuma Vihari 46 (39); Manpreet Gony 2/24 (4 overs)	Rajiv Gandhi International Cricket Stadium, Hyderabad; Umpires: Kumar Dharmasena (SL) and CK Nandan (Ind); Player of the match: Hanuma Vihari (SRH)
Kings XI Punjab won the toss and elected to bat.				Rajiv Gandhi International Cricket Stadium, Hyderabad; Umpires: Kumar Dharmasena (SL) and CK Nandan (Ind); Player of the match: Hanuma Vihari (SRH)

25 April	Sunrisers Hyderabad; 159/6 (20 overs)	v	Chennai Super Kings (H); 160/5 (19.4 overs)	Chennai Super Kings won by 5 wickets
20:00 (D/N) Round 8 Scorecard	Sunrisers Hyderabad; 159/6 (20 overs)	v	Chennai Super Kings (H); 160/5 (19.4 overs)	M. A. Chidambaram Stadium, Chepauk, Chennai; Umpires: Aleem Dar (Pak) and Subroto Das (Ind); Player of the match: Mahendra Singh Dhoni (CSK)
20:00 (D/N) Round 8 Scorecard	Shikhar Dhawan 63* (45); Mohit Sharma 2/33 (4 overs)		Mahendra Singh Dhoni 67* (37); Amit Mishra 3/26 (4 overs)	M. A. Chidambaram Stadium, Chepauk, Chennai; Umpires: Aleem Dar (Pak) and Subroto Das (Ind); Player of the match: Mahendra Singh Dhoni (CSK)
Sunrisers Hyderabad won the toss and elected to bat.				M. A. Chidambaram Stadium, Chepauk, Chennai; Umpires: Aleem Dar (Pak) and Subroto Das (Ind); Player of the match: Mahendra Singh Dhoni (CSK)

27 April	Sunrisers Hyderabad; 144/9 (20 overs)	v	Rajasthan Royals (H); 146/2 (17.5 overs)	Rajasthan Royals won by 8 wickets
16:00 (D/N) Round 9 Scorecard	Sunrisers Hyderabad; 144/9 (20 overs)	v	Rajasthan Royals (H); 146/2 (17.5 overs)	Sawai Mansingh Stadium, Jaipur; Umpires: Vineet Kulkarni (Ind) and Krishnaraj Srinath (Ind); Player of the match: James Faulkner (RR)
16:00 (D/N) Round 9 Scorecard	Darren Sammy 60 (41); James Faulkner 5/20 (4 overs)		Shane Watson 98* (53); Dale Steyn 1/15 (4 overs)	Sawai Mansingh Stadium, Jaipur; Umpires: Vineet Kulkarni (Ind) and Krishnaraj Srinath (Ind); Player of the match: James Faulkner (RR)
Sunrisers Hyderabad won the toss and elected to bat.				Sawai Mansingh Stadium, Jaipur; Umpires: Vineet Kulkarni (Ind) and Krishnaraj Srinath (Ind); Player of the match: James Faulkner (RR)

1 May	Mumbai Indians; 129/4 (20 overs)	v	Sunrisers Hyderabad (H); 130/3 (18 overs)	Sunrisers Hyderabad won by 7 wickets
16:00 (D/N) Round 10 Scorecard	Mumbai Indians; 129/4 (20 overs)	v	Sunrisers Hyderabad (H); 130/3 (18 overs)	Rajiv Gandhi International Cricket Stadium, Hyderabad; Umpires: Asad Rauf (Pak) and Sudhir Asnani (Ind); Player of the match: Ishant Sharma (SRH)
16:00 (D/N) Round 10 Scorecard	Dwayne Smith 38 (40); Ishant Sharma 2/15 (4 overs)		Shikhar Dhawan 73* (55); Dhawal Kulkarni 1/13 (2 overs)	Rajiv Gandhi International Cricket Stadium, Hyderabad; Umpires: Asad Rauf (Pak) and Sudhir Asnani (Ind); Player of the match: Ishant Sharma (SRH)
Mumbai Indians won the toss and elected to bat.				Rajiv Gandhi International Cricket Stadium, Hyderabad; Umpires: Asad Rauf (Pak) and Sudhir Asnani (Ind); Player of the match: Ishant Sharma (SRH)

4 May	Delhi Daredevils; 80 (19.1 overs)	v	Sunrisers Hyderabad (H); 81/4 (13.5 overs)	Sunrisers Hyderabad won by 6 wickets
20:00 (D/N) Round 11 Scorecard	Delhi Daredevils; 80 (19.1 overs)	v	Sunrisers Hyderabad (H); 81/4 (13.5 overs)	Rajiv Gandhi International Cricket Stadium, Hyderabad; Umpires: Asad Rauf (Pak) and Sudhir Asnani (Ind); Player of the match: Darren Sammy (SRH)
20:00 (D/N) Round 11 Scorecard	Unmukt Chand 17 (24); Darren Sammy 2/10 (3 overs)		Shikhar Dhawan 22 (16); Johan Botha 2/11 (3 overs)	Rajiv Gandhi International Cricket Stadium, Hyderabad; Umpires: Asad Rauf (Pak) and Sudhir Asnani (Ind); Player of the match: Darren Sammy (SRH)
Delhi Daredevils won the toss and elected to bat.				Rajiv Gandhi International Cricket Stadium, Hyderabad; Umpires: Asad Rauf (Pak) and Sudhir Asnani (Ind); Player of the match: Darren Sammy (SRH)

8 May	Chennai Super Kings; 223/3 (20 overs)	v	Sunrisers Hyderabad (H); 146/8 (20 overs)	Chennai Super Kings won by 77 runs
20:00 (D/N) Round 12 Scorecard	Chennai Super Kings; 223/3 (20 overs)	v	Sunrisers Hyderabad (H); 146/8 (20 overs)	Rajiv Gandhi International Cricket Stadium, Hyderabad; Umpires: Nigel Llong (Eng) and Subroto Das (Ind); Player of the match: Suresh Raina (CSK)
20:00 (D/N) Round 12 Scorecard	Suresh Raina 99* (52); Thisara Perera 3/45 (4 overs)		Parthiv Patel 44 (30); Mohit Sharma 2/28 (4 overs)	Rajiv Gandhi International Cricket Stadium, Hyderabad; Umpires: Nigel Llong (Eng) and Subroto Das (Ind); Player of the match: Suresh Raina (CSK)
Sunrisers Hyderabad won the toss and elected to field.				Rajiv Gandhi International Cricket Stadium, Hyderabad; Umpires: Nigel Llong (Eng) and Subroto Das (Ind); Player of the match: Suresh Raina (CSK)

11 May	Sunrisers Hyderabad; 150/7 (20 overs)	v	Kings XI Punjab (H); 120/9 (20 overs)	Sunrisers Hyderabad won by 30 runs
20:00 (D/N) Round 13 Scorecard	Sunrisers Hyderabad; 150/7 (20 overs)	v	Kings XI Punjab (H); 120/9 (20 overs)	Punjab Cricket Association Stadium, Mohali, Chandigarh; Umpires: Rod Tucker (Aus) and Subroto Das (Ind); Player of the match: Parthiv Patel (SRH)
20:00 (D/N) Round 13 Scorecard	Parthiv Patel 61 (47); Sandeep Sharma 3/21 (4 overs)		Luke Pomersbach 33 (40); Darren Sammy 4/22 (4 overs)	Punjab Cricket Association Stadium, Mohali, Chandigarh; Umpires: Rod Tucker (Aus) and Subroto Das (Ind); Player of the match: Parthiv Patel (SRH)
Kings XI Punjab won the toss and elected to field.				Punjab Cricket Association Stadium, Mohali, Chandigarh; Umpires: Rod Tucker (Aus) and Subroto Das (Ind); Player of the match: Parthiv Patel (SRH)

13 May	Sunrisers Hyderabad; 178/3 (20 overs)	v	Mumbai Indians (H); 184/3 (19.3 overs)	Mumbai Indians won by 7 wickets
20:00 (D/N) Round 14 Scorecard	Sunrisers Hyderabad; 178/3 (20 overs)	v	Mumbai Indians (H); 184/3 (19.3 overs)	Wankhede Stadium, Mumbai; Umpires: Simon Taufel (Aus) and Anil Chaudhary (Ind); Player of the match: Kieron Pollard (MI)
20:00 (D/N) Round 14 Scorecard	Shikhar Dhawan 59 (41); Lasith Malinga 2/26 (4 overs)		Kieron Pollard 66* (27); Karan Sharma 2/22 (3 overs)	Wankhede Stadium, Mumbai; Umpires: Simon Taufel (Aus) and Anil Chaudhary (Ind); Player of the match: Kieron Pollard (MI)
Sunrisers Hyderabad won the toss and elected to bat.				Wankhede Stadium, Mumbai; Umpires: Simon Taufel (Aus) and Anil Chaudhary (Ind); Player of the match: Kieron Pollard (MI)

17 May	(H) Sunrisers Hyderabad; 136/9 (20 overs)	v	Rajasthan Royals; 113/9 (20 overs)	Sunrisers Hyderabad won by 23 runs
20:00 (D/N) Round 15 Scorecard	(H) Sunrisers Hyderabad; 136/9 (20 overs)	v	Rajasthan Royals; 113/9 (20 overs)	Rajiv Gandhi International Cricket Stadium, Hyderabad; Umpires: Asad Rauf (Pak) and Anil Chaudhary (Ind); Player of the match: Amit Mishra (SRH)
20:00 (D/N) Round 15 Scorecard	Biplab Samantray 55 (46); James Faulkner 5/16 (4 overs)		Kevon Cooper 26 (12); Amit Mishra 2/8 (4 overs)	Rajiv Gandhi International Cricket Stadium, Hyderabad; Umpires: Asad Rauf (Pak) and Anil Chaudhary (Ind); Player of the match: Amit Mishra (SRH)
Sunrisers Hyderabad won the toss and elected to bat.; James Faulkner became the first player to take two five-wicket hauls in the IPL.; As a result of this match, Kings XI Punjab were eliminated.				Rajiv Gandhi International Cricket Stadium, Hyderabad; Umpires: Asad Rauf (Pak) and Anil Chaudhary (Ind); Player of the match: Amit Mishra (SRH)

19 May	Kolkata Knight Riders; 130/7 (20 overs)	v	Sunrisers Hyderabad (H); 132/5 (18.5 overs)	Sunrisers Hyderabad won by 5 wickets
20:00 (D/N) Round 16 Scorecard	Kolkata Knight Riders; 130/7 (20 overs)	v	Sunrisers Hyderabad (H); 132/5 (18.5 overs)	Rajiv Gandhi International Cricket Stadium, Hyderabad; Umpires: Asad Rauf (Pak) and Sudhir Asnani (Ind); Player of the match: Parthiv Patel (SRH)
20:00 (D/N) Round 16 Scorecard	Yusuf Pathan 49* (29); Dale Steyn 2/24 (4 overs)		Parthiv Patel 47 (37); Iqbal Abdulla 3/29 (3.5 overs)	Rajiv Gandhi International Cricket Stadium, Hyderabad; Umpires: Asad Rauf (Pak) and Sudhir Asnani (Ind); Player of the match: Parthiv Patel (SRH)
Kolkata Knight Riders won the toss and elected to bat.; As a result of this match, Royal Challengers Bangalore were eliminated and Sunrisers Hyderabad qualified for the playoff stage.				Rajiv Gandhi International Cricket Stadium, Hyderabad; Umpires: Asad Rauf (Pak) and Sudhir Asnani (Ind); Player of the match: Parthiv Patel (SRH)

===== Knockout stage =====
Eliminator

22 May	Sunrisers Hyderabad; 132/7 (20 overs)	v	Rajasthan Royals; 135/6 (19.2 overs)	Rajasthan Royals won by 4 wickets
20:00 (D/N) Eliminator Scorecard	Sunrisers Hyderabad; 132/7 (20 overs)	v	Rajasthan Royals; 135/6 (19.2 overs)	Feroz Shah Kotla, Delhi; Umpires: S. Ravi (Ind) and Rod Tucker (Aus); Player of the match: Brad Hodge (RR)
20:00 (D/N) Eliminator Scorecard	Shikhar Dhawan 33 (39); Vikramjeet Malik 2/14 (3 overs)		Brad Hodge 54* (29); Darren Sammy 2/27 (3.2 overs)	Feroz Shah Kotla, Delhi; Umpires: S. Ravi (Ind) and Rod Tucker (Aus); Player of the match: Brad Hodge (RR)
Sunrisers Hyderabad won the toss and elected to bat.				Feroz Shah Kotla, Delhi; Umpires: S. Ravi (Ind) and Rod Tucker (Aus); Player of the match: Brad Hodge (RR)

=== Champions League Twenty20 ===
==== Summary ====
===== Qualifying stage =====
Standings

Team	Pld	W	L	NR	Pts	NRR
Otago Volts	3	3	0	0	12	+1.225
Sunrisers Hyderabad	3	2	1	0	8	+0.207
Faisalabad Wolves	3	1	2	0	4	–0.525
Kandurata Maroons	3	0	3	0	0	–0.809

- advanced to the group stage

===== Group stage =====
Standings – Group B

Team	Pld	W	L	NR	Pts	NRR
Trinidad and Tobago	4	3	1	0	12	+0.816
Chennai Super Kings	4	3	1	0	12	+0.271
Titans	4	2	2	0	8	+0.228
Sunrisers Hyderabad	4	1	2	1	6	–0.622
Brisbane Heat	4	0	3	1	2	–1.028

- advanced to the knockout stage

==== Fixtures ====
All times are in Indian Standard Time (UTC+05:30)

===== Qualifying stage =====
17 September	Kandurata Maroons; 168/3 (20 overs)	v	Sunrisers Hyderabad; 174/2 (18.3 overs)	Sunrisers Hyderabad won by 8 wickets
20:00 (D/N); Scorecard	Kandurata Maroons; 168/3 (20 overs)	v	Sunrisers Hyderabad; 174/2 (18.3 overs)	Punjab Cricket Association Stadium, Mohali, Chandigarh; Umpires: Richard Illingworth (Eng) and Vineet Kulkarni (Ind); Player of the match: Shikhar Dhawan (Hyderabad)
20:00 (D/N); Scorecard	Kumar Sangakkara 61* (46); Ishant Sharma 2/20 (4 overs)		Shikhar Dhawan 71 (53); Shehan Jayasuriya 1/25 (4 overs)	Punjab Cricket Association Stadium, Mohali, Chandigarh; Umpires: Richard Illingworth (Eng) and Vineet Kulkarni (Ind); Player of the match: Shikhar Dhawan (Hyderabad)
Sunrisers Hyderabad won the toss and elected to field.				Punjab Cricket Association Stadium, Mohali, Chandigarh; Umpires: Richard Illingworth (Eng) and Vineet Kulkarni (Ind); Player of the match: Shikhar Dhawan (Hyderabad)

18 September	Faisalabad Wolves; 127/5 (20 overs)	v	Sunrisers Hyderabad; 131/3 (17.3 overs)	Sunrisers Hyderabad won by 7 wickets
20:00 (D/N); Scorecard	Faisalabad Wolves; 127/5 (20 overs)	v	Sunrisers Hyderabad; 131/3 (17.3 overs)	Punjab Cricket Association Stadium, Mohali, Chandigarh; Umpires: Richard Illingworth (Eng) and Paul Reiffel (Aus); Player of the match: Amit Mishra (Hyderabad)
20:00 (D/N); Scorecard	Misbah-ul-Haq 56* (40); Amit Mishra 1/13 (4 overs)		Shikhar Dhawan 59 (50); Imran Khalid 2/14 (2 overs)	Punjab Cricket Association Stadium, Mohali, Chandigarh; Umpires: Richard Illingworth (Eng) and Paul Reiffel (Aus); Player of the match: Amit Mishra (Hyderabad)
Sunrisers Hyderabad won the toss and elected to field.; As result of this match, Otago Volts advanced to Group A and Sunrisers Hyderabad advanced to Group B.				Punjab Cricket Association Stadium, Mohali, Chandigarh; Umpires: Richard Illingworth (Eng) and Paul Reiffel (Aus); Player of the match: Amit Mishra (Hyderabad)

20 September	Sunrisers Hyderabad; 143/5 (20 overs)	v	Otago Volts; 144/5 (16.2 overs)	Otago Volts won by 5 wickets
20:00 (D/N); Scorecard	Sunrisers Hyderabad; 143/5 (20 overs)	v	Otago Volts; 144/5 (16.2 overs)	Punjab Cricket Association Stadium, Mohali, Chandigarh; Umpires: Vineet Kulkarni (Ind) and Paul Reiffel (Aus); Player of the match: Nathan McCullum (Otago)
20:00 (D/N); Scorecard	JP Duminy 57* (38); Nathan McCullum 2/23 (4 overs)		Brendon McCullum 67* (39); Dale Steyn 2/13 (3 overs)	Punjab Cricket Association Stadium, Mohali, Chandigarh; Umpires: Vineet Kulkarni (Ind) and Paul Reiffel (Aus); Player of the match: Nathan McCullum (Otago)
Otago Volts won the toss and elected to field.				Punjab Cricket Association Stadium, Mohali, Chandigarh; Umpires: Vineet Kulkarni (Ind) and Paul Reiffel (Aus); Player of the match: Nathan McCullum (Otago)

===== Group stage =====
24 September	Trinidad and Tobago; 160/8 (20 overs)	v	Sunrisers Hyderabad; 164/6 (19.3 overs)	Sunrisers Hyderabad won by 4 wickets
20:00 (D/N); Scorecard	Trinidad and Tobago; 160/8 (20 overs)	v	Sunrisers Hyderabad; 164/6 (19.3 overs)	Punjab Cricket Association Stadium, Mohali, Chandigarh; Attendance: 16,299; Umpires: S.Ravi (Ind) and Rod Tucker (Aus); Player of the match: Thisara Perera (Hyderabad)
20:00 (D/N); Scorecard	Darren Bravo 66 (44); Darren Sammy 2/21 (4 overs)		Thisara Perera 57* (32); Sunil Narine 4/9 (4 overs)	Punjab Cricket Association Stadium, Mohali, Chandigarh; Attendance: 16,299; Umpires: S.Ravi (Ind) and Rod Tucker (Aus); Player of the match: Thisara Perera (Hyderabad)
Sunrisers Hyderabad won the toss and elected to field.				Punjab Cricket Association Stadium, Mohali, Chandigarh; Attendance: 16,299; Umpires: S.Ravi (Ind) and Rod Tucker (Aus); Player of the match: Thisara Perera (Hyderabad)

26 September	Chennai Super Kings; 202/4 (20 overs)	v	Sunrisers Hyderabad; 190/7 (20 overs)	Chennai Super Kings won by 12 runs
20:00 (D/N); Scorecard	Chennai Super Kings; 202/4 (20 overs)	v	Sunrisers Hyderabad; 190/7 (20 overs)	JSCA International Stadium Complex, Ranchi; Attendance: 32,783; Umpires: Bruce Oxenford (Aus) and Rod Tucker (Aus); Player of the match: Suresh Raina (Chennai)
20:00 (D/N); Scorecard	Suresh Raina 84 (57); Dale Steyn 2/23 (4 overs)		Darren Sammy 50 (25); Dwayne Bravo 2/34 (4 overs)	JSCA International Stadium Complex, Ranchi; Attendance: 32,783; Umpires: Bruce Oxenford (Aus) and Rod Tucker (Aus); Player of the match: Suresh Raina (Chennai)
Sunrisers Hyderabad won the toss and elected to field.; Mahendra Singh Dhoni made the fastest half century (16 balls) in CLT20.				JSCA International Stadium Complex, Ranchi; Attendance: 32,783; Umpires: Bruce Oxenford (Aus) and Rod Tucker (Aus); Player of the match: Suresh Raina (Chennai)

28 September	Sunrisers Hyderabad; 145/7 (20 overs)	v	Titans; 147/2 (16.3 overs)	Titans won by 8 wickets
16:00 (D/N); Scorecard	Sunrisers Hyderabad; 145/7 (20 overs)	v	Titans; 147/2 (16.3 overs)	JSCA International Stadium Complex, Ranchi; Attendance: 28,347; Umpires: Bruce Oxenford (Aus) and S.Ravi (Ind); Player of the match: Henry Davids (Titans)
16:00 (D/N); Scorecard	Shikhar Dhawan 37 (21); David Wiese 3/17 (4 overs)		Henry Davids 64 (42); Dale Steyn 1/23 (4 overs)	JSCA International Stadium Complex, Ranchi; Attendance: 28,347; Umpires: Bruce Oxenford (Aus) and S.Ravi (Ind); Player of the match: Henry Davids (Titans)
Titans won the toss and elected to field.				JSCA International Stadium Complex, Ranchi; Attendance: 28,347; Umpires: Bruce Oxenford (Aus) and S.Ravi (Ind); Player of the match: Henry Davids (Titans)

30 September	Brisbane Heat	v	Sunrisers Hyderabad	Match abandoned without a ball bowled
20:00 (D/N); Scorecard	Brisbane Heat	v	Sunrisers Hyderabad	Sardar Patel Stadium, Motera, Ahmedabad; Umpires: Bruce Oxenford (Aus) and S.Ravi (Ind)
Match abandoned due to rain.; As a result of this match, Sunrisers Hyderabad were eliminated.				Sardar Patel Stadium, Motera, Ahmedabad; Umpires: Bruce Oxenford (Aus) and S.Ravi (Ind)

== Statistics ==
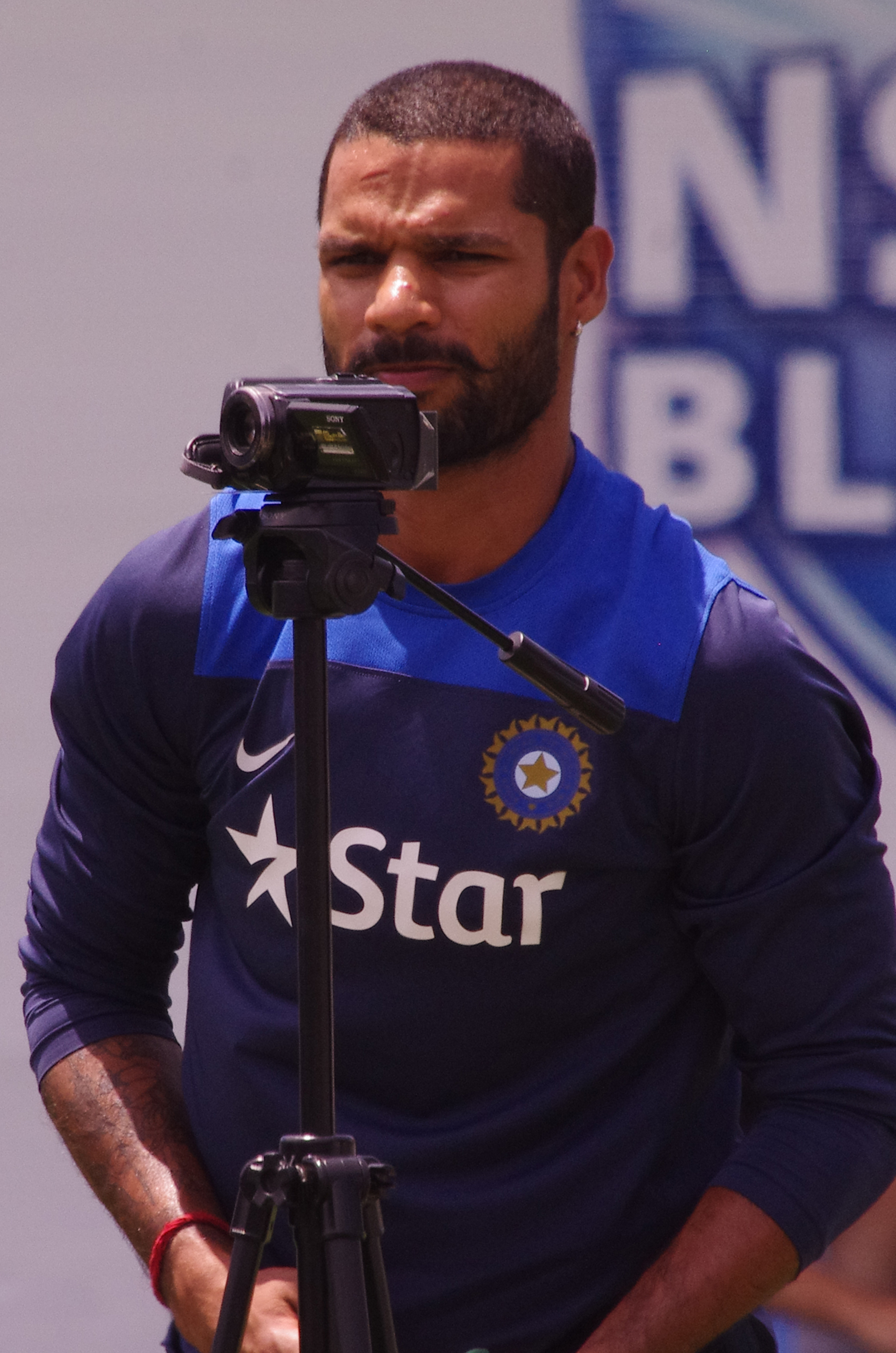
Shikhar Dhawan became highest run-getter for SRH in IPL 2013.

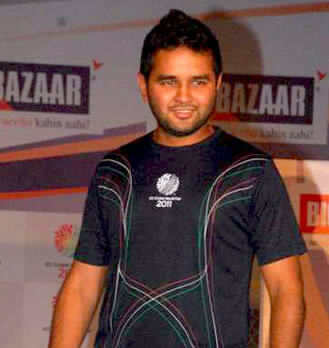
Parthiv Patel became second highest run-getter for SRH in IPL 2013.

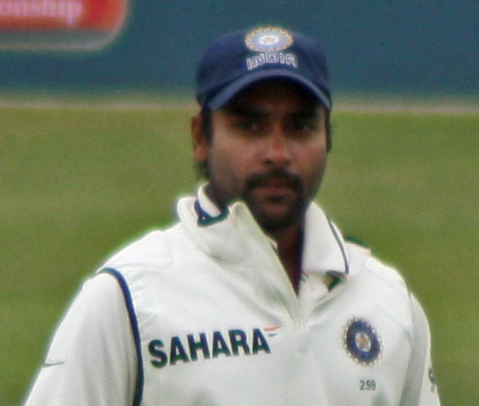
Amit Mishra became highest wicket-taker for SRH in IPL 2013.

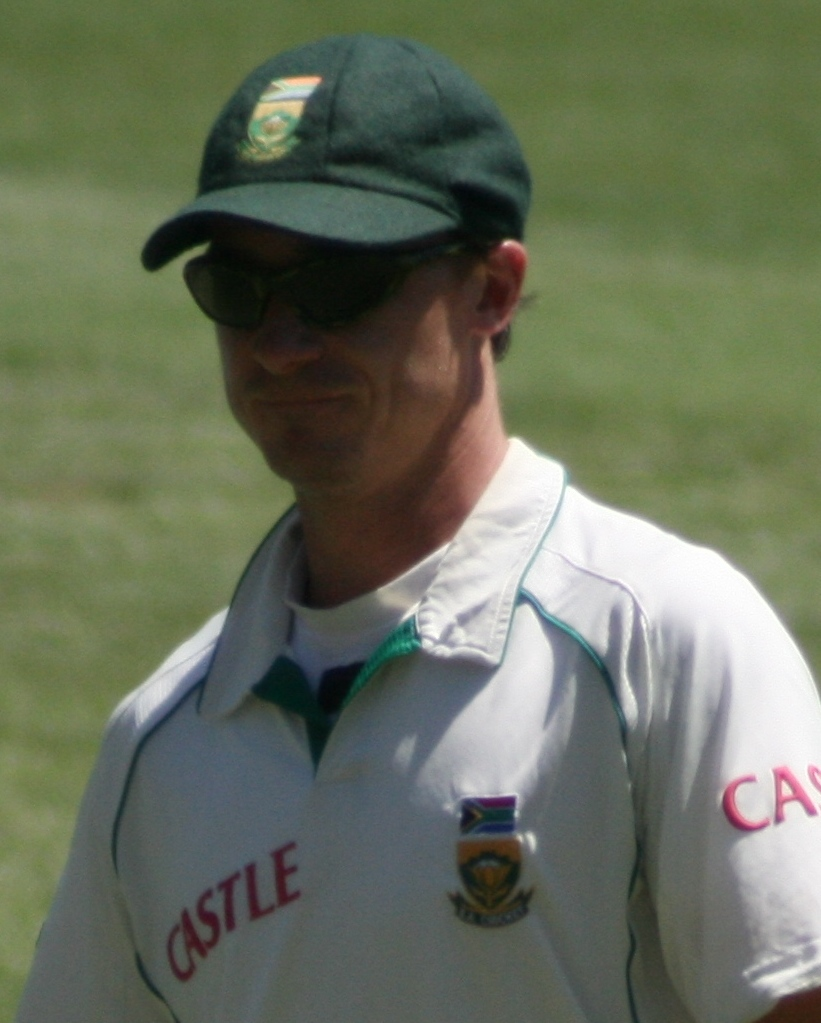
Dale Steyn became second highest wicket-taker for SRH in IPL 2013.

Name	Mat	Runs	HS	Ave	SR	Wkts	BBI	Ave	Eco	Ct	St
Shikhar Dhawan	14	311	73*	38.87	122.92	-	-	-	-	3	0
Kumar Sangakkara	9	120	28	13.33	82.35	-	-	-	-	3	0
Parthiv Patel	13	294	61	22.61	115.29	-	-	-	-	5	3
Cameron White	13	209	52	17.41	109.42	1	1/14	16.00	8.00	10	0
Biplab Samantray	8	123	55	24.60	110.81	-	-	-	-	3	0
Darren Sammy	10	174	60	29.00	131.81	8	4/22	21.00	7.52	3	0
Thisara Perera	16	233	40	23.30	142.94	19	3/20	25.15	8.01	5	0
Hanuma Vihari	17	241	46	17.41	101.85	1	1/5	38.00	6.33	4	0
Ashish Reddy	12	125	36*	20.83	140.44	3	1/7	23.33	10.50	7	0
Akshath Reddy	7	91	27	13.00	90.09	-	-	-	-	2	0
Karn Sharma	13	85	39*	21.25	98.83	11	2/19	20.90	6.60	4	0
Dwaraka Ravi Teja	2	14	10	14.00	82.35	-	-	-	-	0	0
Quinton de Kock	3	6	4*	2.00	40.00	-	-	-	-	3	1
Dale Steyn	17	53	18*	26.50	147.22	19	3/11	20.21	5.66	3	0
Amit Mishra	17	89	30	14.83	92.70	21	4/19	18.76	6.35	2	0
Thalaivan Sargunam	1	10	10	10.00	58.82	-	-	-	-	0	0
Anand Rajan	2	-	-	-	-	2	1/20	21.00	5.25	1	0
Ankit Sharma	1	-	-	-	-	0	-	-	8.50	1	0
Ishant Sharma	16	0	0*	-	-	15	3/27	31.06	7.81	6	0

IPL Statistics Full Table on ESPNcricinfo

Last updated: 26 Oct 2017

== Awards and achievements ==
=== Player of the match awards ===
No.	Date	Player	Opponent	Venue	Result	Contribution	Ref.
2013 Indian Premier League
1	5 April 2013	Amit Mishra	Pune Warriors India	Hyderabad	Won by 22 runs	3/19 (4 overs)	
2	7 April 2013	Hanuma Vihari	Royal Challengers Bangalore	Hyderabad	Won in Super Over	1/5 (1 over) & 44* (46)	
3	12 April 2013	Amit Mishra	Delhi Daredevils	New Delhi	Won by 3 wickets	1/15 (4 overs) & 16* (14)	
4	17 April 2013	Amit Mishra	Pune Warriors India	Pune	Won by 11 runs	30(24) & 4/19 (4 overs)	
5	19 April 2013	Hanuma Vihari	Kings XI Punjab	Hyderabad	Won by 5 wickets	0/2 (1 over) & 46(39)	
6	1 May 2013	Ishant Sharma	Mumbai Indians	Hyderabad	Won By 7 wickets	2/15 (4 overs)	
7	4 May 2013	Darren Sammy	Delhi Daredevils	Hyderabad	Won By 6 wickets	2/10 (3 overs) & 18* (20)	
8	11 May 2013	Parthiv Patel	Kings XI Punjab	Mohali	Won by 30 runs	61(47)	
9	17 May 2013	Amit Mishra	Rajasthan Royals	Hyderabad	Won By 23 runs	2/8 (4 overs)	
10	19 May 2013	Parthiv Patel	Kolkata Knight Riders	Hyderabad	Won By 5 wickets	47(37)	
2013 Champions League Twenty20
Qualifying Stage
1	17 September 2013	Shikhar Dhawan	Kandurata Maroons	Mohali	Won by 8 wickets	71(53)	
2	18 September 2013	Amit Mishra	Faisalabad Wolves	Mohali	Won by 7 wickets	1/13 (4 overs)	
Group Stage
3	24 September 2013	Thisara Perera	Trinidad and Tobago	Mohali	Won by 4 wickets	2/26 (4 overs) & 57* (32)	

=== Achievements ===
2013 Indian Premier League

- Reached Playoff Stage in their debut season
- Amit Mishra took a hat-trick against Pune Warriors
- Most Economic Bowler : Anand Rajan (5.25)
- Most Dot Balls Bowled : Dale Steyn (211)

2013 Champions League

- Qualified to Group Stage from Qualifying Stage

== See also ==
- List of Sunrisers Hyderabad records
