= 2013 Indian Premier League =

Cricket tournament

- Dates: 3 April 2013 – 26 May 2013
- Administrator: Board of Control for Cricket in India
- Cricket format: Twenty20
- Tournament format(s): Double round robin and playoffs
- Champions: Mumbai Indians (1st title)
- Runners-up: Chennai Super Kings
- Participants: 9
- Matches: 76
- Player of the series: Shane Watson (RR)
- Most runs: Michael Hussey (CSK) (733)
- Most wickets: Dwayne Bravo (CSK) (32)
- Official website: www.iplt20.com

The 2013 Indian Premier League season (abbreviated as IPL 6 or Pepsi IPL 2013) was the sixth season of the Indian Premier League, established by the Board of Control for Cricket in India (BCCI) in 2007. The tournament featured nine teams and was held from 3 April to 26 May 2013. The opening ceremony was held at the Salt Lake Stadium in Kolkata on 2 April 2013. This was the first season with PepsiCo as the title sponsor. The Kolkata Knight Riders were the defending champions, having won the 2012 season. A spot fixing case was revealed by Delhi Police, leading to arrest of three cricketers from Rajasthan Royals and other persons. Mumbai Indians won the tournament for the first time, defeating Chennai Super Kings in the final by 23 runs.

== Background ==
=== Sponsorship ===
PepsiCo replaced DLF Ltd as the title sponsor starting with the 2013 season. DLF did not renew their contract after their initial five-year contract, for ₹ 2.50 billion, ended with the previous season. PepsiCo's contract is ₹ 3968 million for five years, ending with the 2017 season. In response to questions about the higher sponsorship costs compared to DLF's, a representative of PepsiCo said, "Our estimate is that we will get five to six times the value of the money we paid." However, Brand Finance had assessed the IPL's brand value to have fallen from $4.1 billion in 2010 to $2.9 billion in 2012, attributed to the decline in television ratings over the two years.

=== Termination of Deccan Chargers ===
Deccan Chargers, champions of the 2009 Indian Premier League, became the second team to be terminated from the IPL after Kochi Tuskers Kerala. The owners failed to save the team after several attempts were made with the Bombay High Court and Supreme Court of India. Immediately after the Chargers' termination, the BCCI invited bidders for a replacement team also based in Hyderabad. It was announced on 25 October 2012 that Sun TV Network won the bid at ₹ 850.5 million per year. The new team was named the Sunrisers Hyderabad.

=== Personnel changes ===
In October 2012, the teams were allowed to release any number of their players from their contracts to reduce their player costs. The released players would have the option of entering the auction. The players' auction was held on 3 February 2013, where 37 players were sold.

=== Overseas participation ===
Availability of Bangladeshi players was put in doubt when the Bangladesh Cricket Board considered not issuing the players with the No Objection Certificates they needed to participate in the tournament. Their deliberation was due to the tournament's dates clashing with the Bangladesh tour of Zimbabwe. Regardless, both affected players, Shakib Al Hasan and Tamim Iqbal, missed the start of the tournament due to injury.

Despite the progress on the restoration of cricketing relations between India and Pakistan after the Pakistan national cricket team toured India in December 2012 and January 2013, no Pakistani players were included in the auction. Several South Africans missed the start of the tournament to play in the knockout stage of the Ram Slam T20 Challenge. Two New Zealand players were released early by their teams to join the New Zealand tour of England. Both players were not performing for their teams. Sri Lanka Cricket made a similar request to allow some of their players to join their preparations for the ICC Champions Trophy.

Shortly before the start of the season, the IPL governing council ruled that Sri Lankan cricketers and match officials will not participate in any matches held in Chennai. This was a result of the growing political tensions in Tamil Nadu concerning the ethnic conflict between the Sinhalese and Sri Lankan Tamils. The anti-Sinhalaese sentiments from the people of Tamil Nadu raised security concerns for Sri Lankan involvement. The decision was made after Jayalalithaa, the chief minister of Tamil Nadu, wrote to the Prime Minister of India requesting the ban.

Other than the Chennai Super Kings, the franchises were not in support of the decision as they believed it offered Chennai an added advantage in their home matches. Chennai's Sri Lankan players hold secondary positions in their team while some Sri Lankans in other teams play key roles and their absence in those matches would affect their team strategies. Another concern was with how the decision did not follow the precedence of moving the matches to a different venue. However, the playoff matches originally scheduled to be held in Chennai were later relocated to Delhi.

== Opening ceremony ==
The opening ceremony was held at the largest stadium in India, and the second largest stadium in the world by capacity, the Salt Lake Stadium or Yuva Bharati Krirangan in Kolkata, on 2 April 2013. All nine teams, led by their captains, took the "MCC Spirit of Cricket" pledge. Mamata Banerjee, the Chief Minister of West Bengal, was present at the ceremony. It featured live performances of American rapper Pitbull and Indian film stars Shah Rukh Khan, Katrina Kaif and Deepika Padukone.

== Season summary ==
=== April ===
The season began on 3 April with the defending champions the Kolkata Knight Riders defeating the Delhi Daredevils; Kolkata and Australian quick Brett Lee notably getting a wicket off the first ball of the tournament, getting Unmukt Chand out. Kolkata would then struggle and lose five of their next six matches due to good batting performances only coming from captain Gautam Gambhir and Eoin Morgan. Delhi, who topped the group stage in 2012, had a six-match losing streak due to batting failures apart from three half-centuries from captain Mahela Jayawardene and David Warner. Both Delhi and Kolkata were positioned at the bottom of the points table for the first half of the season.

Three-time runners-up the Royal Challengers Bangalore won six of their first eight matches with a six-of-six home record. This was credited to good death-over bowling from Vinay Kumar and prolific and quick run-scoring from captain Virat Kohli, Chris Gayle and AB de Villiers. This included Gayle's score of 175 not out, the highest in Twenty20 cricket. However, their performances were fluctuant. Included was a 130-run victory, two Super Overs and two other matches involving a tight finish. Two-time champions the Chennai Super Kings were similarly dominant, with good batting from captain Mahendra Singh Dhoni, Michael Hussey and Suresh Raina and an all-round bowling attack. They came up with an IPL record-equalling seven-match winning streak, which took them to the top of the points table.

The Mumbai Indians, who made playoff-stage appearances in each of the past three years, were inconsistent with both batting and bowling. Good batting performances from Dinesh Karthik, Rohit Sharma and Kieron Pollard put Mumbai at the middle of the points table halfway through the season. The Sunrisers Hyderabad produced results contrary to the poor performance last season by their predecessors the Deccan Chargers. With no stand-out individual batting performances, Hyderabad managed to win five of their first seven matches. Their strength was in their strong and economical bowling from an attack centred around Dale Steyn and Amit Mishra. Mishra got the second hat-trick of the season, becoming the first to achieve three IPL hat-tricks.

Also at the middle of the points table was the Rajasthan Royals. They won matches with cohesive batting and bowling where different players delivered match-winning contributions. Shane Watson produced scores of 101 and 98 not out while James Faulkner was briefly the season's top wicket-taker after taking 5 for 20. The Pune Warriors India and the Kings XI Punjab continue their form from 2012. Pune won two matches from eight with significant contributions coming only from Aaron Finch, Steve Smith and Bhuvneshwar Kumar. Punjab had average performances with poor contributions from their international players and a dependency on their less-accomplished local players.

=== May ===
In the second half of the season, Chennai continued to be dominant and held their number-one position on the points table while Mumbai, Rajasthan, Bangalore and Hyderabad were evenly matched as they switched between the positions of second to fifth. Mumbai excelled to win seven out of eight matches with improved bowling performances around Mitchell Johnson and Pollard producing an unbeaten innings of 66 runs from 27 balls. Rajasthan were also strong and had four consecutive victories and a perfect record at home. Ajinkya Rahane scored three consecutive half-centuries, Sanju Samson made a strong IPL debut and Watson continued his good form.

Bangalore's schedule had them play six consecutive away matches, of which they could only win two due to their bowling attack struggling on away surfaces and repeatedly failures to defend high scores set by Gayle, Kohli and de Villiers. Hyderabad's bowlers continued to perform while their batting was strengthened with the inclusion of Shikhar Dhawan, who returned from injury after scoring the fastest Test-debut hundred two months ago, and Darren Sammy. Bangalore and Hyderabad slowly fell behind Mumbai and Rajasthan in the points table, allowing a chance for other teams.

Delhi and Pune failed to recover from their poor starts to the season and were the first to be eliminated from the tournament, similar to their performances in 2011. Punjab's form deteriorated as they faced teams at the top-half of the points table, with only Shaun Marsh and David Miller making significant batting contributions. Kolkata showed signs of improvement as their bowlers limited the opposition to low scores but this only lifted their position to sixth. Both Punjab and Kolkata needed to win every one of their remaining matches for any chance of qualification.

With ten matches remaining in the group stage, Chennai, Mumbai and Rajasthan were first to earn playoff stage berths while a few losses by Bangalore and Hyderabad gave Kolkata and Punjab a slim chance of competing for the final spot. Kolkata was eliminated after suffering an upset at home by Pune. Punjab, despite finishing their season with three straight wins, failed to catch up. The tie between Bangalore and Hyderabad came down to the final match of the group stage, between Hyderabad and Kolkata. Hyderabad won to place themselves narrowly ahead of Bangalore by one win and qualify.

==== Playoff stage ====
Amidst the spot-fixing controversy and despite Faulkner's second five-wicket haul, Rajasthan finished the group stage with two consecutive losses and gave Mumbai and Chennai the advantageous top two positions. In Qualifier 1 between Chennai and Mumbai, a 140-run partnership between Raina and Hussey against Mumbai's formidable bowling helped Chennai win by 48 runs and qualify for their fifth IPL Final. Dwayne Smith's innings of 68 runs was the only highlight of Mumbai's innings. Rajasthan faced Hyderabad in the Eliminator. On a slow pitch that troubled batsmen, Brad Hodge top-scored with an unbeaten innings of 54 runs to help Rajasthan win in a low-scoring match.

In Qualifier 2, Mumbai defeated Rajasthan by 4 wickets. Mumbai bowled better, as Harbhajan Singh's 3 wickets earned him the man of the match. Smith was again the top-scorer for Mumbai, scoring 68 but better support from other batsmen allowed Mumbai to win with one ball remaining. Mumbai faced Chennai in the Final, in which the Mumbai Indians had a shaky start but due to some great batting by Kieron Pollard (he scored 60*), they managed to reach a score of 148–9. They started well with the ball, reducing Chennai to 39–6, but captain MS Dhoni led from the front. However, he lacked support from the other end. Finally they finished at 125–9, giving the Mumbai Indians an unexpected victory and won their first IPL Title.

== Other incidents ==
=== Spot-fixing ===
On 16 May 2013, Rajasthan Royals players Sreesanth, Ankeet Chavan and Ajit Chandila were arrested from Mumbai's Trident Hotel by Delhi Police along with seven bookies on charges of spot-fixing in the tournament. Police sources said the players have been accused of spot-fixing in their matches on 9 and 15 May 2013 against Kings XI Punjab and Mumbai Indians respectively.

=== Withdrawal by Pune Warriors India ===
On 21 May 2013, Pune Warriors India terminated their participation in the league due to disagreements with their franchisee fees for the BCCI.

== Venues ==
12 venues were selected to host the matches, with Raipur and Ranchi hosting for the first time in the tournament's history. In the playoff stage, Delhi will host the Qualifier 1 and Eliminator while Kolkata will host the Qualifier 2 and Final. Chennai was originally scheduled to host the playoff stage matches instead of Delhi on account of Chennai and Kolkata being the home venues of the runners-up and champions of the 2012 season. The change was made due to the political tension in Tamil Nadu preventing Sri Lankan players and management staff from entering the state.

Jaipur	Dharamsala	Mohali	Delhi
Rajasthan Royals	Kings XI Punjab	Kings XI Punjab	Delhi Daredevils
Sawai Mansingh Stadium	HPCA Stadium	Punjab Cricket Association Stadium	Feroz Shah Kotla
Capacity: 30,000	Capacity: 23,000	Capacity: 30,000	Capacity: 48,000
Mumbai	2013 Indian Premier League is located in India		Kolkata
Mumbai Indians	2013 Indian Premier League is located in India		Kolkata Knight Riders
Wankhede Stadium	2013 Indian Premier League is located in India		Eden Gardens
Capacity: 45,000	2013 Indian Premier League is located in India		Capacity: 67,000
Pune	2013 Indian Premier League is located in India		Ranchi
Pune Warriors India	2013 Indian Premier League is located in India		Kolkata Knight Riders
Maharashtra Cricket Association Stadium	2013 Indian Premier League is located in India		JSCA International Cricket Stadium
Capacity: 55,000	2013 Indian Premier League is located in India		Capacity: 35,000
Bangalore	Chennai	Hyderabad	Raipur
Royal Challengers Bangalore	Chennai Super Kings	Sunrisers Hyderabad	Delhi Daredevils
M. Chinnaswamy Stadium	M. A. Chidambaram Stadium	Rajiv Gandhi International Cricket Stadium	Raipur International Cricket Stadium
Capacity: 40,000	Capacity: 50,000	Capacity: 55,000	Capacity: 65,000

== Teams and standings ==
=== Points table ===
Pos	Team	Pld	W	L	NR	Pts	NRR
1	Chennai Super Kings (R)	16	11	5	0	22	0.530
2	Mumbai Indians (C)	16	11	5	0	22	0.441
3	Rajasthan Royals (3rd)	16	10	6	0	20	0.322
4	Sunrisers Hyderabad (4th)	16	10	6	0	20	0.003
5	Royal Challengers Bangalore	16	9	7	0	18	0.457
6	Kings XI Punjab	16	8	8	0	16	0.226
7	Kolkata Knight Riders	16	6	10	0	12	−0.095
8	Pune Warriors India	16	4	12	0	8	−1.006
9	Delhi Daredevils	16	3	13	0	6	−0.848

"C" refers to the champions of the tournament, R to the runners-up.

== Group stage ==
Visitor team →	CSK	DD	KXIP	KKR	MI	PWI	RR	RCB	SRH
Home team ↓	CSK	DD	KXIP	KKR	MI	PWI	RR	RCB	SRH
Chennai Super Kings		Chennai; 33 runs	Chennai; 15 runs	Chennai; 14 runs	Mumbai; 9 runs	Pune; 24 runs	Chennai; 5 wickets	Chennai; 4 wickets	Chennai; 5 wickets
Delhi Daredevils	Chennai; 86 runs		Punjab; 5 wickets	Delhi; 7 wickets	Delhi; 9 wickets	Delhi; 15 runs	Rajasthan; 5 runs	Bengaluru; 4 runs	Hyderabad; 3 wickets
Kings XI Punjab	Chennai; 10 wickets	Punjab; 7 runs		Punjab; 4 runs	Punjab; 50 runs	Punjab; 7 wickets	Rajasthan; 8 wickets	Punjab; 6 wickets	Hyderabad; 30 runs
Kolkata Knight Riders	Chennai; 4 wickets	Kolkata; 6 wickets	Kolkata; 6 wickets		Mumbai; 5 wickets	Pune; 7 runs	Kolkata; 8 wickets	Kolkata; 5 wickets	Kolkata; 48 runs
Mumbai Indians	Mumbai; 60 runs	Mumbai; 44 runs	Mumbai; 4 runs	Mumbai; 65 runs		Mumbai; 41 runs	Mumbai; 14 runs	Mumbai; 58 runs	Mumbai; 7 wickets
Pune Warriors India	Chennai; 37 runs	Pune; 38 runs	Punjab; 8 wickets	Kolkata; 46 runs	Mumbai; 5 wickets		Pune; 7 wickets	Bengaluru; 17 runs	Hyderabad; 11 runs
Rajasthan Royals	Rajasthan; 5 wickets	Rajasthan; 9 wickets	Rajasthan; 6 wickets	Rajasthan; 19 runs	Rajasthan; 87 runs	Rajasthan; 5 wickets		Rajasthan; 4 wickets	Rajasthan; 8 wickets
Royal Challengers Bengaluru	Bengaluru; 24 runs	Bengaluru; Super Over	Punjab; 7 wickets	Bengaluru; 8 wickets	Bengaluru; 2 runs	Bengaluru; 130 runs	Bengaluru; 7 wickets		Bengaluru; 7 wickets
Sunrisers Hyderabad	Chennai; 77 runs	Hyderabad; 6 wickets	Hyderabad; 5 wickets	Hyderabad; 5 wickets	Hyderabad; 7 wickets	Hyderabad; 22 runs	Hyderabad; 23 runs	Hyderabad; Super Over	

Home team won	Visitor team won

- Note: Results listed are according to the home (horizontal) and visitor (vertical) teams.
- Note: Click on a result to see a summary of the match.

Team	Group matches																Playoffs			
Team	1	2	3	4	5	6	7	8	9	10	11	12	13	14	15	16	Q1	E	Q2	F
Chennai Super Kings	0	2	4	4	6	8	10	12	14	16	18	18	20	20	22	22	W			L
Delhi Daredevils	0	0	0	0	0	0	2	2	4	6	6	6	6	6	6	6				
Kings XI Punjab	2	2	2	4	4	6	8	8	8	8	10	10	10	12	14	16				
Kolkata Knight Riders	2	2	2	4	4	4	4	6	6	6	8	8	10	12	12	12				
Mumbai Indians	0	2	4	6	6	6	8	10	12	12	14	16	18	20	22	22	L		W	W
Pune Warriors India	0	0	2	2	4	4	4	4	4	4	4	4	4	4	6	8				
Rajasthan Royals	2	4	4	6	8	8	8	10	12	12	14	16	18	20	20	20		W	L	
Royal Challengers Bengaluru	2	2	4	6	6	8	10	12	12	12	14	14	16	16	16	18				
Sunrisers Hyderabad	2	4	4	6	6	8	10	10	10	12	14	14	16	16	18	20		L		

Win	Loss	No result

- Note: The total points at the end of each group match are listed.
- Note: Click on the points (group matches) or W/L (playoffs) to see the match summary.

=== Fixtures ===
3 April
20:00 (D/N)
Scorecard

Delhi Daredevils; 128 (20 overs)	v	Kolkata Knight Riders (H); 129/4 (18.4 overs)
Mahela Jayawardene 66 (52); Sunil Narine 4/13 (4 overs)		Gautam Gambhir 41 (29); Shahbaz Nadeem 2/22 (4 overs)

Kolkata won by 6 wickets
Eden Gardens, Kolkata
Umpires: S. Ravi (Ind) and Simon Taufel (Aus)
Player of the match: Sunil Narine (KKR)

- Kolkata Knight Riders won the toss and elected to field.

4 April
20:00 (D/N)
Scorecard

(H) Royal Challengers Bangalore; 156/5 (20 overs)	v	Mumbai Indians; 154/5 (20 overs)
Chris Gayle 92* (58); Jasprit Bumrah 3/32 (4 overs)		Dinesh Karthik 60 (37); Vinay Kumar 3/27 (4 overs)

Bangalore won by 2 runs
M. Chinnaswamy Stadium, Bangalore
Umpires: Vineet Kulkarni (Ind) and Chettithody Shamsuddin (Ind)
Player of the match: Chris Gayle (RCB)

- Mumbai Indians won the toss and elected to field.
- This was the first time that the Royal Challengers Bangalore had defeated the Mumbai Indians at home.

5 April
20:00 (D/N)
Scorecard

(H) Sunrisers Hyderabad; 126/6 (20 overs)	v	Pune Warriors India; 104 (18.5 overs)
Thisara Perera 30 (18); Ashok Dinda 2/29 (4 overs)		Robin Uthappa 24 (22); Dale Steyn 3/11 (3.5 overs)

Hyderabad won by 22 runs
Rajiv Gandhi International Cricket Stadium, Hyderabad
Umpires: S. Ravi (Ind) and Simon Taufel (Aus)
Player of the match: Amit Mishra (SRH)

- Pune Warriors India won the toss and elected to field.
- This was the Sunrisers debut match in the IPL.

6 April
16:00 (D/N)
Scorecard

Rajasthan Royals; 165/7 (20 overs)	v	Delhi Daredevils (H); 160/6 (20 overs)
Rahul Dravid 65 (51); Umesh Yadav 4/24 (4 overs)		David Warner 77 (56); Kevon Cooper 3/30 (4 overs)

Rajasthan won by 5 runs
Feroz Shah Kotla, Delhi
Umpires: Subroto Das (Ind) and Chettithody Shamsuddin (Ind)
Player of the match: Rahul Dravid (RR)

- Rajasthan Royals won the toss and elected to bat.

6 April
20:00 (D/N)
Scorecard

Mumbai Indians; 148/6 (20 overs)	v	Chennai Super Kings (H); 139/9 (20 overs)
Kieron Pollard 57* (38); Dwayne Bravo 2/44 (4 overs)		Mahendra Singh Dhoni 51 (26); Munaf Patel 3/29 (4 overs)

Mumbai won by 9 runs
M. A. Chidambaram Stadium, Chennai
Umpires: Marais Erasmus (SA) and Vineet Kulkarni (Ind)
Player of the match: Kieron Pollard (MI)

- Mumbai Indians won the toss and elected to bat.

7 April
16:00 (D/N)
Scorecard

(H) Pune Warriors India; 99/9 (20 overs)	v	Kings XI Punjab; 100/2 (12.2 overs)
Abhishek Nayar 25* (26); Azhar Mahmood 2/19 (4 overs)		Manan Vohra 43* (28); Angelo Mathews 1/12 (2 overs)

Punjab won by 8 wickets
Subrata Roy Sahara Stadium, Pune
Umpires: Sudhir Asnani (Ind) and Simon Taufel (Aus)
Player of the match: Manan Vohra (KXIP)

- Pune Warriors India won the toss and elected to bat.

7 April
20:00 (D/N)
Scorecard

Royal Challengers Bangalore; 130/8 (20 overs)	v	Sunrisers Hyderabad (H); 130/7 (20 overs)
Virat Kohli 46 (44); Ishant Sharma 3/27 (4 overs)		Hanuma Vihari 44* (46); Moisés Henriques 2/14 (3 overs)

Scores level; Hyderabad won the Super Over by 5 runs
Rajiv Gandhi International Cricket Stadium, Hyderabad
Umpires: Anil Chaudhary (Ind) and S. Ravi (Ind)
Player of the match: Hanuma Vihari (SRH)

- Royal Challengers Bangalore won the toss and elected to bat.

8 April
20:00 (D/N)
Scorecard

(H) Rajasthan Royals; 144/6 (20 overs)	v	Kolkata Knight Riders; 125 (19 overs)
Brad Hodge 46* (31); Sunil Narine 2/28 (4 overs)		Eoin Morgan 51 (38); Kevon Cooper 3/15 (4 overs)

Rajasthan won by 19 runs
Sawai Mansingh Stadium, Jaipur
Umpires: Aleem Dar (Pak) and Subroto Das (Ind)
Player of the match: Siddharth Trivedi (RR)

- Kolkata Knight Riders won the toss and elected to field.

9 April
16:00 (D/N)
Scorecard

Sunrisers Hyderabad; 161/6 (20 overs)	v	Royal Challengers Bangalore (H); 162/3 (17.4 overs)
Cameron White 52 (34); R. P. Singh 3/27 (4 overs)		Virat Kohli 93* (47); Cameron White 1/14 (1 over)

Bangalore won by 7 wickets
M. Chinnaswamy Stadium, Bangalore
Umpires: S. Ravi (Ind) and Simon Taufel (Aus)
Player of the match: Virat Kohli (RCB)

- Sunrisers Hyderabad won the toss and elected to bat.

9 April
20:00 (D/N)
Scorecard

(H) Mumbai Indians; 209/5 (20 overs)	v	Delhi Daredevils; 165/9 (20 overs)
Dinesh Karthik 86 (48); Ashish Nehra 2/49 (4 overs)		David Warner 61 (37); Pragyan Ojha 2/34 (4 overs)

Mumbai won by 44 runs
Wankhede Stadium, Mumbai
Umpires: Marais Erasmus (SA) and Vineet Kulkarni (Ind)
Player of the match: Dinesh Karthik (MI)

- Mumbai Indians won the toss and elected to bat.

10 April
20:00 (D/N)
Scorecard

(H) Kings XI Punjab; 138 (19.5 overs)	v	Chennai Super Kings; 139/0 (17.2 overs)
David Hussey 41 (36); Dwayne Bravo 3/27 (4 overs)		Michael Hussey 86* (54)

Chennai won by 10 wickets
Punjab Cricket Association Stadium, Mohali
Umpires: Aleem Dar (Pak) and Chettithody Shamsuddin (Ind)
Player of the match: Michael Hussey (CSK)

- Chennai Super Kings won the toss and elected to field.

11 April
16:00 (D/N)
Scorecard

Kolkata Knight Riders; 154/8 (20 overs)	v	Royal Challengers Bangalore (H); 158/2 (17.3 overs)
Gautam Gambhir 59 (46); R. P. Singh 3/27 (4 overs)		Chris Gayle 85* (50); Lakshmipathy Balaji 1/33 (3.3 overs)

Bangalore won by 8 wickets
M. Chinnaswamy Stadium, Bangalore
Umpires: Asad Rauf (Pak) and Anil Chaudhary (Ind)
Player of the match: Chris Gayle (RCB)

- Royal Challengers Bangalore won the toss and elected to field.

11 April
20:00 (D/N)
Scorecard

Rajasthan Royals; 145/5 (20 overs)	v	Pune Warriors India (H); 148/3 (18.4 overs)
Rahul Dravid 54 (48); Rahul Sharma 2/16 (4 overs)		Aaron Finch 64 (53); James Faulkner 2/17 (4 overs)

Pune won by 7 wickets
Subrata Roy Sahara Stadium, Pune
Umpires: Marais Erasmus (SA) and Krishnaraj Srinath (Ind)
Player of the match: Aaron Finch (PWI)

- Rajasthan Royals won the toss and elected to bat.

12 April
20:00 (D/N)
Scorecard

(H) Delhi Daredevils; 114/8 (20 overs)	v	Sunrisers Hyderabad; 115/7 (19.2 overs)
Kedar Jadhav 30 (20); Dale Steyn 2/11 (4 overs)		Kumar Sangakkara 28 (28); Shahbaz Nadeem 2/17 (4 overs)

Hyderabad won by 3 wickets
Feroz Shah Kotla, Delhi
Umpires: Aleem Dar (Pak) and Subroto Das (Ind)
Player of the match: Amit Mishra (SRH)

- Delhi Daredevils won the toss and elected to bat.

13 April
16:00 (D/N)
Scorecard

(H) Mumbai Indians; 183/3 (20 overs)	v	Pune Warriors India; 142/8 (20 overs)
Rohit Sharma 62* (32); Aaron Finch 1/11 (2 overs)		Mitchell Marsh 38 (26); Mitchell Johnson 3/33 (4 overs)

Mumbai won by 41 runs
Wankhede Stadium, Mumbai
Umpires: S. Ravi (Ind) and Simon Taufel (Aus)
Player of the match: Rohit Sharma (MI)

- Mumbai Indians won the toss and elected to bat.

13 April
20:00 (D/N)
Scorecard

Royal Challengers Bangalore; 165/6 (20 overs)	v	Chennai Super Kings (H); 166/6 (19.5 overs)
AB de Villiers 64 (32); Chris Morris 3/40 (4 overs)		Ravindra Jadeja 38* (20); Ravi Rampaul 3/31 (4 overs)

Chennai won by 4 wickets
M. A. Chidambaram Stadium, Chennai
Umpires: Asad Rauf (Pak) and Anil Chaudhary (Ind)
Player of the match: Ravindra Jadeja (CSK)

- Chennai Super Kings won the toss and elected to field.

14 April
16:00 (D/N)
Scorecard

(H) Kolkata Knight Riders; 180/4 (20 overs)	v	Sunrisers Hyderabad; 132/7 (20 overs)
Gautam Gambhir 53 (45); Karan Sharma 1/13 (2 overs)		Thisara Perera 36 (25); Jacques Kallis 3/13 (4 overs)

Kolkata won by 48 runs
Eden Gardens, Kolkata
Umpires: Marais Erasmus (SA) and Vineet Kulkarni (Ind)
Player of the match: Gautam Gambhir (KKR)

- Kolkata Knight Riders won the toss and elected to bat.

14 April
20:00 (D/N)
Scorecard

Kings XI Punjab; 124 (18.5 overs)	v	Rajasthan Royals (H); 126/4 (19.2 overs)
David Hussey 41 (34); Sreesanth 2/20 (4 overs)		Ajinkya Rahane 34* (42); Praveen Kumar 2/10 (4 overs)

Rajasthan won by 6 wickets
Sawai Mansingh Stadium, Jaipur
Umpires: Aleem Dar (Pak) and Chettithody Shamsuddin (Ind)
Player of the match: James Faulkner (RR)

- Rajasthan Royals won the toss and elected to field.

15 April
20:00 (D/N)
Scorecard

Pune Warriors India; 159/5 (20 overs)	v	Chennai Super Kings (H); 135/8 (20 overs)
Aaron Finch 67 (45); Chris Morris 2/25 (4 overs)		Subramaniam Badrinath 34 (26); Bhuvneshwar Kumar 2/12 (4 overs)

Pune won by 24 runs
M. A. Chidambaram Stadium, Chennai
Umpires: Asad Rauf (Pak) and Anil Chaudhary (Ind)
Player of the match: Steve Smith (PWI)

- Pune Warriors India won the toss and elected to bat.

16 April
16:00 (D/N)
Scorecard

(H) Kings XI Punjab; 157/9 (20 overs)	v	Kolkata Knight Riders; 153/9 (20 overs)
Manpreet Gony 42 (18); Jacques Kallis 3/24 (4 overs)		Gautam Gambhir 60 (39); Azhar Mahmood 3/21 (4 overs)

Punjab won by 4 runs
Punjab Cricket Association Stadium, Mohali
Umpires: Simon Taufel (Aus) and CK Nandan (Ind)
Player of the match: Manpreet Gony (KXIP)

- Kolkata Knight Riders won the toss and elected to field.
- Sunil Narine (KKR) took a hat-trick.

16 April
20:00 (D/N)
Scorecard

Delhi Daredevils; 152/5 (20 overs)	v	Royal Challengers Bangalore (H); 152/7 (20 overs)
Kedar Jadhav 29* (16); Jaydev Unadkat 2/24 (4 overs)		Virat Kohli 65 (50); Umesh Yadav 2/22 (4 overs)

Scores level; Bangalore won the Super Over by 4 runs
M. Chinnaswamy Stadium, Bangalore
Umpires: Marais Erasmus (SA) and Vineet Kulkarni (Ind)
Player of the match: Virat Kohli (RCB)

- Royal Challengers Bangalore won the toss and elected to field.

17 April
16:00 (D/N)
Scorecard

Sunrisers Hyderabad; 119/8 (20 overs)	v	Pune Warriors India (H); 108 (19 overs)
Biplab Samantray 37 (37); Bhuvneshwar Kumar 3/18 (4 overs)		Robin Uthappa 22 (14); Amit Mishra 4/19 (4 overs)

Hyderabad won by 11 runs
Subrata Roy Sahara Stadium, Pune
Umpires: Asad Rauf (Pak) and Anil Chaudhary (Ind)
Player of the match: Amit Mishra (SRH)

- Pune Warriors India won the toss and elected to field.
- Amit Mishra (SRH) became the first player to get three hat-tricks in IPL.

17 April
20:00 (D/N)
Scorecard

(H) Rajasthan Royals; 179/3 (20 overs)	v	Mumbai Indians; 92 (18.2 overs)
Ajinkya Rahane 68* (54); Kieron Pollard 1/24 (2 overs)		Dinesh Karthik 30 (32); James Faulkner 3/16 (3.2 overs)

Rajasthan won by 87 runs
Sawai Mansingh Stadium, Jaipur
Umpires: Aleem Dar (Pak) and Chettithody Shamsuddin (Ind)
Player of the match: Ajinkya Rahane (RR)

- Rajasthan Royals won the toss and elected to bat.

18 April
20:00 (D/N)
Scorecard

Chennai Super Kings; 169/4 (20 overs)	v	Delhi Daredevils (H); 83 (17.3 overs)
Michael Hussey 65* (50); Irfan Pathan 1/30 (4 overs)		Kedar Jadhav 31 (28); Mohit Sharma 3/10 (3 overs)

Chennai won by 86 runs
Feroz Shah Kotla, Delhi
Umpires: Marais Erasmus (SA) and Vineet Kulkarni (Ind)
Player of the match: Michael Hussey (CSK)

- Chennai Super Kings won the toss and elected to bat.

19 April
20:00 (D/N)
Scorecard

Kings XI Punjab; 123/9 (20 overs)	v	Sunrisers Hyderabad (H); 127/5 (18.5 overs)
Adam Gilchrist 26 (25); Karan Sharma 2/19 (3 overs)		Hanuma Vihari 46 (39); Manpreet Gony 2/24 (4 overs)

Hyderabad won by 5 wickets
Rajiv Gandhi International Cricket Stadium, Hyderabad
Umpires: Kumar Dharmasena (SL) and CK Nandan (Ind)
Player of the match: Hanuma Vihari (SRH)

- Kings XI Punjab won the toss and elected to bat.

20 April
16:00 (D/N)
Scorecard

(H) Kolkata Knight Riders; 119/9 (20 overs)	v	Chennai Super Kings; 124/6 (19.1 overs)
Gautam Gambhir 25 (19); Ravindra Jadeja 3/20 (4 overs)		Michael Hussey 40 (51); Yusuf Pathan 1/9 (1.1 overs)

Chennai won by 4 wickets
Eden Gardens, Kolkata
Umpires: Asad Rauf (Pak) and Anil Chaudhary (Ind)
Player of the match: Ravindra Jadeja (CSK)

- Kolkata Knight Riders won the toss and elected to bat.

20 April
20:00 (D/N)
Scorecard

Rajasthan Royals; 117 (19.4 overs)	v	Royal Challengers Bangalore (H); 123/3 (17.5 overs)
Rahul Dravid 35 (31); R. P. Singh 3/13 (4 overs)		Chris Gayle 49* (44); Shane Watson 2/11 (2 overs)

Bangalore won by 7 wickets
M. Chinnaswamy Stadium, Bangalore
Umpires: Aleem Dar (Pak) and Chettithody Shamsuddin (Ind)
Player of the match: Vinay Kumar (RCB)

- Royal Challengers Bangalore won the toss and elected to field.

21 April
16:00 (D/N)
Scorecard

Mumbai Indians; 161/4 (20 overs)	v	Delhi Daredevils (H); 165/1 (17 overs)
Rohit Sharma 73 (43); Umesh Yadav 2/31 (4 overs)		Virender Sehwag 95* (57); Lasith Malinga 1/26 (4 overs)

Delhi won by 9 wickets
Feroz Shah Kotla, Delhi
Umpires: Kumar Dharmasena (SL) and S. Ravi (Ind)
Player of the match: Virender Sehwag (DD)

- Mumbai Indians won the toss and elected to bat.

21 April
20:00 (D/N)
Scorecard

Pune Warriors India; 185/4 (20 overs)	v	Kings XI Punjab (H); 186/3 (19.5 overs)
Aaron Finch 64 (42); Azhar Mahmood 2/42 (4 overs)		David Miller 80* (41); Yuvraj Singh 1/15 (2 overs)

Punjab won by 7 wickets
Punjab Cricket Association Stadium, Mohali
Umpires: Marais Erasmus (SA) and Krishnaraj Srinath (Ind)
Player of the match: David Miller (KXIP)

- Kings XI Punjab won the toss and elected to field.

22 April
20:00 (D/N)
Scorecard

Rajasthan Royals; 185/4 (20 overs)	v	Chennai Super Kings (H); 186/5 (19.5 overs)
Shane Watson 101 (61); Ravichandran Ashwin 2/20 (4 overs)		Michael Hussey 88 (51); James Faulkner 3/20 (4 overs)

Chennai won by 5 wickets
M. A. Chidambaram Stadium, Chennai
Umpires: Sudhir Asnani (Ind) and Anil Chaudhary (Ind)
Player of the match: Michael Hussey (CSK)

- Rajasthan Royals won the toss and elected to bat.

23 April
16:00 (D/N)
Scorecard

(H) Royal Challengers Bangalore; 263/5 (20 overs)	v	Pune Warriors India; 133/9 (20 overs)
Chris Gayle 175* (66); Ashok Dinda 2/48 (4 overs)		Steve Smith 41 (31); Chris Gayle 2/5 (1 over)

Bangalore won by 130 runs
M. Chinnaswamy Stadium, Bangalore
Umpires: Aleem Dar (Pak) and Chettithody Shamsuddin (Ind)
Player of the match: Chris Gayle (RCB)

- Pune Warriors India won the toss and elected to field.
- Chris Gayle made the fastest century and highest individual score in Twenty20 cricket.
- Bangalore's total was the highest in Twenty20 cricket.

23 April
20:00 (D/N)
Scorecard

(H) Delhi Daredevils; 120/7 (20 overs)	v	Kings XI Punjab; 121/5 (17 overs)
David Warner 40 (36); Harmeet Singh 3/24 (4 overs)		David Miller 34* (39); Roelof van der Merwe 1/17 (4 overs)

Punjab won by 5 wickets
Feroz Shah Kotla, Delhi
Umpires: Vineet Kulkarni (Ind) and Krishnaraj Srinath (Ind)
Player of the match: Harmeet Singh (KXIP)

- Kings XI Punjab won the toss and elected to field.

24 April
20:00 (D/N)
Scorecard

(H) Kolkata Knight Riders; 159/6 (20 overs)	v	Mumbai Indians; 162/5 (19.5 overs)
Jacques Kallis 37 (38); Pragyan Ojha 2/21 (4 overs)		Dwayne Smith 62 (45); Sunil Narine 3/17 (4 overs)

Mumbai won by 5 wickets
Eden Gardens, Kolkata
Umpires: Kumar Dharmasena (SL) and S. Ravi (Ind)
Player of the match: Dwayne Smith (MI)

- Kolkata Knight Riders won the toss and elected to bat.

25 April
20:00 (D/N)
Scorecard

Sunrisers Hyderabad; 159/6 (20 overs)	v	Chennai Super Kings (H); 160/5 (19.4 overs)
Shikhar Dhawan 63* (45); Mohit Sharma 2/33 (4 overs)		Mahendra Singh Dhoni 67* (37); Amit Mishra 3/26 (4 overs)

Chennai won by 5 wickets
M. A. Chidambaram Stadium, Chennai
Umpires: Aleem Dar (Pak) and Subroto Das (Ind)
Player of the match: Mahendra Singh Dhoni (CSK)

- Sunrisers Hyderabad won the toss and elected to bat.

26 April
20:00 (D/N)
Scorecard

Kings XI Punjab; 149/6 (20 overs)	v	Kolkata Knight Riders (H); 150/4 (18.2 overs)
Manan Vohra 31 (21); Jacques Kallis 2/14 (4 overs)		Manvinder Bisla 51* (44); Azhar Mahmood 3/35 (4 overs)

Kolkata won by 6 wickets
Eden Gardens, Kolkata
Umpires: S. Ravi and CK Nandan (Ind)
Player of the match: Jacques Kallis (KKR)

- Kings XI Punjab won the toss and elected to bat.

27 April
16:00 (D/N)
Scorecard

Sunrisers Hyderabad; 144/9 (20 overs)	v	Rajasthan Royals (H); 146/2 (17.5 overs)
Darren Sammy 60 (41); James Faulkner 5/20 (4 overs)		Shane Watson 98* (53); Dale Steyn 1/15 (4 overs)

Rajasthan won by 8 wickets
Sawai Mansingh Stadium, Jaipur
Umpires: Vineet Kulkarni (Ind) and Krishnaraj Srinath (Ind)
Player of the match: James Faulkner (RR)

- Sunrisers Hyderabad won the toss and elected to bat.

27 April
20:00 (D/N)
Scorecard

(H) Mumbai Indians; 194/7 (20 overs)	v	Royal Challengers Bangalore; 136/7 (20 overs)
Dwayne Smith 50 (36); Ravi Rampaul 1/35 (4 overs)		Vinay Kumar 26* (20); Dhawal Kulkarni 3/19 (4 overs)

Mumbai won by 58 runs
Wankhede Stadium, Mumbai
Umpires: Asad Rauf (Pak) and Sudhir Asnani (Ind)
Player of the match: Dwayne Smith (MI)

- Mumbai Indians won the toss and elected to bat.

28 April
16:00 (D/N)
Scorecard

(H) Chennai Super Kings; 200/3 (20 overs)	v	Kolkata Knight Riders; 186/4 (20 overs)
Michael Hussey 95 (59); Rajat Bhatia 1/31 (4 overs)		Manvinder Bisla 92 (61); Mohit Sharma 1/23 (4 overs)

Chennai won by 14 runs
M. A. Chidambaram Stadium, Chennai
Umpires: Aleem Dar (Pak) and Simon Taufel (Aus)
Player of the match: Michael Hussey (CSK)

- Kolkata Knight Riders won the toss and elected to field.

28 April
20:00 (D/N)
Scorecard

(H) Delhi Daredevils; 164/5 (20 overs)	v	Pune Warriors India; 149/4 (20 overs)
David Warner 51* (25); Ashok Dinda 3/31 (4 overs)		Finch, Uthappa 37 (33); Umesh Yadav 2/24 (4 overs)

Delhi won by 15 runs
Raipur International Cricket Stadium, Raipur
Umpires: S. Ravi (Ind) and CK Nandan (Ind)
Player of the match: David Warner (DD)

- Pune Warriors India won the toss and elected to field.

29 April
16:00 (D/N)
Scorecard

Royal Challengers Bangalore; 171/6 (20 overs)	v	Rajasthan Royals (H); 173/6 (19.5 overs)
Chris Gayle 34 (16); Shane Watson 3/22 (4 overs)		Sanju Samson 63 (41); Ravi Rampaul 2/28 (4 overs)

Rajasthan won by 4 wickets
Sawai Mansingh Stadium, Jaipur
Umpires: Marais Erasmus (SA) and Krishnaraj Srinath (Ind)
Player of the match: Sanju Samson (RR)

- Rajasthan Royals won the toss and elected to field.
- Sanju Samson became the youngest player at 18 years, 5 months, and 18 days to score a half-century in the IPL.

29 April
20:00 (D/N)
Scorecard

(H) Mumbai Indians; 174/3 (20 overs)	v	Kings XI Punjab; 170 (20 overs)
Rohit Sharma 79* (39); Praveen Kumar 1/24 (4 overs)		David Miller 56 (34); Harbhajan Singh 3/14 (4 overs)

Mumbai won by 4 runs
Wankhede Stadium, Mumbai
Umpires: Asad Rauf (Pak) and Anil Chaudhary (Ind)
Player of the match: Rohit Sharma (MI)

- Mumbai Indians won the toss and elected to bat.

30 April
20:00 (D/N)
Scorecard

Chennai Super Kings; 164/3 (20 overs)	v	Pune Warriors India (H); 127/9 (20 overs)
Suresh Raina 63* (50); Rahul Sharma 1/27 (4 overs)		Steve Smith 35 (39); Mohit Sharma 3/21 (4 overs)

Chennai won by 37 runs
Subrata Roy Sahara Stadium, Pune
Umpires: Simon Taufel (Aus) and Subroto Das (Ind)
Player of the match: Mahendra Singh Dhoni (CSK)

- Chennai Super Kings won the toss and elected to bat.

1 May
16:00 (D/N)
Scorecard

Mumbai Indians; 129/4 (20 overs)	v	Sunrisers Hyderabad (H); 130/3 (18 overs)
Dwayne Smith 38 (40); Ishant Sharma 2/15 (4 overs)		Shikhar Dhawan 73* (55); Dhawal Kulkarni 1/13 (2 overs)

Hyderabad won by 7 wickets
Rajiv Gandhi International Cricket Stadium, Hyderabad
Umpires: Asad Rauf (Pak) and Sudhir Asnani (Ind)
Player of the match: Ishant Sharma (SRH)

- Mumbai Indians won the toss and elected to bat.

1 May
20:00 (D/N)
Scorecard

Kolkata Knight Riders; 136/7 (20 overs)	v	Delhi Daredevils (H); 137/3 (17.5 overs)
Rajat Bhatia 26* (26); Umesh Yadav 2/36 (4 overs)		David Warner 66* (42); Brett Lee 1/26 (4 overs)

Delhi won by 7 wickets
Raipur International Cricket Stadium, Raipur
Umpires: Kumar Dharmasena (SL) and CK Nandan (Ind)
Player of the match: David Warner (DD)

- Kolkata Knight Riders won the toss and elected to bat.

2 May
16:00 (D/N)
Scorecard

(H) Chennai Super Kings; 186/4 (20 overs)	v	Kings XI Punjab; 171/6 (20 overs)
Suresh Raina 100* (53); Parvinder Awana 2/29 (4 overs)		Shaun Marsh 73 (51); Dwayne Bravo 3/34 (4 overs)

Chennai won by 15 runs
M. A. Chidambaram Stadium, Chennai
Umpires: Marais Erasmus (SA) and Vineet Kulkarni (Ind)
Player of the match: Suresh Raina (CSK)

- Chennai Super Kings won the toss and elected to bat.

2 May
20:00 (D/N)
Scorecard

Royal Challengers Bangalore; 187/3 (20 overs)	v	Pune Warriors India (H); 170/9 (20 overs)
Saurabh Tiwary 52 (45); Ashok Dinda 2/52 (4 overs)		Robin Uthappa 75 (45); Vinay Kumar 3/31 (4 overs)

Bangalore won by 17 runs
Subrata Roy Sahara Stadium, Pune
Umpires: Aleem Dar (Pak) and Chettithody Shamsuddin (Ind)
Player of the match: AB de Villiers (RCB)

- Royal Challengers Bangalore won the toss and elected to bat.

3 May
20:00 (D/N)
Scorecard

Rajasthan Royals; 132/6 (20 overs)	v	Kolkata Knight Riders (H); 133/2 (17.2 overs)
Sanju Samson 40 (36); Sachithra Senanayake 2/26 (4 overs)		Yusuf Pathan 49* (35); Shane Watson 1/21 (3 overs)

Kolkata won by 8 wickets
Eden Gardens, Kolkata
Umpires: Kumar Dharmasena (SL) and CK Nandan (Ind)
Player of the match: Yusuf Pathan (KKR)

- Rajasthan Royals won the toss and elected to bat.

4 May
20:00 (D/N)
Scorecard

Delhi Daredevils; 80 (19.1 overs)	v	Sunrisers Hyderabad (H); 81/4 (13.5 overs)
Unmukt Chand 17 (24); Darren Sammy 2/10 (3 overs)		Shikhar Dhawan 22 (16); Johan Botha 2/11 (3 overs)

Hyderabad won by 6 wickets
Rajiv Gandhi International Cricket Stadium, Hyderabad
Umpires: Asad Rauf (Pak) and Sudhir Asnani (Ind)
Player of the match: Darren Sammy (SRH)

- Delhi Daredevils won the toss and elected to bat.

5 May
16:00 (D/N)
Scorecard

(H) Mumbai Indians; 139/5 (20 overs)	v	Chennai Super Kings; 79 (15.2 overs)
Rohit Sharma 39* (30); Ravindra Jadeja 3/29 (4 overs)		Michael Hussey 22 (26); Pragyan Ojha 3/11 (2.2 overs)

Mumbai won by 60 runs
Wankhede Stadium, Mumbai
Umpires: Kumar Dharmasena (SL) and CK Nandan (Ind)
Player of the match: Mitchell Johnson (MI)

- Mumbai Indians won the toss and elected to bat.

5 May
20:00 (D/N)
Scorecard

Pune Warriors India; 178/4 (20 overs)	v	Rajasthan Royals (H); 182/5 (19.5 overs)
Robin Uthappa 54 (41); Siddharth Trivedi 1/33 (4 overs)		Ajinkya Rahane 67 (48); Wayne Parnell 3/27 (3.5 overs)

Rajasthan won by 5 wickets
Sawai Mansingh Stadium, Jaipur
Umpires: Rod Tucker (Aus) and Chettithody Shamsuddin (Ind)
Player of the match: Ajinkya Rahane (RR)

- Pune Warriors India won the toss and elected to bat.
- As a result of this match, Pune Warriors India were eliminated.

6 May
20:00 (D/N)
Scorecard

Royal Challengers Bangalore; 190/3 (20 overs)	v	Kings XI Punjab (H); 194/4 (18 overs)
Chris Gayle 61 (33); Manpreet Gony 2/41 (4 overs)		David Miller 101* (38); Murali Kartik 2/24 (3 overs)

Punjab won by 6 wickets
Punjab Cricket Association Stadium, Mohali
Umpires: Nigel Llong (Eng) and Vineet Kulkarni (Ind)
Player of the match: David Miller (KXIP)

- Kings XI Punjab won the toss and elected to field.
- David Miller's century was the third fastest in the IPL.

7 May
16:00 (D/N)
Scorecard

Delhi Daredevils; 154/4 (20 overs)	v	Rajasthan Royals (H); 155/1 (17.5 overs)
Ben Rohrer 64* (40); Stuart Binny 1/3 (2 overs)		Ajinkya Rahane 63* (45); Siddharth Kaul 1/23 (3.5 overs)

Rajasthan won by 9 wickets
Sawai Mansingh Stadium, Jaipur
Umpires: Rod Tucker (Aus) and Aleem Dar (Pak)
Player of the match: Ajinkya Rahane (RR)

- Delhi Daredevils won the toss and elected to bat.

7 May
20:00 (D/N)
Scorecard

(H) Mumbai Indians; 170/6 (20 overs)	v	Kolkata Knight Riders; 105 (18.2 overs)
Sachin Tendulkar 48 (28); Ryan McLaren 2/60 (4 overs)		Jacques Kallis 24 (26); Harbhajan Singh 3/27 (4 overs)

Mumbai won by 65 runs
Wankhede Stadium, Mumbai
Umpires: Kumar Dharmasena (SL) and S. Ravi (Ind)
Player of the match: Sachin Tendulkar (MI)

- Mumbai Indians won the toss and elected to bat.

8 May
20:00 (D/N)
Scorecard

Chennai Super Kings; 223/3 (20 overs)	v	Sunrisers Hyderabad (H); 146/8 (20 overs)
Suresh Raina 99* (52); Thisara Perera 3/45 (4 overs)		Parthiv Patel 44 (30); Mohit Sharma 2/28 (4 overs)

Chennai won by 77 runs
Rajiv Gandhi International Cricket Stadium, Hyderabad
Umpires: Nigel Llong (Eng) and Subroto Das (Ind)
Player of the match: Suresh Raina (CSK)

- Sunrisers Hyderabad won the toss and elected to field.

9 May
16:00 (D/N)
Scorecard

(H) Kings XI Punjab; 145/6 (20 overs)	v	Rajasthan Royals; 147/2 (19 overs)
Shaun Marsh 77 (64); Kevon Cooper 3/23 (4 overs)		Ajinkya Rahane 59* (49); Bipul Sharma 1/21 (4 overs)

Rajasthan won by 8 wickets
Punjab Cricket Association Stadium, Mohali
Umpires: Kumar Dharmasena (SL) and S. Ravi (Ind)
Player of the match: Kevon Cooper (RR)

- Rajasthan Royals won the toss and elected to field.

9 May
20:00 (D/N)
Scorecard

Kolkata Knight Riders; 152/6 (20 overs)	v	Pune Warriors India (H); 106 (19.3 overs)
Gautam Gambhir 50 (44); Bhuvneshwar Kumar 3/25 (4 overs)		Angelo Mathews 40 (28); Lakshmipathy Balaji 3/19 (3.3 overs)

Kolkata won by 46 runs
Subrata Roy Sahara Stadium, Pune
Umpires: Asad Rauf (Pak) and Sudhir Asnani (Ind)
Player of the match: Gautam Gambhir (KKR)

- Kolkata Knight Riders won the toss and elected to bat.

10 May
20:00 (D/N)
Scorecard

Royal Challengers Bangalore; 183/4 (20 overs)	v	Delhi Daredevils (H); 179/7 (20 overs)
Virat Kohli 99 (58); Shahbaz Nadeem 1/23 (4 overs)		Unmukt Chand 41 (35); Jaydev Unadkat 5/25 (4 overs)

Bangalore won by 4 runs
Feroz Shah Kotla, Delhi
Umpires: Nigel Llong (Eng) and Krishnaraj Srinath (Ind)
Player of the match: Jaydev Unadkat (RCB)

- Delhi Daredevils won the toss and elected to field.
- As a result of this match, Delhi Daredevils were eliminated.

11 May
16:00 (D/N)
Scorecard

(H) Pune Warriors India; 112/8 (20 overs)	v	Mumbai Indians; 116/5 (18.5 overs)
Yuvraj Singh 33 (29); Mitchell Johnson 2/8 (4 overs)		Rohit Sharma 37 (41); Ashok Dinda 2/35 (4 overs)

Mumbai won by 5 wickets
Subrata Roy Sahara Stadium, Pune
Umpires: Asad Rauf (Pak) and Anil Chaudhary (Ind)
Player of the match: Mitchell Johnson (MI)

- Pune Warriors India won the toss and elected to bat.

11 May
20:00 (D/N)
Scorecard

Sunrisers Hyderabad; 150/7 (20 overs)	v	Kings XI Punjab (H); 120/9 (20 overs)
Parthiv Patel 61 (47); Sandeep Sharma 3/21 (4 overs)		Luke Pomersbach 33 (40); Darren Sammy 4/22 (4 overs)

Hyderabad won by 30 runs
Punjab Cricket Association Stadium, Mohali
Umpires: Rod Tucker (Aus) and Subroto Das (Ind)
Player of the match: Parthiv Patel (SRH)

- Kings XI Punjab won the toss and elected to field.

12 May
16:00 (D/N)
Scorecard

Royal Challengers Bangalore; 115/9 (20 overs)	v	Kolkata Knight Riders (H); 116/5 (19.2 overs)
Chris Gayle 33 (36); Sunil Narine 4/22 (4 overs)		Jacques Kallis 41 (45); Vinay Kumar 2/17 (3.2 overs)

Kolkata won by 5 wickets
JSCA International Cricket Stadium, Ranchi
Umpires: Nigel Llong (Eng) and Krishnaraj Srinath (Ind)
Player of the match: Jacques Kallis (KKR)

- Kolkata Knight Riders won the toss and elected to field.

12 May
20:00 (D/N)
Scorecard

Chennai Super Kings; 141/4 (20 overs)	v	Rajasthan Royals (H); 144/5 (17.1 overs)
Murali Vijay 55 (50); Kevon Cooper 2/32 (4 overs)		Shane Watson 70 (34); Jason Holder 2/20 (4 overs)

Rajasthan won by 5 wickets
Sawai Mansingh Stadium, Jaipur
Umpires: Kumar Dharmasena (SL) and C. K. Nandan (Ind)
Player of the match: Shane Watson (RR)

- Rajasthan Royals won the toss and elected to field.

13 May
20:00 (D/N)
Scorecard

Sunrisers Hyderabad; 178/3 (20 overs)	v	Mumbai Indians (H); 184/3 (19.3 overs)
Shikhar Dhawan 59 (41); Lasith Malinga 2/26 (4 overs)		Kieron Pollard 66* (27); Karan Sharma 2/22 (3 overs)

Mumbai won by 7 wickets
Wankhede Stadium, Mumbai
Umpires: Simon Taufel (Aus) and Anil Chaudhary (Ind)
Player of the match: Kieron Pollard (MI)

- Sunrisers Hyderabad won the toss and elected to bat.

14 May
16:00 (D/N)
Scorecard

(H) Royal Challengers Bangalore; 174/5 (20 overs)	v	Kings XI Punjab; 176/3 (18.1 overs)
Chris Gayle 77 (53); Parvinder Awana 3/39 (4 overs)		Adam Gilchrist 85* (54); Zaheer Khan 1/30 (4 overs)

Punjab won by 7 wickets
M. Chinnaswamy Stadium, Bangalore
Umpires: Kumar Dharmasena (SL) and S. Ravi (Ind)
Player of the match: Adam Gilchrist (KXIP)

- Kings XI Punjab won the toss and elected to field.
- As a result of this match, Chennai Super Kings, Mumbai Indians and Rajasthan Royals qualified for the playoff stage.

14 May
20:00 (D/N)
Scorecard

(H) Chennai Super Kings; 168/4 (20 overs)	v	Delhi Daredevils; 135/9 (20 overs)
Mahendra Singh Dhoni 58* (35); Umesh Yadav 2/26 (4 overs)		David Warner 44 (37); Albie Morkel 3/32 (4 overs)

Chennai won by 33 runs
M. A. Chidambaram Stadium, Chennai
Umpires: Rod Tucker (Aus) and Chettithody Shamsuddin (Ind)
Player of the match: Mahendra Singh Dhoni (CSK)

- Chennai Super Kings won the toss and elected to bat.

15 May
16:00 (D/N)
Scorecard

Pune Warriors India; 170/4 (20 overs)	v	Kolkata Knight Riders (H); 163/7 (20 overs)
Manish Pandey 66 (47); Sachithra Senanayake 1/22 (4 overs)		Yusuf Pathan 72 (44); Wayne Parnell 2/34 (4 overs)

Pune won by 7 runs
JSCA International Cricket Stadium, Ranchi
Umpires: Nigel Llong (Eng) and Krishnaraj Srinath (Ind)
Player of the match: Manish Pandey (PWI)

- Kolkata Knight Riders won the toss and elected to field.
- As a result of this match, Kolkata Knight Riders were eliminated.
- Yusuf Pathan became the first player in Twenty20 cricket to be dismissed for obstructing the field.

15 May
20:00 (D/N)
Scorecard

(H) Mumbai Indians; 166/8 (20 overs)	v	Rajasthan Royals; 152/7 (20 overs)
Aditya Tare 59 (37); Shane Watson 2/30 (4 overs)		Brad Hodge 39 (27); Dhawal Kulkarni 2/21 (4 overs)

Mumbai won by 14 runs
Wankhede Stadium, Mumbai
Umpires: Asad Rauf (Pak) and Sudhir Asnani (Ind)
Player of the match: Aditya Tare (MI)

- Rajasthan Royals won the toss and elected to field.

16 May
20:00 (D/N)
Scorecard

(H) Kings XI Punjab; 171/4 (20 overs)	v	Delhi Daredevils; 164/7 (20 overs)
Shaun Marsh 45 (44); Ashish Nehra 2/38 (4 overs)		Ben Rohrer 49 (29); Sandeep Sharma 3/23 (4 overs)

Punjab won by 7 runs
HPCA Stadium, Dharamshala
Umpires: Kumar Dharmasena (SL) and S. Ravi (Ind)
Player of the match: David Miller (KXIP)

- Delhi Daredevils won the toss and elected to field.

17 May
20:00 (D/N)
Scorecard

(H) Sunrisers Hyderabad; 136/9 (20 overs)	v	Rajasthan Royals; 113/9 (20 overs)
Biplab Samantray 55 (46); James Faulkner 5/16 (4 overs)		Kevon Cooper 26 (12); Amit Mishra 2/8 (4 overs)

Hyderabad won by 23 runs
Rajiv Gandhi International Cricket Stadium, Hyderabad
Umpires: Asad Rauf (Pak) and Anil Chaudhary (Ind)
Player of the match: Amit Mishra (SRH)

- Sunrisers Hyderabad won the toss and elected to bat.
- James Faulkner became the first player to take two five-wicket hauls in the IPL.
- As a result of this match, Kings XI Punjab were eliminated, and Chennai Super Kings and Mumbai Indians advanced to Qualifier 1.

18 May
16:00 (D/N)
Scorecard

(H) Kings XI Punjab; 183/8 (20 overs)	v	Mumbai Indians; 133 (19.1 overs)
Azhar Mahmood 80 (44); Lasith Malinga 3/39 (4 overs)		Ambati Rayudu 26 (22); Piyush Chawla 2/20 (4 overs)

Punjab won by 50 runs
HPCA Stadium, Dharamshala
Umpires: Kumar Dharmasena (SL) and C. K. Nandan (Ind)
Player of the match: Azhar Mahmood (KXIP)

- Mumbai Indians won the toss and elected to field.

18 May
20:00 (D/N)
Scorecard

(H) Royal Challengers Bangalore; 106/2 (8 overs)	v	Chennai Super Kings; 82/6 (8 overs)
Virat Kohli 56* (29); Mohit Sharma 1/14 (1 over)		Murali Vijay 32 (19); Zaheer Khan 4/17 (2 overs)

Bangalore won by 24 runs
M. Chinnaswamy Stadium, Bangalore
Umpires: Rod Tucker (Aus) and Chettithody Shamsuddin (Ind)
Player of the match: Virat Kohli (RCB)

- Chennai Super Kings won the toss and elected to field.
- Match reduced to 8 overs per side due to rain.

19 May
16:00 (D/N)
Scorecard

(H) Pune Warriors India; 172/5 (20 overs)	v	Delhi Daredevils; 134/9 (20 overs)
Aaron Finch 52 (34); Siddarth Kaul 2/27 (4 overs)		Muralidharen Gautam 30 (23); Angelo Mathews 3/14 (3 overs)

Pune won by 38 runs
Subrata Roy Sahara Stadium, Pune
Umpires: Nigel Llong (Eng) and Simon Taufel (Aus)
Player of the match: Luke Wright (PWI)

- Pune Warriors India won the toss and elected to bat.

19 May
20:00 (D/N)
Scorecard

Kolkata Knight Riders; 130/7 (20 overs)	v	Sunrisers Hyderabad (H); 132/5 (18.5 overs)
Yusuf Pathan 49* (29); Dale Steyn 2/24 (4 overs)		Parthiv Patel 47 (37); Iqbal Abdulla 3/29 (3.5 overs)

Hyderabad won by 5 wickets
Rajiv Gandhi International Cricket Stadium, Hyderabad
Umpires: Asad Rauf (Pak) and Sudhir Asnani (Ind)
Player of the match: Parthiv Patel (SRH)

- Kolkata Knight Riders won the toss and elected to bat.
- As a result of this match, Royal Challengers Bangalore were eliminated and Sunrisers Hyderabad qualified for the playoff stage.

== Playoffs ==
Qualifier 1 / Eliminator
21 May 2013 — Feroz Shah Kotla, Delhi
1	Chennai Super Kings	192/1 (20 overs)
2	Mumbai Indians	144 (18.4 overs)
22 May 2013 — Feroz Shah Kotla, Delhi
3	Rajasthan Royals	135/6 (19.2 overs)
4	Sunrisers Hyderabad	132/7 (20 overs)

Qualifier 2
24 May 2013 — Eden Gardens, Kolkata
Q1L	Mumbai Indians	169/6 (19.5 overs)
EW	Rajasthan Royals	165/6 (20 overs)

Final
26 May 2013 — Eden Gardens, Kolkata
Q1W	Chennai Super Kings	125/9 (20 overs)
Q2W	Mumbai Indians	148/9 (20 overs)

=== Qualifier 1 ===
21 May 2013
20:00 (D/N)
Scorecard

Chennai Super Kings; 192/1 (20 overs)	v	Mumbai Indians; 144 (18.4 overs)
Michael Hussey 86* (58); Kieron Pollard 1/28 (3 overs)		Dwayne Smith 68 (28); Dwayne Bravo 3/9 (3 overs)

Chennai won by 48 runs
Feroz Shah Kotla, Delhi
Umpires: Nigel Llong (Eng) and Rod Tucker (Aus)
Player of the match: Michael Hussey (CSK)

- Chennai Super Kings won the toss and elected to bat.

=== Eliminator ===
22 May 2013
20:00 (D/N)
Scorecard

Sunrisers Hyderabad; 132/7 (20 overs)	v	Rajasthan Royals; 135/6 (19.2 overs)
Shikhar Dhawan 33 (39); Vikramjeet Malik 2/14 (3 overs)		Brad Hodge 54* (29); Darren Sammy 2/27 (3.2 overs)

Rajasthan won by 4 wickets
Feroz Shah Kotla, Delhi
Umpires: S. Ravi (Ind) and Rod Tucker (Aus)
Player of the match: Brad Hodge (RR)

- Sunrisers Hyderabad won the toss and elected to bat.

=== Qualifier 2 ===
24 May 2013
20:00 (D/N)
Scorecard

Rajasthan Royals; 165/6 (20 overs)	v	Mumbai Indians; 169/6 (19.5 overs)
Rahul Dravid 43 (37); Harbhajan Singh 3/23 (4 overs)		Dwayne Smith 62 (44); Kevon Cooper 2/33 (4 overs)

Mumbai won by 4 wickets
Eden Gardens, Kolkata
Umpires: Simon Taufel (Aus) and Chettithody Shamsuddin (Ind)
Player of the match: Harbhajan Singh (MI)

- Rajasthan Royals won the toss and elected to bat.

=== Final ===
26 May 2013
20:00 (D/N)
Scorecard

Mumbai Indians; 148/9 (20 overs)	v	Chennai Super Kings; 125/9 (20 overs)
Kieron Pollard 60* (32); Dwayne Bravo 4/42 (4 overs)		MS Dhoni 63* (45); Harbhajan Singh 2/14 (3 overs)

Mumbai won by 23 runs
Eden Gardens, Kolkata
Umpires: Kumar Dharmasena (SL) and Simon Taufel (Aus)
Player of the match: Kieron Pollard (MI)

- Mumbai Indians won the toss and elected to bat.

== Statistics ==
=== Most runs ===
Player	Team	Inns	Runs	HS
Michael Hussey	Chennai Super Kings	17	733	95
Chris Gayle	Royal Challengers Bangalore	16	708	175 not out
Virat Kohli	Royal Challengers Bangalore	16	634	99
Suresh Raina	Chennai Super Kings	17	548	100 not out
Shane Watson	Rajasthan Royals	16	543	101

The leading run-scorer of the tournament wore an orange cap while fielding.

=== Most wickets ===
Player	Team	Inns	Wkts	BBI
Dwayne Bravo	Chennai Super Kings	18	32	4/42
James Faulkner	Rajasthan Royals	16	28	5/16
Harbhajan Singh	Mumbai Indians	19	24	3/14
Mitchell Johnson	Mumbai Indians	17	24	3/27
Vinay Kumar	Royal Challengers Bangalore	16	23	3/18

The leading wicket-taker of the tournament wore a purple cap while fielding.
