= Thalaivan Sargunam =

Indian cricketer (born 1985)

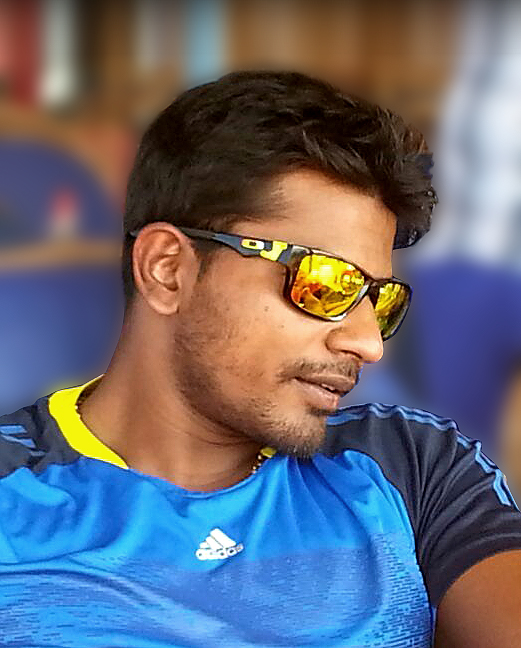

Personal information
- Full name: Xavier Thalaivan Sargunam
- Born: 15 May 1985 (age 41); Nagercoil, Tamil Nadu, India
- Batting: Right-handed
- Role: Batsman

Domestic team information
- Years: Team
- 2008–present: Tamil Nadu
- 2013: Sunrisers Hyderabad

Career statistics
Competition	FC	LA	T20
Matches	7	10	8
Runs scored	102	188	113
Batting average	12.75	20.88	16.14
100s/50s	0/0	0/2	0/0
Top score	35	65*	29
Balls bowled	60	30	–
Wickets	2	1	–
Bowling average	13.50	20	–
5 wickets in innings	0	0	–
10 wickets in match	0	0	–
Best bowling	2/27	1/17	–
Catches/stumpings	1/–	3/–	0/–
- Source: , 30 April 2013

Thalaivan Sargunam is an Indian cricketer and former captain of Indian Universities cricket team, Primarily recognized as a right-handed opening batsman. Thalaivan has showcased his talents in the Indian Premier League (IPL), representing teams such as Sunrisers Hyderabad and Royal Challengers Bangalore (RCB). Hailing from Tamil Nadu, he is esteemed as one of the most explosive batsmen from the region.

Thalaivan's cricketing achievements include holding the distinction of being the sole triple centurion against the formidable Chemplast team in the Tamil Nadu Cricket Association (TNCA) first division league. Furthermore, he has been a pivotal member of three Tamil Nadu Premier League (TNPL) championship-winning squads from 2016 to 2018.

Beyond his on-field exploits, Thalaivan has ventured into cricket administration, currently serving as a selector for prestigious tournaments such as the Ranji Trophy, Deodhar Trophy, and Duleep Trophy, spanning the period of 2023 to 2025. His multifaceted involvement in various aspects of cricket underscores his significant impact on the sport both as a player and as an administrator.
