= Subroto Das =

Indian cricketer

Personal information
- Full name: Subroto Das
- Born: India
- Batting: Right-handed
- Role: Occasional wicket-keeper

Domestic team information
- Years: Team
- 1972/73–1985/86: Bihar

Career statistics
| Competition | First-class | List A |
|---|---|---|
| Matches | 46 | 2 |
| Runs scored | 1,885 | 79 |
| Batting average | 27.31 | 39.50 |
| 100s/50s | 4/6 | 0/1 |
| Top score | 151 | 73 |
| Balls bowled | 30 | – |
| Wickets | 0 | – |
| Bowling average | – | – |
| 5 wickets in innings | – | – |
| 10 wickets in match | – | – |
| Best bowling | – | – |
| Catches/stumpings | 15/0 | 3/0 |
- Source: Cricinfo, 9 August 2012

Subroto Das is a former Indian cricketer who played first-class cricket for Bihar in the Ranji Trophy from 1973 to 1986.

In 2020 Das was appointed head of women's selection sub-committee for the Jharkhand State Cricket Association.
