= Biplab Samantray =

Indian cricketer (born 1988)

Personal information
- Full name: Biplab Bipin Samantray
- Born: 14 December 1988 (age 37); Cuttack, Odisha, India
- Batting: Right-handed
- Bowling: Right-hand medium

Domestic team information
- Years: Team
- 2009–present: Odisha
- 2012: Deccan Chargers
- 2013: Sunrisers Hyderabad

Career statistics
Competition	FC	LA	T20
Matches	46	32	41
Runs scored	2,056	852	558
Batting average	27.78	30.42	17.43
100s/50s	4/6	1/7	0/2
Top score	171	100	73*
Balls bowled	4,440	1,323	455
Wickets	60	33	18
Bowling average	33.76	31.48	26.11
5 wickets in innings	0	0	0
10 wickets in match	0	0	0
Best bowling	3/22	3/24	3/09
Catches/stumpings	38/–	18/–	13/–
- Source: ESPNcricinfo, 11 April 2022

Biplab Samantray (born 14 December 1988) is an Indian cricketer. He is a right-handed bowler and middle order batsman. In first class cricket, he plays for Odisha in Ranji Trophy. He played and captained Katak Barabati Tigers in Odisha Premier League in the inaugural edition and got the Man of the series award. He has played for the Sunrisers Hyderabad in the IPL. He led Odisha to a memorable win against Assam in the third round of the 2015 season. He was also a part of the East Zone team which won its first ever Duleep Trophy in 2011–2012.

In November 2018, he scored his 3,000th run in first-class cricket, batting for Odisha against Haryana in the 2018–19 Ranji Trophy.
