= 2024 Gujarat Titans season =

2024 Indian Premier League cricket team

Gujarat Titans
2024 season
- Coach: Ashish Nehra
- Captain: Shubman Gill
- Ground(s): Narendra Modi Stadium, Ahmedabad
- IPL League: Finished at 8th place
- Most runs: Sai Sudharsan (527)
- Most wickets: Mohit Sharma (13)
- Most catches: Shahrukh Khan (6)
- Most wicket-keeping dismissals: Wriddhiman Saha (7)

The 2024 season was the 3rd season for the Indian Premier League franchise Gujarat Titans. They were one of the ten teams competed in the 2024 Indian Premier League. The Gujarat Titans were the runners-up in previous season after losing the rain-affected 2023 Indian Premier League final to Chennai Super Kings. The Gujarat Titans drew an average home attendance of 62,541 in the 2024 edition of the Indian Premier League.

Ahead of the 2024 season, Shubman Gill was appointed as the captain after Hardik Pandya was traded to Mumbai Indians. After 7 losses and an abandoned match on 13 May 2024, Gujarat was eliminated from the 2024 Indian Premier League for the first time since their debut. They finished the League stage at the 8th place with 5 wins and 7 losses, garnering 12 points.

== Squad ==
- Source: ESPNcricinfo
- Players with international caps are listed in **bold**.
- * denotes a player who was unavailable for rest of the season.

Gujarat Titans squad for the 2024 Indian Premier League
No.	Name	Nat	Birth date	Batting style	Bowling style	Signed year	Salary	Notes
Captain
7	**Shubman Gill**	(India)	8 September 1999 (aged 24)	Right-handed	Right-arm off break	2022	₹8 crore (US$830,000)	
Batters
22	**Kane Williamson**	(New Zealand)	8 August 1990 (aged 33)	Right-handed	Right-arm off break	2023	₹2 crore (US$210,000)	Overseas
10	**David Miller**	(South Africa)	10 June 1989 (aged 34)	Left-handed	Right-arm off break	2022	₹3 crore (US$310,000)	Overseas
18	Abhinav Manohar	(India)	16 September 1994 (aged 29)	Right-handed	Right-arm leg break	2022	₹2.6 crore (US$270,000)	
23	**Sai Sudharsan**	(India)	15 October 2001 (aged 22)	Left-handed	Right-arm leg break	2022	₹20 lakh (US$21,000)	
Wicket-keepers
6	**Wriddhiman Saha**	(India)	24 October 1984 (aged 39)	Right-handed	—N/a	2022	₹1.9 crore (US$200,000)	
13	**Matthew Wade**	(Australia)	26 December 1987 (aged 36)	Left-handed	—N/a	2022	₹2.4 crore (US$250,000)	Overseas
—N/a	Robin Minz	(India)	13 September 2002 (aged 21)	Left-handed	—N/a	2024	₹3.6 crore (US$370,000)	Withdrawn (Note: BR Sharath replaced Robin Minz, after the latter withdrew due to Injury.)
41	BR Sharath	(India)	28 September 1996 (aged 27)	Right-handed	—N/a	2024	₹20 lakh (US$21,000)	Replacement
All-rounders
9	**Azmatullah Omarzai**	(Afghanistan)	24 March 2000 (aged 23)	Right-handed	Right-arm Fast medium	2024	₹50 lakh (US$52,000)	Overseas
46	Rahul Tewatia	(India)	20 May 1993 (aged 30)	Left-handed	Right-arm leg break	2022	₹9 crore (US$930,000)	
35	Shahrukh Khan	(India)	27 May 1995 (aged 28)	Right-handed	Right-arm Off break	2024	₹7.4 crore (US$770,000)	
59	**Vijay Shankar**	(India)	26 January 1991 (aged 33)	Right-handed	Right-arm medium	2022	₹1.4 crore (US$150,000)	
Pace bowlers
11	**Mohammed Shami**	(India)	3 September 1990 (aged 33)	Right-handed	Right-arm fast	2022	₹6.25 crore (US$650,000)	Withdrawn (Note: Sandeep Warrier replaced Mohammed Shami, after the latter withdrew due to Achilles tendon surgery.)
4	Darshan Nalkande	(India)	4 October 1998 (aged 25)	Right-handed	Right-arm fast-medium	2022	₹20 lakh (US$21,000)	
82	**Josh Little**	(Ireland)	1 November 1999 (aged 24)	Right-handed	Left-arm medium-fast	2023	₹4.4 crore (US$460,000)	Overseas
27	**Mohit Sharma**	(India)	18 September 1988 (aged 35)	Right-handed	Right-arm medium	2023	₹50 lakh (US$52,000)	
8	Kartik Tyagi	(India)	8 November 2000 (aged 23)	Right-handed	Right-arm Fast Medium	2024	₹60 lakh (US$62,000)	
37	**Umesh Yadav**	(India)	25 October 1987 (aged 36)	Right-handed	Right-arm Fast	2024	₹5.80 crore (US$600,000)	
—N/a	Sushant Mishra	(India)	23 December 2000 (aged 23)	Left-handed	Left-arm Fast medium	2024	₹2.20 crore (US$230,000)	Withdrawn (Note: Gurnoor Brar replaced Sushant Mishra, after the latter withdrew due to Injury.)
45	**Spencer Johnson**	(Australia)	16 December 1995 (aged 28)	Left-handed	Left-arm medium-fast	2024	₹10.0 crore (US$1.0 million)	Overseas
25	**Sandeep Warrier**	(India)	4 April 1991 (aged 32)	Right-handed	Right-arm medium	2024	₹50 lakh (US$52,000)	Replacement
—N/a	Gurnoor Brar	(India)	25 May 2000 (aged 23)	Right-handed	Right-arm Fast	2024	₹20 lakh (US$21,000)	Replacement
Spin bowlers
19	**Rashid Khan**	(Afghanistan)	20 September 1998 (aged 25)	Right-handed	Right-arm leg break	2022	₹15 crore (US$1.6 million)	Overseas
60	**Ravisrinivasan Sai Kishore**	(India)	6 November 1996 (aged 27)	Left-handed	Left-arm orthodox	2022	₹3 crore (US$310,000)	
16	**Jayant Yadav**	(India)	20 January 1990 (aged 34)	Right-handed	Right-arm off-break	2022	₹1.7 crore (US$180,000)	
3	Manav Suthar	(India)	3 August 2002 (aged 21)	Left-handed	Left-arm orthodox	2024	₹20 lakh (US$21,000)	
99	**Noor Ahmad**	(Afghanistan)	3 January 2005 (aged 19)	Right-handed	Left-arm unorthodox	2022	₹30 lakh (US$31,000)	Overseas

== Administration and support staff ==
Position	Name
CEO	Arvinder Singh
Team manager	Satyajit Parab
Head coach	Ashish Nehra
Batting coach	Gary Kirsten
Bowling coach	Aashish Kapoor
Fielding coach	Narender Negi

== Sponsors ==
- Kit manufacturer: EM
- Main shirt sponsor: Dream11
- Back shirt sponsor: BKT
- Chest branding: Capri Loans

== League stage ==
=== Points table ===
Pos	Grp	Team	Pld	W	L	NR	Pts	NRR	Qualification
1	A	Kolkata Knight Riders (C)	14	9	3	2	20	1.428	Advanced to Qualifier 1
2	B	Sunrisers Hyderabad (R)	14	8	5	1	17	0.414	Advanced to Qualifier 1
3	A	Rajasthan Royals (3rd)	14	8	5	1	17	0.273	Advanced to Eliminator
4	B	Royal Challengers Bengaluru (4th)	14	7	7	0	14	0.459	Advanced to Eliminator
5	B	Chennai Super Kings	14	7	7	0	14	0.392	Eliminated
6	A	Delhi Capitals	14	7	7	0	14	−0.377	Eliminated
7	A	Lucknow Super Giants	14	7	7	0	14	−0.667	Eliminated
8	B	Gujarat Titans	14	5	7	2	12	−1.063	Eliminated
9	B	Punjab Kings	14	5	9	0	10	−0.353	Eliminated
10	A	Mumbai Indians	14	4	10	0	8	−0.318	Eliminated

Source: ESPNcricinfo
(C) Champions; (R) Runners-up

=== League progression ===
League progression
Team	Group matches														Playoffs		
Team	1	2	3	4	5	6	7	8	9	10	11	12	13	14	Q1/E	Q2	F
Gujarat Titans	2	2	4	4	4	6	6	8	8	8	8	10	11	12			

Win	Loss	No result

- Note: The total points at the end of each group match are listed.
- Note: Click on the points (group matches) or W/L (playoffs) to see the match summary.

=== Fixtures and results ===
Match 5
24 March 2024
19:30 (N)
Scorecard

(H) Gujarat Titans; 168/6 (20 overs)	v	Mumbai Indians; 162/9 (20 overs)
Sai Sudharsan 45 (39); Jasprit Bumrah 3/14 (4 overs)		Dewald Brevis 46 (38); Spencer Johnson 2/25 (2 overs)

Gujarat Titans won by 6 runs
Narendra Modi Stadium, Ahmedabad
Umpires: Vineet Kulkarni (Ind) and Virender Sharma (Ind)
Player of the match: Sai Sudharsan (Gujarat Titans)

- Mumbai Indians won the toss and elected to field.

Match 7
26 March 2024
19:30 (N)
Scorecard

(H) Chennai Super Kings; 206/6 (20 overs)	v	Gujarat Titans; 143/8 (20 overs)
Shivam Dube 51 (23); Rashid Khan 2/49 (4 overs)		Sai Sudharsan 37 (31); Tushar Deshpande 2/21 (4 overs)

Chennai Super Kings won by 63 runs
M. A. Chidambaram Stadium, Chennai
Umpires: Tapan Sharma (Ind) and Alex Wharf (Eng)
Player of the match: Shivam Dube (Chennai Super Kings)

- Gujarat Titans won the toss and elected to field.

Match 12
31 March 2024
15:30 (D/N)
Scorecard

Sunrisers Hyderabad; 162/8 (20 overs)	v	Gujarat Titans (H); 168/3 (19.1 overs)
Abdul Samad 29 (14); Mohit Sharma 3/25 (4 overs)		Sai Sudharsan 45 (36); Shahbaz Ahmed 1/20 (2 overs)

Gujarat Titans won by 7 wickets
Narendra Modi Stadium, Ahmedabad
Umpires: Saiyed Khalid (Ind) and Virender Sharma (Ind)
Player of the match: Mohit Sharma (Gujarat Titans)

- Sunrisers Hyderabad won the toss and elected to bat.

Match 17
4 April 2024
19:30 (N)
Scorecard

(H) Gujarat Titans; 199/4 (20 overs)	v	Punjab Kings; 200/7 (19.5 overs)
Shubman Gill 89* (48); Kagiso Rabada 2/44 (4 overs)		Shashank Singh 61* (29); Noor Ahmad 2/32 (4 overs)

Punjab Kings won by 3 wickets
Narendra Modi Stadium, Ahmedabad
Umpires: Vineet Kulkarni (Ind) and Nitin Menon (Ind)
Player of the match: Shashank Singh (Punjab Kings)

- Punjab Kings won the toss and elected to field.

Match 21
7 April 2024
19:30 (N)
Scorecard

(H) Lucknow Super Giants; 163/5 (20 overs)	v	Gujarat Titans; 130 (18.5 overs)
Marcus Stoinis 58 (43); Darshan Nalkande 2/21 (2 overs)		Sai Sudharsan 31 (23); Yash Thakur 5/30 (3.5 overs)

Lucknow Super Giants won by 33 runs
BRSABV Ekana Cricket Stadium, Lucknow
Umpires: Nand Kishore (Ind) and Virender Sharma (Ind)
Player of the match: Yash Thakur (Lucknow Super Giants)

- Lucknow Super Giants won the toss and elected to bat.

Match 24
10 April 2024
19:30 (N)
Scorecard

(H) Rajasthan Royals; 196/3 (20 overs)	v	Gujarat Titans; 199/7 (20 overs)
Riyan Parag 76 (48); Rashid Khan 1/18 (4 overs)		Shubman Gill 72 (44); Kuldeep Sen 3/41 (4 overs)

Gujarat Titans won by 3 wickets
Sawai Mansingh Stadium, Jaipur
Umpires: Kumar Dharmasena (SL) and Vinod Seshan (Ind)
Player of the match: Rashid Khan (Gujarat Titans)

- Gujarat Titans won the toss and elected to field.

Match 32
17 April 2024
19:30 (N)
Scorecard

(H) Gujarat Titans; 89 (17.3 overs)	v	Delhi Capitals; 92/4 (8.5 overs)
Rashid Khan 31 (24); Mukesh Kumar 3/14 (2.3 overs)		Jake Fraser-McGurk 20 (10); Sandeep Warrier 2/40 (3 overs)

Delhi Capitals won by 6 wickets
Narendra Modi Stadium, Ahmedabad
Umpires: Virender Sharma (Ind) and Nikhil Patwardhan (Ind)
Player of the match: Rishabh Pant (Delhi Capitals)

- Delhi Capitals won the toss and elected to field.
- Gujarat Titans recorded their lowest innings total in IPL history.

Match 37
21 April 2024
19:30 (N)
Scorecard

(H) Punjab Kings; 142 (20 overs)	v	Gujarat Titans; 146/7 (19.1 overs)
Prabhsimran Singh 35 (21); R. Sai Kishore 4/33 (4 overs)		Rahul Tewatia 36* (18); Harshal Patel 3/15 (3 overs)

Gujarat Titans won by 3 wickets
Maharaja Yadavindra Singh International Cricket Stadium, Mullanpur
Umpires: Nand Kishore (Ind) and Vineet Kulkarni (Ind)
Player of the match: R. Sai Kishore (Gujarat Titans)

- Punjab Kings won the toss and elected to bat.

Match 40
24 April 2024
19:30 (N)
Scorecard

(H) Delhi Capitals; 224/4 (20 overs)	v	Gujarat Titans; 220/8 (20 overs)
Rishabh Pant 88* (43); Sandeep Warrier 3/15 (3 overs)		Sai Sudharsan 65 (39); Rasikh Salam 3/44 (4 overs)

Delhi Capitals won by 4 runs
Arun Jaitley Stadium, Delhi
Umpires: K. N. Ananthapadmanabhan (Ind) and Ulhas Gandhe (Ind)
Player of the match: Rishabh Pant (Delhi Capitals)

- Gujarat Titans won the toss and elected to field.

Match 45
28 April 2024
15:30 (D/N)
Scorecard

(H) Gujarat Titans; 200/3 (20 overs)	v	Royal Challengers Bengaluru; 206/1 (16 overs)
Sai Sudharsan 84* (49); Swapnil Singh 1/23 (3 overs)		Will Jacks 100* (41); R. Sai Kishore 1/30 (3 overs)

Royal Challengers Bengaluru won by 9 wickets
Narendra Modi Stadium, Ahmedabad
Umpires: Nitin Menon (Ind) and Virender Sharma (Ind)
Player of the match: Will Jacks (Royal Challengers Bengaluru)

- Royal Challengers Bengaluru won the toss and elected to field.

Match 52
4 May 2024
19:30 (N)
Scorecard

Gujarat Titans; 147 (19.3 overs)	v	Royal Challengers Bengaluru (H); 152/6 (13.4 overs)
Shahrukh Khan 37 (24); Yash Dayal 2/21 (4 overs)		Faf du Plessis 64 (23); Josh Little 4/45 (4 overs)

Royal Challengers Bengaluru won by 4 wickets
M. Chinnaswamy Stadium, Bengaluru
Umpires: Vinod Seshan (Ind) and Akshay Totre (Ind)
Player of the match: Mohammed Siraj (Royal Challengers Bengaluru)

- Royal Challengers Bengaluru won the toss and elected to field.

Match 59
10 May 2024
19:30 (N)
Scorecard

(H) Gujarat Titans; 231/3 (20 overs)	v	Chennai Super Kings; 196/8 (20 overs)
Shubman Gill 104 (55); Tushar Deshpande 2/33 (4 overs)		Daryl Mitchell 63 (34); Mohit Sharma 3/31 (4 overs)

Gujarat Titans won by 35 runs
Narendra Modi Stadium, Ahmedabad
Umpires: K. N. Ananthapadmanabhan (Ind) and Nikhil Patwardhan (Ind)
Player of the match: Shubman Gill (Gujarat Titans)

- Chennai Super Kings won the toss and elected to field.

Match 63
13 May 2024
19:30 (N)
Scorecard

(H) Gujarat Titans	v	Kolkata Knight Riders

Match abandoned
Narendra Modi Stadium, Ahmedabad
Umpires: Nikhil Patwardhan (Ind) and Navdeep Singh (Ind)

- No toss.
- No play was possible due to rain.
- Kolkata Knight Riders advanced to Qualifier 1 while Gujarat Titans were eliminated from the playoffs as a result of this match.

Match 66
16 May 2024
19:30 (N)
Scorecard

(H) Sunrisers Hyderabad	v	Gujarat Titans

Match abandoned
Rajiv Gandhi International Cricket Stadium, Hyderabad
Umpires: Nand Kishore (Ind) and Virender Sharma (Ind)

- No toss.
- No play was possible due to rain.
- Sunrisers Hyderabad qualified for the playoffs while Delhi Capitals and Lucknow Super Giants were eliminated from the playoffs as a result of this match.

== Statistics ==
=== Most runs ===
Runs	Player	Inns	HS	Ave	SR	100s/50s	4s	6s
527	(India) Sai Sudharsan	12	103	47.90	141.28	1/2	48	16
426	(India) Shubman Gill	12	104	38.72	147.40	1/2	37	15
210	(South Africa) David Miller	9	55	35.00	151.07	0/1	20	8
188	(India) Rahul Tewatia	9	36*	26.86	145.73	0/0	24	5
136	(India) Wriddhiman Saha	9	39	15.11	118.26	0/0	18	3
Source: ESPNcricinfo

=== Most wickets ===
Wkts.	Player	Inns	Ov	Runs	BBI	Ave	Econ	SR	4W	5W
13	(India) Mohit Sharma	11	39.0	425	3/25	32.69	10.89	18.00	0	0
10	(Afghanistan) Rashid Khan	12	43.4	367	2/38	36.70	8.40	26.20	0	0
8	(India) Umesh Yadav	7	21.0	210	2/22	26.25	10.00	15.75	0	0
8	(Afghanistan) Noor Ahmad	10	34.5	290	2/20	36.25	8.32	26.12	0	0
7	(India) Sai Kishore	5	15.0	137	4/33	19.57	9.13	12.85	1	0
Source: ESPNcricinfo
