= 2026 Gujarat Titans season =

Indian Premier League cricket team

Gujarat Titans
2026 season
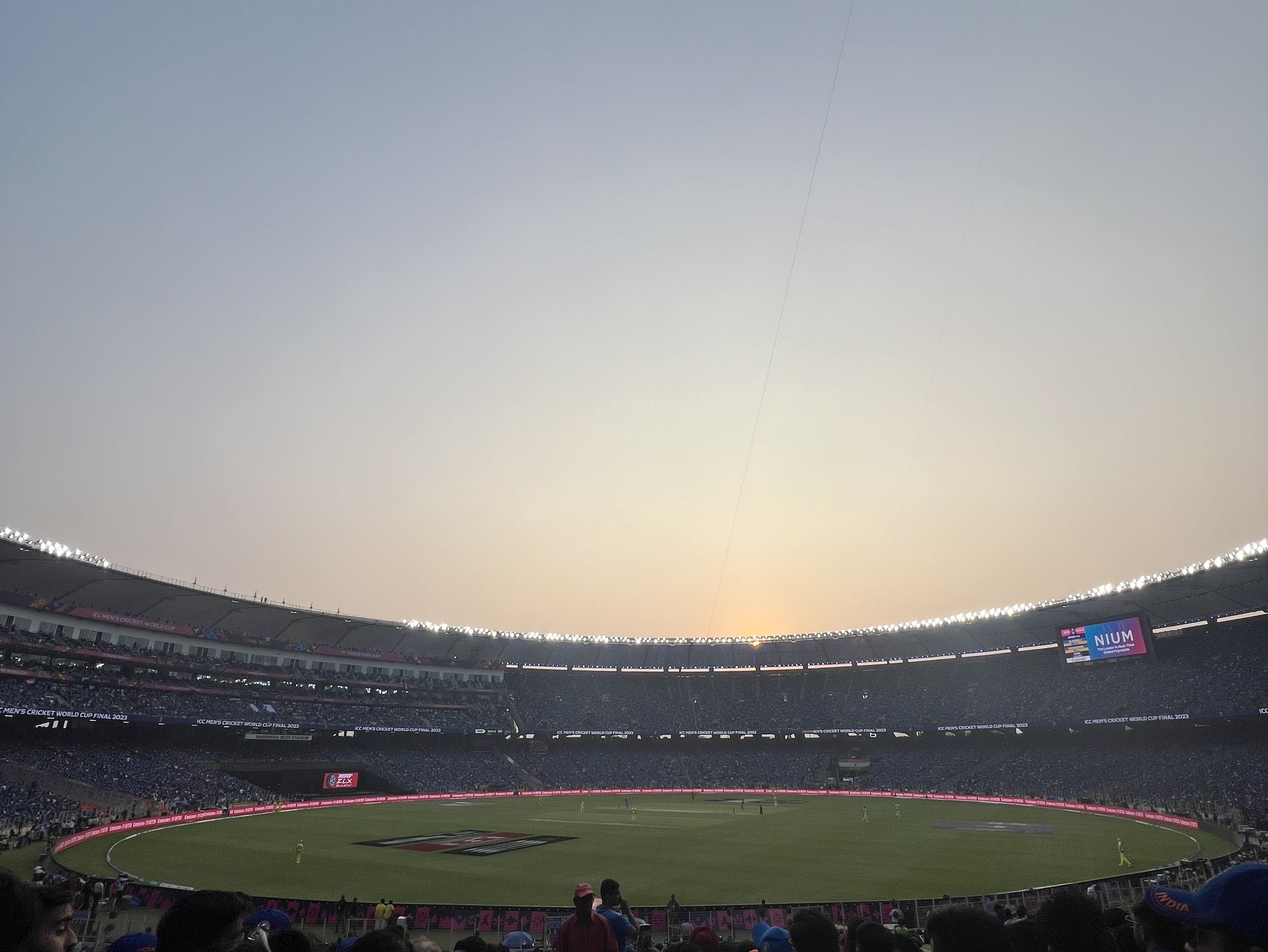
- Narendra Modi Stadium, home ground of Gujarat Titans
- Coach: Ashish Nehra
- Captain: Shubman Gill
- Ground(s): Narendra Modi Stadium, Ahmedabad
- League stage: 2nd place
- Qualifier 1: Lost to Royal Challengers Bengaluru
- Qualifier 2: Won against Rajasthan Royals
- Final: Lost to Royal Challengers Bengaluru
- Most runs: Shubman Gill (732)
- Most wickets: Kagiso Rabada (29)
- Most catches: Shubman Gill (12)
- Most wicket-keeping dismissals: Jos Buttler (26)

The 2026 season was Gujarat Titans' fifth appearance in the Indian Premier League (IPL). They were one of the ten cricket teams that competed in the 2026 IPL. The team was captained by Shubman Gill and coached by Ashish Nehra.

Gujarat Titans finished in second place in the league stage, and advanced to Qualifier 1 in the playoffs. The team lost Qualifier 1 to Royal Challengers Bengaluru but won Qualifier 2 against Rajasthan Royals to qualify for Gujarat's third final. However, they lost the final again to Royal Challengers Bengaluru. Captain Gill scored the most runs (732) while Kagiso Rabada took the most wickets (29) for Gujarat in the 2026 season; Rabada's 29 wickets were also the most by any bowler in the tournament.

== Pre-season ==
The 2026 Indian Premier League was the 19th edition of the Indian Premier League (IPL), a professional Twenty20 (T20) cricket league held in India, organised by the Board of Control for Cricket in India (BCCI). Gujarat Titans had previously won the title once in their debut season of 2022. The team finished in third place in the previous season. The tournament featured ten teams competing in 74 matches from 28 March to 31 May 2026. Gujarat played all their home matches at Narendra Modi Stadium. Gujarat's matches against Chennai Super Kings (match 37 and match 66) were switched venues due to the 2026 Gujarat local elections.

=== Player retention ===
Franchises were allowed to retain any number of players from their squad, including traded players while excluding players signed as temporary replacements. Franchises were required to submit their retention lists before 15 November 2025. Gujarat retained twenty players, including captain Shubman Gill. Gujarat also traded Sherfane Rutherford to Mumbai Indians.

Retained players
| Domestic | | Overseas |
|---|---|---|
| Gurnoor Brar; Shubman Gill; Arshad Khan; Shahrukh Khan; Sai Kishore; Prasidh Krishna; Kumar Kushagra; Anuj Rawat | Ishant Sharma; Nishant Sindhu; Mohammed Siraj; Sai Sudharsan; Washington Sundar; Manav Suthar; Rahul Tewatia; Jayant Yadav | Jos Buttler; Rashid Khan; Kagiso Rabada; Glenn Phillips |

Released players
| Batters | Wicket-keepers | All-rounders | Bowlers |
|---|---|---|---|
| Sherfane Rutherford (Note: Gujarat Titans traded Sherfane Rutherford to Mumbai Indians.) | Kusal Mendis | Karim Janat; Mahipal Lomror; Dasun Shanaka | Gerald Coetzee; Kulwant Khejroliya |

=== Auction ===
The season's auction took place on 16 December 2025 in Abu Dhabi, United Arab Emirates. The auction purse for each franchise was set at ₹125 crore (US$13 million), with franchises being deducted an amount from the purse for every retained player. Gujarat had a purse remaining of ₹12.9 crore (US$1.3 million). Gujarat bought five players in the auction, including three capped overseas players.

Auctioned players
| Domestic | | Overseas | |
| Capped | Uncapped | Capped | Uncapped |
|---|---|---|---|
| —N/a | Prithvi Raj; Ashok Sharma | Tom Banton; Jason Holder; Luke Wood | —N/a |

== Squad ==
- Players with international caps as of start of 2026 IPL are listed in **bold**.
- Ages are as of 28 March 2026.
- Withdrawn players are indicated by a dagger symbol (†) and placed at the bottom of the table.

Gujarat Titans squad for the 2026 Indian Premier League
| S/N | Name | Nationality | Birth date | Batting style | Bowling style | Salary | Notes |
|---|---|---|---|---|---|---|---|
| 3 | Manav Suthar | India | 3 August 2002 (aged 23) | Left-handed | Left-arm orthodox | ₹30 lakh (US$31,000) | |
| 4 | Kulwant Khejroliya | India | 13 March 1992 (aged 34) | Left-handed | Left-arm medium-fast | ₹30 lakh (US$31,000) | Replacement (Note: Kulwant Khejroliya replaced Prithvi Raj, after the latter withdrew due to injury.) |
| 5 | **Washington Sundar** | India | 5 October 1999 (aged 26) | Left-handed | Right-arm off break | ₹3.2 crore (US$330,000) | |
| 7 | **Shubman Gill** | India | 8 September 1999 (aged 26) | Right-handed | Right-arm off break | ₹16.5 crore (US$1.7 million) | Captain |
| 16 | **Jayant Yadav** | India | 22 January 1990 (aged 36) | Right-handed | Right-arm off break | ₹75 lakh (US$78,000) | |
| 18 | **Jason Holder** | West Indies | 5 November 1991 (aged 34) | Right-handed | Right-arm medium-fast | ₹7 crore (US$730,000) | Overseas |
| 19 | **Rashid Khan** | Afghanistan | 20 September 1998 (aged 27) | Right-handed | Right-arm leg break | ₹18 crore (US$1.9 million) | Overseas |
| 20 | Arshad Khan | India | 20 December 1997 (aged 28) | Left-handed | Left-arm medium-fast | ₹1.3 crore (US$130,000) | |
| 23 | **Sai Sudharsan** | India | 15 October 2001 (aged 24) | Left-handed | Right-arm leg break | ₹8.5 crore (US$880,000) | |
| 25 | **Kagiso Rabada** | South Africa | 25 May 1995 (aged 30) | Left-handed | Right-arm medium-fast | ₹10.75 crore (US$1.1 million) | Overseas |
| 29 | **Ishant Sharma** | India | 2 September 1988 (aged 37) | Right-handed | Right-arm medium-fast | ₹75 lakh (US$78,000) | |
| 35 | Shahrukh Khan | India | 27 May 1995 (aged 30) | Right-handed | Right-arm off break | ₹4 crore (US$420,000) | |
| 43 | **Prasidh Krishna** | India | 19 February 1996 (aged 30) | Right-handed | Right-arm medium-fast | ₹9.5 crore (US$990,000) | |
| 46 | Rahul Tewatia | India | 20 May 1993 (aged 32) | Left-handed | Right-arm leg break | ₹4 crore (US$420,000) | |
| 60 | **Sai Kishore** | India | 6 November 1996 (aged 29) | Left-handed | Left-arm orthodox | ₹2 crore (US$210,000) | |
| 63 | **Jos Buttler** | England | 8 September 1990 (aged 35) | Right-handed | —N/a | ₹15.75 crore (US$1.6 million) | Overseas |
| 73 | **Mohammed Siraj** | India | 13 March 1994 (aged 32) | Right-handed | Right-arm medium-fast | ₹12.25 crore (US$1.3 million) | |
| —N/a | Gurnoor Brar | India | 25 May 2000 (aged 25) | Left-handed | Right-arm medium-fast | ₹1.3 crore (US$130,000) | |
| —N/a | **Connor Esterhuizen** | South Africa | 31 May 2001 (aged 24) | Right-handed | —N/a | ₹75 lakh (US$78,000) | Overseas; replacement (Note: Connor Esterhuizen replaced Tom Banton, after the latter withdrew due to finger injury.) |
| —N/a | Kumar Kushagra | India | 23 October 2004 (aged 21) | Right-handed | —N/a | ₹65 lakh (US$67,000) | |
| —N/a | **Glenn Phillips** | New Zealand | 6 December 1996 (aged 29) | Right-handed | Right-arm off break | ₹2 crore (US$210,000) | Overseas |
| —N/a | Anuj Rawat | India | 17 October 1999 (aged 26) | Left-handed | —N/a | ₹30 lakh (US$31,000) | |
| —N/a | Ashok Sharma | India | 17 June 2002 (aged 23) | Right-handed | Right-arm medium-fast | ₹90 lakh (US$93,000) | |
| —N/a | Nishant Sindhu | India | 9 April 2004 (aged 21) | Left-handed | Left-arm orthodox | ₹30 lakh (US$31,000) | |
| —N/a | **Luke Wood** | England | 2 August 1995 (aged 30) | Left-handed | Left-arm fast-medium | ₹75 lakh (US$78,000) | Overseas |
| —N/a | **Tom Banton** † | England | 11 November 1998 (aged 27) | Right-handed | Right-arm off break | ₹2 crore (US$210,000) | Overseas; withdrawn |
| —N/a | Prithvi Raj † | India | 20 February 1998 (aged 28) | Left-handed | Left-arm medium | ₹30 lakh (US$31,000) | Withdrawn |

== Support staff ==
Aashish Kapoor and Vijay Dahiya replaced Matthew Wade as assistant coaches while Matthew Hayden joined as batting coach.

| Position | Name |
|---|---|
| Head coach | Ashish Nehra |
| Assistant coach | Aashish Kapoor; Narender Negi; Parthiv Patel; Vijay Dahiya |
| Batting coach | Matthew Hayden |

- Source: News18

== League stage ==
Gujarat Titans began their season with two losses against Punjab Kings and Rajasthan Royals. They won their next three matches against Delhi Capitals, Lucknow Super Giants and Kolkata Knight Riders. They lost the next two matches to Mumbai and Royal Challengers Bengaluru. However, won the next five matches against Chennai, Bengaluru, Punjab, Rajasthan and Sunrisers Hyderabad. They lost the match to Kolkata but won against Chennai to finish the league stage in second place with nine wins from 14 matches, and advanced to Qualifier 1 in the playoffs.

=== Points table ===
League stage standings
| Pos | Grp | Team | Pld | W | L | NR | Pts | NRR | Qualification |
|---|---|---|---|---|---|---|---|---|---|
| 1 | A | Royal Challengers Bengaluru (C) | 14 | 9 | 5 | 0 | 18 | 0.783 | Advanced to Qualifier 1 |
| 2 | B | Gujarat Titans (R) | 14 | 9 | 5 | 0 | 18 | 0.695 | Advanced to Qualifier 1 |
| 3 | B | Sunrisers Hyderabad (4th) | 14 | 9 | 5 | 0 | 18 | 0.524 | Advanced to Eliminator |
| 4 | A | Rajasthan Royals (3rd) | 14 | 8 | 6 | 0 | 16 | 0.189 | Advanced to Eliminator |
| 5 | A | Punjab Kings | 14 | 7 | 6 | 1 | 15 | 0.309 | Eliminated |
| 6 | B | Delhi Capitals | 14 | 7 | 7 | 0 | 14 | −0.651 | Eliminated |
| 7 | A | Kolkata Knight Riders | 14 | 6 | 7 | 1 | 13 | −0.147 | Eliminated |
| 8 | A | Chennai Super Kings | 14 | 6 | 8 | 0 | 12 | −0.345 | Eliminated |
| 9 | B | Mumbai Indians | 14 | 4 | 10 | 0 | 8 | −0.584 | Eliminated |
| 10 | B | Lucknow Super Giants | 14 | 4 | 10 | 0 | 8 | −0.740 | Eliminated |

Source: ESPNcricinfo
Rules for classification: 1) Points; 2) Wins; 3) Net run rate; 4) Wickets taken per fair deliveries; 5) drawing lots
(C) Champions; (R) Runners-up

=== League progression ===
League progression
| Team | Group matches | | | | | | | | | | | | | | Playoffs | | |
| Team | 1 | 2 | 3 | 4 | 5 | 6 | 7 | 8 | 9 | 10 | 11 | 12 | 13 | 14 | Q1/E | Q2 | F |
|---|---|---|---|---|---|---|---|---|---|---|---|---|---|---|---|---|---|
| Gujarat Titans | 0 | 0 | 2 | 4 | 6 | 6 | 6 | 8 | 10 | 12 | 14 | 16 | 16 | 18 | L | W | L |

| Win | Loss | No result |

- Note: The total points at the end of each group match are listed.
- Note: Click on the points (group matches) or W/L (playoffs) to see the match summary.

=== Fixtures ===
Match 4
31 March 2026
19:30 (N)
Scorecard

| Gujarat Titans; 162/6 (20 overs) | v | Punjab Kings (H); 165/7 (19.1 overs) |
| Shubman Gill 39 (27); Vijaykumar Vyshak 3/34 (4 overs) | | Cooper Connolly 72* (44); Prasidh Krishna 3/29 (4 overs) |

Punjab Kings won by 3 wickets
Maharaja Yadavindra Singh Stadium, Mullanpur
Umpires: Abhijit Bhattacharya (Ind) and Akshay Totre (Ind)
Player of the match: Cooper Connolly (Punjab Kings)

- Punjab Kings won the toss and elected to field.
- Cooper Connolly (Punjab Kings) and Ashok Sharma (Gujarat Titans) both made their IPL debuts.

Match 9
4 April 2026
19:30 (N)
Scorecard

| Rajasthan Royals; 210/6 (20 overs) | v | Gujarat Titans (H); 204/8 (20 overs) |
| Dhruv Jurel 75 (42); Kagiso Rabada 2/42 (4 overs) | | Sai Sudharsan 73 (44); Ravi Bishnoi 4/41 (4 overs) |

Rajasthan Royals won by 6 runs
Narendra Modi Stadium, Ahmedabad
Umpires: Ulhas Gandhe (Ind) and Rohan Pandit (Ind)
Player of the match: Ravi Bishnoi (Rajasthan Royals)

- Rajasthan Royals won the toss and elected to bat.

Match 14
8 April 2026
19:30 (N)
Scorecard

| Gujarat Titans; 210/4 (20 overs) | v | Delhi Capitals (H); 209/8 (20 overs) |
| Shubman Gill 70 (45); Mukesh Kumar 2/55 (4 overs) | | KL Rahul 92 (52); Rashid Khan 3/17 (4 overs) |

Gujarat Titans won by 1 run
Arun Jaitley Stadium, Delhi
Umpires: Nitin Menon (Ind) and Anish Sahasrabudhe (Ind)
Player of the match: Rashid Khan (Gujarat Titans)

- Delhi Capitals won the toss and elected to field.
- Jos Buttler (Gujarat Titans) became the first non-West Indies' batter to score 600 sixes in T20s.

Match 19
12 April 2026
15:30 (D/N)
Scorecard

| Lucknow Super Giants (H); 164/8 (20 overs) | v | Gujarat Titans; 165/3 (18.4 overs) |
| Aiden Markram 30 (21); Prasidh Krishna 4/28 (4 overs) | | Jos Buttler 60 (37); Prince Yadav 1/31 (4 overs); Digvesh Rathi 1/31 (4 overs) |

Gujarat Titans won by 7 wickets
Ekana Cricket Stadium, Lucknow
Umpires: K. N. Ananthapadmanabhan (Ind) and Abhijit Bhattacharya (Ind)
Player of the match: Prasidh Krishna (Gujarat Titans)

- Gujarat Titans won the toss and elected to field.

Match 25
17 April 2026
19:30 (N)
Scorecard

| Kolkata Knight Riders; 180 (20 overs) | v | Gujarat Titans (H); 181/5 (19.4 overs) |
| Cameron Green 79 (55); Kagiso Rabada 3/29 (4 overs) | | Shubman Gill 86 (50); Varun Chakravarthy 2/34 (4 overs) |

Gujarat Titans won by 5 wickets
Narendra Modi Stadium, Ahmedabad
Umpires: Rohan Pandit (Ind) and Ulhas Gandhe (Ind)
Player of the match: Shubman Gill (Gujarat Titans)

- Kolkata Knight Riders won the toss and elected to bat.
- Jos Buttler (Gujarat Titans) became the fourth player to take 300 catches in T20s.

Match 30
20 April 2026
19:30 (N)
Scorecard

| Mumbai Indians; 199/5 (20 overs) | v | Gujarat Titans (H); 100 (15.5 overs) |
| Tilak Varma 101* (45); Kagiso Rabada 3/33 (4 overs) | | Washington Sundar 26 (17); Ashwani Kumar 4/24 (4 overs) |

Mumbai Indians won by 99 runs
Narendra Modi Stadium, Ahmedabad
Umpires: Abhijit Bhattacharya (Ind) and K. N. Ananthapadmanabhan (Ind)
Player of the match: Tilak Varma (Mumbai Indians)

- Gujarat Titans won the toss and elected to field.
- Krish Bhagat and Danish Malewar (Mumbai Indians) both made their T20 debuts.
- Hardik Pandya became the seventh player to score 2,000 runs for Mumbai Indians in IPL.
- Tilak Varma (Mumbai Indians) scored his maiden century in IPL.

Match 34
24 April 2026
19:30 (N)
Scorecard

| Gujarat Titans; 205/3 (20 overs) | v | Royal Challengers Bengaluru (H); 206/5 (18.5 overs) |
| Sai Sudharsan 100 (58); Bhuvneshwar Kumar 1/31 (4 overs) | | Virat Kohli 81 (44); Rashid Khan 2/49 (4 overs) |

Royal Challengers Bengaluru won by 5 wickets
M. Chinnaswamy Stadium, Bengaluru
Umpires: Jayaraman Madanagopal (Ind) and Amit Rana (Ind)
Player of the match: Virat Kohli (Royal Challengers Bengaluru)

- Royal Challengers Bengaluru won the toss and elected to field.

Match 37
26 April 2026
15:30 (D/N)
Scorecard

| Chennai Super Kings (H); 158/7 (20 overs) | v | Gujarat Titans; 162/2 (16.4 overs) |
| Ruturaj Gaikwad 74* (60); Kagiso Rabada 3/25 (4 overs) | | Sai Sudharsan 87 (46); Noor Ahmad 1/29 (4 overs) |

Gujarat Titans won by 8 wickets
M. A. Chidambaram Stadium, Chennai
Umpires: K. N. Ananthapadmanabhan (Ind) and Adrian Holdstock (SA)
Player of the match: Kagiso Rabada (Gujarat Titans)

- Gujarat Titans won the toss and elected to field.
- This match was initially scheduled at Narendra Modi Stadium in Ahmedabad, but was swapped venues with match 66 due to the 2026 Gujarat local elections.

Match 42
30 April 2026
19:30 (N)
Scorecard

| Royal Challengers Bengaluru; 155 (19.2 overs) | v | Gujarat Titans (H); 158/6 (15.5 overs) |
| Devdutt Padikkal 40 (24); Arshad Khan 3/22 (3.2 overs) | | Shubman Gill 43 (18); Bhuvneshwar Kumar 3/28 (4 overs) |

Gujarat Titans won by 4 wickets
Narendra Modi Stadium, Ahmedabad
Umpires: K. N. Ananthapadmanabhan (Ind) and Adrian Holdstock (SA)
Player of the match: Jason Holder (Gujarat Titans)

- Gujarat Titans won the toss and elected to field.

Match 46
3 May 2026
19:30 (N)
Scorecard

| Punjab Kings; 163/9 (20 overs) | v | Gujarat Titans (H); 167/6 (19.5 overs) |
| Suryansh Shedge 57 (29); Jason Holder 4/24 (4 overs) | | Sai Sudharsan 57 (41); Arshdeep Singh 2/24 (4 overs) |

Gujarat Titans won by 4 wickets
Narendra Modi Stadium, Ahmedabad
Umpires: K. N. Ananthapadmanabhan (Ind) and Parashar Joshi (Ind)
Player of the match: Jason Holder (Gujarat Titans)

- Gujarat Titans won the toss and elected to field.
- Nishant Sindhu (Gujarat Titans) made his IPL debut.

Match 52
9 May 2026
19:30 (N)
Scorecard

| Gujarat Titans; 229/4 (20 overs) | v | Rajasthan Royals (H); 152 (16.3 overs) |
| Shubman Gill 84 (44); Brijesh Sharma 2/47 (4 overs) | | Ravindra Jadeja 38 (25); Rashid Khan 4/33 (4 overs) |

Gujarat Titans won by 77 runs
Sawai Mansingh Stadium, Jaipur
Umpires: Saiyed Khalid (Ind) and Virender Sharma (Ind)
Player of the match: Rashid Khan (Gujarat Titans)

- Rajasthan Royals won the toss and elected to field.

Match 56
12 May 2026
19:30 (N)
Scorecard

| Gujarat Titans (H); 168/5 (20 overs) | v | Sunrisers Hyderabad; 86 (14.5 overs) |
| Sai Sudharsan 61 (44); Praful Hinge 2/17 (4 overs) | | Pat Cummins 19 (9); Jason Holder 3/20 (4 overs) |

Gujarat Titans won by 82 runs
Narendra Modi Stadium, Ahmedabad
Umpires: Saiyed Khalid (Ind) and Virender Sharma (Ind)
Player of the match: Kagiso Rabada (Gujarat Titans)

- Sunrisers Hyderabad won the toss and elected to field.

Match 60
16 May 2026
19:30 (N)
Scorecard

| Kolkata Knight Riders (H); 247/2 (20 overs) | v | Gujarat Titans; 218/4 (20 overs) |
| Finn Allen 93 (35); Sai Kishore 1/38 (3 overs) | | Shubman Gill 85 (49); Sunil Narine 2/29 (4 overs) |

Kolkata Knight Riders won by 29 runs
Eden Gardens, Kolkata
Umpires: Virender Sharma (Ind) and Kannur Swaroopanand (Ind)
Player of the match: Sunil Narine (Kolkata Knight Riders)

- Gujarat Titans won the toss and elected to field.
- Kolkata Knight Riders became the second IPL team to play in 100 matches at a home venue.
- Sunil Narine (Kolkata Knight Riders) became the first overseas player to play in 200 IPL matches.
- Cameron Green (Kolkata Knight Riders) scored his 1,000th run in IPL.

Match 66
21 May 2026
19:30 (N)
Scorecard

| Gujarat Titans (H); 229/4 (20 overs) | v | Chennai Super Kings; 140 (13.4 overs) |
| Sai Sudharsan 84 (53); Mukesh Choudhary 1/36 (4 overs) | | Shivam Dube 47 (17); Rashid Khan 3/18 (2 overs) |

Gujarat Titans won by 89 runs
Narendra Modi Stadium, Ahmedabad
Umpires: Kaushik Gandhi (Ind) and Nitin Menon (Ind)
Player of the match: Mohammed Siraj (Gujarat Titans)

- Chennai Super Kings won the toss and elected to field.
- This match was initially scheduled at M. A. Chidambaram Stadium in Chennai, but was swapped venues with match 37 due to the 2026 Gujarat local elections.
- Chennai Super Kings were eliminated as a result of this match.

== Playoffs ==
=== Bracket ===
Qualifier 1
26 May 2026 – Dharamshala
1 | Royal Challengers Bengaluru | 254/5 (20 overs)
2 | Gujarat Titans | 162 (19.3 overs)
Eliminator
27 May 2026 – Mullanpur
3 | Sunrisers Hyderabad | 196 (19.2 overs)
4 | Rajasthan Royals | 243/8 (20 overs)

Qualifier 2
29 May 2026 – Mullanpur
Q1L | Gujarat Titans | 219/3 (18.4 overs)
EW | Rajasthan Royals | 214/6 (20 overs)

Final
31 May 2026 – Ahmedabad
Q1W | Royal Challengers Bengaluru | 161/5 (18 overs)
Q2W | Gujarat Titans | 155/8 (20 overs)

- Sources: ESPNcricinfo

=== Qualifier 1 ===
Qualifier 1
26 May 2026
19:30 (N)
Scorecard

| Royal Challengers Bengaluru; 254/5 (20 overs) | v | Gujarat Titans; 162 (19.3 overs) |
| Rajat Patidar 93* (33); Jason Holder 2/39 (4 overs) | | Rahul Tewatia 68 (43); Jacob Duffy 3/39 (4 overs) |

Royal Challengers Bengaluru won by 92 runs
HPCA Cricket Stadium, Dharamshala
Umpires: Jayaraman Madanagopal (Ind) and Virender Sharma (Ind)
Player of the match: Rajat Patidar (Royal Challengers Bengaluru)

- Gujarat Titans won the toss and elected to field.
- Virat Kohli (Royal Challengers Bengaluru) became the first player to score over 600 runs in four consecutive IPL seasons.
- Royal Challengers Bengaluru's 254 was the highest innings total in IPL playoffs.
- Royal Challengers Bengaluru qualified for their second consecutive and overall fifth IPL final.

=== Qualifier 2 ===
Qualifier 2
29 May 2026
19:30 (N)
Scorecard

| Rajasthan Royals; 214/6 (20 overs) | v | Gujarat Titans; 219/3 (18.4 overs) |
| Vaibhav Sooryavanshi 96 (47); Jason Holder 2/27 (4 overs) | | Shubman Gill 104 (53); Nandre Burger 1/35 (4 overs) |

Gujarat Titans won by 7 wickets
Maharaja Yadavindra Singh International Cricket Stadium, Mullanpur
Umpires: Sam Nogajski (Aus) and Rohan Pandit (Ind)
Player of the match: Shubman Gill (Gujarat Titans)

- Rajasthan Royals won the toss and elected to bat.
- Vaibhav Sooryavanshi (Rajasthan Royals) became the fastest Indian player to score 1,000 runs in IPL, in terms of innings (23).
- Gujarat Titans qualified for their third IPL final.

=== Final ===
Final
31 May 2026
19:30 (N)
Scorecard

| Gujarat Titans; 155/8 (20 overs) | v | Royal Challengers Bengaluru; 161/5 (18 overs) |
| Washington Sundar 50* (37); Rasikh Salam 3/27 (4 overs) | | Virat Kohli 75* (42); Rashid Khan 2/25 (4 overs) |

Royal Challengers Bengaluru won by 5 wickets
Narendra Modi Stadium, Ahmedabad
Umpires: K. N. Ananthapadmanabhan (Ind) and Nitin Menon (Ind)
Player of the match: Virat Kohli (Royal Challengers Bengaluru)

- Royal Challengers Bengaluru won the toss and elected to field.
- Royal Challengers Bengaluru won their second IPL title after 2025. They also became the third team to win two consecutive IPL finals; and the first team to win the IPL and the Women's Premier League in the same year.

== Statistics ==
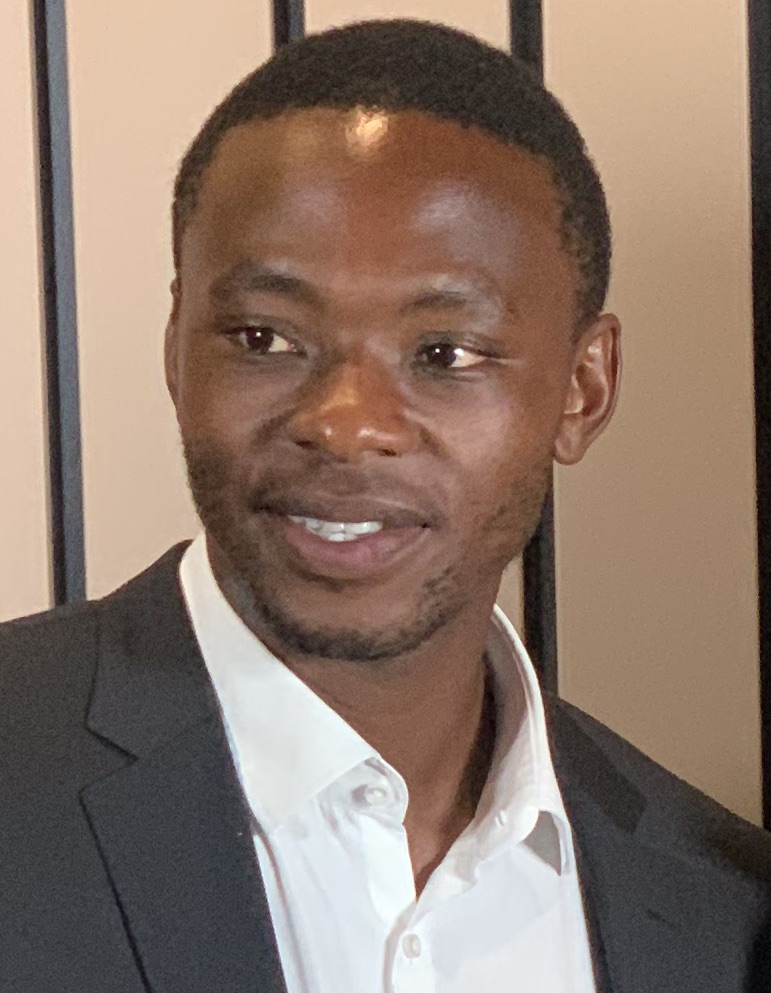
Kagiso Rabada (pictured in 2021) took the most wickets (29) in the 2026 Indian Premier League.

At the IPL end of season awards, Sai Sudharsan was awarded for scoring most fours in the season while Kagiso Rabada was awarded for most wickets and Mohammed Siraj was awarded for most dot balls.

Most runs
| Runs | Player |
|---|---|
| 732 | Shubman Gill |
| 722 | Sai Sudharsan |
| 526 | Jos Buttler |
| 377 | Washington Sundar |
| 190 | Rahul Tewatia |

Most wickets
| Wickets | Player |
|---|---|
| 29 | Kagiso Rabada |
| 21 | Rashid Khan |
| 19 | Mohammed Siraj |
| 17 | Jason Holder |
| 16 | Prasidh Krishna |
