= List of Gujarat Titans cricketers =

The Gujarat Titans (abbreviated as "GT") is a franchise cricket team based in Ahmedabad, Gujarat.The team competes in the Indian Premier League (IPL) and was established in 2022. It is currently captained by Shubman Gill and coached by Ashish Nehra. They won their maiden title in the 2022 season under the captaincy of Hardik Pandya.

== Players ==
Key

- § – Member of the current squad
- † – Captain
- ‡ – Wicket-keeper
- First – Year of Twenty20 debut for the Capitals
- Last – Year of latest Twenty20 match for the Capitals
- * – Batsman remained not out

The Capitals capped cricketers
General						Batting								Bowling				Fielding	
Name	Nationality (Note: The information in the nationality column is according to ESPNcricinfo. This information may not necessarily reflect the player's birthplace or citizenship.)	First	Last	Mat	Inn	NO	Runs	HS	100	50 (Note: A century made is not listed as an additional half century.)	Avg	SR	Balls (Note: This does not include illegal deliveries like no-balls and wides.)	Wkt	BBI (Note: The BBI has not been provided for those bowlers who have not taken any wicket while playing for RR.)	ER (Note: Average runs concede by bowlers while playing for RR.)	Ave	Ca	St
Varun Aaron	India	2022	2022	2	0	0	–	–	0	0	–	–	30	2	2/45	10.40	26.00	0	0
Lockie Ferguson	New Zealand	2022	2022	13	3	1	5	5	0	0	2.50	125.00	286	12	4/28	8.96	35.58	2	0
Pradeep Sangwan	India	2022	2022	3	1	0	2	2	0	0	2.00	40.00	54	3	2/19	7.22	21.67	1	0
Hardik Pandya †	India	2022	2023	31	30	8	833	87*	0	6	37.86	133.49	333	11	3/17	8.11	40.91	12	0
Alzarri Joseph	West Indies	2022	2023	16	5	4	12	7*	0	0	12.00	63.16	324	14	2/27	9.06	34.93	3	0
Mohammed Shami	India	2022	2023	33	2	0	5	5	0	0	2.50	83.33	756	48	4/11	8.02	21.04	8	0
Yash Dayal	India	2022	2023	14	1	0	0	0	0	0	0.00	0.00	276	13	3/40	10.02	35.46	2	0
David Miller	South Africa	2022	2024	41	38	17	950	94*	0	3	45.24	145.26	0	–	–	–	–	22	0
Wriddhiman Saha ‡	India	2022	2024	37	37	2	824	81	0	5	23.54	124.66	0	–	–	–	–	25	6
Matthew Wade ‡	Australia	2022	2024	12	11	0	161	35	0	0	14.64	111.81	0	–	–	–	–	8	1
Abhinav Manohar	India	2022	2024	19	15	1	231	43	0	0	16.50	132.76	0	–	–	–	–	9	0
Vijay Shankar	India	2022	2024	25	21	4	403	63*	0	3	23.71	136.61	9	0	0/1	10.00	–	8	0
Darshan Nalkande	India	2022	2024	6	2	0	12	12	0	0	6.00	100.00	84	6	2/21	10.57	24.57	2	0
Sai Sudharsan §	India	2022	2026	52	52	4	2294	108*	3	17	47.79	147.81	0	–	–	–	–	14	0
Shubman Gill § †	India	2022	2026	71	71	7	2916	129	4	20	45.56	151.09	0	–	–	–	–	31	0
Rashid Khan § †	Afghanistan	2022	2026	72	37	17	398	79*	0	1	19.90	171.55	1628	81	4/24	8.09	27.11	32	0
Rahul Tewatia §	India	2022	2026	71	53	24	687	43*	0	0	23.69	148.70	49	0	0/7	11.14	–	25	0
Sai Kishore §	India	2022	2026	26	5	1	18	13	0	0	4.50	112.50	447	32	4/33	8.85	20.59	9	0
Noor Ahmad	Afghanistan	2023	2024	23	7	3	13	7*	0	0	3.25	72.22	492	24	3/37	8.04	27.46	7	0
Kane Williamson	New Zealand	2023	2024	3	2	0	27	26	0	0	13.50	100.00	0	–	–	–	–	1	0
Josh Little	Ireland	2023	2024	11	0	0	–	–	0	0	–	–	228	11	4/45	8.92	30.82	5	0
Mohit Sharma	India	2023	2024	26	4	2	2	2	0	0	1.00	12.50	499	40	5/10	9.45	19.65	10	0
Dasun Shanaka	Sri Lanka	2023	2023	3	3	1	26	17	0	0	13.00	100.00	0	–	–	–	–	2	0
Jayant Yadav §	India	2023	2023	1	0	0	–	–	0	0	–	–	24	0	0/26	6.50	–	1	0
BR Sharath ‡	India	2024	2024	1	1	0	2	2	0	0	2.00	40.00	0	–	–	–	–	1	0
Azmatullah Omarzai	Afghanistan	2024	2024	7	4	0	42	17	0	0	10.50	127.27	126	4	2/27	8.86	46.50	0	0
Spencer Johnson	Australia	2024	2024	5	3	3	6	5*	0	0	–	85.71	96	4	2/25	9.44	37.75	2	0
Kartik Tyagi	India	2024	2024	1	0	0	–	–	0	0	–	–	24	0	0/51	12.75	–	0	0
Sandeep Warrier	India	2024	2024	5	0	0	–	–	0	0	–	–	66	6	3/15	10.82	19.83	0	0
Umesh Yadav	India	2024	2024	7	2	1	12	10*	0	0	12.00	80.00	126	8	2/22	10.00	26.25	1	0
Manav Suthar §	India	2024	2026	5	1	0	1	1	0	0	1.00	50.00	48	2	1/19	11.75	47.00	2	0
Shahrukh Khan §	India	2024	2026	31	23	6	349	58	0	2	20.53	167.79	18	1	1/13	9.33	28.00	14	0
Jos Buttler § ‡	England	2025	2026	26	25	5	893	97*	0	7	44.65	156.67	0	–	–	–	–	27	3
Sherfane Rutherford	West Indies	2025	2025	13	11	2	291	46	0	0	32.33	157.30	0	–	–	–	–	1	0
Kusal Mendis ‡	Sri Lanka	2025	2025	1	1	0	20	20	0	0	20.00	200.00	0	–	–	–	–	1	0
Washington Sundar §	India	2025	2026	18	17	5	429	55	0	2	35.75	156.57	108	3	1/27	9.56	57.33	9	0
Arshad Khan §	India	2025	2026	14	6	4	31	20	0	0	15.50	129.17	188	11	3/22	9.93	28.27	5	0
Kagiso Rabada §	South Africa	2025	2026	16	4	2	44	23*	0	0	22.00	115.79	360	23	3/25	9.72	25.35	3	0
Gerald Coetzee	South Africa	2025	2025	4	2	0	17	12	0	0	8.50	154.55	72	2	1/10	10.92	65.50	2	0
Karim Janat	Afghanistan	2025	2025	1	0	0	–	–	0	0	–	–	6	0	0/30	30.00	–	0	0
Kulwant Khejroliya §	India	2025	2025	1	0	0	–	–	0	0	–	–	18	1	1/29	9.67	29.00	1	0
Mohammed Siraj §	India	2025	2026	27	2	1	3	3*	0	0	3.00	42.86	606	29	4/17	8.80	30.66	9	0
Ishant Sharma §	India	2025	2025	7	0	0	–	–	0	0	–	–	110	4	1/18	11.18	51.25	2	0
Prasidh Krishna §	India	2025	2026	23	0	0	–	–	0	0	–	–	528	39	4/28	8.86	20.00	6	0
Glenn Phillips §	New Zealand	2026	2026	6	5	1	67	25	0	0	16.75	124.07	0	–	–	–	–	8	0
Ashok Sharma §	India	2026	2026	6	2	2	1	1*	0	0	–	25.00	126	6	2/32	10.86	38.00	1	0
Kumar Kushagra § ‡	India	2026	2026	1	1	0	18	18	0	0	18.00	128.57	0	–	–	–	–	1	0
Jason Holder §	West Indies	2026	2026	6	5	2	58	23*	0	0	19.33	131.82	134	13	4/24	6.36	10.92	6	0
Nishant Sindhu §	India	2026	2026	3	2	0	37	22	0	0	18.50	148.00	0	–	–	–	–	3	0
