= 2025 Gujarat Titans season =

Indian Premier League cricket team

Gujarat Titans
2025 season
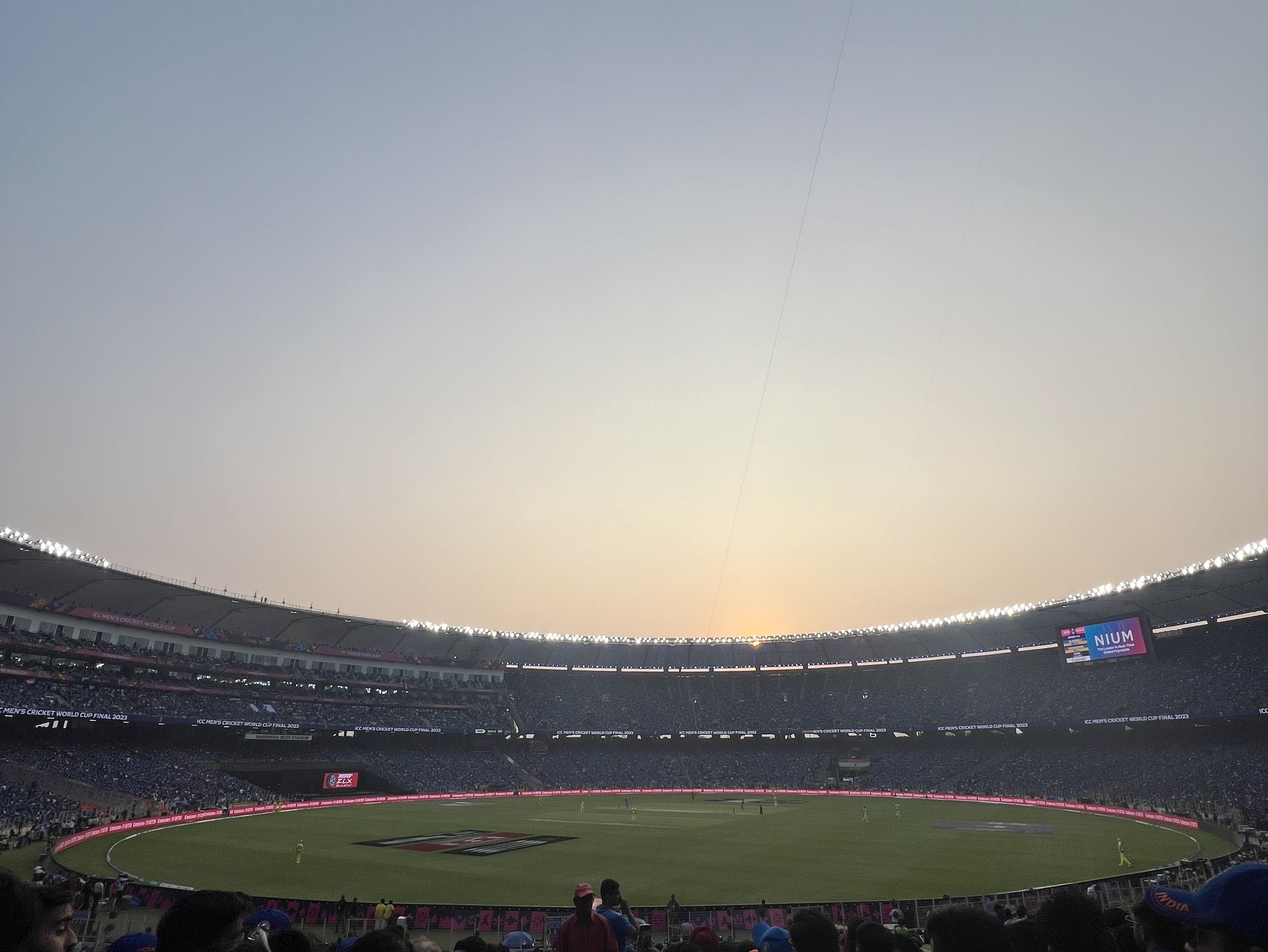
- Narendra Modi Stadium, home ground of Gujarat Titans
- Coach: Ashish Nehra
- Captain: Shubman Gill
- Ground(s): Narendra Modi Stadium, Ahmedabad
- League stage: 3rd place
- Eliminator: Lost to Mumbai Indians
- Most runs: Sai Sudharsan (759)
- Most wickets: Prasidh Krishna (25)
- Most catches: Shubman Gill (8)
- Most wicket-keeping dismissals: Jos Buttler (10)

The 2025 season was the 4th season for the Indian Premier League (IPL) cricket franchise Gujarat Titans. They were one of the ten teams that competed in the 2025 IPL. The team was captained by Shubman Gill and coached by Ashish Nehra.

Gujarat Titans finished in third place in the league stage, and advanced to Eliminator in the playoffs. However, they lost to Mumbai Indians in Eliminator. Sai Sudharsan scored the most runs (759) while Prasidh Krishna took the most wickets (25) for Gujarat in the 2025 season; which were also the most in the 2025 IPL by any team.

== Pre-season ==
The 2025 Indian Premier League was the 18th edition of the Indian Premier League (IPL), a professional Twenty20 (T20) cricket league, organised by the Board of Control for Cricket in India (BCCI). Gujarat Titans had previously won the title once in their debut season of 2022. The team finished in eighth place in the previous season. The tournament featured ten teams competing in 74 matches from 22 March to 3 June 2025. Gujarat played all their home matches at Narendra Modi Stadium.

=== Player retention ===
Franchises were allowed to retain a maximum of six players from their squad, including a maximum of five recent international players. Franchises were required to submit their retention lists before 31 October 2024. Gujarat retained five players, including captain Shubman Gill.

Retained players
No.	Player	Salary
1	Rashid Khan	₹18 crore (US$1.9 million)
2	Shubman Gill	₹16.5 crore (US$1.7 million)
3	Sai Sudharsan	₹8.5 crore (US$880,000)
4	Rahul Tewatia	₹4 crore (US$420,000)
5	Shahrukh Khan	₹4 crore (US$420,000)

Released players
Batters	Wicket-keepers	All-rounders	Fast bowlers	Spin bowlers
Kane Williamson; David Miller; Abhinav Manohar	Wriddhiman Saha (Note: Wriddhiman Saha announced his retirement from IPL in November 2024.); Matthew Wade; Robin Minz; BR Sharath	Azmatullah Omarzai; Vijay Shankar	Mohammed Shami; Darshan Nalkande; Josh Little; Mohit Sharma; Kartik Tyagi; Umesh Yadav; Sushant Mishra; Spencer Johnson; Sandeep Warrier; Gurnoor Brar	Sai Kishore; Jayant Yadav; Manav Suthar; Noor Ahmad

=== Auction ===
The season's auction took place on 24 and 25 November 2024 in Jeddah, Saudi Arabia. The auction purse for each franchise was set at ₹120 crore (US$12 million), with the franchises being deducted an amount from the purse for each retained player. Gujarat had a purse remaining of ₹69 crore (US$7.2 million). Franchises that did not retain six players, were allowed Right-to-Match (RTM) cards at the auction for each player not retained. Gujarat had one card available. Gujarat bought twenty players in the auction, including twelve capped players and six overseas players. Gujarat used their RTM card to buy back Sai Kishore for ₹2 crore (US$210,000).

== Squad ==
- Players with international caps as of start of 2025 IPL are listed in **bold**.
- Ages are as of 22 March 2025.
- Withdrawn players are indicated by a dagger symbol (†) and placed at the bottom of the table.

Gujarat Titans squad for the 2025 Indian Premier League
S/N	Name	Nationality	Birth date	Batting style	Bowling style	Salary	Notes
3	Manav Suthar	India	3 August 2002 (aged 22)	Left-handed	Left-arm orthodox	₹30 lakh (US$31,000)	
4	Kulwant Khejroliya	India	13 March 1992 (aged 33)	Left-handed	Left-arm medium-fast	₹30 lakh (US$31,000)	
5	**Washington Sundar**	India	5 October 1999 (aged 25)	Left-handed	Right-arm off break	₹3.2 crore (US$330,000)	
7	**Shubman Gill**	India	8 September 1999 (aged 25)	Right-handed	Right-arm off break	₹16.5 crore (US$1.7 million)	Captain
16	**Jayant Yadav**	India	22 January 1990 (aged 35)	Right-handed	Right-arm off break	₹75 lakh (US$78,000)	
19	**Rashid Khan**	Afghanistan	20 September 1998 (aged 26)	Right-handed	Right-arm leg break	₹18 crore (US$1.9 million)	Overseas
20	Arshad Khan	India	20 December 1997 (aged 27)	Left-handed	Left-arm medium-fast	₹1.3 crore (US$130,000)	
23	**Sai Sudharsan**	India	15 October 2001 (aged 23)	Left-handed	Right-arm leg break	₹8.5 crore (US$880,000)	
25	**Kagiso Rabada**	South Africa	25 May 1995 (aged 29)	Left-handed	Right-arm medium-fast	₹10.75 crore (US$1.1 million)	Overseas
29	**Ishant Sharma**	India	2 September 1988 (aged 36)	Right-handed	Right-arm medium-fast	₹75 lakh (US$78,000)	
35	Shahrukh Khan	India	27 May 1995 (aged 29)	Right-handed	Right-arm off break	₹4 crore (US$420,000)	
43	**Prasidh Krishna**	India	19 February 1996 (aged 29)	Right-handed	Right-arm medium-fast	₹9.5 crore (US$990,000)	
46	Rahul Tewatia	India	20 May 1993 (aged 31)	Left-handed	Right-arm leg break	₹4 crore (US$420,000)	
60	**Sai Kishore**	India	6 November 1996 (aged 28)	Left-handed	Left-arm orthodox	₹2 crore (US$210,000)	
62	**Gerald Coetzee**	South Africa	2 October 2000 (aged 24)	Right-handed	Right-arm medium-fast	₹2.4 crore (US$250,000)	Overseas
68	**Sherfane Rutherford**	West Indies	15 August 1998 (aged 26)	Left-handed	Right-arm medium-fast	₹1.7 crore (US$180,000)	Overseas
73	**Mohammed Siraj**	India	13 March 1994 (aged 31)	Right-handed	Right-arm medium-fast	₹12.25 crore (US$1.3 million)	
—N/a	Gurnoor Brar	India	25 May 2000 (aged 24)	Left-handed	Right-arm medium-fast	₹1.3 crore (US$130,000)	
—N/a	**Karim Janat**	Afghanistan	11 August 1998 (aged 26)	Right-handed	Right-arm medium-fast	₹75 lakh (US$78,000)	Overseas
—N/a	Kumar Kushagra	India	23 October 2004 (aged 20)	Right-handed	—N/a	₹65 lakh (US$67,000)	
—N/a	Mahipal Lomror	India	16 November 1999 (aged 25)	Left-handed	Left-arm orthodox	₹1.7 crore (US$180,000)	
—N/a	**Kusal Mendis**	Sri Lanka	2 February 1995 (aged 30)	Right-handed	Right-arm leg break	₹75 lakh (US$78,000)	Overseas; temporary (Note: Gujarat Titans signed Kusal Mendis as temporary replacement, following the IPL's suspension and rescheduling.) replacement (Note: Dasun Shanaka replaced Glenn Phillips, after the latter withdrew due to groin injury.)
—N/a	Anuj Rawat	India	17 October 1999 (aged 25)	Left-handed	—N/a	₹30 lakh (US$31,000)	
—N/a	**Dasun Shanaka**	Sri Lanka	9 September 1991 (aged 33)	Right-handed	Right-arm medium	₹75 lakh (US$78,000)	Overseas; replacement
—N/a	Nishant Sindhu	India	9 April 2004 (aged 20)	Left-handed	Left-arm orthodox	₹30 lakh (US$31,000)	
63	**Jos Buttler** †	England	8 September 1990 (aged 34)	Right-handed	—N/a	₹15.75 crore (US$1.6 million)	Overseas; withdrawn (Note: Kusal Mendis replaced Jos Buttler, after the latter withdrew due to national duty.)
—N/a	**Glenn Phillips** †	New Zealand	6 December 1996 (aged 28)	Right-handed	Right-arm off break	₹2 crore (US$210,000)	Overseas; withdrawn

== Support staff ==
Matthew Wade replaced Mithun Manhas as assistant coach while, Parthiv Patel replaced Gary Kirsten as batting coach.

Position	Name
Head coach	Ashish Nehra
Assistant coach	Matthew Wade
Batting coach and mentor	Parthiv Patel

== League stage ==
Gujarat Titans began their season with a loss against Punjab Kings. They won their next four matches against Mumbai Indians, Royal Challengers Bengaluru, Sunrisers Hyderabad and Rajasthan Royals; lost to Lucknow Super Giants; won against Delhi Capitals and Kolkata Knight Riders; lost to Rajasthan; and won their next three matches against Hyderabad, Mumbai and Delhi. Gujarat lost their last two matches of the stage to Lucknow and Chennai Super Kings to finish the league stage in third place with nine wins from 14 matches, and advanced to Eliminator in the playoffs.

=== Points table ===
League stage standings
Pos	Grp	Team	Pld	W	L	NR	Pts	NRR	Qualification
1	A	Punjab Kings	14	9	4	1	19	0.372	Advance to Qualifier 1
2	A	Royal Challengers Bengaluru	14	9	4	1	19	0.301	Advance to Qualifier 1
3	B	Gujarat Titans	14	9	5	0	18	0.254	Advance to Eliminator
4	B	Mumbai Indians	14	8	6	0	16	1.142	Advance to Eliminator
5	B	Delhi Capitals	14	7	6	1	15	−0.011	Eliminated
6	B	Sunrisers Hyderabad	14	6	7	1	13	−0.241	Eliminated
7	B	Lucknow Super Giants	14	6	8	0	12	−0.376	Eliminated
8	A	Kolkata Knight Riders	14	5	7	2	12	−0.305	Eliminated
9	A	Rajasthan Royals	14	4	10	0	8	−0.549	Eliminated
10	A	Chennai Super Kings	14	4	10	0	8	−0.647	Eliminated

Source: ESPNcricinfo

=== League progression ===
League progression
Team	Group matches														Playoffs		
Team	1	2	3	4	5	6	7	8	9	10	11	12	13	14	Q1/E	Q2	F
Gujarat Titans	0	2	4	6	8	8	10	12	12	14	16	18	18	18	L		

Win	Loss	No result

- Note: The total points at the end of each group match are listed.
- Note: Click on the points (group matches) or W/L (playoffs) to see the match summary.

=== Fixtures ===
Match 5
25 March 2025
19:30 (N)
Scorecard

Punjab Kings; 243/5 (20 overs)	v	Gujarat Titans (H); 232/5 (20 overs)
Shreyas Iyer 97* (42); Sai Kishore 3/30 (4 overs)		Sai Sudharsan 74 (41); Arshdeep Singh 2/36 (4 overs)

Punjab Kings won by 11 runs
Narendra Modi Stadium, Ahmedabad
Umpires: Abhijeet Bengeri (Ind) and Vinod Seshan (Ind)
Player of the match: Shreyas Iyer (Punjab Kings)

- Gujarat Titans won the toss and elected to field.
- Priyansh Arya and Suryansh Shedge (Punjab Kings) made their IPL debuts.

Match 9
29 March 2025
19:30 (N)
Scorecard

Gujarat Titans (H); 196/8 (20 overs)	v	Mumbai Indians; 160/6 (20 overs)
Sai Sudharsan 63 (41); Hardik Pandya 2/29 (4 overs)		Suryakumar Yadav 48 (28); Prasidh Krishna 2/18 (4 overs)

Gujarat Titans won by 36 runs
Narendra Modi Stadium, Ahmedabad
Umpires: Abhijeet Bengeri (Ind) and Vinod Seshan (Ind)
Player of the match: Prasidh Krishna (Gujarat Titans)

- Mumbai Indians won the toss and elected to field.

Match 14
2 April 2025
19:30 (N)
Scorecard

Royal Challengers Bengaluru (H); 169/8 (20 overs)	v	Gujarat Titans; 170/2 (17.5 overs)
Liam Livingstone 54 (40); Mohammed Siraj 3/19 (4 overs)		Jos Buttler 73* (39); Bhuvneshwar Kumar 1/23 (4 overs)

Gujarat Titans won by 8 wickets
M. Chinnaswamy Stadium, Bengaluru
Umpires: Abhijit Bhattacharya (Ind) and Ulhas Gandhe (Ind)
Player of the match: Mohammed Siraj (Gujarat Titans)

- Gujarat Titans won the toss and elected to field.

Match 19
6 April 2025
19:30 (N)
Scorecard

Sunrisers Hyderabad (H); 152/8 (20 overs)	v	Gujarat Titans; 153/3 (16.4 overs)
Nitish Kumar Reddy 31 (34); Mohammed Siraj 4/17 (4 overs)		Shubman Gill 61* (43); Mohammed Shami 2/28 (4 overs)

Gujarat Titans won by 7 wickets
Rajiv Gandhi International Cricket Stadium, Hyderabad
Umpires: K. N. Ananthapadmanabhan (Ind) and Saidharshan Kumar (Ind)
Player of the match: Mohammed Siraj (Gujarat Titans)

- Gujarat Titans won the toss and elected to field.

Match 23
9 April 2025
19:30 (N)
Scorecard

Gujarat Titans (H); 217/6 (20 overs)	v	Rajasthan Royals; 159 (19.2 overs)
Sai Sudharsan 82 (53); Tushar Deshpande 2/53 (4 overs)		Shimron Hetmyer 52 (32); Prasidh Krishna 3/24 (4 overs)

Gujarat Titans won by 58 runs
Narendra Modi Stadium, Ahmedabad
Umpires: Rohan Pandit (Ind) and Akshay Totre (Ind)
Player of the match: Sai Sudharsan (Gujarat Titans)

- Rajasthan Royals won the toss and elected to field.

Match 26
12 April 2025
15:30 (N)
Scorecard

Gujarat Titans; 180/6 (20 overs)	v	Lucknow Super Giants (H); 186/4 (19.3 overs)
Shubman Gill 60 (38); Shardul Thakur 2/34 (4 overs)		Nicholas Pooran 61 (34); Prasidh Krishna 2/26 (4 overs)

Lucknow Super Giants won by 6 wickets
Ekana Cricket Stadium, Lucknow
Umpires: Ulhas Gandhe (Ind) and Kannur Swaroopanand (Ind)
Player of the match: Aiden Markram (Lucknow Super Giants)

- Lucknow Super Giants won the toss and elected to field.

Match 35
19 April 2025
15:30 (D/N)
Scorecard

Delhi Capitals; 203/8 (20 overs)	v	Gujarat Titans (H); 204/3 (19.2 overs)
Axar Patel 39 (32); Prasidh Krishna 4/41 (4 overs)		Jos Buttler 97* (54); Kuldeep Yadav 1/30 (4 overs)

Gujarat Titans won by 7 wickets
Narendra Modi Stadium, Ahmedabad
Umpires: Keyur Kelkar (Ind) and Akshay Totre (Ind)
Player of the match: Jos Buttler (Gujarat Titans)

- Gujarat Titans won the toss and elected to field.

Match 39
21 April 2025
19:30 (N)
Scorecard

Gujarat Titans; 198/3 (20 overs)	v	Kolkata Knight Riders (H); 159/8 (20 overs)
Shubman Gill 90 (55); Andre Russell 1/13 (1 over)		Ajinkya Rahane 50 (36); Prasidh Krishna 2/25 (4 overs); Rashid Khan 2/25 (4 overs)

Gujarat Titans won by 39 runs
Eden Gardens, Kolkata
Umpires: Rohan Pandit (Ind) and Anish Sahasrabudhe (Ind)
Player of the match: Shubman Gill (Gujarat Titans)

- Kolkata Knight Riders won the toss and elected to field.

Match 47
28 April 2025
19:30 (N)
Scorecard

Gujarat Titans; 209/4 (20 overs)	v	Rajasthan Royals (H); 212/2 (15.5 overs)
Shubman Gill 84 (50); Maheesh Theekshana 2/35 (4 overs)		Vaibhav Sooryavanshi 101 (38); Rashid Khan 1/24 (4 overs)

Rajasthan Royals won by 8 wickets
Sawai Mansingh Stadium, Jaipur
Umpires: Michael Gough (Eng) and Virender Sharma (Ind)
Player of the match: Vaibhav Sooryavanshi (Rajasthan Royals)

- Rajasthan Royals won the toss and elected to field.
- Karim Janat (Gujarat Titans) made his IPL debut.
- Vaibhav Sooryavanshi (Rajasthan Royals) became the youngest player to score a century in IPL history.

Match 51
2 May 2025
19:30 (N)
Scorecard

Gujarat Titans (H); 224/6 (20 overs)	v	Sunrisers Hyderabad; 186/6 (20 overs)
Shubman Gill 76 (38); Jaydev Unadkat 3/35 (4 overs)		Abhishek Sharma 74 (41); Prasidh Krishna 2/19 (4 overs)

Gujarat Titans won by 38 runs
Narendra Modi Stadium, Ahmedabad
Umpires: Virender Sharma (Ind) and Kannur Swaroopanand (Ind)
Player of the match: Prasidh Krishna (Gujarat Titans)

- Sunrisers Hyderabad won the toss and elected to field.

Match 56
6 May 2025
19:30 (N)
Scorecard

Mumbai Indians (H); 155/8 (20 overs)	v	Gujarat Titans; 147/7 (19 overs)
Will Jacks 53 (35); Sai Kishore 2/34 (4 overs)		Shubman Gill 43 (46); Jasprit Bumrah 2/19 (4 overs)

Gujarat Titans won by 3 wickets (DLS method)
Wankhede Stadium, Mumbai
Umpires: Kaushik Gandhi (Ind) and Saidharshan Kumar (Ind)
Player of the match: Shubman Gill (Gujarat Titans)

- Gujarat Titans won the toss and elected to field.
- Gujarat Titans were set a revised target of 147 runs from 19 overs due to rain.

Match 60
18 May 2025
19:30 (N)
Scorecard

Delhi Capitals (H); 199/3 (20 overs)	v	Gujarat Titans; 205/0 (19 overs)
KL Rahul 112* (65); Arshad Khan 1/7 (2 overs)		Sai Sudharsan 108* (61)

Gujarat Titans won by 10 wickets
Arun Jaitley Stadium, Delhi
Umpires: Adrian Holdstock (SA) and Keyur Kelkar (Ind)
Player of the match: Sai Sudharsan (Gujarat Titans)

- Gujarat Titans won the toss and elected to field.
- This match was originally scheduled for 11 May at the same venue, before being rescheduled.
- Gujarat Titans, Royal Challengers Bengaluru and Punjab Kings qualified for the playoffs as a result of this match.

Match 64
22 May 2025
19:30 (N)
Scorecard

Lucknow Super Giants; 235/2 (20 overs)	v	Gujarat Titans (H); 202/9 (20 overs)
Mitchell Marsh 117 (64); Sai Kishore 1/34 (3 overs)		Shahrukh Khan 57 (29); Will O'Rourke 3/27 (4 overs)

Lucknow Super Giants won by 33 runs
Narendra Modi Stadium, Ahmedabad
Umpires: K. N. Ananthapadmanabhan (Ind) and Mohit Krishnadas (Ind)
Player of the match: Mitchell Marsh (Lucknow Super Giants)

- Gujarat Titans won the toss and elected to field.
- This match was originally scheduled for 14 May at the same venue, before being rescheduled.

Match 67
25 May 2025
15:30 (D/N)
Scorecard

Chennai Super Kings; 230/5 (20 overs)	v	Gujarat Titans (H); 147 (18.3 overs)
Dewald Brevis 57 (23); Prasidh Krishna 2/22 (4 overs)		Sai Sudharsan 41 (28); Anshul Kamboj 3/13 (2.3 overs)

Chennai Super Kings won by 83 runs
Narendra Modi Stadium, Ahmedabad
Umpires: K. N. Ananthapadmanabhan (Ind) and Kaushik Gandhi (Ind)
Player of the match: Dewald Brevis (Chennai Super Kings)

- Chennai Super Kings won the toss and elected to bat.
- This match was originally scheduled for 18 May at the same venue, before being rescheduled.

== Playoffs ==
=== Bracket ===
Qualifier 1
29 May 2025 – Mullanpur
1	Punjab Kings	101 (14.1 overs)
2	Royal Challengers Bengaluru	106/2 (10 overs)
Eliminator
30 May 2025 – Mullanpur
3	Gujarat Titans	208/6 (20 overs)
4	Mumbai Indians	228/5 (20 overs)

Qualifier 2
1 June 2025 – Ahmedabad
Q1L	Punjab Kings	207/5 (19 overs)
EW	Mumbai Indians	203/6 (20 overs)

Final
3 June 2025 – Ahmedabad
Q1W	Royal Challengers Bengaluru	190/9 (20 overs)
Q2W	Punjab Kings	184/7 (20 overs)

=== Eliminator ===
Eliminator
30 May 2025
19:30 (N)
Scorecard

Mumbai Indians; 228/5 (20 overs)	v	Gujarat Titans; 208/6 (20 overs)
Rohit Sharma 81 (50); Sai Kishore 2/42 (4 overs)		Sai Sudharsan 80 (49); Trent Boult 2/56 (4 overs)

Mumbai Indians won by 20 runs
Maharaja Yadavindra Singh International Cricket Stadium, Mullanpur
Umpires: Ulhas Gandhe (Ind) and Rohan Pandit (Ind)
Player of the match: Rohit Sharma (Mumbai Indians)

- Mumbai Indians won the toss and elected to bat.
- This match was originally scheduled for 21 May at the Rajiv Gandhi Stadium, before being rescheduled.
- Kusal Mendis (Gujarat Titans) made his IPL debut.

== Statistics ==
At the IPL end of season awards, Sai Sudharsan was awarded for scoring most runs and most fours in the season and as the Fantasy player and the Emerging player of the season; while Prasidh Krishna was awarded for most wickets and Mohammed Siraj was awarded for most dot balls.

Most runs
Runs	Player
759	Sai Sudharsan
650	Shubman Gill
538	Jos Buttler
291	Sherfane Rutherford
179	Shahrukh Khan

Most wickets
Wickets	Player
25	Prasidh Krishna
19	Sai Kishore
16	Mohammed Siraj
9	Rashid Khan
6	Arshad Khan
