= 2022 Gujarat Titans season =

Indian Premier League cricket team season

Gujarat Titans
2022 season
- Coach: Ashish Nehra
- Captain: Hardik Pandya
- Ground(s): Narendra Modi Stadium, Motera, Ahmedabad
- 2022 Indian Premier League: Champions
- Most runs: Hardik Pandya (487)
- Most wickets: Mohammed Shami (20)

The 2022 season was the first season in the Indian Premier League for the Gujarat Titans franchise. They were one of ten teams to compete in the 2022 Indian Premier League. The team was coached by Ashish Nehra and captained by Hardik Pandya.

== Background ==
As a new franchise the team added three players ahead of the 2022 mega-auction.

Picked
Hardik Pandya, Rashid Khan, Shubman Gill
Acquired during the auction
Mohammed Shami, Jason Roy, Lockie Ferguson, Abhinav Sadarangani, Rahul Tewatia, Noor Ahmad, R Sai Kishore, Dominic Drakes, Jayant Yadav, Vijay Shankar, Darshan Nalkande, Yash Dayal, Alzarri Joseph, Pradeep Sangwan, David Miller, Wriddhiman Saha, Matthew Wade, Gurkeerat Singh, Varun Aaron, B Sai Sudharshan

== Squad ==
- Players with international caps are listed in **bold**.
- Squad strength: 23 (15 - Indian, 8 - overseas)

No.	Name	Nationality	Birth date	Batting style	Bowling style	Year signed	Salary	Notes
Captain
33	**Hardik Pandya**	India	11 October 1993 (aged 28)	Right-Handed	Right-arm medium-fast	2022	₹15 crore (US$1.8 million)	Captain
Batters
07	**Shubman Gill**	India	8 September 1999 (aged 22)	Right-handed	Right-arm off break	2022	₹8 crore (US$950,000)	Vice Captain
10	**David Miller**	South Africa	10 June 1989 (aged 32)	Left-handed	Right-arm off break	2022	₹3 crore (US$350,000)	Overseas
17	**Gurkeerat Singh**	India	29 June 1990 (aged 31)	Right-handed	Right-arm off-break	2022	₹50 lakh (US$59,000)	
23	B Sai Sudharsan	India	15 October 2001 (aged 20)	Left-handed	Slow left-arm orthodox	2022	₹20 lakh (US$24,000)	
67	**Jason Roy**	England	21 July 1990 (aged 31)	Right-handed	Right-arm medium	2022	₹2 crore (US$240,000)	Overseas
All-rounders
09	Rahul Tewatia	India	20 May 1993 (aged 28)	Right-handed	Right-arm leg break	2022	₹9 crore (US$1.1 million)	
18	Abhinav Sadarangani	India	16 September 1994 (aged 27)	Right-handed	Right-arm leg break	2022	₹2.60 crore (US$310,000)	
46	**Vijay Shankar**	India	26 January 1991 (aged 31)	Right-handed	Right-arm medium	2022	₹1.40 crore (US$170,000)	
48	**Dominic Drakes**	West Indies	6 February 1998 (aged 24)	Left-handed	Left-arm medium-fast	2022	₹1.10 crore (US$130,000)	Overseas
Wicket-keepers
6	**Wriddhiman Saha**	India	24 October 1984 (aged 37)	Right-handed	-	2022	₹1.90 crore (US$220,000)	
13	**Matthew Wade**	Australia	26 December 1987 (aged 34)	Left-handed	-	2022	₹2.40 crore (US$280,000)	Overseas
16	**Rahmanullah Gurbaz**	Afghanistan	28 November 2001 (aged 20)	Right-handed	-	2022	₹50 lakh (US$59,000)	Overseas Replacement for Jason Roy
Spin Bowlers
01	Ravisrinivasan Sai Kishore	India	6 November 1996 (aged 25)	Left-handed	Slow left-arm orthodox	2022	₹3 crore (US$350,000)	
15	Noor Ahmad	Afghanistan	3 January 2005 (aged 17)	Right-handed	Left-arm Unorthodox Spin	2022	₹30 lakh (US$35,000)	Overseas
19	**Rashid Khan**	Afghanistan	20 September 1998 (aged 23)	Right-handed	Right-arm leg break	2022	₹15 crore (US$1.8 million)	Overseas
22	**Jayant Yadav**	India	20 January 1990 (aged 32)	Right-handed	Right-arm off-break	2022	₹1.70 crore (US$200,000)	
Pace Bowlers
04	Darshan Nalkande	India	4 October 1998 (aged 23)	Right-handed	Right-arm fast-medium	2022	₹20 lakh (US$24,000)	
8	**Alzarri Joseph**	West Indies	20 November 1996 (aged 25)	Right-handed	Right-arm fast medium	2022	₹2.40 crore (US$280,000)	Overseas
11	**Mohammed Shami**	India	3 September 1990 (aged 31)	Right-handed	Right arm fast	2022	₹6.25 crore (US$740,000)	
12	Pradeep Sangwan	India	5 November 1990 (aged 31)	Right-handed	Left arm fast-medium	2022	₹20 lakh (US$24,000)	
69	**Lockie Ferguson**	New Zealand	13 June 1991 (aged 30)	Right-handed	Right arm fast	2022	₹10 crore (US$1.2 million)	Overseas
77	**Varun Aaron**	India	29 October 1989 (aged 32)	Right-handed	Right arm fast	2022	₹50 lakh (US$59,000)	
133	Yash Dayal	India	13 December 1997 (aged 24)	Left-handed	Left arm fast	2022	₹3.20 crore (US$380,000)	

== Administration and support staff ==
Position	Name
Director of cricket	Vikram Solanki
Head coach	Ashish Nehra
Batting coach and mentor	Gary Kirsten
Spin bowling coach and scout	Aashish Kapoor

== Kit manufacturers and sponsors ==
Kit manufacturer	Shirt sponsor (chest)	Shirt sponsor (back)	Chest branding
EM Sports	Ather Energy	BKT	Capri Global
Source :

T20 uniform

== Points table ==
Pos	Grp	Team	Pld	W	L	NR	Pts	NRR	Qualification
1	B	Gujarat Titans (C)	14	10	4	0	20	0.316	Advanced to Qualifier 1
2	A	Rajasthan Royals (R)	14	9	5	0	18	0.298	Advanced to Qualifier 1
3	A	Lucknow Super Giants (4th)	14	9	5	0	18	0.251	Advanced to Eliminator
4	B	Royal Challengers Bangalore (3rd)	14	8	6	0	16	−0.253	Advanced to Eliminator
5	A	Delhi Capitals	14	7	7	0	14	0.204	
6	B	Punjab Kings	14	7	7	0	14	0.126	
7	A	Kolkata Knight Riders	14	6	8	0	12	0.146	
8	B	Sunrisers Hyderabad	14	6	8	0	12	−0.379	
9	B	Chennai Super Kings	14	4	10	0	8	−0.203	
10	A	Mumbai Indians	14	4	10	0	8	−0.506	

Source: IPLT20.com
(C) Champions; (R) Runners-up
The four top-ranked teams qualified for the playoffs.

== Group fixtures ==
Match 4
28 March 2022
19:30 (N)
Scorecard

Lucknow Super Giants; 158/6 (20 overs)	v	Gujarat Titans; 161/5 (19.4 overs)
Deepak Hooda 55 (41); Mohammed Shami 3/25 (4 overs)		Rahul Tewatia 40* (24); Dushmantha Chameera 2/22 (3 overs)

Gujarat Titans won by 5 wickets
Wankhede Stadium, Mumbai
Umpires: Pashchim Pathak (Ind) and Virender Sharma (Ind)
Player of the match: Mohammed Shami (Gujarat Titans)

- Gujarat Titans won the toss and elected to field.

Match 10
2 April 2022
19:30 (N)
Scorecard

Gujarat Titans; 171/6 (20 overs)	v	Delhi Capitals; 157/9 (20 overs)
Shubman Gill 84 (46); Mustafizur Rahman 3/23 (4 overs)		Rishabh Pant 43 (29); Lockie Ferguson 4/28 (4 overs)

Gujarat Titans won by 14 runs
MCA International Stadium, Pune
Umpires: K. N. Ananthapadmanabhan (Ind) and Ulhas Gandhe (Ind)
Player of the match: Lockie Ferguson (Gujarat Titans)

- Delhi Capitals won the toss and elected to field.

Match 16
8 April 2022
19:30 (N)
Scorecard

Punjab Kings; 189/9 (20 overs)	v	Gujarat Titans; 190/4 (20 overs)
Liam Livingstone 64 (27); Rashid Khan 3/22 (4 overs)		Shubman Gill 96 (59); Kagiso Rabada 2/35 (4 overs)

Gujarat Titans won by 6 wickets
Brabourne Stadium, Mumbai
Umpires: Anil Chaudhary (Ind) and Virender Sharma (Ind)
Player of the match: Shubman Gill (Gujarat Titans)

- Gujarat Titans won the toss and elected to field.

Match 21
11 April 2022
19:30 (N)
Scorecard

Sunrisers Hyderabad; 168/2 (19.1 overs)	v	Gujarat Titans; 162/7 (20 overs)
Kane Williamson 57 (46); Hardik Pandya 1/27 (4 overs)		Hardik Pandya 50* (42); T. Natarajan 2/34 (4 overs)

Sunrisers Hyderabad won by 8 wickets
DY Patil Stadium, Navi Mumbai
Umpires: Chirra Ravikanthreddy (Ind) and Rod Tucker (Aus)
Player of the match: Kane Williamson (Sunrisers Hyderabad)

- Sunrisers Hyderabad won the toss and elected to field.

Match 24
14 April 2022
19:30 (N)
Scorecard

Gujarat Titans; 192/4 (20 overs)	v	Rajasthan Royals; 155/9 (20 overs)
Hardik Pandya 87* (52); Riyan Parag 1/12 (1 over)		Jos Buttler 54 (24); Lockie Ferguson 3/23 (4 overs)

Gujarat Titans won by 37 runs
DY Patil Stadium, Navi Mumbai
Umpires: Chris Gaffaney (NZ) and Rohan Pandit (Ind)
Player of the match: Hardik Pandya (Gujarat Titans)

- Rajasthan Royals won the toss and elected to field.

Match 29
17 April 2022
19:30 (N)
Scorecard

Chennai Super Kings; 169/5 (20 overs)	v	Gujarat Titans; 170/7 (19.5 overs)
Ruturaj Gaikwad 73 (48); Alzarri Joseph 2/34 (4 overs)		David Miller 94* (51); Dwayne Bravo 3/23 (4 overs)

Gujarat Titans won by 3 wickets
MCA International Stadium, Pune
Umpires: K. N. Ananthapadmanabhan (Ind) and Ulhas Gandhe (Ind)
Player of the match: David Miller (Gujarat Titans)

- Gujarat Titans won the toss and elected to field

Match 35
23 April 2022
15:30 (D/N)
Scorecard

Gujarat Titans; 156/9 (20 overs)	v	Kolkata Knight Riders; 148/8 (20 overs)
Hardik Pandya 67 (49); Andre Russell 4/5 (1 over)		Andre Russell 48 (25); Mohammed Shami 2/20 (4 overs)

Gujarat Titans won by 8 runs
DY Patil Stadium, Navi Mumbai
Umpires: Ulhas Gandhe (Ind) and K. N. Ananthapadmanabhan (Ind)
Player of the match: Rashid Khan (Gujarat Titans)

- Gujarat Titans won the toss and elected to bat.

Match 40
27 April 2022
19:30 (N)
Scorecard

Sunrisers Hyderabad; 195/6 (20 overs)	v	Gujarat Titans; 199/5 (20 overs)
Abhishek Sharma 65 (42); Mohammed Shami 3/39 (4 overs)		Wriddhiman Saha 68 (38); Umran Malik 5/25 (4 overs)

Gujarat Titans won by 5 wickets
Wankhede Stadium, Mumbai
Umpires: Chris Gaffaney (NZ) and Navdeep Singh (Ind)
Player of the match: Umran Malik (Sunrisers Hyderabad)

- Gujarat Titans won the toss and elected to field.
- Umran Malik (Sunrisers Hyderabad) took his first five-wicket haul.

Match 43
30 April 2022
15:30 (D/N)
Scorecard

Royal Challengers Bangalore; 170/6 (20 overs)	v	Gujarat Titans; 174/4 (19.3 overs)
Virat Kohli 58 (53); Pradeep Sangwan 2/19 (4 overs)		Rahul Tewatia 43* (25); Shahbaz Ahmed 2/26 (3 overs)

Gujarat Titans won by 6 wickets
Brabourne Stadium, Mumbai
Umpires: Saiyed Khalid (Ind) and Virender Sharma (Ind)
Player of the match: Rahul Tewatia (Gujarat Titans)

- Royal Challengers Bangalore won the toss and elected to bat.

Match 48
3 May 2022
19:30 (N)
Scorecard

Gujarat Titans; 143/8 (20 overs)	v	Punjab Kings; 145/2 (16 overs)
Sai Sudharsan 65* (50); Kagiso Rabada 4/33 (4 overs)		Shikhar Dhawan 62* (53); Lockie Ferguson 1/29 (3 overs)

Punjab Kings won by 8 wickets
DY Patil Stadium, Navi Mumbai
Umpires: Rohan Pandit (Ind) and Virender Sharma (Ind)
Player of the match: Kagiso Rabada (Punjab Kings)

- Gujarat Titans won the toss and elected to bat.

Match 51
6 May 2022
19:30 (N)
Scorecard

Mumbai Indians; 177/6 (20 overs)	v	Gujarat Titans; 172/5 (20 overs)
Ishan Kishan 45 (29); Rashid Khan 2/24 (4 overs)		Wriddhiman Saha 55 (40); Murugan Ashwin 2/29 (4 overs)

Mumbai Indians won by 5 runs
Brabourne Stadium, Mumbai
Umpires: Sadashiv Iyer (Ind) and Jayaraman Madanagopal (Ind)
Player of the match: Tim David (Mumbai Indians)

- Gujarat Titans won the toss and elected to field.

Match 57
10 May 2022
19:30 (N)
Scorecard

Gujarat Titans; 144/4 (20 overs)	v	Lucknow Super Giants; 82 (13.5 overs)
Shubman Gill 63* (49); Avesh Khan 2/26 (4 overs)		Deepak Hooda 27 (26); Rashid Khan 4/24 (3.5 overs)

Gujarat Titans won by 62 runs
MCA International Stadium, Pune
Umpires: K. N. Ananthapadmanabhan (Ind) and Michael Gough (Eng)
Player of the match: Shubman Gill (Gujarat Titans)

- Gujarat Titans won the toss and elected to bat.
- Gujarat Titans qualified for the playoffs as a result of this match.

Match 62
15 May 2022
15:30 (D/N)
Scorecard

Chennai Super Kings; 133/5 (20 overs)	v	Gujarat Titans; 137/3 (19.1 overs)
Ruturaj Gaikwad 53 (49); Mohammed Shami 2/19 (4 overs)		Wriddhiman Saha 67* (57); Matheesha Pathirana 2/24 (3.1 overs)

Gujarat Titans won by 7 wickets
Wankhede Stadium, Mumbai
Umpires: Rohan Pandit (Ind) and Virender Sharma (Ind)
Player of the match: Wriddhiman Saha (Gujarat Titans)

- Chennai Super Kings won the toss and elected to bat.

Match 67
19 May 2022
19:30 (N)
Scorecard

Gujarat Titans; 168/5 (20 overs)	v	Royal Challengers Bangalore; 170/2 (18.4 overs)
Hardik Pandya 62* (47); Josh Hazlewood 2/39 (4 overs)		Virat Kohli 73 (54); Rashid Khan 2/32 (4 overs)

Royal Challengers Bangalore won by 8 wickets
Wankhede Stadium, Mumbai
Umpires: K. N. Ananthapadmanabhan (Ind) and Sadashiv Iyer (Ind)
Player of the match: Virat Kohli (Royal Challengers Bangalore)

- Gujarat Titans won the toss and elected to bat.
- Punjab Kings and Sunrisers Hyderabad were eliminated as a result of this match.

== Playoffs ==
=== Preliminary ===
==== Qualifier 1 ====
24 May 2022
19:30 (N)
Scorecard

Rajasthan Royals; 188/6 (20 overs)	v	Gujarat Titans; 191/3 (19.3 overs)
Jos Buttler 89 (56); Hardik Pandya 1/14 (2 overs)		David Miller 68* (38); Trent Boult 1/38 (4 overs)

Gujarat Titans won by 7 wickets
Eden Gardens, Kolkata
Umpires: Bruce Oxenford (Aus) and Virender Sharma (Ind)
Player of the match: David Miller (Gujarat Titans)

- Gujarat Titans won the toss and elected to field.

=== Final ===
29 May 2022
20:00 (N)
Scorecard

Gujarat Titans; 133/3 (18.1 overs)	v	Rajasthan Royals; 130/9 (20 overs)
Shubman Gill 45* (43); Trent Boult 1/14 (4 overs)		Jos Buttler 39 (35); Hardik Pandya 3/17 (4 overs)

Gujarat Titans won by 7 wickets
Narendra Modi Stadium, Ahmedabad
Umpires: Chris Gaffaney (NZ) and Nitin Menon (Ind)
Player of the match: Hardik Pandya (Gujarat Titans)

- Rajasthan Royals won the toss and elected to bat.
