= Gujarat Titans =

Ahmedabad-based cricket franchise in the Indian Premier League

- League: Indian Premier League

Personnel
- Captain: Shubman Gill
- Coach: Ashish Nehra
- Owner: Torrent Group (67%); CVC Capital Partners (33%)
- Manager: Satyajit Parab

Team information
- City: Ahmedabad, Gujarat, India
- Colours: GT
- Founded: 2022; 4 years ago
- Home ground: Narendra Modi Stadium, Ahmedabad
- Capacity: 132,000

History
- Indian Premier League wins: 1 (2022)
- Official website: gujarattitansipl.com
Regular kit
awareness kit

The Gujarat Titans, also known as GT, are a professional Twenty20 cricket team based in Ahmedabad, Gujarat, that competes in the Indian Premier League (IPL). The home ground of the team is Narendra Modi Stadium. The franchise is owned by Torrent Group and CVC Capital Partners. The team is captained by Shubman Gill and coached by Ashish Nehra. They won their maiden title in their debut season in 2022 under former captain Hardik Pandya and secured the runners-up position the following season, in 2023 and subsequently also in 2026.

== History ==
=== Formation ===
The Governing Council of the Indian Premier League (IPL) issued an invitation to tender for two new teams in August 2021. A total of 22 companies declared an interest, but with a high base price for the new teams, there were no more than six serious bidders. The Board of Control for Cricket in India allowed a consortium of three companies or individuals to bid for each franchise. In October 2021, CVC Capital Partners won the rights to operate the Ahmedabad franchise with a bid of ₹5,625 crore (US$600 million). Ahead of the IPL 2022 auctions, the franchise drafted Hardik Pandya as their captain,however they first offered it to Ravindra Jadeja

In Feb 2025, Torrent Group has acquired a majority stake (67%) in the franchise, with CVC Capital Partners retaining a minority stake (33%).

Although their auction methods and their selections during their first-ever auction were considered weak, and the team was written off, the Titans surprised everyone with their performances, gaining their first win against fellow newcomers Lucknow Super Giants. That win was the first in their inaugural campaign, which saw the Titans eventually win 10 of their 14 group matches, qualifying at the top of the table with 20 points. They then won the first qualifier against Rajasthan Royals, whom they would meet again in the final after their qualifier win against Royal Challengers Bangalore. Gujarat won the final by restricting Rajasthan to 130 on a pitch on which they were asked to bowl first, and chasing down the target with 11 balls to spare, which included Shubman Gill hitting the winning six off the first ball of the 19th over. Hardik Pandya was adjudged the Man of the Match for his bowling figures of 3/17 and his 34 from 30 balls with a strike rate of 113.33. Critics have praised Pandya's captaincy, bowling, and batting, with many agreeing that he and the management used their players well and worked as a team to win the tournament.

This win meant that Gujarat became the second team to win the IPL in their first season after Rajasthan Royals in the inaugural season.

== Home ground ==
The team's home ground is the Narendra Modi Stadium, which is situated in Ahmedabad, Gujarat.

== Current squad ==
- Players with international caps are listed in **bold**.
- * denotes a player who is currently unavailable for selection.
- * denotes a player who is unavailable for rest of the season.

No.	Name	Nat	Birth date	Batting style	Bowling style	Year signed	Salary	Notes
Batters
7	**Shubman Gill**	(India)	29 August 1999 (age 27)	Right-handed	Right-arm off break	2022	₹16.5 crore (US$1.8 million)	Captain
23	**Sai Sudharsan**	(India)	15 October 2001 (age 25)	Left-handed	Right-arm leg break	2022	₹8.5 crore (US$910,000)	
38	**Tom Banton**	(England)	11 November 1998 (age 28)	Right-handed	Right-arm off break	2026	₹2 crore (US$210,000)	Overseas
Wicket-keepers
63	**Jos Buttler**	(England)	8 September 1990 (age 36)	Right-handed	—N/a		₹15.75 crore (US$1.7 million)	Overseas
-	Kumar Kushagra	(India)	23 October 2004 (age 22)	Right-handed	—N/a	2025	₹65 lakh (US$69,000)	
1	Anuj Rawat	(India)	17 October 1999 (age 27)	Left-handed	—N/a	2025	₹30 lakh (US$32,000)	
All-rounders
22	**Jayant Yadav**	(India)	22 January 1990 (age 36)	Right-handed	Right-arm off break	2022	₹75 lakh (US$80,000)	
46	Rahul Tewatia	(India)	20 May 1993 (age 33)	Left-handed	Right-arm leg break	2022	₹4 crore (US$430,000)	
98	**Jason Holder**	(Barbados)	5 November 1991 (age 35)	Right-handed	Right-arm medium-fast	2026	₹7 crore (US$750,000)	Overseas
23	**Glenn Phillips**	(New Zealand)	6 December 1996 (age 29)	Right-handed	Right-arm off break	2025	₹2 crore (US$210,000)	Overseas
19	**Rashid Khan**	(Afghanistan)	20 September 1998 (age 28)	Right-handed	Right-arm leg break	2022	₹18 crore (US$1.9 million)	Overseas Vice-Captain
5	**Washington Sundar**	(India)	5 October 1999 (age 27)	Left-handed	Right-arm off break	2025	₹3.2 crore (US$340,000)	
16	**Harshal Patel**	(India)	23 November 1990 (age 35)	Right-handed	Right arm fast-medium	2027	₹4 crore (US$430,000)	
30	**Manav Suthar**	(India)	3 August 2002 (age 24)	Left-handed	Left-arm orthodox	2024	₹30 lakh (US$32,000)	
60	**Sai Kishore**	(India)	6 November 1996 (age 30)	Left-handed	Left-arm orthodox	2022	₹2 crore (US$210,000)	
20	**Arshad Khan**	(India)	20 December 1997 (age 28)	Right-handed	Left-arm medium	2025	₹1.3 crore (US$140,000)	
27	Nishant Sindhu	(India)	9 April 2004 (age 22)	Left-handed	Left-arm orthodox	2025	₹30 lakh (US$32,000)	
Pace bowlers
73	**Mohammed Siraj**	(India)	13 March 1994 (age 32)	Right-handed	Right-arm fast	2025	₹12.25 crore (US$1.3 million)	
25	**Kagiso Rabada**	(South Africa)	25 May 1995 (age 31)	Left-handed	Right-arm fast	2025	₹10.75 crore (US$1.1 million)	Overseas
43	**Prasidh Krishna**	(India)	19 February 1996 (age 30)	Right-handed	Right-arm fast-medium	2025	₹9.5 crore (US$1.0 million)	
18	**Gurnoor Brar**	(India)	25 May 2000 (age 26)	Left-handed	Right-arm fast	2025	₹1.3 crore (US$140,000)	
45	**Ashok Sharma**	(India)	17 June 2002 (age 24)	Right-handed	Right-arm medium-fast	2026	₹90 lakh (US$96,000)	
Spin bowlers
Source: GT Squad

== Administration and support staff ==
Position	Name
CEO	(India) Arvinder Singh
Team manager	(India) Satyajit Parab
Director of cricket	(England) Vikram Solanki
Head coach	(India) Ashish Nehra
Batting coach	(India) Parthiv Patel
Batting Coach	(Australia) Matthew Hayden
Assistant coach	(India) Vijay Dahiya
Spin bowling coach	(India) Aashish Kapoor
Fast bowling coach	(United Kingdom) Naeem Amin
Fielding coach	(India) Narender Negi
Wicket keeping coach	(Australia) Matthew Wade
Head physiotherapist	(India) Rohit Sawalkar
Source: GT Staff

== Statistics ==
=== Overall results in the IPL ===
Last updated: 31 May 2026

Year	Played	Won	Lost	NR	Aban	League Position	Result	Most Runs	Most Wickets
2022	16	12	4	0	0	1/10	Champions	Hardik Pandya (487)	Mohammed Shami (20)
2023	17	11	6	0	0	1/10	Runners-up	Shubman Gill (890)	Mohammed Shami (28)
2024	12	5	7	0	2	8/10	League stage	Sai Sudharsan (527)	Mohit Sharma (13)
2025	15	9	6	0	0	3/10	Playoffs	Sai Sudharsan (759)	Prasidh Krishna (25)
2026	17	10	7	0	0	2/10	Runners-up	Shubman Gill (732)	Kagiso Rabada (29)
Total	77	47	30	0	2	61.04%	1 Title	Shubman Gill (3181)	Rashid Khan (86)

Performance in IPL Playoffs

Stage	Played	Won	Lost	NR	Win %
Qualifier 1	3	1	2	0	33.33%
Eliminator	1	0	1	0	0.00%
Qualifier 2	2	2	0	0	100.00%
Final	3	1	2	0	33.33%
Total	9	4	5	0	44.44%

=== By Opponent ===
Last updated: 31 May 2026

Opponent	Played	Won	Lost	NR	Win %
Chennai Super Kings	10	6	4	0	60.00%
Delhi Capitals	8	5	3	0	62.50%
Kolkata Knight Riders	6	4	2	0	66.67%
Lucknow Super Giants	8	5	3	0	62.50%
Mumbai Indians	9	5	4	0	55.56%
Punjab Kings	8	4	4	0	50.00%
Rajasthan Royals	11	8	3	0	72.73%
Royal Challengers Bengaluru	10	4	6	0	40.00%
Sunrisers Hyderabad	7	6	1	0	85.71%
Total	77	47	30	0	61.04%

=== First IPL match wins ===
Opponent	Home		Away / Neutral	
Opponent	Venue	Year	Venue	Year
Chennai Super Kings	Narendra Modi Stadium, Ahmedabad, India	2023	Maharashtra Cricket Association Stadium, Pune, India	2022
Delhi Capitals	Narendra Modi Stadium, Ahmedabad, India	2023	Maharashtra Cricket Association Stadium, Pune, India	2022
Lucknow Super Giants	Narendra Modi Stadium, Ahmedabad, India	2023	Wankhede Stadium, Mumbai, India	2022
Rajasthan Royals	Narendra Modi Stadium, Ahmedabad, India	2022	DY Patil Stadium, Navi Mumbai, India	2022
Mumbai Indians	Narendra Modi Stadium, Ahmedabad, India	2023	Wankhede Stadium, Mumbai, India	2025
Sunrisers Hyderabad	Narendra Modi Stadium, Ahmedabad, India	2023	Wankhede Stadium, Mumbai, India	2022
Kolkata Knight Riders	Narendra Modi Stadium, Ahmedabad, India	2026	DY Patil Stadium, Navi Mumbai, India	2022
Punjab Kings	Narendra Modi Stadium, Ahmedabad, India	2026	Brabourne Stadium, Mumbai, India	2022
Royal Challengers Bengaluru	Narendra Modi Stadium, Ahmedabad, India	2026	Brabourne Stadium, Mumbai, India	2022
Last Updated: 5 June 2026

=== Captaincy record ===
Last updated: 31 May 2026

Player	Nationality (Note: The information in the nationality column is according to Cricinfo. This information may not necessarily reflect the player's birthplace or citizenship.)	Duration	Matches	Won	Lost	Tied	NR	Win%	Best Result
Hardik Pandya	India	2022–2023	31	22	9	0	0	70.96	Champions (2022)
Rashid Khan (Note: Stand-in)	Afghanistan	2022	3	1	2	0	0	33.33	
Shubman Gill	India	2024–present	43	24	19	0	0	55.81	Runners Up (2026)

=== Greatest win margin (by runs) ===
Margin	Opponent	Venue	Date
89 Runs	Chennai Super Kings	Narendra Modi Stadium , Ahmedabad , India	21 May 2026
82 Runs	Sunrisers Hyderabad	Narendra Modi Stadium , Ahmedabad , India	12 May 2026
77 Runs	Rajasthan Royals	Sawai Mansingh Stadium , Jaipur , India	9 May 2026
62 Runs	Lucknow Super Giants	Maharashtra Cricket Association Stadium, Pune, India	10 May 2022
62 Runs	Mumbai Indians	Narendra Modi Stadium, Ahmedabad, India	25 May 2023
58 Runs	Rajasthan Royals	Narendra Modi Stadium, Ahmedabad, India	9 April 2025
56 runs	Lucknow Super Giants	Narendra Modi Stadium, Ahmedabad, India	7 May 2023
55 runs	Mumbai Indians	Narendra Modi Stadium, Ahmedabad, India	25 April 2022
Last Updated: 9 April 2025

=== Greatest win margin (by balls remaining) ===
Margin	Opponent	Venue	Date
37	Rajasthan Royals	Sawai Mansingh Stadium, Jaipur, India	5 May 2023
20	Sunrisers Hyderabad	Rajiv Gandhi International Cricket Stadium, Hyderabad, India	6 April 2025
13	Kolkata Knight Riders	Eden Gardens, Kolkata, India	29 April 2023
13	Royal Challengers Bengaluru	M. Chinnaswamy Stadium, Bengaluru, India	2 April 2025
11	Rajasthan Royals	Narendra Modi Stadium Ahmedabad, India	29 May 2022
11	Delhi Capitals	Arun Jaitley Stadium, Delhi, India	4 April 2023
Last Updated: 2 April 2025

=== Greatest win (by wickets) ===
Margin	Opponent	Venue	Date
10 wickets	Delhi Capitals	Arun Jaitley Cricket Stadium, New Delhi, India	19 May 2025
9 wickets	Rajasthan Royals	Sawai Mansingh Stadium, Jaipur, India	5 May 2023
8 wickets	Royal Challengers Bengaluru	M. Chinnaswamy Stadium, Bengaluru, India	2 April 2025
8 wickets	Chennai Super Kings	M. A. Chidambaram Stadium, Chennai, India	26 April 2026
7 wickets
7 wickets	Rajasthan Royals	Narendra Modi Stadium, Ahmedabad, India	29 May 2022
7 wickets	Kolkata Knight Riders	Eden Gardens, Kolkata, India	29 April 2023
7 wickets	Sunrisers Hyderabad	Rajiv Gandhi International Cricket Stadium, Hyderabad, India	6 April 2025
7 wickets	Rajasthan Royals	PCA New Cricket Stadium, Chandigarh, India	29 May 2026
7 wickets	Lucknow Super Giants	Ekana Cricket Stadium, Lucknow, India	12 April 2026
Last Updated: 22 April 2025

=== Narrowest win margin (by runs) ===
Margin	Opponent	Venue	Date
01 Runs	Delhi Capitals	Arun Jaitley Stadium, New Delhi, India	8 April 2026
06 Runs	Mumbai Indians	Narendra Modi Stadium, Ahmedabad, India	24 April 2024
07 Runs	Lucknow Super Giants	Ekana Cricket Stadium, Lucknow, India	22 April 2023
08 Runs	Kolkata Knight Riders	DY Patil Stadium, Navi Mumbai, India	23 April 2022
14 Runs	Delhi Capitals	Maharashtra Cricket Association Stadium, Mumbai, India	2 April 2022
34 Runs	Sunrisers Hyderabad	Narendra Modi Stadium, Ahmedabad, India	15 May 2023
Last Updated: 24 April 2024

=== Narrowest win margin (by balls remaining) ===
Margin	Opponent	Venue	Date
0 ball	Punjab Kings	Brabourne Stadium, Mumbai, India	8 April 2022
0 ball	Sunrisers Hyderabad	Wankhede Stadium, Mumbai, India	27 April 2022
0 ball	Rajasthan Royals	Sawai Mansingh Stadium, Jaipur, India	10 April 2024
1 ball	Chennai Super Kings	Maharashtra Cricket Association Stadium, Pune, India	17 April 2022
1 ball	Punjab Kings	Punjab Cricket Association Stadium, Mohali, India	13 April 2023
Last Updated: 10 April 2024

=== Narrowest win margins (by wickets) ===
Margin	Opponent	Venue	Date
3 wickets	Chennai Super Kings	Maharashtra Cricket Association Stadium, Pune, India	17 April 2022
3 wickets	Rajasthan Royals	Sawai Mansingh Stadium, Jaipur, India	10 April 2024
3 wickets	Punjab Kings	Maharaja Yadavindra Singh International Cricket Stadium, Mohali, India	21 April 2024
4 wickets
4 wickets	Royal Challengers Bengaluru	Narendra Modi Stadium, Ahmedabad, India	30 April 2026
4 wickets	Punjab Kings	Narendra Modi Stadium, Ahmedabad, India	3 May 2026
5 wickets	Lucknow Super Giants	Wankhede Stadium, Mumbai, India	28 March 2022
5 wickets	Sunrisers Hyderabad	Wankhede Stadium, Mumbai, India	27 April 2022
5 wickets	Chennai Super Kings	Narendra Modi Stadium, Ahmedabad, India	31 March 2023
5 wickets	Kolkata Knight Riders	Narendra Modi Stadium, Ahmedabad, India	17 April 2026
Last Updated: 21 April 2024

=== Greatest loss margin (by runs) ===
Margin	Opposition	Venue	Date
99 runs	MI	Narendra Modi Stadium, Ahmedabad, India	20 April 2026
92 runs	RCB	HPCA Stadium, Dharamsala, India	26 May 2026
63 runs	CSK	M. A. Chidambaram Stadium, Chennai, India	26 March 2024
33 runs	LSG	Ekana Cricket Stadium, Lucknow, India	7 April 2024
27 runs	MI	Wankhede Stadium, Mumbai, India	12 May 2023
15 runs	CSK	M. A. Chidambaram Stadium, Chennai, India	23 May 2023
11 runs	PBKS	Narendra Modi Stadium, Ahmedabad, India	25 March 2023
Last Updated: 26 March 2024

=== Greatest loss margin (by balls remaining) ===
Balls remaining	Margin	Opposition	Venue	Date
67	6 wickets	DC	Narendra Modi Stadium, Ahmedabad, India	17 April 2024
38	4 wickets	RCB	M. Chinnaswamy Stadium, Bengaluru, India	4 May 2024
24	8 wickets	PBKS	DY Patil Stadium, Navi Mumbai, India	3 May 2022
24	9 wickets	RCB	Narendra Modi Stadium, Ahmedabad, India	28 April 2024
08	8 wickets	RCB	Wankhede Stadium, Mumbai, India	19 May 2022
Last Updated: 4 May 2024

=== Greatest loss margins (by wickets) ===
Margin	Opposition	Venue	Date
9 wickets	RCB	Narendra Modi Stadium, Ahmedabad, India	28 April 2024
8 wickets	PBKS	DY Patil Stadium, Navi Mumbai, India	3 May 2022
6 wickets	DC	Narendra Modi Stadium, Ahmedabad, India	17 April 2024
4 wickets	RCB	M. Chinnaswamy Stadium, Bengaluru, India	4 May 2024
Last Updated: 4 May 2024

=== Narrowest loss margin (by runs) ===
Margin	Opposition	Venue	Date
4 run	DC	Arun Jaitley Cricket Stadium, New Delhi, India	24 April 2024
5 runs	DC	Narendra Modi Stadium, Ahmedabad, India	6 May 2022
5 runs	MI	Brabourne Stadium, Mumbai, India	2 May 2023
11 runs	PBKS	Narendra Modi Stadium, Ahmedabad, India	25 March 2025
15 runs	CSK	M. A. Chidambaram Stadium, Chennai, India	23 May 2023
Last Updated: 25 March 2025

=== Narrowest loss margin (by balls remaining) ===
Balls remaining	Margin	Opposition	Venue	Date
0 ball	5 wickets	CSK	Narendra Modi Stadium, Ahmedabad, India	9 April 2023
0 ball	3 wickets	KKR	Narendra Modi Stadium, Ahmedabad, India	28 May 2023
1 ball	3 wickets	PBKS	Narendra Modi Stadium, Ahmedabad, India	4 April 2024
3 balls	6 wickets	LSG	Ekana Cricket Stadium, Lucknow, India	12 April 2025
4 balls	3 wickets	RR	Narendra Modi Stadium, Ahmedabad, India	16 April 2023
5 balls	8 wickets	SRH	DY Patil Stadium, Navi Mumbai, India	11 April 2022
Last Updated: 12 April 2025

=== Narrowest loss margins (by wickets) ===
Margin	Opposition	Venue	Date
3 wicket	KKR	Narendra Modi Stadium, Ahmedabad, India	9 April 2023
3 wicket	RR	Narendra Modi Stadium, Ahmedabad, India	16 April 2023
3 wicket	PBKS	Narendra Modi Stadium, Ahmedabad, India	4 April 2024
4 wickets	RCB	M. A. Chidambaram Stadium, Bengaluru, India	4 May 2024
5 wickets	CSK	Narendra Modi Stadium, Ahemdabad, India	28 May 2023
Last Updated: 4 April 2024

=== Highest Totals ===
Score	Opposition	Venue	Date
233/3	MI	Narendra Modi Stadium, Ahmedabad, India	26 May 2023
232/5	PBKS	Narendra Modi Stadium, Ahmedabad, India	25 March 2025
231/3	CSK	Narendra Modi Stadium, Ahmedabad, India	10 May 2024
227/2	LSG	Narendra Modi Stadium, Ahmedabad, India	07 May 2023
220/8	DC	Arun Jaitley Cricket Stadium, New Delhi, India	24 April 2024
Last updated: 25 March 2025

=== Lowest Totals ===
Score	Opposition	Venue	Date
89	Delhi Capitals	Narendra Modi Stadium, Ahmedabad, India	17 April 2024
125/6	Delhi Capitals	Narendra Modi Stadium, Ahmedabad, India	2 May 2023
130	Lucknow Super Giants	Ekana Cricket Stadium, Lucknow, India	7 April 2024
135/6	Lucknow Super Giants	Ekana Cricket Stadium, Lucknow, India	22 April 2023
143/8	Punjab Kings	DY Patil Stadium, Navi Mumbai, India	3 May 2022
143/8	Chennai Super Kings	M. A. Chidambaram Stadium, Chennai, India	26 March 2024
Last updated: 17 April 2024

=== Highest Totals Conceded ===
254/5	RCB	HPCA stadium, Dharamshala	26 May 2026
243/5	PBKS	Narendra Modi Stadium, Ahmedabad, India	25 March 2025
224/4	DC	Arun Jaitley Cricket Stadium, New Delhi, India	24 April 2024
218/5	MI	Wankhede Stadium, Mumbai, India	12 May 2023
207/7	KKR	Narendra Modi Stadium, Ahmedabad, India	09 April 2024
206/1	RCB	Narendra Modi Stadium, Ahmedabad, India	28 April 2024
Last updated:25 March 2025

=== Lowest Totals Conceded ===
Score	Opposition	Venue	Date
82	LSG	Maharashtra Cricket Association Stadium, Pune, India	10 May 2022
118	RR	Sawai Mansingh Indoor Stadium, Jaipur, India	5 May 2023
128/7	LSG	Ekana Cricket Stadium, Lucknow, India	22 April 2023
130/9	RR	Narendra Modi Stadium, Ahmedabad, India	29 May 2022
130/8	DC	Narendra Modi Stadium, Ahmedabad, India	2 May 2023
Last updated: 20 October 2020

=== Highest match aggregate ===
Aggregate	Team 1	Team 2	Venue	Date
475/10	GT (243/5)	PBKS (232/5)		25 March 2025
444/12	Gt (220/8)	DC (224/4)		24 April 2024
427/11	GT (231/3)	CSK (196/8)		10 May 2024
411/11	GT (204/4)	KKR (207/7)		9 April 2023
409/13	GT (191/8)	MI (218/5)	Wankhede Stadium, Mumbai, India	12 May 2023
Last updated: 25 March 2025

=== Lowest match aggregate ===
Aggregate	Team 1	Team 2	Venue	Date
181/14	GT (89)	DC (92/4)	Narendra Modi Stadium, Ahmedabad, India	17 April 2024
226/14	GT (144/4)	LSG (82)	Maharashtra Cricket Association Stadium, Pune, India	10 May 2022
237/11	GT (119/1)	RR (118)	Sawai Mansingh Stadium, Jaipur, India	5 May 2023
255/14	GT (125/6)	DC (130/8)	Narendra Modi Stadium, Ahmedabad, India	2 May 2023
263/13	GT (135/6)	LSG (128/7)	Ekana Cricket Stadium, Lucknow, India	22 April 2023
Last updated: 17 April 2024

=== Most career runs ===
A run is the basic means of scoring in cricket. A run is scored when the batsman hits the ball with his bat and with his partner runs the length of 22 yards (20 m) of the pitch.

Rank	Runs	Player	Matches	Innings	Period
1	3171	Shubman Gill†	75	75	2022-2026
2	2503	Sai Sudharsan†	56	56	2022-2026
3	1045	Jos buttler†	30	29	2025-2026
4	950	David Miller	41	38	2022-2024
5	833	Hardik Pandya	31	30	2022-2023
6	824	Wriddhiman Saha	37	37	2022-2024
Last Updated: 3 May 2025

=== Fastest runs getter ===
Runs	Batsman	Innings	Record Date	Reference
1,000	Sai Sudharsan	25	10 May 2024	
2,000	Sai Sudharsan	47	24 April 2026	
3,000	Shubman Gill	72	16 May 2026	

=== Most runs in each batting position ===
Batting position	Batsman	Innings	Runs	Average	Career Span	Ref
Opener	Shubman Gill†	75	3171	46.63	2022-2026	
Number 3	Jos buttler†	30	1045	47.50	2025-2026	
Number 4	Hardik Pandya	19	492	37.84	2022–2023	
Number 5	David Miller	27	749	46.81	2022–2024	
Number 6	Rahul Tewatia†	22	348	31.63	2022–2025	
Number 7	Rashid Khan†	11	139	19.85	2022–2025	
Number 8	Rashid Khan†	16	203	25.37	2022–2025	
Number 9	Sai Kishore†	3	14	7.00	2024–2025	
Number 10	Alzarri Joseph	2	11	-	2022–2023	
Number 11	Mohammed Shami	1	05	5.00	2022–2023	
Last Updated: 28 April 2025

=== Most runs against each team ===
Opposition	Runs	Batsman	Matches	Innings	Career Span
Chennai Super Kings	470	Sai Sudharsan	7	7	2022–2026
Royal Challengers Bengaluru	279	Sai Sudharsan	7	7	2022–2026
Kolkata Knight Riders	356	Shubman Gill	6	6	2022–2026
Mumbai Indians	370	Shubman Gill	9	9	2022–2026
Punjab Kings	373	Shubman Gill	8	8	2022–2026
Rajasthan Royals	520	Shubman Gill	10	10	2022–2026
Sunrisers Hyderabad	308	Shubman Gill	7	7	2022–2026
Lucknow Super Giants	327	Shubman Gill	8	8	2022–2026
Delhi Capitals	295	Sai Sudharsan	6	6	2022–2026

=== Highest individual score ===
Rank	Runs	Player	Opposition	Venue	Date
1	129	Shubman Gill	Mumbai Indians	Narendra Modi Stadium, Ahmedabad, India	26 May 2023
2	108*	Sai Sudharsan	Delhi Capitals	Arun Jaitley Cricket Stadium, Delhi, India	18 May 2025
3	104*	Shubman Gill	Royal Challengers Bengaluru	M. Chinnaswamy Stadium, Bengaluru, India	21 May 2023
4	104	Shubman Gill	Rajasthan Royals	Maharaja Yadavindra Singh International Cricket Stadium, Mullanpur	29 May 2026
4	104	Shubman Gill	Chennai Super Kings	Narendra Modi Stadium, Ahmedabad, India	10 May 2024
5	103	Sai Sudharsan	Chennai Super Kings	Narendra Modi Stadium, Ahmedabad, India	10 May 2024
Last Updated: 10 April 2024

=== Highest individual score in each batting position ===
Batting position	Batsman	Score	Opposition	Ground	Date	Ref
Opener	Shubman Gill	129	Mumbai Indians	Narendra Modi Stadium, Ahmedabad, India	26 May 2023	
Number 3	Jos Buttler	97*	Delhi Capitals	Narendra Modi Stadium, Ahmedabad, India	19 April 2025	
Number 4	Hardik Pandya	87*	Rajasthan Royals	DY Patil Stadium, Navi Mumbai, India	14 April 2022	
Number 5	David Miller	94*	Chennai Super Kings	Maharashtra Cricket Association Stadium, Pune, India	17 April 2022	
Number 6	Rahul Tewatia	43*	Royal Challengers Bengaluru	Brabourne Stadium, Mumbai, India	30 April 2022	
Number 7	Rashid Khan	40	Chennai Super Kings	Maharashtra Cricket Association Stadium, Pune, India	17 April 2022	
Number 8	Rashid Khan	79*	Mumbai Indians	Wankhede Stadium, Mumbai, India	12 May 2023	
Number 9	Sai Kishore	13	Delhi Capitals	Arun Jaitley Cricket Stadium, Delhi, India	24 April 2024	
Number 10	Alzarri Joseph	7*	Mumbai Indians	Wankhede Stadium, Mumbai, India	12 May 2023	
Number 10	Noor Ahmad	7*	Chennai Super Kings	MA Chidambaram Stadium, Chennai, India	23 May 2023	
Number 11	Mohammed Shami	5	Chennai Super Kings	MA Chidambaram Stadium, Chennai, India	23 May 2023	
Last Updated: 2 February 2025

=== Highest career average ===
A batsman's batting average is the total number of runs they have scored divided by the number of times they have been dismissed.

Rank	Average	Player	Innings	Not out	Runs	Period
1	49.08	Sai Sudharsan†	56	5	2503	2022-2026
2	47.50	Jos Buttler†	29	7	1045	2025-2026
3	46.63	Shubman Gill†	75	7	3171	2022-2026
Qualification: 20 innings. Last Updated: 4 May 2025

=== Highest average in each batting position ===
Batting position	Batsman	Innings	Runs	Average	Career Span	Ref
Opener	Sai Sudharsan†	13	673	51.76	2024–2025	
Number 3	Jos Buttler†	10	470	78.33	2025-2025	
Number 4	Hardik Pandya	19	492	37.84	2022–2023	
Number 5	David Miller	27	749	46.81	2022–2024	
Number 6	Rahul Tewatia†	21	337	30.63	2022–2025	
Number 7	Rashid Khan†	10	137	22.83	2022–2025	
Number 8	Rashid Khan†	16	203	25.37	2022–2025	
Number 9	Umesh Yadav	2	12	12.00	2024-2024	
Number 10	Noor Ahmad	2	8	8.00	2023–2024	
Number 11	Mohammed Shami	1	5	5.00	2022–2024	
Qualification: Minimum 10 innings batted at position. Last updated: 2 February 2025

=== Most half-centuries ===
A half-century is a score of between 50 and 99 runs. Statistically, once a batsman's score reaches 100, it is no longer considered a half-century but a century.

Rank	Half centuries	Player	Innings	Period
1	22	Shubman Gill	75	2022-2026
2	20	Sai Sudharsan	56	2022-2026
3	==== 9 ====	Jos Buttler†	29	2025-2026
4	6	Hardik Pandya†	30	2022-2023
5	5	Wriddhiman Saha	37	2022-2024
Last Updated: 5 May 2025

=== Most centuries ===
A century is a score of 100 or more runs in a single innings.

Rank	Centuries	Player	Innings	Period
1	5	Shubman Gill†	75	2022-2026
2	3	Sai Sudharsan†	56	2022-2026
Last Updated: 2 May 2025

=== Most Sixes ===
Rank	Sixes	Player	Innings	Period
1	116	Shubman Gill†	75	2022-2026
2	82	Sai Sudharsan†	56	2022-2026
3	50	Jos Buttler†	29	2025-2026
4	44	David Miller	38	2022-2024
5	36	Rahul Tewatia	57	2022-2026
6	29	Rashid Khan†	29	2022-2026
7	27	Hardik Pandya	30	2022-2023
Last Updated: 2 February 2025

=== Most Fours ===
Rank	Fours	Player	Innings	Period
1	307	Shubman Gill†	75	2022-2026
2	256	Sai Sudharsan†	56	2022-2026
3	105	Wriddhiman Saha	37	2022–2024
4	102	Jos Buttler†	29	2025-2026
5	75	Hardik Pandya	30	2022–2023
6	74	Rahul Tewatia	57	2022-2026
5	70	David Miller	38	2022–2024
Last Updated: 3 May 2025

=== Highest strike rates ===
Rank	Strike rate	Player	Runs	Balls Faced	Period
1	169.06	Jos Buttler	470	278	2025–2025
2	152.22	Rahul Tewatia	548	350	2022–2025
3	150.43	Shubman Gill	2,264	1,505	2022–2025
4	145.25	David Miller	950	654	2022–2024
5	143.73	Sai Sudharsan	1,538	1,070	2022–2025
Qualification= 250 balls faced. Last updated: 2 May 2025

=== Highest strike rates in an inning ===
Rank	Strike rate	Player	Runs	Balls Faced	Opposition	Venue	Date
1	281.81	Rashid Khan	31*	11	Sunrisers Hyderabad	Wankhede Stadium, Mumbai, India	27 April 2022
2	262.50	Vijay Shankar	63*	24	Kolkata Knight Riders	Narendra Modi Stadium, Ahmedabad, India	9 April 2023
3	260.00	Hardik Pandya	39*	15	Rajasthan Royals	Sawai Mansingh Stadium, Jaipur, India	5 May 2023
4	246.87	Rashid Khan	79*	32	Mumbai Indians	Wankhede Stadium, Mumbai, India	12 May 2023
5	239.13	David Miller	55	23	Delhi Capitals	Arun Jaitley Cricket Stadium, Delhi, India	24 April 2024
Last Updated: 3 May 2025

=== Most runs in an IPL Season ===
Rank	Runs	Player	Matches	Innings	Year
1	890	Shubman Gill	17	17	2023
2	527	Sai Sudharsan	12	12	2024
3	504*	Sai Sudharsan	10	10	2025
4	487	Hardik Pandya	15	15	
5	483	Shubman Gill	16	16	2022
Last Updated: 5 May 2025

=== Most career wickets ===
A bowler takes the wicket of a batsman when the form of dismissal is bowled, caught, leg before wicket, stumped or hit wicket. If the batsman is dismissed by run out, obstructing the field, handling the ball, hitting the ball twice or timed out the bowler does not receive credit.

Rank	Wickets	Player	Matches	Innings	Period
1	63	Rashid Khan†	55	55	2022-2025
2	48	Mohammad Shami	33	33.	2022-2023
3	40	Mohit Sharma	26	25	2023-2024
4	25	Sai Kishore†	20	20	2022-2025
5	24	Noor Ahmad	23	23	2023-2024
Last Updated: 2 May 2025

=== Most wickets against each team ===
Opposition	Wickets	Bowler	Matches	Innings	Span	Ref
Chennai Super Kings	9	Mohit Sharma	4	4	2023-2024	
Delhi Capitals	9	Mohammed Shami	3	3	2022-2024	
Kolkata Knight Riders	7	Rashid Khan	4	4	2022-2025	
Lucknow Super Giants	9	Rashid Khan	6	6	2022-2025	
Mumbai Indians	10	Rashid Khan	6	6	2022-2025	
Mumbai Indians	10	Mohit Sharma	4	4	2023-2024	
Punjab Kings	7	Sai Kishore	2	2	2024-2025	
Punjab Kings	7	Rashid Khan	6	6	2022-2025	
Rajasthan Royals	10	Rashid Khan	8	8	2022-2025	
Royal Challengers Bengaluru	4	Rashid Khan	6	6	2022-2025	
Royal Challengers Bengaluru	4	Noor Ahmad	3	3	2023-2024	
Royal Challengers Bengaluru	4	Josh Little	1	1	2024-2024	
Sunrisers Hyderabad	7	Mohammed Shami	3	3	2022-2024	
Sunrisers Hyderabad	7	Mohit Sharma	2	2	2023-2024	
Last updated: 2 May 2025

=== Best figures in an innings ===
Bowling figures refers to the number of the wickets a bowler has taken and the number of runs conceded.

Rank	Figures	Player	Opposition	Venue	Date
1	5/10	Mohit Sharma	Mumbai Indians		26 May 2023
2	4/11	Mohammed Shami	Delhi Capitals		2 May 2023
3	4/17	Mohammed Siraj	Sunrisers Hyderabad		6 April 2025
4	4/21	Mohammed Shami	Sunrisers Hyderabad		15 May 2023
5	4/24	Rashid Khan	Lucknow Super Giants		10 may 2022
Last Updated: 6 April 2025

== Rivalries ==
=== Rajasthan Royals ===
Rajasthan Royals (also known as RR), are the main rivals of GT. They faced off in the 2022 finals, the first season GT was introduced in the IPL, where GT beat them in the finals to win their first championship. Although GT has had the upper hand with matches against RR for the most part, every season when these teams face off there is nervousness and rivalry between fans. The rivalry has been further accelerated as former RR players went to play for GT such as Rahul Tewatia, Prasidh Krishna, David Miller, and most importantly Jos Buttler.

=== Mumbai Indians ===
Mumbai Indians (also known as MI), are another rival team of GT. This is a relatively new rivalry, but they have clashed in 8 games so far. Out of these 8 games, GT have won 5 and MI have won 3 times. MI won the first match in 2022, but GT beat them 5 times after that, with a win for MI in between. GT and MI's main clashes were in 2023 and 2025. In 2023, MI won the Eliminator against Lucknow Super Giants, and GT lost the first qualifier against Chennai Super Kings, which meant they had to face off against MI in the second qualifier. The match was in Ahmedabad, Gujarat, so GT had a home court advantage and won by 62 runs. In 2025, The two teams faced off in the Eliminator, and the match was in Punjab, so no one had a home court advantage. GT had defeated MI in every game since the second qualifier in 2023, but MI won by 20 runs, and advanced to the second qualifier. That means MI have won the most recent match.

== Brand ==
The team anthem is 'Aava De'. It is written on the backside of the team's jersey. In the first IPL season, the song was sung by Aditya Gadhvi. The team's other anthem for the IPL 2024 season is 'GT Karshe'.

=== Kit suppliers and shirt sponsors ===
Period	Kit supplier	Shirt sponsor (front)	Shirt sponsor (back)
2022–2024	EM	Ather	BKT
2024–2025	EM	Dream11	BKT
2026–present	EM	Birla Estates	BKT
