= Satyajit Parab =

Indian cricketer (born 1975)

Personal information
- Full name: Satyajit Sudhir Parab
- Born: 1 September 1975 (age 51); Vadodara, Gujarat, India
- Batting: Right-handed
- Bowling: Right-arm off break
- Role: Team Manager, Gujarat Titans

Domestic team information
- Years: Team
- 1997–2009: Baroda

Career statistics
Competition	First-class	List A
Matches	84	35
Runs scored	4,782	1,134
Batting average	34.90	34.36
100s/50s	16/16	1/7
Top score	154	142
Balls bowled	281	76
Wickets	2	0
Bowling average	94.00	–
5 wickets in innings	0	0
10 wickets in match	0	n/a
Best bowling	1/6	–
Catches/stumpings	62/–	9/–
- Source: Cricinfo, 19 April 2020

Satyajit Sudhir Parab (born 1 September 1975 in Vadodara, Gujarat, India), is an Indian cricketer who played first-class and professional cricket for 14 years representing India A, Board President‘s XI, India Seniors, West Zone and Baroda.

Parab, primarily an opening, right-hand batsman, played 84 first-class matches and 35 List A matches. Over these matches, Parab accumulated over 6,000 runs including 17 centuries and 23 half-centuries. In 2000-01, when Baroda won the Ranji Trophy, Parab scored 809 runs at an average of 58, and followed that with 895 runs at 56 in 2002-03.

Parab now works in cricket operations and development and has worked with Baroda Cricket Association and Team India.

He is currently the Team Manager for Gujarat Titans.
