= Ashok Sharma =

Ashok Sharma may refer to:

- Ashok Sharma (actor) (born 1965), Nepalese film actor and director
- Ashok Sharma (politician) (born 1950), Indian politician from Rajasthan
- Ashok Sarma, Indian politician from Assam
- Dr. Ashok Sharma, fictional character in the 2019 Indian TV series Ek Bhram...Sarvagun Sampanna
- Ashok Sharma (cricketer) (born 2002), India cricketer.
