= Narender Negi =

Indian cricketer (born 1978)

Personal information
- Born: 12 February 1978 (age 48)
- Source: ESPNcricinfo, 10 April 2016

Narender Negi (born 12 February 1978) is an Indian former cricketer. He played first-class cricket for Delhi and Haryana between 2001 and 2004.

== See also ==
- List of Delhi cricketers
