= Ulhas Gandhe =

Indian cricketer (born 1974)

Personal information
- Born: 5 October 1974 (age 52); Nagpur, India

Umpiring information
- WODIs umpired: 7 (2013–2021)
- WT20Is umpired: 6 (2010–2021)
- Source: Cricinfo, 12 October 2015

Ulhas Gandhe (born 5 October 1974) is an Indian former first-class cricketer. He is now an umpire and has stood in matches in the 2015–16 Ranji Trophy.
