= Sai Sudharsan =

Indian cricketer (born 2001)

Personal information
- Born: 15 October 2001 (age 25); Chennai, Tamil Nadu, India
- Height: 1.83 m (6 ft 0 in)
- Batting: Left-handed
- Bowling: Right-arm leg break
- Role: Top-order batter

International information
- National side: India (2023–present)
- Test debut (cap 317): 20 June 2025 v England
- Last Test: 6 June 2026 v Afghanistan
- ODI debut (cap 253): 17 December 2023 v South Africa
- Last ODI: 21 December 2023 v South Africa
- ODI shirt no.: 66
- Only T20I (cap 114): 7 July 2024 v Zimbabwe
- T20I shirt no.: 66

Domestic team information
- Years: Team
- 2021/22–present: Tamil Nadu
- 2022–present: Gujarat Titans
- 2023–2024: Surrey

Career statistics
Competition	Test	ODI	FC	LA
Matches	7	3	42	30
Runs scored	383	127	3,004	1,495
Batting average	31.91	63.50	42.91	59.80
100s/50s	0/3	0/2	10/10	6/7
Top score	87	62	213	154
Balls bowled	–	3	120	21
Wickets	–	0	0	3
Bowling average	–	–	–	7.33
5 wickets in innings	–	–	–	–
10 wickets in match	–	–	–	–
Best bowling	–	–	–	1/0
Catches/stumpings	6/–	1/–	29/–	9/–
- Source: Cricinfo, 9 July 2026

Bhardwaj Sai Sudharsan (born 15 October 2001) is an Indian international cricketer. He plays in the India national team as a top order batter. He represents Tamil Nadu in domestic cricket and Gujarat Titans in the Indian Premier League.

== Early life ==
Sudharsan's father was an athlete who represented India at the South Asian Games in Dhaka, while his mother was a state level volleyball player. Sudharsan played for the Chennai Super Kings Youth Academy in 2018.

== Domestic career ==
In 2019/20 Raja of Palayampatti Shield, he was Alwarpet CC's leading run-scorer with 635 runs at an average of 52.92. He made his Twenty20 debut on 4 November 2021, for Tamil Nadu in the 2021–22 Syed Mushtaq Ali Trophy. He made his List A debut on 8 December 2021, for Tamil Nadu in the 2021–22 Vijay Hazare Trophy. In February 2022, he was bought by the Gujarat Titans in the auction for the 2022 Indian Premier League (IPL) tournament. Sudharsan's performance in the TNPL led to his selection in the IPL team.

In April 2022, he made his IPL debut after Vijay Shankar was ruled out of the match with an injury.

In the 2023 season of the IPL Sudharsan scored 362 runs in the tournament averaging 51.71. He scored 96 in the IPL final against Chennai Super Kings, but his team Gujarat Titans would go on to lose that match. In August 2023, Sudharsan signed for Surrey for the final three matches of the 2023 County Championship.

In the 2024 season of the IPL, Sudharsan finished of the season as the top run scorer for his team Gujarat Titans with 527 runs in the tournament averaging 47.90. His most notable innings was a magnificent century vs Chennai Super Kings in Match 59, where he hit 103(59) with 5 4s and 7 6s. In July 2024 he made his T20i debut vs Zimbabwe.

In the 2025 season of the IPL, Sudharsan won the Orange Cap award of most runs scored in that IPL season after amassing 759 runs, including six half-centuries and one century at an average of 54.21. In doing so, he became the youngest cricketer to win the award, as well as the youngest to cross 700 runs in a single IPL season.

Playing for Gujarat Titans, Sudarshan and his opening partner Shubman Gill became the first batting duo in men's T20 history to register 11 century partnerships.

== International career ==
Sai Sudharsan has played 3 One Day International games against South Africa in the 2023 ODI Series in December 2023. He scored 127 runs including 2 fifties with an average of 63.5. He was also part of the team in the 2nd T20I against Zimbabwe in 2024.

Sudharsan made his Test debut during the 1st Test of the England series in June 2025.
