= Jayant Yadav =

Indian cricketer

Personal information
- Full name: Jayant Yadav
- Born: 22 January 1990 (age 36); Delhi, India
- Batting: Right-handed
- Bowling: Right-arm off-break
- Role: Bowling All rounder

International information
- National side: India (2016–2022)
- Test debut (cap 286): 17 November 2016 v England
- Last Test: 4 March 2022 v Sri Lanka
- ODI debut (cap 216): 29 October 2016 v New Zealand
- Last ODI: 23 January 2022 v South Africa
- ODI shirt no.: 22

Domestic team information
- Years: Team
- 2011–present: Haryana
- 2015–2017: Delhi Daredevils (squad no. 19)
- 2019–2021: Mumbai Indians (squad no. 19)
- 2022: Gujarat Titans
- 2022: Warwickshire
- 2023: Middlesex

Career statistics
Competition	Test	ODI	FC	LA
Matches	6	2	95	72
Runs scored	248	3	3,138	1,114
Batting average	31.00	3.00	24.90	24.21
100s/50s	1/1	0/0	3/15	0/7
Top score	104	2	211	71
Balls bowled	825	84	16,406	3,372
Wickets	16	1	272	67
Bowling average	29.06	8.00	32.18	33.83
5 wickets in innings	0	0	15	0
10 wickets in match	0	–	2	0
Best bowling	4/49	1/8	7/58	3/21
Catches/stumpings	3/–	1/–	42/–	28/–
- Source: ESPNcricinfo, 21 December 2025

Jayant Yadav (born 22 January 1990) is an Indian cricketer from Delhi who plays for Haryana in India and Middlesex in England in domestic cricket.

He is an off spin bowler who bats right-handed. He made his international debut in October 2016.

== Domestic career ==
In the 2014 IPL auction, Jayant was bought by the Delhi Daredevils (now Delhi Capitals) for the base price of INR 10 Lakhs. He played for them till 2018. Delhi Capitals transferred him to Mumbai Indians ahead of the 2019 IPL season.

In August 2019, Jayant was named in the India Green team's squad for the 2019–20 Duleep Trophy. Jayant was part of Delhi Capitals squad in the Indian Premier League 2018 but did not play a single match. In February 2022, he was bought by the Gujarat Titans in the auction for the 2022 Indian Premier League tournament.

He joined Middlesex on 1 September 2023.

== International career ==
In September 2016, Jayant was added to India's Test squad for their series against New Zealand.

Jayant played for India against New Zealand at Vizag and took his first ODI wicket (Corey Anderson) in the same match. He got his ODI cap from Virender Sehwag. Three weeks later, he made his Test debut for India against England at the same venue. He took his maiden Test wicket in the first innings, dismissing Moeen Ali via Umpire Decision Review System. He became the 286th player to play Test cricket for India. Yadav played 42 first-class matches and picked up 117 wickets before he made his Test debut for India

In the first 3 tests that Jayant played, he scored one century and one half-century and had an average of over 73. He became the first batsman for India to score a century coming in at number 9. His partnership with Virat Kohli of 241 runs for 8th wicket is the second best 8th-wicket stand in the world.

In December 2018, Jayant was named as the captain of India's team for the 2018 ACC Emerging Teams Asia Cup.

== Personal life ==
On 19 November 2019, Jayant got engaged to his friend, Disha Chawla. Yuzvendra Chahal also attended their engagement.

Jayant is nephew of politician and psephologist Yogendra Yadav.
