= Rahul Tewatia =

Indian cricketer (born 1993)

Personal information
- Born: 20 May 1993 (age 33); Faridabad, Haryana, India
- Nickname: The Iceman
- Height: 1.75 m (5 ft 9 in)
- Batting: Left-handed
- Bowling: Right-arm leg break
- Role: Batting all-rounder

Domestic team information
- Years: Team
- 2013–present: Haryana
- 2014–2015, 2020-2021: Rajasthan Royals
- 2017: Kings XI Punjab
- 2018–2019: Delhi Capitals
- 2022–present: Gujarat Titans

Career statistics
Competition	FC	LA	T20
Matches	14	54	169
Runs scored	535	1,260	2,107
Batting average	28.15	42.00	26.01
100s/50s	1/2	0/9	0/3
Top score	144	99*	59*
Balls bowled	1,176	1,648	1,474
Wickets	32	59	69
Bowling average	21.96	22.62	26.34
5 wickets in innings	1	0	0
10 wickets in match	0	–	–
Best bowling	7/98	4/24	3/4
Catches/stumpings	15/–	25/–	68/–
- Source: ESPNcricinfo, 29 December 2025

Rahul Tewatia (born 20 May 1993) is an Indian cricketer who plays for Haryana in the domestic cricket and Gujarat Titans in Indian Premier League (IPL). He is an all-rounder who bats left handed and bowls right-arm leg spin. He received his maiden international call up to India's squad for their home T20I series against England in 2021.

== Domestic career ==
Tewatia made his debut for Haryana during the 2013–14 Ranji Trophy on 6 December 2013 against Karnataka at the Bansi Lal Cricket Stadium. He managed 17 runs total in his two appearances at bat. He made his List A debut for Haryana in the 2016–17 Vijay Hazare Trophy on 25 February 2017.

== Indian Premier League ==
Rahul Tewatia made his IPL debut for Rajasthan Royals in 2014. Before the 2014 Indian Premier League, the Rajasthan Royals bought Tewatia. He also made his T20 debut representing Rajasthan Royals in the 2014 IPL. In February 2017, he was bought by the Kings XI Punjab team for the 2017 Indian Premier League. In January 2018, he was bought by the Delhi Daredevils now Delhi Capitals in the 2018 IPL auction. During the 2019 Indian Premier League, he also set the joint record for taking the most catches (4) by a non-wicket keeper in an IPL innings. In November 2019, before the 2020 Indian Premier League, he was traded to the Rajasthan Royals.

Meanwhile, Tewatia came into the limelight when playing for the Rajasthan Royals in 2020. On 27 September 2020, he equalled Chris Gayle's record for hitting the most sixes in an over of an IPL match, when he hit 5 sixes off Sheldon Cottrell in the 18th over of the match against Kings XI Punjab. He scored 53 runs in 31 balls, helping his team to chase the target of 224 runs, which became the highest runs ever chased in the Indian Premier League till then.

In February 2022, he was bought by the Gujarat Titans in the auction for the 2022 Indian Premier League tournament. On April 8, 2022, during a match against the Punjab Kings, he hit consecutive sixes on the final two balls of the match, leading the Gujarat Titans to their third victory.

== International career ==
In February 2021, he was named in India's Twenty20 International (T20I) squad for their series against England.
