= 2026 Punjab Kings season =

Indian Premier League cricket team

Punjab Kings
2026 season
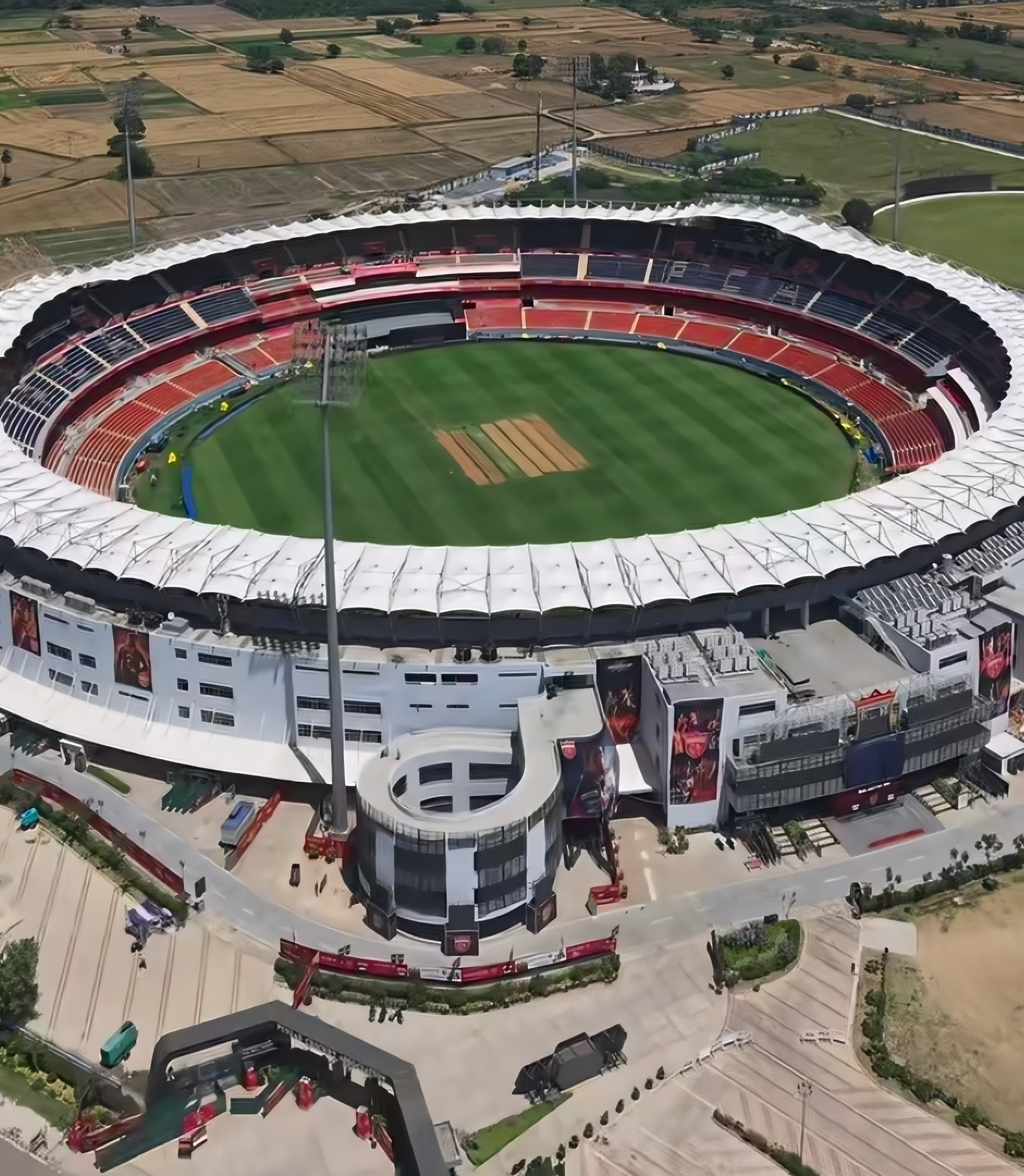
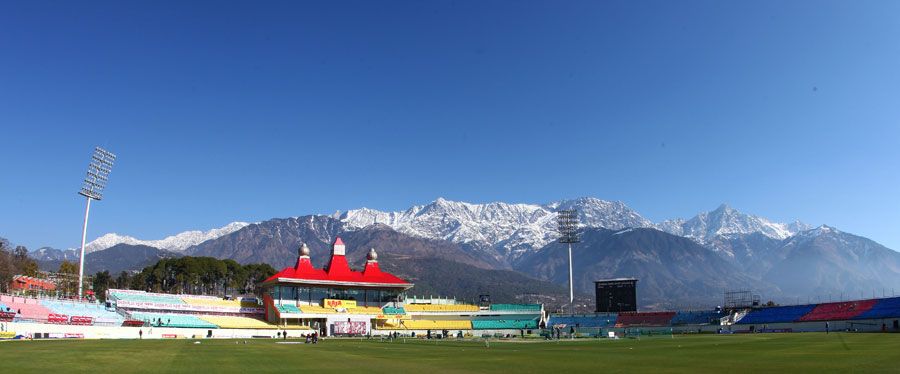
- Maharaja Yadavindra Singh Stadium and HPCA Cricket Stadium, home grounds of Punjab Kings
- Coach: Ricky Ponting
- Captain: Shreyas Iyer
- Ground(s): Maharaja Yadavindra Singh Stadium, Mullanpur; HPCA Cricket Stadium, Dharamshala
- League stage: 5th place
- Most runs: Prabhsimran Singh (510)
- Most wickets: Arshdeep Singh (14)
- Most catches: Xavier Bartlett (10)
- Most wicket-keeping dismissals: Prabhsimran Singh (8)

The 2026 season was Punjab Kings' nineteenth appearance in the Indian Premier League (IPL). They were one of the ten cricket teams that competed in the 2026 IPL. The team was captained by Shreyas Iyer and coached by Ricky Ponting.

Punjab Kings were one of the last teams to be eliminated from the 2026 IPL and finished the season in fifth place with seven wins from 14 matches. Prabhsimran Singh scored the most runs (510) while Arshdeep Singh took the most wickets (14) for Punjab in the 2026 season.

== Pre-season ==
The 2026 Indian Premier League was the 19th edition of the Indian Premier League (IPL), a professional Twenty20 (T20) cricket league held in India, organised by the Board of Control for Cricket in India (BCCI). Punjab Kings are one of the three active franchises not to have won the IPL title prior to 2026. They were the runners-up in the previous season. The tournament featured ten teams competing in 74 matches from 28 March to 31 May 2026. Punjab played most of their home matches at Maharaja Yadavindra Singh Stadium with three matches played at HPCA Cricket Stadium.

=== Player retention ===
Franchises were allowed to retain any number of players from their squad, except for the players signed as temporary replacements after the 2025 season's suspension and rescheduling who were not available for retention. Franchises were required to submit their retention lists before 15 November 2025. Punjab retained 21 players, including captain Shreyas Iyer.

Retained players
Domestic		Overseas
Priyansh Arya; Pyla Avinash; Harpreet Brar; Yuzvendra Chahal; Shreyas Iyer; Musheer Khan; Harnoor Singh; Suryansh Shedge	Arshdeep Singh; Shashank Singh; Prabhsimran Singh; Yash Thakur; Vishnu Vinod; Vijaykumar Vyshak; Nehal Wadhera	Xavier Bartlett; Marcus Stoinis; Marco Jansen; Mitchell Owen; Azmatullah Omarzai; Lockie Ferguson

Released players
Batters	Wicket-keepers	All-rounders	Bowlers
—N/a	Josh Inglis	Aaron Hardie; Glenn Maxwell	Praveen Dubey; Kuldeep Sen

=== Auction ===
The season's auction took place on 16 December 2025 in Abu Dhabi, United Arab Emirates. The auction purse for each franchise was set at ₹125 crore (US$13 million), with franchises being deducted an amount from the purse for every retained player. Punjab had a purse remaining of ₹11.50 crore (US$1.2 million). Punjab bought four players in the auction, including two capped overseas players.

Auctioned players
Domestic		Overseas	
Capped	Uncapped	Capped	Uncapped
—N/a	Praveen Dubey; Vishal Nishad	Ben Dwarshuis; Cooper Connolly	—N/a

== Squad ==
- Players with international caps as of start of 2026 IPL are listed in **bold**.
- Ages are as of 28 March 2026.

Punjab Kings squad for the 2026 Indian Premier League
S/N	Name	Nationality	Birth date	Batting style	Bowling style	Salary	Notes
2	**Arshdeep Singh**	India	5 February 1999 (aged 27)	Left-handed	Left-arm medium-fast	₹18 crore (US$1.9 million)	
3	**Yuzvendra Chahal**	India	23 July 1990 (aged 35)	Right-handed	Right-arm leg break	₹18 crore (US$1.9 million)	
4	Vishnu Vinod	India	2 December 1993 (aged 32)	Right-handed	—N/a	₹95 lakh (US$99,000)	
5	Suryansh Shedge	India	29 January 2003 (aged 23)	Right-handed	Right-arm medium-fast	₹30 lakh (US$31,000)	
8	**Cooper Connolly**	Australia	22 August 2003 (aged 22)	Left-handed	Left-arm orthodox	₹3 crore (US$310,000)	Overseas
9	**Azmatullah Omarzai**	Afghanistan	24 March 2000 (aged 26)	Right-handed	Right-arm medium-fast	₹2.4 crore (US$250,000)	Overseas
13	Harpreet Brar	India	16 September 1995 (aged 30)	Left-handed	Left-arm orthodox	₹1.5 crore (US$160,000)	
15	**Xavier Bartlett**	Australia	17 December 1998 (aged 27)	Right-handed	Right-arm fast	₹80 lakh (US$83,000)	Overseas
16	**Mitchell Owen**	Australia	11 September 2001 (aged 24)	Right-handed	Right-arm medium	₹3 crore (US$310,000)	Overseas
17	**Marcus Stoinis**	Australia	16 August 1989 (aged 36)	Right-handed	Right-arm medium-fast	₹11 crore (US$1.1 million)	Overseas
18	Priyansh Arya	India	18 January 2001 (aged 25)	Left-handed	Right-arm off break	₹3.8 crore (US$390,000)	
19	Nehal Wadhera	India	4 September 2000 (aged 25)	Left-handed	Right-arm leg break	₹4.2 crore (US$440,000)	
25	Praveen Dubey	India	1 July 1993 (aged 32)	Right-handed	Right-arm leg break	₹30 lakh (US$31,000)	
27	Shashank Singh	India	21 November 1991 (aged 34)	Right-handed	Right-arm medium-fast	₹5.5 crore (US$570,000)	
28	Yash Thakur	India	28 December 1998 (aged 27)	Right-handed	Right-arm medium-fast	₹1.6 crore (US$170,000)	
30	Vishal Nishad	India	1 April 2005 (aged 20)	Right-handed	Right-arm leg break	₹30 lakh (US$31,000)	
31	Vijaykumar Vyshak	India	31 January 1997 (aged 29)	Right-handed	Right-arm medium-fast	₹1.8 crore (US$190,000)	
69	**Lockie Ferguson**	New Zealand	13 June 1991 (aged 34)	Right-handed	Right-arm medium-fast	₹2 crore (US$210,000)	Overseas
70	**Marco Jansen**	South Africa	1 May 2000 (aged 25)	Right-handed	Left-arm medium-fast	₹7 crore (US$730,000)	Overseas
84	Prabhsimran Singh	India	10 August 2000 (aged 25)	Right-handed	—N/a	₹4 crore (US$420,000)	
96	**Shreyas Iyer**	India	6 December 1994 (aged 31)	Right-handed	Right-arm leg break	₹26.75 crore (US$2.8 million)	Captain
97	Musheer Khan	India	27 February 2005 (aged 21)	Right-handed	Left-arm orthodox	₹30 lakh (US$31,000)	
—N/a	Pyla Avinash	India	7 July 2000 (aged 25)	Right-handed	Right-arm medium-fast	₹30 lakh (US$31,000)	
—N/a	**Ben Dwarshuis**	Australia	23 June 1994 (aged 31)	Left-handed	Left-arm fast-medium	₹4.4 crore (US$460,000)	Overseas
—N/a	Harnoor Singh	India	30 January 2003 (aged 23)	Left-handed	Right-arm leg break	₹30 lakh (US$31,000)	

== Support staff ==
Sairaj Bahutule replaced Sunil Joshi as a bowling coach.

Position	Name
Head coach	Ricky Ponting
Assistant coach	Brad Haddin
Bowling coach	James Hopes; Sairaj Bahutule

- Source: News18

== League stage ==
Punjab Kings began their season with two wins against Gujarat Titans and Chennai Super Kings. Their third match against Kolkata Knight Riders was abandoned due to rain. They won their next four matches against Sunrisers Hyderabad, Mumbai Indians, Lucknow Super Giants and Delhi Capitals. However, they lost their next six matches to Rajasthan Royals, Gujarat, Hyderabad, Delhi, Mumbai and Royal Challengers Bengaluru. They won their last game of the season against Lucknow to finish the league stage in fifth place with fifteen points and were eliminated.

=== Points table ===
League stage standings
Pos	Grp	Team	Pld	W	L	NR	Pts	NRR	Qualification
1	A	Royal Challengers Bengaluru (C)	14	9	5	0	18	0.783	Advanced to Qualifier 1
2	B	Gujarat Titans (R)	14	9	5	0	18	0.695	Advanced to Qualifier 1
3	B	Sunrisers Hyderabad (4th)	14	9	5	0	18	0.524	Advanced to Eliminator
4	A	Rajasthan Royals (3rd)	14	8	6	0	16	0.189	Advanced to Eliminator
5	A	Punjab Kings	14	7	6	1	15	0.309	Eliminated
6	B	Delhi Capitals	14	7	7	0	14	−0.651	Eliminated
7	A	Kolkata Knight Riders	14	6	7	1	13	−0.147	Eliminated
8	A	Chennai Super Kings	14	6	8	0	12	−0.345	Eliminated
9	B	Mumbai Indians	14	4	10	0	8	−0.584	Eliminated
10	B	Lucknow Super Giants	14	4	10	0	8	−0.740	Eliminated

Source: ESPNcricinfo
Rules for classification: 1) Points; 2) Wins; 3) Net run rate; 4) Wickets taken per fair deliveries; 5) drawing lots
(C) Champions; (R) Runners-up

=== League progression ===
League progression
Team	Group matches														Playoffs		
Team	1	2	3	4	5	6	7	8	9	10	11	12	13	14	Q1/E	Q2	F
Punjab Kings	2	4	5	7	9	11	13	13	13	13	13	13	13	15			

Win	Loss	No result

- Note: The total points at the end of each group match are listed.
- Note: Click on the points (group matches) or W/L (playoffs) to see the match summary.

=== Fixtures ===
Match 4
31 March 2026
19:30 (N)
Scorecard

Gujarat Titans; 162/6 (20 overs)	v	Punjab Kings (H); 165/7 (19.1 overs)
Shubman Gill 39 (27); Vijaykumar Vyshak 3/34 (4 overs)		Cooper Connolly 72* (44); Prasidh Krishna 3/29 (4 overs)

Punjab Kings won by 3 wickets
Maharaja Yadavindra Singh Stadium, Mullanpur
Umpires: Abhijit Bhattacharya (Ind) and Akshay Totre (Ind)
Player of the match: Cooper Connolly (Punjab Kings)

- Punjab Kings won the toss and elected to field.
- Cooper Connolly (Punjab Kings) and Ashok Sharma (Gujarat Titans) both made their IPL debuts.

Match 7
3 April 2026
19:30 (N)
Scorecard

Chennai Super Kings (H); 209/5 (20 overs)	v	Punjab Kings; 210/5 (18.4 overs)
Ayush Mhatre 73 (43); Vijaykumar Vyshak 2/38 (4 overs)		Shreyas Iyer 50 (29); Anshul Kamboj 2/43 (3.4 overs)

Punjab Kings won by 5 wickets
M. A. Chidambaram Stadium, Chennai
Umpires: Abhijit Bhattacharya (Ind) and Akshay Totre (Ind)
Player of the match: Priyansh Arya (Punjab Kings)

- Punjab Kings won the toss and elected to field.

Match 12
6 April 2026
19:30 (N)
Scorecard

Kolkata Knight Riders (H); 25/2 (3.4 overs)	v	Punjab Kings
Ajinkya Rahane 8* (6); Xavier Bartlett 2/9 (1.4 overs)

No result
Eden Gardens, Kolkata
Umpires: Abhijeet Bengeri (Ind) and Jayaraman Madanagopal (Ind)

- Kolkata Knight Riders won the toss and elected to bat.
- No further play was possible due to rain.

Match 17
11 April 2026
15:30 (D/N)
Scorecard

Sunrisers Hyderabad; 219/6 (20 overs)	v	Punjab Kings (H); 223/4 (18.5 overs)
Abhishek Sharma 74 (28); Shashank Singh 2/20 (3 overs)		Shreyas Iyer 69* (33); Shivang Kumar 3/33 (4 overs)

Punjab Kings won by 6 wickets
Maharaja Yadavindra Singh Stadium, Mullanpur
Umpires: Abhijeet Bengeri (Ind) and Rohan Pandit (Ind)
Player of the match: Shreyas Iyer (Punjab Kings)

- Punjab Kings won the toss and elected to field.

Match 24
16 April 2026
19:30 (N)
Scorecard

Mumbai Indians (H); 195/6 (20 overs)	v	Punjab Kings; 198/3 (16.3 overs)
Quinton de Kock 112* (60); Arshdeep Singh 3/22 (4 overs)		Prabhsimran Singh 80* (39); Allah Ghazanfar 2/31 (4 overs)

Punjab Kings won by 7 wickets
Wankhede Stadium, Mumbai
Umpires: Mohit Krishnadas (Ind) and Virender Sharma (Ind)
Player of the match: Arshdeep Singh (Punjab Kings)

- Punjab Kings won the toss and elected to field.

Match 29
19 April 2026
19:30 (N)
Scorecard

Punjab Kings (H); 254/7 (20 overs)	v	Lucknow Super Giants; 200/5 (20 overs)
Priyansh Arya 93 (37); Prince Yadav 2/25 (4 overs)		Rishabh Pant 43 (23); Marco Jansen 2/36 (4 overs)

Punjab Kings won by 54 runs
Maharaja Yadavindra Singh Stadium, Mullanpur
Umpires: Keyur Kelkar (Ind) and Jayaraman Madanagopal (Ind)
Player of the match: Priyansh Arya (Punjab Kings)

- Lucknow Super Giants won the toss and elected to field.

Match 35
25 April 2026
15:30 (D/N)
Scorecard

Delhi Capitals (H); 264/2 (20 overs)	v	Punjab Kings; 265/4 (18.5 overs)
KL Rahul 152* (67); Arshdeep Singh 1/49 (4 overs)		Prabhsimran Singh 76 (26); Kuldeep Yadav 2/46 (4 overs)

Punjab Kings won by 6 wickets
Arun Jaitley Stadium, Delhi
Umpires: Ajitesh Argal (Ind) and Virender Sharma (Ind)
Player of the match: KL Rahul (Delhi Capitals)

- Delhi Capitals won the toss and elected to bat.
- KL Rahul (Delhi Capitals) scored the highest individual score by an Indian player in the history of IPL.

Match 40
28 April 2026
19:30 (N)
Scorecard

Punjab Kings (H); 222/4 (20 overs)	v	Rajasthan Royals; 228/4 (19.2 overs)
Marcus Stoinis 62* (22); Yash Raj Punja 2/41 (4 overs)		Donovan Ferreira 52* (26); Yuzvendra Chahal 3/36 (4 overs)

Rajasthan Royals won by 6 wickets
Maharaja Yadavindra Singh Stadium, Mullanpur
Umpires: Nitin Menon (Ind) and Tanmay Srivastava (Ind)
Player of the match: Donovan Ferreira (Rajasthan Royals)

- Rajasthan Royals won the toss and elected to field.

Match 46
3 May 2026
19:30 (N)
Scorecard

Punjab Kings; 163/9 (20 overs)	v	Gujarat Titans (H); 167/6 (19.5 overs)
Suryansh Shedge 57 (29); Jason Holder 4/24 (4 overs)		Sai Sudharsan 57 (41); Arshdeep Singh 2/24 (4 overs)

Gujarat Titans won by 4 wickets
Narendra Modi Stadium, Ahmedabad
Umpires: K. N. Ananthapadmanabhan (Ind) and Parashar Joshi (Ind)
Player of the match: Jason Holder (Gujarat Titans)

- Gujarat Titans won the toss and elected to field.
- Nishant Sindhu (Gujarat Titans) made his IPL debut.

Match 49
6 May 2026
19:30 (N)
Scorecard

Sunrisers Hyderabad (H); 235/4 (20 overs)	v	Punjab Kings; 202/7 (20 overs)
Heinrich Klaasen 69 (43); Yuzvendra Chahal 1/32 (4 overs)		Cooper Connolly 107* (59); Pat Cummins 2/34 (4 overs)

Sunrisers Hyderabad won by 33 runs
Rajiv Gandhi Stadium, Hyderabad
Umpires: Keyur Kelkar (Ind) and Jayaraman Madanagopal (Ind)
Player of the match: Pat Cummins (Sunrisers Hyderabad)

- Punjab Kings won the toss and elected to field.
- Cooper Connolly (Punjab Kings) scored his maiden century in IPL.

Match 55
11 May 2026
19:30 (N)
Scorecard

Punjab Kings (H); 210/5 (20 overs)	v	Delhi Capitals; 216/7 (19 overs)
Shreyas Iyer 59* (36); Madhav Tiwari 2/40 (4 overs)		Axar Patel 56 (30); Arshdeep Singh 2/21 (4 overs)

Delhi Capitals won by 3 wickets
HPCA Cricket Stadium, Dharamshala
Umpires: K. N. Ananthapadmanabhan (Ind) and Bhavesh Patel (Ind)
Player of the match: Madhav Tiwari (Delhi Capitals)

- Delhi Capitals won the toss and elected to field.
- Ben Dwarshuis (Punjab Kings) made his IPL debut.

Match 58
14 May 2026
19:30 (N)
Scorecard

Punjab Kings (H); 200/8 (20 overs)	v	Mumbai Indians; 205/4 (19.5 overs)
Prabhsimran Singh 57 (32); Shardul Thakur 4/39 (4 overs)		Tilak Varma 75* (33); Azmatullah Omarzai 2/36 (4 overs)

Mumbai Indians won by 6 wickets
HPCA Cricket Stadium, Dharamshala
Umpires: K. N. Ananthapadmanabhan (Ind) and Bhavesh Patel (Ind)
Player of the match: Tilak Varma (Mumbai Indians)

- Mumbai Indians won the toss and elected to field.

Match 61
17 May 2026
15:30 (N)
Scorecard

Royal Challengers Bengaluru; 222/4 (20 overs)	v	Punjab Kings (H); 199/8 (20 overs)
Venkatesh Iyer 73* (40); Harpreet Brar 2/35 (4 overs)		Shashank Singh 56 (27); Rasikh Salam 3/36 (4 overs)

Royal Challengers Bengaluru won by 23 runs
HPCA Cricket Stadium, Dharamshala
Umpires: K. N. Ananthapadmanabhan (Ind) and Adrian Holdstock (SA)
Player of the match: Venkatesh Iyer (Royal Challengers Bengaluru)

- Punjab Kings won the toss and elected to field.
- Shreyas Iyer (Punjab Kings) played in his 100th IPL match as a captain.
- Royal Challengers Bengaluru qualified for the playoffs as a result of this match.

Match 68
23 May 2026
19:30 (N)
Scorecard

Lucknow Super Giants (H); 196/6 (20 overs)	v	Punjab Kings; 200/3 (18 overs)
Josh Inglis 72 (44); Yuzvendra Chahal 2/25 (4 overs)		Shreyas Iyer 101* (51); Mohammed Shami 2/45 (4 overs)

Punjab Kings won by 7 wickets
Ekana Cricket Stadium, Lucknow
Umpires: Kaushik Gandhi (Ind) and Vinod Seshan (Ind)
Player of the match: Shreyas Iyer (Punjab Kings)

- Punjab Kings won the toss and elected to field.
- Shreyas Iyer (Punjab Kings) scored his 7,000th run in T20s and his maiden century in IPL.
- Delhi Capitals were eliminated as a result of this match.

== Statistics ==
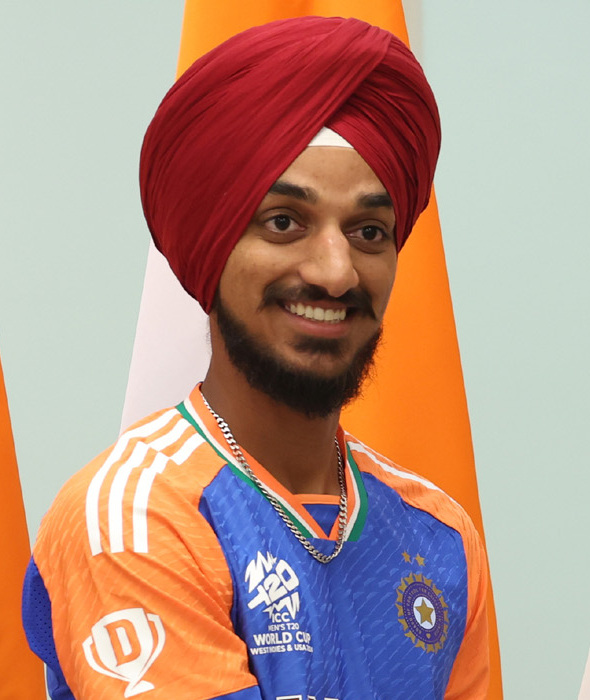
Arshdeep Singh took the most wickets (14) for Punjab Kings in the 2026 Indian Premier League.

At the IPL end of season awards, Punjab were awarded the team fairplay award.

Most runs
Runs	Player
510	Prabhsimran Singh
498	Shreyas Iyer
491	Cooper Connolly
364	Priyansh Arya
216	Marcus Stoinis

Most wickets
Wickets	Player
14	Arshdeep Singh
12	Yuzvendra Chahal
9	Marco Jansen
9	Vijaykumar Vyshak
5	Xavier Bartlett
