= 2026 Rajasthan Royals season =

Indian Premier League cricket team

Rajasthan Royals
2026 season
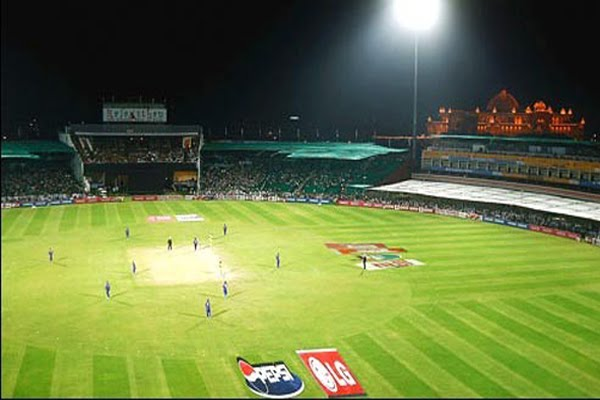
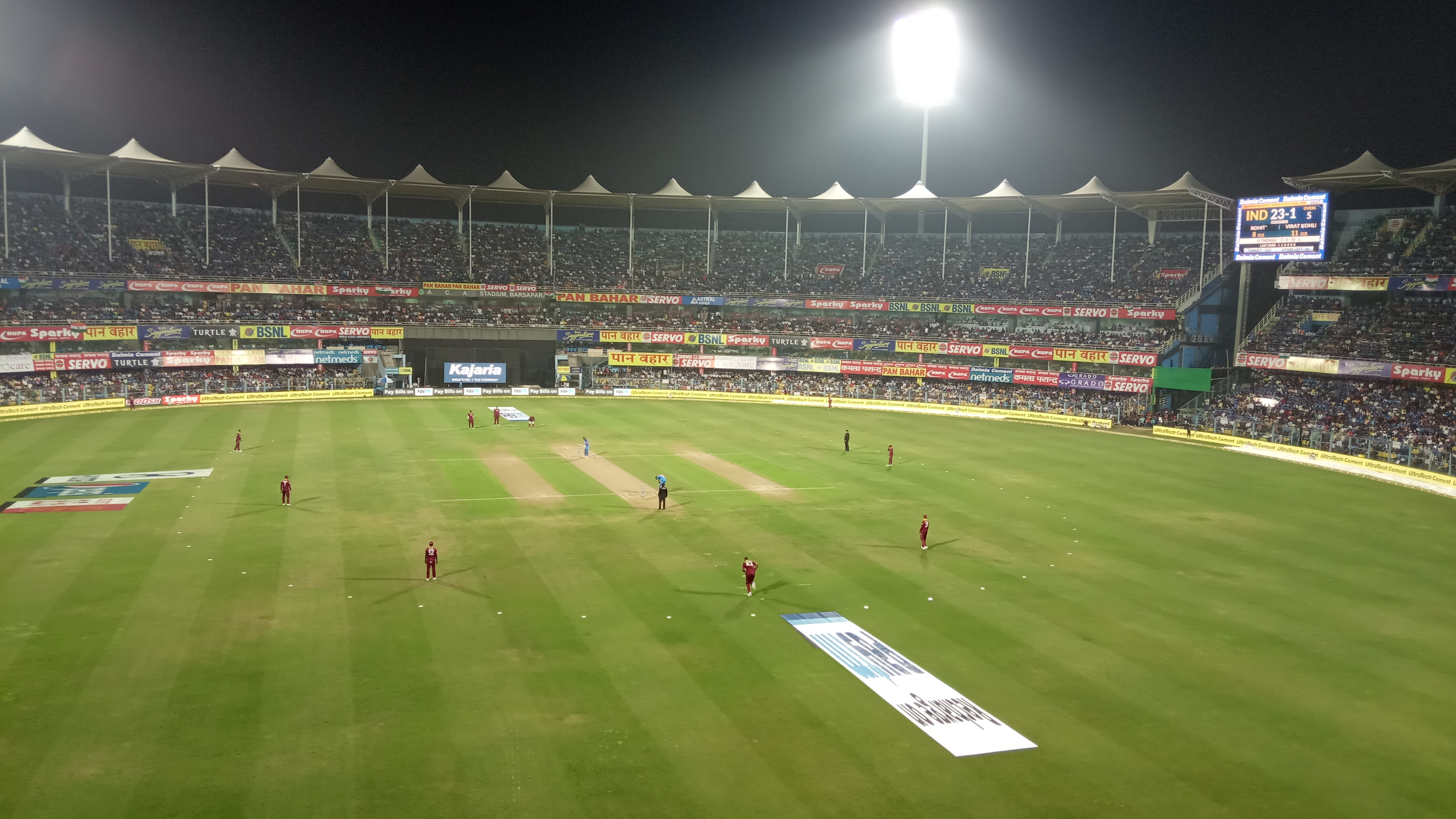
- Sawai Mansingh Stadium and ACA Cricket Stadium, home grounds of Rajasthan Royals
- Coach: Kumar Sangakkara
- Captain: Riyan Parag
- Ground(s): Sawai Mansingh Stadium, Jaipur; ACA Cricket Stadium, Guwahati
- League stage: 4th place
- Eliminator: Won against Sunrisers Hyderabad
- Qualifier 2: Lost to Gujarat Titans
- Most runs: Vaibhav Sooryavanshi (776)
- Most wickets: Jofra Archer (25)
- Most catches: Donovan Ferreira (13)
- Most wicket-keeping dismissals: Dhruv Jurel (19)

The 2026 season was Rajasthan Royals' seventeenth appearance in the Indian Premier League (IPL). They were one of the ten cricket teams that competed in the 2026 IPL. The team was captained by Riyan Parag and coached by Kumar Sangakkara.

Rajasthan Royals finished in fourth place in the league stage, and advanced to Eliminator in the playoffs. The team won Eliminator against Sunrisers Hyderabad but lost Qualifier 2 to Gujarat Titans. Vaibhav Sooryavanshi scored the most runs (776), which were the most by any batter in the tournament, while Jofra Archer took the most wickets (25) for Rajasthan in the 2026 season.

== Pre-season ==
The 2026 Indian Premier League was the 19th edition of the Indian Premier League (IPL), a professional Twenty20 (T20) cricket league held in India, organised by the Board of Control for Cricket in India. Rajasthan Royals had previously won the title once in the 2008 inaugural IPL. The team finished in ninth place in the previous season. The tournament featured ten teams competing in 74 matches from 28 March to 31 May 2026. Rajasthan played most of their home matches at Sawai Mansingh Stadium with two matches played at ACA Cricket Stadium.

=== Player retention ===
Franchises were allowed to retain any number of players from their squad, including traded players while excluding players signed as temporary replacements. Franchises were required to submit their retention lists before 15 November 2025. Rajasthan retained sixteen players, but did not retain their prior captain Sanju Samson whom they traded to Chennai Super Kings in return for Ravindra Jadeja and Sam Curran. Rajsthan also traded Nitish Rana to Delhi Capitals in return for Donovan Ferreira.

Retained players
| Domestic | | Overseas |
|---|---|---|
| Tushar Deshpande; Shubham Dubey; Yashasvi Jaiswal; Ravindra Jadeja (Note: Rajasthan Royals traded Sanju Samson to Chennai Super Kings in return for Ravindra Jadeja and Sam Curran.); Dhruv Jurel | Riyan Parag; Lhuan-dre Pretorius; Sandeep Sharma; Yudhvir Singh; Vaibhav Sooryavanshi | Jofra Archer; Nandre Burger; Sam Curran; Donovan Ferreira (Note: Rajasthan Royals traded Nitish Rana to Delhi Capitals in return for Donovan Ferreira.); Shimron Hetmyer; Kwena Maphaka |

Released players
| Batters | Wicket-keepers | All-rounders | Bowlers |
|---|---|---|---|
| Nitish Rana | Sanju Samson; Kunal Singh Rathore | Wanindu Hasaranga | Fazalhaq Farooqi; Kumar Kartikeya; Akash Madhwal; Ashok Sharma; Maheesh Theekshana |

=== Auction ===
The season's auction took place on 16 December 2025 in Abu Dhabi, United Arab Emirates. The auction purse for each franchise was set at ₹125 crore (US$13 million), with franchises being deducted an amount from the purse for every retained player. Rajasthan had a purse remaining of ₹16.05 crore (US$1.7 million). Rajasthan bought nine players in the auction, including three capped players and one overseas player.

Auctioned players
| Domestic | | Overseas | |
| Capped | Uncapped | Capped | Uncapped |
|---|---|---|---|
| Ravi Bishnoi; Kuldeep Sen | Sushant Mishra; Yash Raj Punja; Vignesh Puthur; Aman Rao; Ravi Singh; Brijesh Sharma | Adam Milne | —N/a |

== Squad ==
- Players with international caps as of the start of 2026 IPL are listed in **bold**.
- Ages are as of 28 March 2026.
- Withdrawn players are indicated by a dagger symbol (†) and placed at the bottom of the table.

Rajasthan Royals squad for the 2026 Indian Premier League
| S/N | Name | Nationality | Birth date | Batting style | Bowling style | Salary | Notes |
|---|---|---|---|---|---|---|---|
| 2 | **Donovan Ferreira** | South Africa | 21 July 1998 (aged 27) | Right-handed | Right-arm off break | ₹1 crore (US$110,000) | Overseas |
| 4 | Vignesh Puthur | India | 2 March 2001 (aged 25) | Left-handed | Left-arm unorthodox | ₹30 lakh (US$32,000) | |
| 5 | **Riyan Parag** | India | 10 November 2001 (aged 24) | Right-handed | Right-arm leg break | ₹14 crore (US$1.5 million) | Captain |
| 6 | Lhuan-dre Pretorius | South Africa | 28 March 2006 (aged 20) | Left-handed | —N/a | ₹30 lakh (US$32,000) | Overseas |
| 7 | **Dasun Shanaka** | Sri Lanka | 9 September 1991 (aged 34) | Right-handed | Right-arm medium | ₹2 crore (US$210,000) | Overseas; replacement (Note: Dasun Shanaka replaced Sam Curran, after the latter withdrew due to groin injury.) |
| 8 | **Ravindra Jadeja** | India | 6 December 1988 (aged 37) | Left-handed | Left-arm orthodox | ₹14 crore (US$1.5 million) | |
| 11 | **Kwena Maphaka** | South Africa | 8 April 2006 (aged 19) | Left-handed | Left-arm medium-fast | ₹1.5 crore (US$160,000) | Overseas |
| 12 | Vaibhav Sooryavanshi | India | 27 March 2011 (aged 15) | Left-handed | Left-arm orthodox | ₹1.1 crore (US$120,000) | |
| 14 | Yash Raj Punja | India | 26 June 2006 (aged 19) | Right-handed | Right-arm medium | ₹90 lakh (US$96,000) | |
| 16 | Brijesh Sharma | India | 16 December 1998 (aged 27) | Right-handed | Right-arm medium | ₹30 lakh (US$32,000) | |
| 17 | **Nandre Burger** | South Africa | 11 August 1995 (aged 30) | Left-handed | Left-arm fast-medium | ₹3.5 crore (US$370,000) | Overseas |
| 18 | **Kuldeep Sen** | India | 22 October 1996 (aged 29) | Right-handed | Right-arm medium-fast | ₹75 lakh (US$80,000) | |
| 20 | **Sandeep Sharma** | India | 18 May 1993 (aged 32) | Right-handed | Right-arm medium-fast | ₹4 crore (US$430,000) | |
| 21 | **Dhruv Jurel** | India | 21 January 2001 (aged 25) | Right-handed | Right-arm medium-fast | ₹14 crore (US$1.5 million) | |
| 22 | **Jofra Archer** | England | 1 April 1995 (aged 30) | Right-handed | Right-arm fast | ₹12.5 crore (US$1.3 million) | Overseas |
| 23 | **Adam Milne** | New Zealand | 13 April 1992 (aged 33) | Right-handed | Right-arm fast | ₹2.4 crore (US$260,000) | Overseas |
| 24 | **Tushar Deshpande** | India | 15 May 1995 (aged 30) | Left-handed | Right-arm medium-fast | ₹6.5 crore (US$690,000) | |
| 27 | Shubham Dubey | India | 27 August 1994 (aged 31) | Left-handed | Right-arm off break | ₹80 lakh (US$85,000) | |
| 34 | Yudhvir Singh | India | 13 September 1997 (aged 28) | Right-handed | Right-arm medium-fast | ₹35 lakh (US$37,000) | |
| 51 | Sushant Mishra | India | 23 December 2000 (aged 25) | Left-handed | Left-arm medium fast | ₹30 lakh (US$32,000) | |
| 56 | **Ravi Bishnoi** | India | 5 September 2000 (aged 25) | Right-handed | Right-arm leg break | ₹7.2 crore (US$770,000) | |
| 64 | **Yashasvi Jaiswal** | India | 28 December 2001 (aged 24) | Left-handed | Right-arm leg break | ₹18 crore (US$1.9 million) | Stand-in captain (Note: Yashasvi Jaiswal captained Rajasthan Royals against Gujarat Titans when Riyan Parag was unavailable.) |
| 189 | **Shimron Hetmyer** | West Indies | 26 December 1996 (aged 29) | Left-handed | Right-arm leg break | ₹11 crore (US$1.2 million) | Overseas |
| —N/a | Emanjot Chahal | India | 17 August 2004 (aged 21) | Right-handed | Left-arm orthodox | ₹30 lakh (US$32,000) | Replacement (Note: Emanjot Chahal replaced Ravi Singh, after the latter withdrew due to hamstring injury.) |
| —N/a | Aman Rao | India | 2 June 2004 (aged 21) | Right-handed | —N/a | ₹30 lakh (US$32,000) | |
| 58 | **Sam Curran** † | England | 3 June 1998 (aged 27) | Left-handed | Left-arm fast-medium | ₹2.4 crore (US$260,000) | Overseas; withdrawn |
| 88 | Ravi Singh † | India | 25 May 2001 (aged 24) | Left-handed | Left-arm leg break | ₹95 lakh (US$100,000) | Withdrawn |

== Support staff ==
In September 2025, it was announced that Kumar Sangakkara would return as Rajasthan's head coach replacing Rahul Dravid, while Shane Bond would replace Sairaj Bahutule as bowling coach and Trevor Penney would join as an assistant coach.

| Position | Name |
|---|---|
| Head coach | Kumar Sangakkara |
| Assistant coach | Trevor Penney |
| Batting coach | Vikram Rathour |
| Bowling coach | Shane Bond |

- Source: News18

== League stage ==
Rajasthan Royals began their season with four consecutive wins against Chennai, Gujarat Titans, Mumbai Indians and Royal Challengers Bengaluru. They lost their next two matches to Sunrisers Hyderabad and Kolkata Knight Riders, won against Lucknow Super Giants, lost to Hyderabad and won against Punjab Kings. The lost their next three matches to Delhi, Gujarat and Delhi but won their last two matches against Lucknow and Mumbai to finish the league stage in fourth place with eight wins from 14 matches, and advanced to Eliminator in the playoffs.

=== Points table ===
League stage standings
| Pos | Grp | Team | Pld | W | L | NR | Pts | NRR | Qualification |
|---|---|---|---|---|---|---|---|---|---|
| 1 | A | Royal Challengers Bengaluru (C) | 14 | 9 | 5 | 0 | 18 | 0.783 | Advanced to Qualifier 1 |
| 2 | B | Gujarat Titans (R) | 14 | 9 | 5 | 0 | 18 | 0.695 | Advanced to Qualifier 1 |
| 3 | B | Sunrisers Hyderabad (4th) | 14 | 9 | 5 | 0 | 18 | 0.524 | Advanced to Eliminator |
| 4 | A | Rajasthan Royals (3rd) | 14 | 8 | 6 | 0 | 16 | 0.189 | Advanced to Eliminator |
| 5 | A | Punjab Kings | 14 | 7 | 6 | 1 | 15 | 0.309 | Eliminated |
| 6 | B | Delhi Capitals | 14 | 7 | 7 | 0 | 14 | −0.651 | Eliminated |
| 7 | A | Kolkata Knight Riders | 14 | 6 | 7 | 1 | 13 | −0.147 | Eliminated |
| 8 | A | Chennai Super Kings | 14 | 6 | 8 | 0 | 12 | −0.345 | Eliminated |
| 9 | B | Mumbai Indians | 14 | 4 | 10 | 0 | 8 | −0.584 | Eliminated |
| 10 | B | Lucknow Super Giants | 14 | 4 | 10 | 0 | 8 | −0.740 | Eliminated |

Source: ESPNcricinfo
Rules for classification: 1) Points; 2) Wins; 3) Net run rate; 4) Wickets taken per fair deliveries; 5) drawing lots
(C) Champions; (R) Runners-up

=== League progression ===
League progression
| Team | Group matches | | | | | | | | | | | | | | Playoffs | | |
| Team | 1 | 2 | 3 | 4 | 5 | 6 | 7 | 8 | 9 | 10 | 11 | 12 | 13 | 14 | Q1/E | Q2 | F |
|---|---|---|---|---|---|---|---|---|---|---|---|---|---|---|---|---|---|
| Rajasthan Royals | 2 | 4 | 6 | 8 | 8 | 8 | 10 | 10 | 12 | 12 | 12 | 12 | 14 | 16 | W | L | |

| Win | Loss | No result |

- Note: The total points at the end of each group match are listed.
- Note: Click on the points (group matches) or W/L (playoffs) to see the match summary.

=== Fixtures ===
Match 3
30 March 2026
19:30 (N)
Scorecard

| Chennai Super Kings; 127 (19.4 overs) | v | Rajasthan Royals (H); 128/2 (12.1 overs) |
| Jamie Overton 43 (36); Ravindra Jadeja 2/18 (3 overs) | | Vaibhav Sooryavanshi 52 (17); Anshul Kamboj 2/27 (3 overs) |

Rajasthan Royals won by 8 wickets
ACA Cricket Stadium, Guwahati
Umpires: Kumar Dharmasena (SL) and Mohit Krishnadas (Ind)
Player of the match: Nandre Burger (Rajasthan Royals)

- Rajasthan Royals won the toss and elected to field.
- Brijesh Sharma (Rajasthan Royals) made his T20 debut.
- Kartik Sharma (Chennai Super Kings) made his IPL debut.

Match 9
4 April 2026
19:30 (N)
Scorecard

| Rajasthan Royals; 210/6 (20 overs) | v | Gujarat Titans (H); 204/8 (20 overs) |
| Dhruv Jurel 75 (42); Kagiso Rabada 2/42 (4 overs) | | Sai Sudharsan 73 (44); Ravi Bishnoi 4/41 (4 overs) |

Rajasthan Royals won by 6 runs
Narendra Modi Stadium, Ahmedabad
Umpires: Ulhas Gandhe (Ind) and Rohan Pandit (Ind)
Player of the match: Ravi Bishnoi (Rajasthan Royals)

- Rajasthan Royals won the toss and elected to bat.

Match 13
7 April 2026
19:30 (N)
Scorecard

| Rajasthan Royals (H); 150/3 (11 overs) | v | Mumbai Indians; 123/9 (11 overs) |
| Yashasvi Jaiswal 77* (32); Allah Ghazanfar 2/20 (2 overs) | | Sherfane Rutherford 25 (8); Nandre Burger 2/21 (2 overs) |

Rajasthan Royals won by 27 runs
ACA Cricket Stadium, Guwahati
Umpires: Kumar Dharmasena (SL) and Mohit Krishnadas (Ind)
Player of the match: Yashasvi Jaiswal (Rajasthan Royals)

- Mumbai Indians won the toss and elected to field.
- The match was reduced to 11 overs per side due to rain.
- Yashasvi Jaiswal (Rajasthan Royals) scored his 100th six in IPL.

Match 16
10 April 2026
19:30 (N)
Scorecard

| Royal Challengers Bengaluru; 201/8 (20 overs) | v | Rajasthan Royals (H); 202/4 (18 overs) |
| Rajat Patidar 63 (40); Ravi Bishnoi 2/32 (4 overs) | | Dhruv Jurel 81* (43); Krunal Pandya 2/30 (4 overs) |

Rajasthan Royals won by 6 wickets
ACA Cricket Stadium, Guwahati
Umpires: Kumar Dharmasena (SL) and Swaroopanand Kannur (Ind)
Player of the match: Vaibhav Sooryavanshi (Rajasthan Royals)

- Rajasthan Royals won the toss and elected to field.

Match 21
13 April 2026
19:30 (N)
Scorecard

| Sunrisers Hyderabad (H); 216/6 (20 overs) | v | Rajasthan Royals; 159 (19 overs) |
| Ishan Kishan 91 (44); Jofra Archer 2/37 (4 overs) | | Donovan Ferreira 69 (44); Sakib Hussain 4/24 (4 overs) |

Sunrisers Hyderabad won by 57 runs
Rajiv Gandhi Stadium, Hyderabad
Umpires: Jayaraman Madanagopal (Ind) and Rohan Pandit (Ind)
Player of the match: Praful Hinge (Sunrisers Hyderabad)

- Rajasthan Royals won the toss and elected to field.
- Praful Hinge and Sakib Hussain (Sunrisers Hyderabad) both made their IPL debuts.
- Praful Hinge also became the first bowler to take 3 wickets in his debut over and to take 3 wickets in the opening over of an IPL innings.

Match 28
19 April 2026
15:30 (D/N)
Scorecard

| Rajasthan Royals; 155/9 (20 overs) | v | Kolkata Knight Riders (H); 161/6 (19.4 overs) |
| Vaibhav Sooryavanshi 46 (28); Varun Chakravarthy 3/14 (4 overs) | | Rinku Singh 53* (34); Ravindra Jadeja 2/8 (3 overs) |

Kolkata Knight Riders won by 4 wickets
Eden Gardens, Kolkata
Umpires: Kumar Dharmasena (SL) and Mohit Krishnadas (Ind)
Player of the match: Varun Chakravarthy (Kolkata Knight Riders)

- Rajasthan Royals won the toss and elected to bat.

Match 32
22 April 2026
19:30 (N)
Scorecard

| Rajasthan Royals; 159/6 (20 overs) | v | Lucknow Super Giants (H); 119 (18 overs) |
| Ravindra Jadeja 43* (29); Mohsin Khan 2/17 (4 overs) | | Mitchell Marsh 55 (41); Jofra Archer 3/20 (4 overs) |

Rajasthan Royals won by 40 runs
Ekana Cricket Stadium, Lucknow
Umpires: Ajitesh Argal (Ind) and Virender Sharma (Ind)
Player of the match: Ravindra Jadeja (Rajasthan Royals)

- Lucknow Super Giants won the toss and elected to field.

Match 36
25 April 2026
19:30 (N)
Scorecard

| Rajasthan Royals (H); 228/6 (20 overs) | v | Sunrisers Hyderabad; 229/5 (18.3 overs) |
| Vaibhav Sooryavanshi 103 (37); Eshan Malinga 2/38 (4 overs) | | Ishan Kishan 74 (31); Jofra Archer 2/34 (4 overs) |

Sunrisers Hyderabad won by 5 wickets
Sawai Mansingh Stadium, Jaipur
Umpires: Kaushik Gandhi (Ind) and Nitin Menon (Ind)
Player of the match: Ishan Kishan (Sunrisers Hyderabad)

- Sunrisers Hyderabad won the toss and elected to field.
- Vaibhav Sooryavanshi (Rajasthan Royals) became the fastest player to score 1,000 runs in T20s, in terms of deliveries faced (473).

Match 40
28 April 2026
19:30 (N)
Scorecard

| Punjab Kings (H); 222/4 (20 overs) | v | Rajasthan Royals; 228/4 (19.2 overs) |
| Marcus Stoinis 62* (22); Yash Raj Punja 2/41 (4 overs) | | Donovan Ferreira 52* (26); Yuzvendra Chahal 3/36 (4 overs) |

Rajasthan Royals won by 6 wickets
Maharaja Yadavindra Singh Stadium, Mullanpur
Umpires: Nitin Menon (Ind) and Tanmay Srivastava (Ind)
Player of the match: Donovan Ferreira (Rajasthan Royals)

- Rajasthan Royals won the toss and elected to field.

Match 43
1 May 2026
19:30 (N)
Scorecard

| Rajasthan Royals (H); 225/6 (20 overs) | v | Delhi Capitals; 226/3 (19.1 overs) |
| Riyan Parag 90 (50); Mitchell Starc 3/40 (4 overs) | | KL Rahul 75 (40); Ravindra Jadeja 1/33 (3 overs) |

Delhi Capitals won by 7 wickets
Sawai Mansingh Stadium, Jaipur
Umpires: Sam Nogajski (Aus) and Virender Sharma (Ind)
Player of the match: KL Rahul (Delhi Capitals)

- Rajasthan Royals won the toss and elected to bat.

Match 52
9 May 2026
19:30 (N)
Scorecard

| Gujarat Titans; 229/4 (20 overs) | v | Rajasthan Royals (H); 152 (16.3 overs) |
| Shubman Gill 84 (44); Brijesh Sharma 2/47 (4 overs) | | Ravindra Jadeja 38 (25); Rashid Khan 4/33 (4 overs) |

Gujarat Titans won by 77 runs
Sawai Mansingh Stadium, Jaipur
Umpires: Saiyed Khalid (Ind) and Virender Sharma (Ind)
Player of the match: Rashid Khan (Gujarat Titans)

- Rajasthan Royals won the toss and elected to field.

Match 62
17 May 2026
19:30 (N)
Scorecard

| Rajasthan Royals; 193/8 (20 overs) | v | Delhi Capitals (H); 197/5 (19.2 overs) |
| Dhruv Jurel 53 (40); Mitchell Starc 4/40 (4 overs) | | KL Rahul 56 (42); Jofra Archer 2/35 (4 overs) |

Delhi Capitals won by 5 wickets
Arun Jaitley Stadium, Delhi
Umpires: Amit Rana (Ind) and Keyur Kelkar (Ind)
Player of the match: Mitchell Starc (Delhi Capitals)

- Delhi Capitals won the toss and elected to field.
- Ravi Singh (Rajasthan Royals) and Tripurana Vijay (Delhi Capitals) both made their IPL debuts.

Match 64
19 May 2026
19:30 (N)
Scorecard

| Lucknow Super Giants; 220/5 (20 overs) | v | Rajasthan Royals (H); 225/3 (19.1 overs) |
| Mitchell Marsh 96 (57); Yash Raj Punja 2/35 (4 overs) | | Vaibhav Sooryavanshi 93 (38); Mohsin Khan 1/31 (4 overs) |

Rajasthan Royals won by 7 wickets
Sawai Mansingh Stadium, Jaipur
Umpires: Adrian Holdstock (SA) and Parashar Joshi (Ind)
Player of the match: Vaibhav Sooryavanshi (Rajasthan Royals)

- Rajasthan Royals won the toss and elected to field.
- Sushant Mishra (Rajasthan Royals) made his IPL debut.

Match 69
24 May 2026
15:30 (D/N)
Scorecard

| Rajasthan Royals; 205/8 (20 overs) | v | Mumbai Indians (H); 175/9 (20 overs) |
| Dhruv Jurel 38 (26); Shardul Thakur 2/41 (4 overs) | | Suryakumar Yadav 60 (42); Jofra Archer 3/17 (4 overs) |

Rajasthan Royals won by 30 runs
Wankhede Stadium, Mumbai
Umpires: Tony Ematty (Ind) and Rohan Pandit (Ind)
Player of the match: Jofra Archer (Rajasthan Royals)

- Mumbai Indians won the toss and elected to field.
- Rajasthan Royals qualified for the playoffs while Punjab Kings and Kolkata Knight Riders were eliminated as a result of this match.

== Playoffs ==
=== Bracket ===
Qualifier 1
26 May 2026 – Dharamshala
1 | Royal Challengers Bengaluru | 254/5 (20 overs)
2 | Gujarat Titans | 162 (19.3 overs)
Eliminator
27 May 2026 – Mullanpur
3 | Sunrisers Hyderabad | 196 (19.2 overs)
4 | Rajasthan Royals | 243/8 (20 overs)

Qualifier 2
29 May 2026 – Mullanpur
Q1L | Gujarat Titans | 219/3 (18.4 overs)
EW | Rajasthan Royals | 214/6 (20 overs)

Final
31 May 2026 – Ahmedabad
Q1W | Royal Challengers Bengaluru | 161/5 (18 overs)
Q2W | Gujarat Titans | 155/8 (20 overs)

- Sources: ESPNcricinfo

=== Eliminator ===
Eliminator
27 May 2026
19:30 (N)
Scorecard

| Rajasthan Royals; 243/8 (20 overs) | v | Sunrisers Hyderabad; 196 (19.2 overs) |
| Vaibhav Sooryavanshi 97 (29); Praful Hinge 3/54 (4 overs) | | Nitish Kumar Reddy 38 (20); Jofra Archer 3/58 (4 overs) |

Rajasthan Royals won by 47 runs
Maharaja Yadavindra Singh International Cricket Stadium, Mullanpur
Umpires: Ulhas Gandhe (Ind) and Adrian Holdstock (SA)
Player of the match: Vaibhav Sooryavanshi (Rajasthan Royals)

- Sunrisers Hyderabad won the toss and elected to field.
- Vaibhav Sooryavanshi (Rajasthan Royals) broke Chris Gayle's record (59) for most sixes in a single IPL season.

=== Qualifier 2 ===
Qualifier 2
29 May 2026
19:30 (N)
Scorecard

| Rajasthan Royals; 214/6 (20 overs) | v | Gujarat Titans; 219/3 (18.4 overs) |
| Vaibhav Sooryavanshi 96 (47); Jason Holder 2/27 (4 overs) | | Shubman Gill 104 (53); Nandre Burger 1/35 (4 overs) |

Gujarat Titans won by 7 wickets
Maharaja Yadavindra Singh International Cricket Stadium, Mullanpur
Umpires: Sam Nogajski (Aus) and Rohan Pandit (Ind)
Player of the match: Shubman Gill (Gujarat Titans)

- Rajasthan Royals won the toss and elected to bat.
- Vaibhav Sooryavanshi (Rajasthan Royals) became the fastest Indian player to score 1,000 runs in IPL, in terms of innings (23).
- Gujarat Titans qualified for their third IPL final.

== Statistics ==
At the IPL end of season awards, Vaibhav Sooryavanshi was awarded as the Most Valuable Player and the Emerging Player of the season. He was also awarded for most runs, most sixes and the highest batting strike rate in the season.

Most runs
| Runs | Player |
|---|---|
| 776 | Vaibhav Sooryavanshi |
| 515 | Dhruv Jurel |
| 427 | Yashasvi Jaiswal |
| 317 | Donovan Ferreira |
| 309 | Riyan Parag |

Most wickets
| Wickets | Player |
|---|---|
| 25 | Jofra Archer |
| 14 | Brijesh Sharma |
| 14 | Nandre Burger |
| 11 | Ravi Bishnoi |
| 10 | Ravindra Jadeja |
