= 2026 Indian Premier League =

Twenty20 cricket tournament

- Tournament logo
- Dates: 28 March – 31 May 2026
- Administrator: Board of Control for Cricket in India
- Cricket format: Twenty20
- Tournament format(s): Group stage and playoffs
- Champions: Royal Challengers Bengaluru (2nd title)
- Runners-up: Gujarat Titans
- Participants: 10
- Matches: 74
- Most valuable player: Vaibhav Sooryavanshi (Rajasthan Royals)
- Most runs: Vaibhav Sooryavanshi (Rajasthan Royals) (776)
- Most wickets: Kagiso Rabada (Gujarat Titans) (29)
- Official website: iplt20.com

The 2026 Indian Premier League, also known as IPL 19 and branded as TATA IPL 2026, was the 19th edition of the Indian Premier League, a professional Twenty20 cricket league. The tournament featured 10 teams competing in 74 matches from 28 March to 31 May across 13 venues.

Defending champions Royal Challengers Bengaluru defeated Gujarat Titans by 5 wickets in the final to secure their second consecutive IPL title. They became the first franchise to win the IPL and the Women's Premier League in the same year. Vaibhav Sooryavanshi of Rajasthan Royals scored the most runs (776) while Kagiso Rabada of Gujarat took the most wickets (29). Sooryavanshi was also named the most valuable player of the tournament.

== Background ==
The Indian Premier League (IPL) is a professional Twenty20 (T20) cricket league, organised by the Board of Control for Cricket in India (BCCI). It has been held annually since the first edition in 2008. Royal Challengers Bengaluru were the defending champions, having won their maiden title in the previous season after defeating Punjab Kings in the final.

=== Format ===
Each team played once against the teams in their group and twice against the teams in the other group. After the group stage, the top four teams, based on aggregate points, advanced to the playoffs. In this stage, the top two teams competed with each other (in a match titled "Qualifier 1"), as did the remaining two teams (in a match titled "Eliminator"). While the winner of the Qualifier 1 directly qualified for the final match, the losing team had another chance to qualify for the final match by competing against the winning team of the Eliminator (in a match titled "Qualifier 2"). The winner of this subsequent Qualifier 2 advanced to the final match. Teams were seeded into groups based on the number of titles they had won.

The IPL Governing Council had initially announced that the IPL would expand to 84 matches for 2026 and 2027, with it expected to expand to 94 matches from 2028 onwards with the return of the complete double round-robin format that was used until 2021. However, the number of matches was kept as 74 for one more edition as it was in the previous four seasons.

Group A	Group B
Chennai Super Kings	Mumbai Indians
Kolkata Knight Riders	Sunrisers Hyderabad
Rajasthan Royals	Gujarat Titans
Royal Challengers Bengaluru	Delhi Capitals
Punjab Kings	Lucknow Super Giants

=== Schedule ===
According to ESPNcricinfo, the dates of the tournament window for the three seasons between 2025 and 2027 were sent to franchises ahead of the 2025 auction. In November 2024, the tentative dates for the three seasons were announced, with the 2026 edition set to take place from 15 March to 31 May. In December 2025, it was announced that the 2026 season would commence on 26 March to allow for a three-week gap after the 2026 Men's T20 World Cup final scheduled to take place on 8 March. In February 2026, it was announced that the 2026 season would commence 2 days later on 28 March. This led to a clash with the 2026 Pakistan Super League for the second consecutive year taking place from 26 March to 3 May 2026, which was again moved from its typical February–March window for the same reason.

In March 2026, it was announced that the fixtures for that season would be announced in two parts due to the state assembly elections in Assam, Tamil Nadu, and West Bengal; for which the dates were not announced till 15 March. The first part of the schedule comprising the first twenty matches was announced on 11 March, with the inaugural match being hosted at M. Chinnaswamy Stadium between the defending champions Royal Challengers Bengaluru and Sunrisers Hyderabad on 28 March. The complete fixtures for the league stage were announced on 26 March. On 6 May the playoff fixtures were confirmed with the Qualifier 1 at HPCA Cricket Stadium on 26 May, the Eliminator and Qualifier 2 at Maharaja Yadavindra Singh Stadium on 27 and 29 May, and the final at Narendra Modi Stadium on 31 May, with the venue hosting its fourth final after 2022, 2023 and 2025.

=== Exclusion of Mustafizur Rahman ===
Bangladeshi fast bowler Mustafizur Rahman was bought by Kolkata Knight Riders for ₹9.2 crore (US$980,000) in the auction. Following anti-Hindu violence in Bangladesh during 2025 and the lynching of Dipu Chandra Das in December 2025, there were calls for the exclusion of Bangladeshi players from the IPL. In January 2026, the BCCI requested that the franchise release Rahman from the squad and permitted them to select a replacement player. This move was criticized by former Indian cricketer Madan Lal, Congress politician Shashi Tharoor, and former Bangladeshi captains Khaled Mahmud and Mohammad Ashraful while former Indian cricketer Aakash Chopra and BJP politician Sangeet Singh Som defended the BCCI's move.

This led the BCCI to put the Indian tour of Bangladesh on hold due to tensions. Furthermore, the Bangladesh Cricket Board requested the International Cricket Council (ICC) to shift their matches at the 2026 Men's T20 World Cup which was to be co-hosted by India and Sri Lanka, out of India, similar to that of Pakistan's. But the request was rejected by the ICC, and Bangladesh ultimately withdrew from the T20 World Cup. The Bangladeshi government also banned the broadcast of IPL in their country. Following the 2026 Bangladeshi general election, the newly elected government clarified that the broadcast of the IPL is not banned in their country anymore.

=== Marketing ===
The Tata Group renewed their contract as the title sponsors of the IPL for a tenure of 5 years (2024–2028) for ₹2,500 crore (US$270 million). The advertising campaign for the 2026 IPL consisted of 27 sponsors including – Google AI Mode, Campa Energy, Havells & Lloyd, Birla Opus, Hero MotoCorp and Amazon.

=== Broadcasting ===
JioStar's Star Sports and JioHotstar, held the television and digital rights respectively, for the remainder of the 2023–2027 cycle. In the opening weekend of the season which included two matches, linear television reported 7.84 million viewership, with an 18.8% drop in the average television viewership rating compared to last season, while JioHotstar reported 515 million viewership, with a 26% increase in total watch time to 32.6 billion minutes.

== Teams ==
Team captains during a promotional event for the 2026 IPL.

The same 10 teams from the previous season returned.

Group	Team	2025 performance	Head coach	Captain
A	Chennai Super Kings	10th	Stephen Fleming	Ruturaj Gaikwad
A	Kolkata Knight Riders	8th	Abhishek Nayar	Ajinkya Rahane
A	Punjab Kings	Runners-up	Ricky Ponting	Shreyas Iyer
A	Rajasthan Royals	9th	Kumar Sangakkara	Riyan Parag (Note: Yashasvi Jaiswal captained Rajasthan Royals against Gujarat Titans when Riyan Parag was unavailable.)
A	Royal Challengers Bengaluru	Champions	Andy Flower	Rajat Patidar (Note: Jitesh Sharma captained Royal Challengers Bengaluru against Punjab Kings when Rajat Patidar was unavailable.)
B	Delhi Capitals	5th	Hemang Badani	Axar Patel
B	Gujarat Titans	4th	Ashish Nehra	Shubman Gill
B	Lucknow Super Giants	7th	Justin Langer	Rishabh Pant
B	Mumbai Indians	3rd	Mahela Jayawardene	Hardik Pandya (Note: Suryakumar Yadav captained Mumbai Indians against Lucknow Super Giants and Royal Challengers Bengaluru when Hardik Pandya was unavailable.) (Note: Jasprit Bumrah captained Mumbai Indians against Punjab Kings when both Hardik Pandya and Suryakumar Yadav were unavailable.)
B	Sunrisers Hyderabad	6th	Daniel Vettori	Pat Cummins (Note: Ishan Kishan captained Sunrisers Hyderabad for the first half of the season (first 7 matches) when Pat Cummins was unavailable.)

=== Personnel changes ===
The franchises were required to submit their retention lists before 15 November 2025, and a total of 173 players were retained ahead of the auction. The auction was held on 16 December 2025 in Abu Dhabi, United Arab Emirates with the auction purse for each franchise set at ₹125 crore (US$13 million). A total of 1,355 players registered for the auction, of which 369 players were shortlisted and 156 were featured in the auction and 77 were sold in the auction. Cameron Green became the most expensive overseas player and the third most expensive player in the history of the IPL when he was bought by Kolkata for ₹25.20 crore (US$2.7 million). Prashant Veer and Kartik Sharma became the joint-most expensive uncapped players in the history of the IPL when they were both bought by Chennai Super Kings for ₹14.20 crore (US$1.5 million) each. The 79 unsold players included players such as Jake Fraser-McGurk, Jonny Bairstow, Daryl Mitchell, Devon Conway, Alzarri Joseph, Gus Atkinson, Deepak Hooda and Karn Sharma.

== Venues ==
The league stage was played at 13 stadiums across India. 12 venues from the previous season returned as respective home grounds with HPCA Cricket Stadium and ACA Cricket Stadium as secondary home venues for three Punjab Kings matches and three Rajasthan Royals matches respectively. ACA–VDCA Cricket Stadium was dropped as Delhi Capitals secondary home venue while Shaheed Veer Narayan Singh Stadium which had previously served as secondary home venue for Delhi Daredevils until 2016, was added as secondary home venue for two Royal Challengers Bengaluru matches. The opening match was played at M. Chinnaswamy Stadium. The playoffs were played at HPCA Cricket Stadium and Maharaja Yadavindra Singh Stadium with the final at Narendra Modi Stadium.

Ahmedabad	Bengaluru	Chennai	Delhi	Dharamshala
Gujarat Titans	Royal Challengers Bengaluru	Chennai Super Kings	Delhi Capitals	Punjab Kings
Narendra Modi Stadium	M. Chinnaswamy Stadium	M. A. Chidambaram Stadium	Arun Jaitley Stadium	HPCA Cricket Stadium
Capacity: 132,000	Capacity: 40,000	Capacity: 39,000	Capacity: 35,200	Capacity: 21,200
Narendra Modi Stadium in 2023	M. Chinnaswamy Stadium in 2017	M. A. Chidambaram Stadium in 2023	Arun Jaitley Stadium in 2023	HPCA Cricket Stadium in 2015
Guwahati	A map of India with pin-points on 2026 Indian Premier League venues			Hyderabad
Rajasthan Royals	A map of India with pin-points on 2026 Indian Premier League venues			Sunrisers Hyderabad
ACA Cricket Stadium	A map of India with pin-points on 2026 Indian Premier League venues			Rajiv Gandhi Stadium
Capacity: 46,000	A map of India with pin-points on 2026 Indian Premier League venues			Capacity: 55,000
ACA Cricket Stadium in 2018	A map of India with pin-points on 2026 Indian Premier League venues			Rajiv Gandhi Stadium in 2024
Jaipur	A map of India with pin-points on 2026 Indian Premier League venues			Kolkata
Rajasthan Royals	A map of India with pin-points on 2026 Indian Premier League venues			Kolkata Knight Riders
Sawai Mansingh Stadium	A map of India with pin-points on 2026 Indian Premier League venues			Eden Gardens
Capacity: 30,000	A map of India with pin-points on 2026 Indian Premier League venues			Capacity: 68,000
Sawai Mansingh Stadium in 2013	A map of India with pin-points on 2026 Indian Premier League venues			Eden Gardens in 2023
Lucknow	Mullanpur	Mumbai	Raipur	
Lucknow Super Giants	Punjab Kings	Mumbai Indians	Royal Challengers Bengaluru	
Ekana Cricket Stadium	Maharaja Yadavindra Singh Stadium	Wankhede Stadium	Shaheed Veer Narayan Singh Stadium	
Capacity: 50,000	Capacity: 38,000	Capacity: 33,108	Capacity: 65,000	
Ekana Cricket Stadium in 2018	Maharaja Yadavindra Singh Stadium in 2026	Wankhede Stadium in 2011	Shaheed Veer Narayan Singh Stadium in 2021	

== League stage ==
=== Points table ===
League stage standings
Pos	Grp	Team	Pld	W	L	NR	Pts	NRR	Qualification
1	A	Royal Challengers Bengaluru (C)	14	9	5	0	18	0.783	Advanced to Qualifier 1
2	B	Gujarat Titans (R)	14	9	5	0	18	0.695	Advanced to Qualifier 1
3	B	Sunrisers Hyderabad (4th)	14	9	5	0	18	0.524	Advanced to Eliminator
4	A	Rajasthan Royals (3rd)	14	8	6	0	16	0.189	Advanced to Eliminator
5	A	Punjab Kings	14	7	6	1	15	0.309	Eliminated
6	B	Delhi Capitals	14	7	7	0	14	−0.651	Eliminated
7	A	Kolkata Knight Riders	14	6	7	1	13	−0.147	Eliminated
8	A	Chennai Super Kings	14	6	8	0	12	−0.345	Eliminated
9	B	Mumbai Indians	14	4	10	0	8	−0.584	Eliminated
10	B	Lucknow Super Giants	14	4	10	0	8	−0.740	Eliminated

Source: ESPNcricinfo
Rules for classification: 1) Points; 2) Wins; 3) Net run rate; 4) Wickets taken per fair deliveries; 5) drawing lots
(C) Champions; (R) Runners-up

=== Match summary ===
Team	Group matches														Playoffs			
Team	1	2	3	4	5	6	7	8	9	10	11	12	13	14	Q1	E	Q2	F
Chennai Super Kings	0	0	0	2	4	4	6	6	8	10	12	12	12	12				
Delhi Capitals	2	4	4	4	6	6	6	6	8	8	8	10	12	14				
Gujarat Titans	0	0	2	4	6	6	6	8	10	12	14	16	16	18	L		W	L
Kolkata Knight Riders	0	0	1	1	1	1	3	5	7	9	9	11	13	13				
Lucknow Super Giants	0	2	4	4	4	4	4	4	4	6	6	8	8	8				
Mumbai Indians	2	2	2	2	2	4	4	4	4	6	6	8	8	8				
Punjab Kings	2	4	5	7	9	11	13	13	13	13	13	13	13	15				
Rajasthan Royals	2	4	6	8	8	8	10	10	12	12	12	12	14	16		W	L	
Royal Challengers Bengaluru	2	4	4	6	8	8	10	12	12	12	14	16	18	18	W			W
Sunrisers Hyderabad	0	2	2	2	4	6	8	10	12	12	14	14	16	18		L		

Win	Loss	No result

- Note: The total points at the end of each group match are listed.
- Note: Click on the points (group matches) or W/L (playoffs) to see the match summary.

Visitor team →	CSK	DC	GT	KKR	LSG	MI	PBKS	RR	RCB	SRH
Home team ↓	CSK	DC	GT	KKR	LSG	MI	PBKS	RR	RCB	SRH
Chennai Super Kings		Chennai; 23 runs	Gujarat; 8 wickets	Chennai; 32 runs	Chennai; 5 wickets	Chennai; 8 wickets	Punjab; 5 wickets			Hyderabad; 5 wickets
Delhi Capitals	Chennai; 8 wickets		Gujarat; 1 run	Kolkata; 8 wickets		Delhi; 6 wickets	Punjab; 6 wickets	Delhi; 5 wickets	Bengaluru; 9 wickets	
Gujarat Titans	Gujarat; 89 runs			Gujarat; 5 wickets		Mumbai; 99 runs	Gujarat; 4 wickets	Rajasthan; 6 runs	Gujarat; 4 wickets	Gujarat; 82 runs
Kolkata Knight Riders		Delhi; 40 runs	Kolkata; 29 runs		Lucknow; 3 wickets	Kolkata; 4 wickets	Match abandoned	Kolkata; 4 wickets		Hyderabad; 65 runs
Lucknow Super Giants	Lucknow; 7 wickets	Delhi; 6 wickets	Gujarat; 7 wickets	Kolkata; Super Over			Punjab; 7 wickets	Rajasthan; 40 runs	Lucknow; 9 runs (DLS)	
Mumbai Indians	Chennai; 103 runs			Mumbai; 6 wickets	Mumbai; 6 wickets		Punjab; 7 wickets	Rajasthan; 30 runs	Bengaluru; 18 runs	Hyderabad; 6 wickets
Punjab Kings		Delhi; 3 wickets	Punjab; 3 wickets		Punjab; 54 runs	Mumbai; 6 wickets		Rajasthan; 6 wickets	Bengaluru; 23 runs	Punjab; 6 wickets
Rajasthan Royals	Rajasthan; 8 wickets	Delhi; 7 wickets	Gujarat; 77 runs		Rajasthan; 7 wickets	Rajasthan; 27 runs			Rajasthan; 6 wickets	Hyderabad; 5 wickets
Royal Challengers Bengaluru	Bengaluru; 43 runs	Delhi; 6 wickets	Bengaluru; 5 wickets	Bengaluru; 6 wickets	Bengaluru; 5 wickets	Bengaluru; 2 wickets				Bengaluru; 6 wickets
Sunrisers Hyderabad	Hyderabad; 10 runs	Hyderabad; 47 runs		Kolkata; 7 wickets	Lucknow; 5 wickets		Hyderabad; 33 runs	Hyderabad; 57 runs	Hyderabad; 55 runs	

Home team won	Visitor team won

- Note: Results listed are according to the home (horizontal) and visitor (vertical) teams.
- Note: Click on a result to see a summary of the match.

=== Fixtures ===
Match 1
28 March 2026
19:30 (N)
Scorecard

Sunrisers Hyderabad; 201/9 (20 overs)	v	Royal Challengers Bengaluru (H); 203/4 (15.4 overs)
Ishan Kishan 80 (38); Jacob Duffy 3/22 (4 overs)		Virat Kohli 69* (38); David Payne 2/35 (3 overs)

Royal Challengers Bengaluru won by 6 wickets
M. Chinnaswamy Stadium, Bengaluru
Umpires: Ulhas Gandhe (Ind) and Jayaraman Madanagopal (Ind)
Player of the match: Jacob Duffy (Royal Challengers Bengaluru)

- Royal Challengers Bengaluru won the toss and elected to field.
- Abhinandan Singh (Royal Challengers Bengaluru) made his T20 debut.
- Jacob Duffy (Royal Challengers Bengaluru) and David Payne (Sunrisers Hyderabad) both made their IPL debuts.

Match 2
29 March 2026
19:30 (N)
Scorecard

Kolkata Knight Riders; 220/4 (20 overs)	v	Mumbai Indians (H); 224/4 (19.1 overs)
Ajinkya Rahane 67 (40); Shardul Thakur 3/39 (4 overs)		Ryan Rickelton 81 (43); Sunil Narine 1/30 (3 overs)

Mumbai Indians won by 6 wickets
Wankhede Stadium, Mumbai
Umpires: Saidarshan Kumar (Ind) and Anish Sahasrabudhe (Ind)
Player of the match: Shardul Thakur (Mumbai Indians)

- Mumbai Indians won the toss and elected to field.
- Mumbai Indians became the first franchise to play in 300 T20 matches.
- Allah Ghazanfar (Mumbai Indians), Finn Allen and Blessing Muzarabani (Kolkata Knight Riders) all made their IPL debuts.
- Ajinkya Rahane (Kolkata Knight Riders) played in his 200th IPL match.
- This was Mumbai Indians' highest successful run chase in the IPL.
- For the first time since the 2012 season, Mumbai Indians won their opening match.

Match 3
30 March 2026
19:30 (N)
Scorecard

Chennai Super Kings; 127 (19.4 overs)	v	Rajasthan Royals (H); 128/2 (12.1 overs)
Jamie Overton 43 (36); Ravindra Jadeja 2/18 (3 overs)		Vaibhav Sooryavanshi 52 (17); Anshul Kamboj 2/27 (3 overs)

Rajasthan Royals won by 8 wickets
ACA Cricket Stadium, Guwahati
Umpires: Kumar Dharmasena (SL) and Mohit Krishnadas (Ind)
Player of the match: Nandre Burger (Rajasthan Royals)

- Rajasthan Royals won the toss and elected to field.
- Brijesh Sharma (Rajasthan Royals) made his T20 debut.
- Kartik Sharma (Chennai Super Kings) made his IPL debut.

Match 4
31 March 2026
19:30 (N)
Scorecard

Gujarat Titans; 162/6 (20 overs)	v	Punjab Kings (H); 165/7 (19.1 overs)
Shubman Gill 39 (27); Vijaykumar Vyshak 3/34 (4 overs)		Cooper Connolly 72* (44); Prasidh Krishna 3/29 (4 overs)

Punjab Kings won by 3 wickets
Maharaja Yadavindra Singh Stadium, Mullanpur
Umpires: Abhijit Bhattacharya (Ind) and Akshay Totre (Ind)
Player of the match: Cooper Connolly (Punjab Kings)

- Punjab Kings won the toss and elected to field.
- Cooper Connolly (Punjab Kings) and Ashok Sharma (Gujarat Titans) both made their IPL debuts.

Match 5
1 April 2026
19:30 (N)
Scorecard

Lucknow Super Giants (H); 141 (18.4 overs)	v	Delhi Capitals; 145/4 (17.1 overs)
Abdul Samad 36 (25); Lungi Ngidi 3/27 (3.4 overs)		Sameer Rizvi 70* (47); Prince Yadav 2/20 (3 overs)

Delhi Capitals won by 6 wickets
Ekana Cricket Stadium, Lucknow
Umpires: Ulhas Gandhe (Ind) and Rohan Pandit (Ind)
Player of the match: Sameer Rizvi (Delhi Capitals)

- Delhi Capitals won the toss and elected to field.
- Pathum Nissanka (Delhi Capitals) made his IPL debut.

Match 6
2 April 2026
19:30 (N)
Scorecard

Sunrisers Hyderabad; 226/8 (20 overs)	v	Kolkata Knight Riders (H); 161 (16 overs)
Heinrich Klaasen 52 (35); Blessing Muzarabani 4/41 (4 overs)		Angkrish Raghuvanshi 52 (29); Jaydev Unadkat 3/21 (3 overs)

Sunrisers Hyderabad won by 65 runs
Eden Gardens, Kolkata
Umpires: Vinod Seshan (Ind) and Saidarshan Kumar (Ind)
Player of the match: Nitish Kumar Reddy (Sunrisers Hyderabad)

- Kolkata Knight Riders won the toss and elected to field.
- Abhishek Sharma became the first Indian player and overall second player to hit 100 sixes for Sunrisers Hyderabad.

Match 7
3 April 2026
19:30 (N)
Scorecard

Chennai Super Kings (H); 209/5 (20 overs)	v	Punjab Kings; 210/5 (18.4 overs)
Ayush Mhatre 73 (43); Vijaykumar Vyshak 2/38 (4 overs)		Shreyas Iyer 50 (29); Anshul Kamboj 2/43 (3.4 overs)

Punjab Kings won by 5 wickets
M. A. Chidambaram Stadium, Chennai
Umpires: Abhijit Bhattacharya (Ind) and Akshay Totre (Ind)
Player of the match: Priyansh Arya (Punjab Kings)

- Punjab Kings won the toss and elected to field.

Match 8
4 April 2026
15:30 (D/N)
Scorecard

Mumbai Indians; 162/6 (20 overs)	v	Delhi Capitals (H); 164/4 (18.1 overs)
Suryakumar Yadav 51 (36); Mukesh Kumar 2/26 (3 overs)		Sameer Rizvi 90 (51); Deepak Chahar 1/20 (3 overs)

Delhi Capitals won by 6 wickets
Arun Jaitley Stadium, Delhi
Umpires: Kumar Dharmasena (SL) and Mohit Krishnadas (Ind)
Player of the match: Sameer Rizvi (Delhi Capitals)

- Delhi Capitals won the toss and elected to field.

Match 9
4 April 2026
19:30 (N)
Scorecard

Rajasthan Royals; 210/6 (20 overs)	v	Gujarat Titans (H); 204/8 (20 overs)
Dhruv Jurel 75 (42); Kagiso Rabada 2/42 (4 overs)		Sai Sudharsan 73 (44); Ravi Bishnoi 4/41 (4 overs)

Rajasthan Royals won by 6 runs
Narendra Modi Stadium, Ahmedabad
Umpires: Ulhas Gandhe (Ind) and Rohan Pandit (Ind)
Player of the match: Ravi Bishnoi (Rajasthan Royals)

- Rajasthan Royals won the toss and elected to bat.

Match 10
5 April 2026
15:30 (D/N)
Scorecard

Sunrisers Hyderabad (H); 156/9 (20 overs)	v	Lucknow Super Giants; 160/5 (19.5 overs)
Heinrich Klaasen 62 (41); Mohammed Shami 2/9 (4 overs)		Rishabh Pant 68* (50); Harsh Dubey 2/18 (4 overs)

Lucknow Super Giants won by 5 wickets
Rajiv Gandhi Stadium, Hyderabad
Umpires: Saidarshan Kumar (Ind) and Anish Sahasrabudhe (Ind)
Player of the match: Mohammed Shami (Lucknow Super Giants)

- Lucknow Super Giants won the toss and elected to field.
- Heinrich Klaasen and Nitish Kumar Reddy scored the highest fifth-wicket partnership for Sunrisers Hyderabad (116).

Match 11
5 April 2026
19:30 (N)
Scorecard

Royal Challengers Bengaluru (H); 250/3 (20 overs)	v	Chennai Super Kings; 207 (19.4 overs)
Tim David 70* (25); Shivam Dube 1/30 (2 overs)		Sarfaraz Khan 50 (25); Bhuvneshwar Kumar 3/41 (4 overs)

Royal Challengers Bengaluru won by 43 runs
M. Chinnaswamy Stadium, Bengaluru
Umpires: K. N. Ananthapadmanabhan (Ind) and Akshay Totre (Ind)
Player of the match: Tim David (Royal Challengers Bengaluru)

- Chennai Super Kings won the toss and elected to field.
- Tim David (Royal Challengers Bengaluru) scored his 400th six in T20s.
- Bhuvneshwar Kumar (Royal Challengers Bengaluru) became the first fast bowler to take 200 wickets in IPL.

Match 12
6 April 2026
19:30 (N)
Scorecard

Kolkata Knight Riders (H); 25/2 (3.4 overs)	v	Punjab Kings
Ajinkya Rahane 8* (6); Xavier Bartlett 2/9 (1.4 overs)

No result
Eden Gardens, Kolkata
Umpires: Abhijeet Bengeri (Ind) and Jayaraman Madanagopal (Ind)

- Kolkata Knight Riders won the toss and elected to bat.
- No further play was possible due to rain.

Match 13
7 April 2026
19:30 (N)
Scorecard

Rajasthan Royals (H); 150/3 (11 overs)	v	Mumbai Indians; 123/9 (11 overs)
Yashasvi Jaiswal 77* (32); Allah Ghazanfar 2/20 (2 overs)		Sherfane Rutherford 25 (8); Nandre Burger 2/21 (2 overs)

Rajasthan Royals won by 27 runs
ACA Cricket Stadium, Guwahati
Umpires: Kumar Dharmasena (SL) and Mohit Krishnadas (Ind)
Player of the match: Yashasvi Jaiswal (Rajasthan Royals)

- Mumbai Indians won the toss and elected to field.
- The match was reduced to 11 overs per side due to rain.
- Yashasvi Jaiswal (Rajasthan Royals) scored his 100th six in IPL.

Match 14
8 April 2026
19:30 (N)
Scorecard

Gujarat Titans; 210/4 (20 overs)	v	Delhi Capitals (H); 209/8 (20 overs)
Shubman Gill 70 (45); Mukesh Kumar 2/55 (4 overs)		KL Rahul 92 (52); Rashid Khan 3/17 (4 overs)

Gujarat Titans won by 1 run
Arun Jaitley Stadium, Delhi
Umpires: Nitin Menon (Ind) and Anish Sahasrabudhe (Ind)
Player of the match: Rashid Khan (Gujarat Titans)

- Delhi Capitals won the toss and elected to field.
- Jos Buttler (Gujarat Titans) became the first non-West Indies' batter to score 600 sixes in T20s.

Match 15
9 April 2026
19:30 (N)
Scorecard

Kolkata Knight Riders (H); 181/4 (20 overs)	v	Lucknow Super Giants; 182/7 (20 overs)
Angkrish Raghuvanshi 45 (33); Digvesh Rathi 1/25 (4 overs)		Mukul Choudhary 54* (27); Anukul Roy 2/32 (4 overs)

Lucknow Super Giants won by 3 wickets
Eden Gardens, Kolkata
Umpires: Adrian Holdstock (SA) and Akshay Totre (Ind)
Player of the match: Mukul Choudhary (Lucknow Super Giants)

- Lucknow Super Giants won the toss and elected to field.

Match 16
10 April 2026
19:30 (N)
Scorecard

Royal Challengers Bengaluru; 201/8 (20 overs)	v	Rajasthan Royals (H); 202/4 (18 overs)
Rajat Patidar 63 (40); Ravi Bishnoi 2/32 (4 overs)		Dhruv Jurel 81* (43); Krunal Pandya 2/30 (4 overs)

Rajasthan Royals won by 6 wickets
ACA Cricket Stadium, Guwahati
Umpires: Kumar Dharmasena (SL) and Swaroopanand Kannur (Ind)
Player of the match: Vaibhav Sooryavanshi (Rajasthan Royals)

- Rajasthan Royals won the toss and elected to field.

Match 17
11 April 2026
15:30 (D/N)
Scorecard

Sunrisers Hyderabad; 219/6 (20 overs)	v	Punjab Kings (H); 223/4 (18.5 overs)
Abhishek Sharma 74 (28); Shashank Singh 2/20 (3 overs)		Shreyas Iyer 69* (33); Shivang Kumar 3/33 (4 overs)

Punjab Kings won by 6 wickets
Maharaja Yadavindra Singh Stadium, Mullanpur
Umpires: Abhijeet Bengeri (Ind) and Rohan Pandit (Ind)
Player of the match: Shreyas Iyer (Punjab Kings)

- Punjab Kings won the toss and elected to field.

Match 18
11 April 2026
19:30 (N)
Scorecard

Chennai Super Kings (H); 212/2 (20 overs)	v	Delhi Capitals; 189 (20 overs)
Sanju Samson 115* (56); Axar Patel 1/39 (4 overs)		Tristan Stubbs 60 (38); Jamie Overton 4/18 (4 overs)

Chennai Super Kings won by 23 runs
M. A. Chidambaram Stadium, Chennai
Umpires: Saidarshan Kumar (Ind) and Vinod Seshan (Ind)
Player of the match: Sanju Samson (Chennai Super Kings)

- Delhi Capitals won the toss and elected to field.
- Sanju Samson (Chennai Super Kings) scored his 400th six in T20s.

Match 19
12 April 2026
15:30 (D/N)
Scorecard

Lucknow Super Giants (H); 164/8 (20 overs)	v	Gujarat Titans; 165/3 (18.4 overs)
Aiden Markram 30 (21); Prasidh Krishna 4/28 (4 overs)		Jos Buttler 60 (37); Prince Yadav 1/31 (4 overs); Digvesh Rathi 1/31 (4 overs)

Gujarat Titans won by 7 wickets
Ekana Cricket Stadium, Lucknow
Umpires: K. N. Ananthapadmanabhan (Ind) and Abhijit Bhattacharya (Ind)
Player of the match: Prasidh Krishna (Gujarat Titans)

- Gujarat Titans won the toss and elected to field.

Match 20
12 April 2026
19:30 (N)
Scorecard

Royal Challengers Bengaluru; 240/4 (20 overs)	v	Mumbai Indians (H); 222/5 (20 overs)
Phil Salt 78 (36); Shardul Thakur 1/32 (2 overs)		Sherfane Rutherford 71* (31); Suyash Sharma 2/47 (4 overs)

Royal Challengers Bengaluru won by 18 runs
Wankhede Stadium, Mumbai
Umpires: Swaroopanand Kannur (Ind) and Virender Sharma (Ind)
Player of the match: Phil Salt (Royal Challengers Bengaluru)

- Mumbai Indians won the toss and elected to field.

Match 21
13 April 2026
19:30 (N)
Scorecard

Sunrisers Hyderabad (H); 216/6 (20 overs)	v	Rajasthan Royals; 159 (19 overs)
Ishan Kishan 91 (44); Jofra Archer 2/37 (4 overs)		Donovan Ferreira 69 (44); Sakib Hussain 4/24 (4 overs)

Sunrisers Hyderabad won by 57 runs
Rajiv Gandhi Stadium, Hyderabad
Umpires: Jayaraman Madanagopal (Ind) and Rohan Pandit (Ind)
Player of the match: Praful Hinge (Sunrisers Hyderabad)

- Rajasthan Royals won the toss and elected to field.
- Praful Hinge and Sakib Hussain (Sunrisers Hyderabad) both made their IPL debuts.
- Praful Hinge also became the first bowler to take 3 wickets in his debut over and to take 3 wickets in the opening over of an IPL innings.

Match 22
14 April 2026
19:30 (N)
Scorecard

Chennai Super Kings (H); 192/5 (20 overs)	v	Kolkata Knight Riders; 160/7 (20 overs)
Sanju Samson 48 (32); Kartik Tyagi 2/35 (4 overs)		Ramandeep Singh 35 (23); Noor Ahmad 3/21 (4 overs)

Chennai Super Kings won by 32 runs
M. A. Chidambaram Stadium, Chennai
Umpires: Nitin Menon (Ind) and Saidharshan Kumar (Ind)
Player of the match: Noor Ahmad (Chennai Super Kings)

- Kolkata Knight Riders won the toss and elected to field.

Match 23
15 April 2026
19:30 (N)
Scorecard

Lucknow Super Giants; 146 (20 overs)	v	Royal Challengers Bengaluru (H); 149/5 (15.1 overs)
Mitchell Marsh 40 (32); Rasikh Salam 4/24 (4 overs)		Virat Kohli 49 (34); Prince Yadav 3/32 (3 overs)

Royal Challengers Bengaluru won by 5 wickets
M. Chinnaswamy Stadium, Bengaluru
Umpires: Adrian Holdstock (SA) and Bhavesh Patel (Ind)
Player of the match: Josh Hazlewood (Royal Challengers Bengaluru)

- Royal Challengers Bengaluru won the toss and elected to field.
- Krunal Pandya (Royal Challengers Bengaluru) took his 100th wicket in IPL.

Match 24
16 April 2026
19:30 (N)
Scorecard

Mumbai Indians (H); 195/6 (20 overs)	v	Punjab Kings; 198/3 (16.3 overs)
Quinton de Kock 112* (60); Arshdeep Singh 3/22 (4 overs)		Prabhsimran Singh 80* (39); Allah Ghazanfar 2/31 (4 overs)

Punjab Kings won by 7 wickets
Wankhede Stadium, Mumbai
Umpires: Mohit Krishnadas (Ind) and Virender Sharma (Ind)
Player of the match: Arshdeep Singh (Punjab Kings)

- Punjab Kings won the toss and elected to field.

Match 25
17 April 2026
19:30 (N)
Scorecard

Kolkata Knight Riders; 180 (20 overs)	v	Gujarat Titans (H); 181/5 (19.4 overs)
Cameron Green 79 (55); Kagiso Rabada 3/29 (4 overs)		Shubman Gill 86 (50); Varun Chakravarthy 2/34 (4 overs)

Gujarat Titans won by 5 wickets
Narendra Modi Stadium, Ahmedabad
Umpires: Rohan Pandit (Ind) and Ulhas Gandhe (Ind)
Player of the match: Shubman Gill (Gujarat Titans)

- Kolkata Knight Riders won the toss and elected to bat.
- Jos Buttler (Gujarat Titans) became the fourth player to take 300 catches in T20s.

Match 26
18 April 2026
15:30 (D/N)
Scorecard

Royal Challengers Bengaluru (H); 175/8 (20 overs)	v	Delhi Capitals; 179/4 (19.5 overs)
Phil Salt 63 (38); Axar Patel 2/18 (3 overs)		Tristan Stubbs 60* (47); Bhuvneshwar Kumar 4/26 (4 overs)

Delhi Capitals won by 6 wickets
M. Chinnaswamy Stadium, Bengaluru
Umpires: Abhijit Bhattacharya (Ind) and Bhavesh Patel (Ind)
Player of the match: Tristan Stubbs (Delhi Capitals)

- Delhi Capitals won the toss and elected to field.
- Royal Challengers Bengaluru became the first IPL team to play in 100 matches at a home venue.

Match 27
18 April 2026
19:30 (N)
Scorecard

Sunrisers Hyderabad (H); 194/9 (20 overs)	v	Chennai Super Kings; 184/8 (20 overs)
Abhishek Sharma 59 (22); Anshul Kamboj 3/22 (3 overs)		Matthew Short 34 (30); Eshan Malinga 3/29 (4 overs)

Sunrisers Hyderabad won by 10 runs
Rajiv Gandhi Stadium, Hyderabad
Umpires: Anish Sahasrabudhe (Ind) and Vinod Seshan (Ind)
Player of the match: Eshan Malinga (Sunrisers Hyderabad)

- Chennai Super Kings won the toss and elected to field.

Match 28
19 April 2026
15:30 (D/N)
Scorecard

Rajasthan Royals; 155/9 (20 overs)	v	Kolkata Knight Riders (H); 161/6 (19.4 overs)
Vaibhav Sooryavanshi 46 (28); Varun Chakravarthy 3/14 (4 overs)		Rinku Singh 53* (34); Ravindra Jadeja 2/8 (3 overs)

Kolkata Knight Riders won by 4 wickets
Eden Gardens, Kolkata
Umpires: Kumar Dharmasena (SL) and Mohit Krishnadas (Ind)
Player of the match: Varun Chakravarthy (Kolkata Knight Riders)

- Rajasthan Royals won the toss and elected to bat.

Match 29
19 April 2026
19:30 (N)
Scorecard

Punjab Kings (H); 254/7 (20 overs)	v	Lucknow Super Giants; 200/5 (20 overs)
Priyansh Arya 93 (37); Prince Yadav 2/25 (4 overs)		Rishabh Pant 43 (23); Marco Jansen 2/36 (4 overs)

Punjab Kings won by 54 runs
Maharaja Yadavindra Singh Stadium, Mullanpur
Umpires: Keyur Kelkar (Ind) and Jayaraman Madanagopal (Ind)
Player of the match: Priyansh Arya (Punjab Kings)

- Lucknow Super Giants won the toss and elected to field.

Match 30
20 April 2026
19:30 (N)
Scorecard

Mumbai Indians; 199/5 (20 overs)	v	Gujarat Titans (H); 100 (15.5 overs)
Tilak Varma 101* (45); Kagiso Rabada 3/33 (4 overs)		Washington Sundar 26 (17); Ashwani Kumar 4/24 (4 overs)

Mumbai Indians won by 99 runs
Narendra Modi Stadium, Ahmedabad
Umpires: Abhijit Bhattacharya (Ind) and K. N. Ananthapadmanabhan (Ind)
Player of the match: Tilak Varma (Mumbai Indians)

- Gujarat Titans won the toss and elected to field.
- Krish Bhagat and Danish Malewar (Mumbai Indians) both made their T20 debuts.
- Hardik Pandya became the seventh player to score 2,000 runs for Mumbai Indians in IPL.
- Tilak Varma (Mumbai Indians) scored his maiden century in IPL.

Match 31
21 April 2026
19:30 (N)
Scorecard

Sunrisers Hyderabad (H); 242/2 (20 overs)	v	Delhi Capitals; 195/9 (20 overs)
Abhishek Sharma 135* (68); Axar Patel 1/23 (2 overs)		Nitish Rana 57 (30); Eshan Malinga 4/32 (4 overs)

Sunrisers Hyderabad won by 47 runs
Rajiv Gandhi Stadium, Hyderabad
Umpires: Anish Sahasrabudhe (Ind) and Vinod Seshan (Ind)
Player of the match: Abhishek Sharma (Sunrisers Hyderabad)

- Delhi Capitals won the toss and elected to field.
- Dilshan Madushanka (Sunrisers Hyderabad) made his IPL debut.

Match 32
22 April 2026
19:30 (N)
Scorecard

Rajasthan Royals; 159/6 (20 overs)	v	Lucknow Super Giants (H); 119 (18 overs)
Ravindra Jadeja 43* (29); Mohsin Khan 2/17 (4 overs)		Mitchell Marsh 55 (41); Jofra Archer 3/20 (4 overs)

Rajasthan Royals won by 40 runs
Ekana Cricket Stadium, Lucknow
Umpires: Ajitesh Argal (Ind) and Virender Sharma (Ind)
Player of the match: Ravindra Jadeja (Rajasthan Royals)

- Lucknow Super Giants won the toss and elected to field.

Match 33
23 April 2026
19:30 (N)
Scorecard

Chennai Super Kings; 207/6 (20 overs)	v	Mumbai Indians (H); 104 (19 overs)
Sanju Samson 101* (54); Allah Ghazanfar 2/25 (4 overs)		Tilak Varma 37 (29); Akeal Hosein 4/17 (4 overs)

Chennai Super Kings won by 103 runs
Wankhede Stadium, Mumbai
Umpires: Adrian Holdstock (SA) and Parashar Joshi (Ind)
Player of the match: Sanju Samson (Chennai Super Kings)

- Mumbai Indians won the toss and elected to field.
- Shardul Thakur replaced Mitchell Santner as a concussion substitute after the latter got injured during the first innings.
- This was Mumbai Indians' biggest defeat by a margin of runs.

Match 34
24 April 2026
19:30 (N)
Scorecard

Gujarat Titans; 205/3 (20 overs)	v	Royal Challengers Bengaluru (H); 206/5 (18.5 overs)
Sai Sudharsan 100 (58); Bhuvneshwar Kumar 1/31 (4 overs)		Virat Kohli 81 (44); Rashid Khan 2/49 (4 overs)

Royal Challengers Bengaluru won by 5 wickets
M. Chinnaswamy Stadium, Bengaluru
Umpires: Jayaraman Madanagopal (Ind) and Amit Rana (Ind)
Player of the match: Virat Kohli (Royal Challengers Bengaluru)

- Royal Challengers Bengaluru won the toss and elected to field.

Match 35
25 April 2026
15:30 (D/N)
Scorecard

Delhi Capitals (H); 264/2 (20 overs)	v	Punjab Kings; 265/4 (18.5 overs)
KL Rahul 152* (67); Arshdeep Singh 1/49 (4 overs)		Prabhsimran Singh 76 (26); Kuldeep Yadav 2/46 (4 overs)

Punjab Kings won by 6 wickets
Arun Jaitley Stadium, Delhi
Umpires: Ajitesh Argal (Ind) and Virender Sharma (Ind)
Player of the match: KL Rahul (Delhi Capitals)

- Delhi Capitals won the toss and elected to bat.
- KL Rahul (Delhi Capitals) scored the highest individual score by an Indian player in the history of IPL.

Match 36
25 April 2026
19:30 (N)
Scorecard

Rajasthan Royals (H); 228/6 (20 overs)	v	Sunrisers Hyderabad; 229/5 (18.3 overs)
Vaibhav Sooryavanshi 103 (37); Eshan Malinga 2/38 (4 overs)		Ishan Kishan 74 (31); Jofra Archer 2/34 (4 overs)

Sunrisers Hyderabad won by 5 wickets
Sawai Mansingh Stadium, Jaipur
Umpires: Kaushik Gandhi (Ind) and Nitin Menon (Ind)
Player of the match: Ishan Kishan (Sunrisers Hyderabad)

- Sunrisers Hyderabad won the toss and elected to field.
- Vaibhav Sooryavanshi (Rajasthan Royals) became the fastest player to score 1,000 runs in T20s, in terms of deliveries faced (473).

Match 37
26 April 2026
15:30 (D/N)
Scorecard

Chennai Super Kings (H); 158/7 (20 overs)	v	Gujarat Titans; 162/2 (16.4 overs)
Ruturaj Gaikwad 74* (60); Kagiso Rabada 3/25 (4 overs)		Sai Sudharsan 87 (46); Noor Ahmad 1/29 (4 overs)

Gujarat Titans won by 8 wickets
M. A. Chidambaram Stadium, Chennai
Umpires: K. N. Ananthapadmanabhan (Ind) and Adrian Holdstock (SA)
Player of the match: Kagiso Rabada (Gujarat Titans)

- Gujarat Titans won the toss and elected to field.
- This match was initially scheduled at Narendra Modi Stadium in Ahmedabad, but was swapped venues with match 66 due to the 2026 Gujarat local elections.

Match 38
26 April 2026
19:30 (N)
Scorecard

Kolkata Knight Riders; 155/7 (20 overs)	v	Lucknow Super Giants (H); 155/8 (20 overs)
Rinku Singh 83* (51); Mohsin Khan 5/23 (4 overs)		Rishabh Pant 42 (38); Vaibhav Arora 2/24 (4 overs)

Match tied (Kolkata Knight Riders won the Super Over)
Ekana Cricket Stadium, Lucknow
Umpires: Abhijeet Bengeri (Ind) and Keyur Kelkar (Ind)
Player of the match: Rinku Singh (Kolkata Knight Riders)

- Lucknow Super Giants won the toss and elected to field.
- Super Over: Lucknow Super Giants 1/2 (0.3 overs), Kolkata Knight Riders 4/0 (0.1 overs)

Match 39
27 April 2026
19:30 (N)
Scorecard

Delhi Capitals (H); 75 (16.3 overs)	v	Royal Challengers Bengaluru; 77/1 (6.3 overs)
Abishek Porel 30 (33); Josh Hazlewood 4/12 (3.3 overs)		Devdutt Padikkal 34* (13); Kyle Jamieson 1/42 (3 overs)

Royal Challengers Bengaluru won by 9 wickets
Arun Jaitley Stadium, Delhi
Umpires: Ajitesh Argal (Ind) and Sam Nogajski (Aus)
Player of the match: Josh Hazlewood (Royal Challengers Bengaluru)

- Royal Challengers Bengaluru won the toss and elected to field.
- Virat Kohli (Royal Challengers Bengaluru) scored his 9,000th run in IPL.
- Sahil Parakh (Delhi Capitals) made his IPL debut.

Match 40
28 April 2026
19:30 (N)
Scorecard

Punjab Kings (H); 222/4 (20 overs)	v	Rajasthan Royals; 228/4 (19.2 overs)
Marcus Stoinis 62* (22); Yash Raj Punja 2/41 (4 overs)		Donovan Ferreira 52* (26); Yuzvendra Chahal 3/36 (4 overs)

Rajasthan Royals won by 6 wickets
Maharaja Yadavindra Singh Stadium, Mullanpur
Umpires: Nitin Menon (Ind) and Tanmay Srivastava (Ind)
Player of the match: Donovan Ferreira (Rajasthan Royals)

- Rajasthan Royals won the toss and elected to field.

Match 41
29 April 2026
19:30 (N)
Scorecard

Mumbai Indians (H); 243/5 (20 overs)	v	Sunrisers Hyderabad; 249/4 (18.4 overs)
Ryan Rickelton 123* (55); Praful Hinge 2/54 (4 overs)		Travis Head 76 (30); Allah Ghazanfar 2/51 (4 overs)

Sunrisers Hyderabad won by 6 wickets
Wankhede Stadium, Mumbai
Umpires: Abhijeet Bengeri (Ind) and Jayaraman Madanagopal (Ind)
Player of the match: Heinrich Klaasen (Sunrisers Hyderabad)

- Mumbai Indians won the toss and elected to bat.
- Ryan Rickelton (Mumbai Indians) scored his maiden century in IPL.

Match 42
30 April 2026
19:30 (N)
Scorecard

Royal Challengers Bengaluru; 155 (19.2 overs)	v	Gujarat Titans (H); 158/6 (15.5 overs)
Devdutt Padikkal 40 (24); Arshad Khan 3/22 (3.2 overs)		Shubman Gill 43 (18); Bhuvneshwar Kumar 3/28 (4 overs)

Gujarat Titans won by 4 wickets
Narendra Modi Stadium, Ahmedabad
Umpires: K. N. Ananthapadmanabhan (Ind) and Adrian Holdstock (SA)
Player of the match: Jason Holder (Gujarat Titans)

- Gujarat Titans won the toss and elected to field.

Match 43
1 May 2026
19:30 (N)
Scorecard

Rajasthan Royals (H); 225/6 (20 overs)	v	Delhi Capitals; 226/3 (19.1 overs)
Riyan Parag 90 (50); Mitchell Starc 3/40 (4 overs)		KL Rahul 75 (40); Ravindra Jadeja 1/33 (3 overs)

Delhi Capitals won by 7 wickets
Sawai Mansingh Stadium, Jaipur
Umpires: Sam Nogajski (Aus) and Virender Sharma (Ind)
Player of the match: KL Rahul (Delhi Capitals)

- Rajasthan Royals won the toss and elected to bat.

Match 44
2 May 2026
19:30 (N)
Scorecard

Mumbai Indians; 159/7 (20 overs)	v	Chennai Super Kings (H); 160/2 (18.1 overs)
Naman Dhir 57 (37); Anshul Kamboj 3/32 (4 overs)		Ruturaj Gaikwad 67* (47); Jasprit Bumrah 1/20 (3 overs)

Chennai Super Kings won by 8 wickets
M. A. Chidambaram Stadium, Chennai
Umpires: Kaushik Gandhi (Ind) and Nitin Menon (Ind)
Player of the match: Ruturaj Gaikwad (Chennai Super Kings)

- Mumbai Indians won the toss and elected to bat.
- Ramakrishna Ghosh (Chennai Super Kings) and Raghu Sharma (Mumbai Indians) both made their IPL debuts.

Match 45
3 May 2026
15:30 (D/N)
Scorecard

Sunrisers Hyderabad (H); 165 (19 overs)	v	Kolkata Knight Riders; 169/3 (18.2 overs)
Travis Head 61 (28); Varun Chakravarthy 3/36 (4 overs)		Angkrish Raghuvanshi 59 (47); Sakib Hussain 1/17 (3 overs)

Kolkata Knight Riders won by 7 wickets
Rajiv Gandhi Stadium, Hyderabad
Umpires: Abhijeet Bengeri (Ind) and Jayaraman Madanagopal (Ind)
Player of the match: Varun Chakravarthy (Kolkata Knight Riders)

- Sunrisers Hyderabad won the toss and elected to bat.
- Smaran Ravichandran (Sunrisers Hyderabad) made his IPL debut.
- Sunil Narine (Kolkata Knight Riders) became the first overseas player to take 200 wickets in IPL.

Match 46
3 May 2026
19:30 (N)
Scorecard

Punjab Kings; 163/9 (20 overs)	v	Gujarat Titans (H); 167/6 (19.5 overs)
Suryansh Shedge 57 (29); Jason Holder 4/24 (4 overs)		Sai Sudharsan 57 (41); Arshdeep Singh 2/24 (4 overs)

Gujarat Titans won by 4 wickets
Narendra Modi Stadium, Ahmedabad
Umpires: K. N. Ananthapadmanabhan (Ind) and Parashar Joshi (Ind)
Player of the match: Jason Holder (Gujarat Titans)

- Gujarat Titans won the toss and elected to field.
- Nishant Sindhu (Gujarat Titans) made his IPL debut.

Match 47
4 May 2026
19:30 (N)
Scorecard

Lucknow Super Giants; 228/5 (20 overs)	v	Mumbai Indians (H); 229/4 (18.4 overs)
Nicholas Pooran 63 (21); Corbin Bosch 2/20 (2 overs)		Rohit Sharma 84 (44); Manimaran Siddharth 2/47 (4 overs)

Mumbai Indians won by 6 wickets
Wankhede Stadium, Mumbai
Umpires: Ajitesh Argal (Ind) and Sam Nogajski (Aus)
Player of the match: Ryan Rickelton (Mumbai Indians)

- Mumbai Indians won the toss and elected to field.
- Akshat Raghuwanshi (Lucknow Super Giants) made his IPL debut.

Match 48
5 May 2026
19:30 (N)
Scorecard

Delhi Capitals (H); 155/7 (20 overs)	v	Chennai Super Kings; 159/2 (17.3 overs)
Sameer Rizvi 40* (24); Noor Ahmad 2/22 (3 overs)		Sanju Samson 87* (52); Axar Patel 1/25 (4 overs)

Chennai Super Kings won by 8 wickets
Arun Jaitley Stadium, Delhi
Umpires: Kaushik Gandhi (Ind) and Tanmay Srivastava (Ind)
Player of the match: Sanju Samson (Chennai Super Kings)

- Delhi Capitals won the toss and elected to bat.

Match 49
6 May 2026
19:30 (N)
Scorecard

Sunrisers Hyderabad (H); 235/4 (20 overs)	v	Punjab Kings; 202/7 (20 overs)
Heinrich Klaasen 69 (43); Yuzvendra Chahal 1/32 (4 overs)		Cooper Connolly 107* (59); Pat Cummins 2/34 (4 overs)

Sunrisers Hyderabad won by 33 runs
Rajiv Gandhi Stadium, Hyderabad
Umpires: Keyur Kelkar (Ind) and Jayaraman Madanagopal (Ind)
Player of the match: Pat Cummins (Sunrisers Hyderabad)

- Punjab Kings won the toss and elected to field.
- Cooper Connolly (Punjab Kings) scored his maiden century in IPL.

Match 50
7 May 2026
19:30 (N)
Scorecard

Lucknow Super Giants (H); 209/3 (19 overs)	v	Royal Challengers Bengaluru; 203/6 (19 overs)
Mitchell Marsh 111 (56); Krunal Pandya 1/31 (4 overs)		Rajat Patidar 61 (31); Prince Yadav 3/33 (4 overs)

Lucknow Super Giants won by 9 runs (DLS method)
Ekana Cricket Stadium, Lucknow
Umpires: Parashar Joshi (Ind) and Akshay Totre (Ind)
Player of the match: Mitchell Marsh (Lucknow Super Giants)

- Royal Challengers Bengaluru won the toss and elected to field.
- The match was reduced to 19 overs per side due to rain.
- Royal Challengers Bengaluru were set a revised target of 213 runs from 19 overs due to rain.

Match 51
8 May 2026
19:30 (N)
Scorecard

Delhi Capitals (H); 142/8 (20 overs)	v	Kolkata Knight Riders; 147/2 (14.2 overs)
Pathum Nissanka 50 (29); Kartik Tyagi 2/25 (4 overs)		Finn Allen 100* (47); Axar Patel 1/27 (4 overs)

Kolkata Knight Riders won by 8 wickets
Arun Jaitley Stadium, Delhi
Umpires: Nitin Menon (Ind) and Rohan Pandit (Ind)
Player of the match: Finn Allen (Kolkata Knight Riders)

- Kolkata Knight Riders won the toss and elected to field.
- Finn Allen (Kolkata Knight Riders) scored his maiden century in IPL.

Match 52
9 May 2026
19:30 (N)
Scorecard

Gujarat Titans; 229/4 (20 overs)	v	Rajasthan Royals (H); 152 (16.3 overs)
Shubman Gill 84 (44); Brijesh Sharma 2/47 (4 overs)		Ravindra Jadeja 38 (25); Rashid Khan 4/33 (4 overs)

Gujarat Titans won by 77 runs
Sawai Mansingh Stadium, Jaipur
Umpires: Saiyed Khalid (Ind) and Virender Sharma (Ind)
Player of the match: Rashid Khan (Gujarat Titans)

- Rajasthan Royals won the toss and elected to field.

Match 53
10 May 2026
15:30 (D/N)
Scorecard

Lucknow Super Giants; 203/8 (20 overs)	v	Chennai Super Kings (H); 208/5 (19.2 overs)
Josh Inglis 85 (33); Jamie Overton 3/36 (4 overs)		Urvil Patel 65 (23); Shahbaz Ahmed 2/30 (3 overs)

Chennai Super Kings won by 5 wickets
M. A. Chidambaram Stadium, Chennai
Umpires: Keyur Kelkar (Ind) and Amit Rana (Ind)
Player of the match: Jamie Overton (Chennai Super Kings)

- Chennai Super Kings won the toss and elected to field.
- Lucknow Super Giants were eliminated as a result of this match.

Match 54
10 May 2026
19:30 (N)
Scorecard

Mumbai Indians; 166/7 (20 overs)	v	Royal Challengers Bengaluru (H); 167/8 (20 overs)
Tilak Varma 57 (42); Bhuvneshwar Kumar 4/23 (4 overs)		Krunal Pandya 73 (46); Corbin Bosch 4/26 (4 overs)

Royal Challengers Bengaluru won by 2 wickets
Shaheed Veer Narayan Singh Stadium, Raipur
Umpires: Rohan Pandit (Ind) and Tanmay Srivastava (Ind)
Player of the match: Bhuvneshwar Kumar (Royal Challengers Bengaluru)

- Royal Challengers Bengaluru won the toss and elected to field.
- Mumbai Indians were eliminated as a result of this match.

Match 55
11 May 2026
19:30 (N)
Scorecard

Punjab Kings (H); 210/5 (20 overs)	v	Delhi Capitals; 216/7 (19 overs)
Shreyas Iyer 59* (36); Madhav Tiwari 2/40 (4 overs)		Axar Patel 56 (30); Arshdeep Singh 2/21 (4 overs)

Delhi Capitals won by 3 wickets
HPCA Cricket Stadium, Dharamshala
Umpires: K. N. Ananthapadmanabhan (Ind) and Bhavesh Patel (Ind)
Player of the match: Madhav Tiwari (Delhi Capitals)

- Delhi Capitals won the toss and elected to field.
- Ben Dwarshuis (Punjab Kings) made his IPL debut.

Match 56
12 May 2026
19:30 (N)
Scorecard

Gujarat Titans (H); 168/5 (20 overs)	v	Sunrisers Hyderabad; 86 (14.5 overs)
Sai Sudharsan 61 (44); Praful Hinge 2/17 (4 overs)		Pat Cummins 19 (9); Jason Holder 3/20 (4 overs)

Gujarat Titans won by 82 runs
Narendra Modi Stadium, Ahmedabad
Umpires: Saiyed Khalid (Ind) and Virender Sharma (Ind)
Player of the match: Kagiso Rabada (Gujarat Titans)

- Sunrisers Hyderabad won the toss and elected to field.

Match 57
13 May 2026
19:30 (N)
Scorecard

Kolkata Knight Riders; 192/4 (20 overs)	v	Royal Challengers Bengaluru (H); 194/4 (19.1 overs)
Angkrish Raghuvanshi 71 (46); Bhuvneshwar Kumar 1/34 (4 overs)		Virat Kohli 105* (60); Kartik Tyagi 3/32 (4 overs)

Royal Challengers Bengaluru won by 6 wickets
Shaheed Veer Narayan Singh Stadium, Raipur
Umpires: Nitin Menon (Ind) and Rohan Pandit (Ind)
Player of the match: Virat Kohli (Royal Challengers Bengaluru)

- Royal Challengers Bengaluru won the toss and elected to field.
- Saurabh Dubey (Kolkata Knight Riders) made his IPL debut.
- Virat Kohli (Royal Challengers Bengaluru) became the fastest player to score 14,000 runs in T20s, in terms of innings played (409). He also became the first Indian player to score 10 centuries in T20s.

Match 58
14 May 2026
19:30 (N)
Scorecard

Punjab Kings (H); 200/8 (20 overs)	v	Mumbai Indians; 205/4 (19.5 overs)
Prabhsimran Singh 57 (32); Shardul Thakur 4/39 (4 overs)		Tilak Varma 75* (33); Azmatullah Omarzai 2/36 (4 overs)

Mumbai Indians won by 6 wickets
HPCA Cricket Stadium, Dharamshala
Umpires: K. N. Ananthapadmanabhan (Ind) and Bhavesh Patel (Ind)
Player of the match: Tilak Varma (Mumbai Indians)

- Mumbai Indians won the toss and elected to field.

Match 59
15 May 2026
19:30 (N)
Scorecard

Chennai Super Kings; 187/5 (20 overs)	v	Lucknow Super Giants (H); 188/3 (16.4 overs)
Kartik Sharma 71 (42); Akash Singh 3/26 (4 overs)		Mitchell Marsh 90 (38); Mukesh Choudhary 1/24 (3 overs)

Lucknow Super Giants won by 7 wickets
Ekana Cricket Stadium, Lucknow
Umpires: Ulhas Gandhe (Ind) and Tony Ematty (Ind)
Player of the match: Mitchell Marsh (Lucknow Super Giants)

- Lucknow Super Giants won the toss and elected to field.

Match 60
16 May 2026
19:30 (N)
Scorecard

Kolkata Knight Riders (H); 247/2 (20 overs)	v	Gujarat Titans; 218/4 (20 overs)
Finn Allen 93 (35); Sai Kishore 1/38 (3 overs)		Shubman Gill 85 (49); Sunil Narine 2/29 (4 overs)

Kolkata Knight Riders won by 29 runs
Eden Gardens, Kolkata
Umpires: Virender Sharma (Ind) and Kannur Swaroopanand (Ind)
Player of the match: Sunil Narine (Kolkata Knight Riders)

- Gujarat Titans won the toss and elected to field.
- Kolkata Knight Riders became the second IPL team to play in 100 matches at a home venue.
- Sunil Narine (Kolkata Knight Riders) became the first overseas player to play in 200 IPL matches.
- Cameron Green (Kolkata Knight Riders) scored his 1,000th run in IPL.

Match 61
17 May 2026
15:30 (N)
Scorecard

Royal Challengers Bengaluru; 222/4 (20 overs)	v	Punjab Kings (H); 199/8 (20 overs)
Venkatesh Iyer 73* (40); Harpreet Brar 2/35 (4 overs)		Shashank Singh 56 (27); Rasikh Salam 3/36 (4 overs)

Royal Challengers Bengaluru won by 23 runs
HPCA Cricket Stadium, Dharamshala
Umpires: K. N. Ananthapadmanabhan (Ind) and Adrian Holdstock (SA)
Player of the match: Venkatesh Iyer (Royal Challengers Bengaluru)

- Punjab Kings won the toss and elected to field.
- Shreyas Iyer (Punjab Kings) played in his 100th IPL match as a captain.
- Royal Challengers Bengaluru qualified for the playoffs as a result of this match.

Match 62
17 May 2026
19:30 (N)
Scorecard

Rajasthan Royals; 193/8 (20 overs)	v	Delhi Capitals (H); 197/5 (19.2 overs)
Dhruv Jurel 53 (40); Mitchell Starc 4/40 (4 overs)		KL Rahul 56 (42); Jofra Archer 2/35 (4 overs)

Delhi Capitals won by 5 wickets
Arun Jaitley Stadium, Delhi
Umpires: Amit Rana (Ind) and Keyur Kelkar (Ind)
Player of the match: Mitchell Starc (Delhi Capitals)

- Delhi Capitals won the toss and elected to field.
- Ravi Singh (Rajasthan Royals) and Tripurana Vijay (Delhi Capitals) both made their IPL debuts.

Match 63
18 May 2026
19:30 (N)
Scorecard

Chennai Super Kings (H); 180/7 (20 overs)	v	Sunrisers Hyderabad; 181/5 (19 overs)
Dewald Brevis 44 (27); Pat Cummins 3/28 (4 overs)		Ishan Kishan 70 (47); Mukesh Choudhary 2/36 (4 overs)

Sunrisers Hyderabad won by 5 wickets
M. A. Chidambaram Stadium, Chennai
Umpires: Nitin Menon (Ind) and Tanmay Srivastava (Ind)
Player of the match: Ishan Kishan (Sunrisers Hyderabad)

- Chennai Super Kings won the toss and elected to bat.
- Sunrisers Hyderabad and Gujarat Titans qualified for the playoffs as a result of this match.

Match 64
19 May 2026
19:30 (N)
Scorecard

Lucknow Super Giants; 220/5 (20 overs)	v	Rajasthan Royals (H); 225/3 (19.1 overs)
Mitchell Marsh 96 (57); Yash Raj Punja 2/35 (4 overs)		Vaibhav Sooryavanshi 93 (38); Mohsin Khan 1/31 (4 overs)

Rajasthan Royals won by 7 wickets
Sawai Mansingh Stadium, Jaipur
Umpires: Adrian Holdstock (SA) and Parashar Joshi (Ind)
Player of the match: Vaibhav Sooryavanshi (Rajasthan Royals)

- Rajasthan Royals won the toss and elected to field.
- Sushant Mishra (Rajasthan Royals) made his IPL debut.

Match 65
20 May 2026
19:30 (N)
Scorecard

Mumbai Indians; 147/8 (20 overs)	v	Kolkata Knight Riders (H); 148/6 (18.5 overs)
Corbin Bosch 32* (18); Cameron Green 2/23 (3 overs)		Manish Pandey 45 (33); Corbin Bosch 3/30 (3 overs)

Kolkata Knight Riders won by 4 wickets
Eden Gardens, Kolkata
Umpires: Saiyed Khalid (Ind) and Kannur Swaroopanand (Ind)
Player of the match: Manish Pandey (Kolkata Knight Riders)

- Kolkata Knight Riders won the toss and elected to field.
- Tejasvi Singh Dahiya (Kolkata Knight Riders) made his IPL debut. He replaced Angkrish Raghuvanshi as a concussion substitute after the batter got injured during the first innings.

Match 66
21 May 2026
19:30 (N)
Scorecard

Gujarat Titans (H); 229/4 (20 overs)	v	Chennai Super Kings; 140 (13.4 overs)
Sai Sudharsan 84 (53); Mukesh Choudhary 1/36 (4 overs)		Shivam Dube 47 (17); Rashid Khan 3/18 (2 overs)

Gujarat Titans won by 89 runs
Narendra Modi Stadium, Ahmedabad
Umpires: Kaushik Gandhi (Ind) and Nitin Menon (Ind)
Player of the match: Mohammed Siraj (Gujarat Titans)

- Chennai Super Kings won the toss and elected to field.
- This match was initially scheduled at M. A. Chidambaram Stadium in Chennai, but was swapped venues with match 37 due to the 2026 Gujarat local elections.
- Chennai Super Kings were eliminated as a result of this match.

Match 67
22 May 2026
19:30 (N)
Scorecard

Sunrisers Hyderabad (H); 255/4 (20 overs)	v	Royal Challengers Bengaluru; 200/4 (20 overs)
Ishan Kishan 79 (46); Rasikh Salam 2/52 (4 overs)		Rajat Patidar 56 (39); Eshan Malinga 2/33 (4 overs)

Sunrisers Hyderabad won by 55 runs
Rajiv Gandhi Stadium, Hyderabad
Umpires: Jayaraman Madanagopal (Ind) and Amit Rana (Ind)
Player of the match: Ishan Kishan (Sunrisers Hyderabad)

- Sunrisers Hyderabad won the toss and elected to bat.
- Rajat Patidar (Royal Challengers Bengaluru) became the fastest Indian player to score 100 sixes in IPL.

Match 68
23 May 2026
19:30 (N)
Scorecard

Lucknow Super Giants (H); 196/6 (20 overs)	v	Punjab Kings; 200/3 (18 overs)
Josh Inglis 72 (44); Yuzvendra Chahal 2/25 (4 overs)		Shreyas Iyer 101* (51); Mohammed Shami 2/45 (4 overs)

Punjab Kings won by 7 wickets
Ekana Cricket Stadium, Lucknow
Umpires: Kaushik Gandhi (Ind) and Vinod Seshan (Ind)
Player of the match: Shreyas Iyer (Punjab Kings)

- Punjab Kings won the toss and elected to field.
- Shreyas Iyer (Punjab Kings) scored his 7,000th run in T20s and his maiden century in IPL.
- Delhi Capitals were eliminated as a result of this match.

Match 69
24 May 2026
15:30 (D/N)
Scorecard

Rajasthan Royals; 205/8 (20 overs)	v	Mumbai Indians (H); 175/9 (20 overs)
Dhruv Jurel 38 (26); Shardul Thakur 2/41 (4 overs)		Suryakumar Yadav 60 (42); Jofra Archer 3/17 (4 overs)

Rajasthan Royals won by 30 runs
Wankhede Stadium, Mumbai
Umpires: Tony Ematty (Ind) and Rohan Pandit (Ind)
Player of the match: Jofra Archer (Rajasthan Royals)

- Mumbai Indians won the toss and elected to field.
- Rajasthan Royals qualified for the playoffs while Punjab Kings and Kolkata Knight Riders were eliminated as a result of this match.

Match 70
24 May 2026
19:30 (N)
Scorecard

Delhi Capitals; 203/5 (20 overs)	v	Kolkata Knight Riders (H); 163 (18.4 overs)
KL Rahul 60 (30); Saurabh Dubey 2/28 (4 overs)		Ajinkya Rahane 63 (39); Lungi Ngidi 3/27 (3.4 overs)

Delhi Capitals won by 40 runs
Eden Gardens, Kolkata
Umpires: Saiyed Khalid (Ind) and Kannur Swaroopanand (Ind)
Player of the match: Kuldeep Yadav (Delhi Capitals)

- Kolkata Knight Riders won the toss and elected to field.

== Playoffs ==
=== Bracket ===
Qualifier 1
26 May 2026 – Dharamshala
1	Royal Challengers Bengaluru	254/5 (20 overs)
2	Gujarat Titans	162 (19.3 overs)
Eliminator
27 May 2026 – Mullanpur
3	Sunrisers Hyderabad	196 (19.2 overs)
4	Rajasthan Royals	243/8 (20 overs)

Qualifier 2
29 May 2026 – Mullanpur
Q1L	Gujarat Titans	219/3 (18.4 overs)
EW	Rajasthan Royals	214/6 (20 overs)

Final
31 May 2026 – Ahmedabad
Q1W	Royal Challengers Bengaluru	161/5 (18 overs)
Q2W	Gujarat Titans	155/8 (20 overs)

- Sources: ESPNcricinfo

=== Qualifier 1 ===
Qualifier 1
26 May 2026
19:30 (N)
Scorecard

Royal Challengers Bengaluru; 254/5 (20 overs)	v	Gujarat Titans; 162 (19.3 overs)
Rajat Patidar 93* (33); Jason Holder 2/39 (4 overs)		Rahul Tewatia 68 (43); Jacob Duffy 3/39 (4 overs)

Royal Challengers Bengaluru won by 92 runs
HPCA Cricket Stadium, Dharamshala
Umpires: Jayaraman Madanagopal (Ind) and Virender Sharma (Ind)
Player of the match: Rajat Patidar (Royal Challengers Bengaluru)

- Gujarat Titans won the toss and elected to field.
- Virat Kohli (Royal Challengers Bengaluru) became the first player to score over 600 runs in four consecutive IPL seasons.
- Royal Challengers Bengaluru's 254 was the highest innings total in IPL playoffs.
- Royal Challengers Bengaluru qualified for their second consecutive and overall fifth IPL final.

=== Eliminator ===
Eliminator
27 May 2026
19:30 (N)
Scorecard

Rajasthan Royals; 243/8 (20 overs)	v	Sunrisers Hyderabad; 196 (19.2 overs)
Vaibhav Sooryavanshi 97 (29); Praful Hinge 3/54 (4 overs)		Nitish Kumar Reddy 38 (20); Jofra Archer 3/58 (4 overs)

Rajasthan Royals won by 47 runs
Maharaja Yadavindra Singh International Cricket Stadium, Mullanpur
Umpires: Ulhas Gandhe (Ind) and Adrian Holdstock (SA)
Player of the match: Vaibhav Sooryavanshi (Rajasthan Royals)

- Sunrisers Hyderabad won the toss and elected to field.
- Vaibhav Sooryavanshi (Rajasthan Royals) broke Chris Gayle's record (59) for most sixes in a single IPL season.

=== Qualifier 2 ===
Qualifier 2
29 May 2026
19:30 (N)
Scorecard

Rajasthan Royals; 214/6 (20 overs)	v	Gujarat Titans; 219/3 (18.4 overs)
Vaibhav Sooryavanshi 96 (47); Jason Holder 2/27 (4 overs)		Shubman Gill 104 (53); Nandre Burger 1/35 (4 overs)

Gujarat Titans won by 7 wickets
Maharaja Yadavindra Singh International Cricket Stadium, Mullanpur
Umpires: Sam Nogajski (Aus) and Rohan Pandit (Ind)
Player of the match: Shubman Gill (Gujarat Titans)

- Rajasthan Royals won the toss and elected to bat.
- Vaibhav Sooryavanshi (Rajasthan Royals) became the fastest Indian player to score 1,000 runs in IPL, in terms of innings (23).
- Gujarat Titans qualified for their third IPL final.

=== Final ===
Final
31 May 2026
19:30 (N)
Scorecard

Gujarat Titans; 155/8 (20 overs)	v	Royal Challengers Bengaluru; 161/5 (18 overs)
Washington Sundar 50* (37); Rasikh Salam 3/27 (4 overs)		Virat Kohli 75* (42); Rashid Khan 2/25 (4 overs)

Royal Challengers Bengaluru won by 5 wickets
Narendra Modi Stadium, Ahmedabad
Umpires: K. N. Ananthapadmanabhan (Ind) and Nitin Menon (Ind)
Player of the match: Virat Kohli (Royal Challengers Bengaluru)

- Royal Challengers Bengaluru won the toss and elected to field.
- Royal Challengers Bengaluru won their second IPL title after 2025. They also became the third team to win two consecutive IPL finals; and the first team to win the IPL and the Women's Premier League in the same year.

== Statistics and awards ==
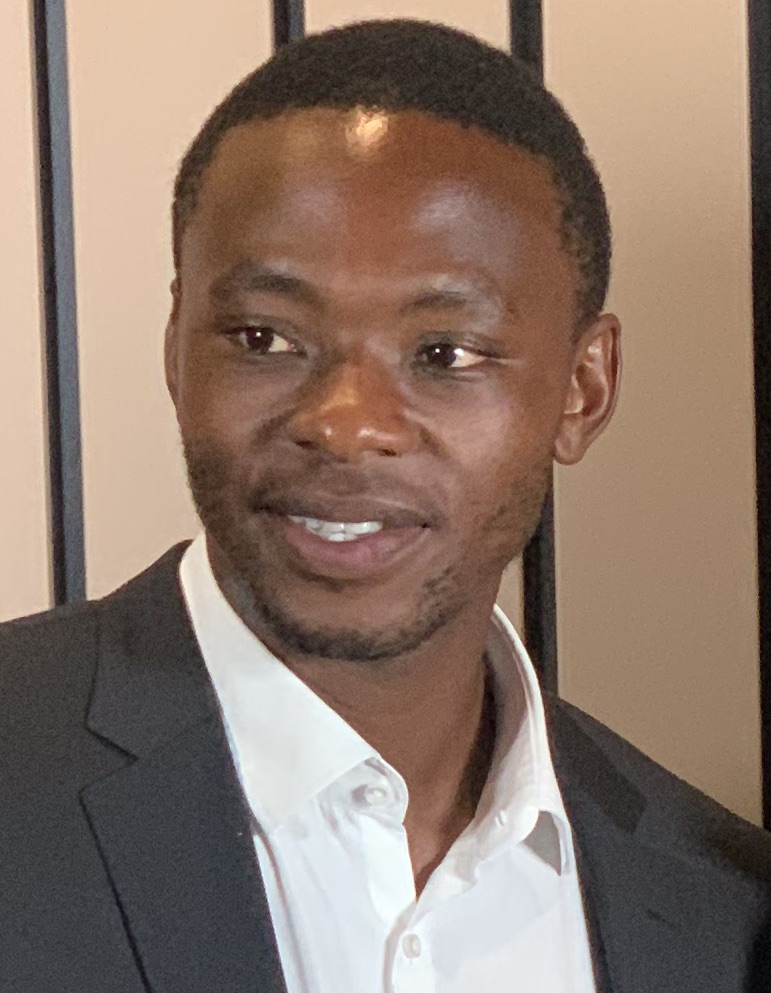
Kagiso Rabada (pictured in 2021) took the most wickets (29) in the season.

Most runs
Runs	Player	Team
776	Vaibhav Sooryavanshi	Rajasthan Royals
732	Shubman Gill	Gujarat Titans
722	Sai Sudharsan	Gujarat Titans
675	Virat Kohli	Royal Challengers Bengaluru
624	Heinrich Klaasen	Sunrisers Hyderabad

Most wickets
Wickets	Player	Team
29	Kagiso Rabada	Gujarat Titans
28	Bhuvneshwar Kumar	Royal Challengers Bengaluru
25	Jofra Archer	Rajasthan Royals
21	Rashid Khan	Gujarat Titans
21	Anshul Kamboj	Chennai Super Kings

Most valuable player
Points	Player	Team
436.5	Vaibhav Sooryavanshi	Rajasthan Royals
427.0	Kagiso Rabada	Gujarat Titans
396.5	Jofra Archer	Rajasthan Royals
379.5	Bhuvneshwar Kumar	Royal Challengers Bengaluru
369.5	Shubman Gill	Gujarat Titans

=== End of season awards ===
End of season awards
Award	Prize	Player	Team
Most Valuable Player	₹10 lakh (US$11,000) and trophy	Vaibhav Sooryavanshi	Rajasthan Royals
Orange Cap (most runs)	₹10 lakh (US$11,000)	Vaibhav Sooryavanshi	Rajasthan Royals
Purple Cap (most wickets)	₹10 lakh (US$11,000)	Kagiso Rabada	Gujarat Titans
Emerging player of the season	₹10 lakh (US$11,000) and trophy	Vaibhav Sooryavanshi	Rajasthan Royals
Most fours	₹10 lakh (US$11,000) and trophy	Sai Sudharsan	Gujarat Titans
Most sixes	₹10 lakh (US$11,000) and trophy	Vaibhav Sooryavanshi	Rajasthan Royals
Most dot balls	₹10 lakh (US$11,000) and trophy	Mohammed Siraj	Gujarat Titans
Highest batting strike rate	₹10 lakh (US$11,000), trophy and a car	Vaibhav Sooryavanshi	Rajasthan Royals
Catch of the season	₹10 lakh (US$11,000) and trophy	Manish Pandey	Kolkata Knight Riders
Best pitch	₹50 lakh (US$53,000)	Eden Gardens, Kolkata	—N/a
Team fairplay award	₹10 lakh (US$11,000)	—N/a	Punjab Kings
Runners-up	₹12.5 crore (US$1.3 million) and runners-up shield	—N/a	Gujarat Titans
Champions	₹20 crore (US$2.1 million) and IPL trophy	—N/a	Royal Challengers Bengaluru

== See also ==
- 2026 Women's Premier League (cricket)
- 2026 Women's Premier League (cricket) final
