= Sushant =

Sushant may refer to:

- Sushant Divgikar, an Indian model and actor
- Susant Mani, Indian film director
- Sushant Marathe, Indian cricketer
- Sushant Mishra (born 2000), Indian cricketer
- Sushant Modani (born 1989), Indian-American cricketer
- Sushant Shukla, Indian politician
- Sushant Singh (disambiguation)
  - Sushant Singh (born 1972), an Indian actor
  - Sushant Singh Rajput (1986–2020), an Indian actor
- Sushant City, Jaipur, neighbourhood of Jaipur, Rajasthan, India
- Sushant University, formerly Sushant School of Art and Architecture, private university in Haryana, India
- Sushant KC (born 1997), Nepalese Singer

== See also ==
- Susanta, alternative form of the Indian male given name
  - Sushanta Borgohain, Indian politician
  - Sushanta Chowdhury, Indian politician
  - Sushanta Deb, Indian politician
  - Sushanta Kumar Dattagupta, Indian physicist
  - Sushanta Mahato, Indian politician
  - Sushanta Mitra, Indian-Canadian mechanical engineer
- Susanto, an Indonesian surname
