= Sushant Singh (disambiguation) =

Sushant Singh (born 1972) is an Indian actor.

Sushant Singh may also refer to:

- Sushant Singh Rajput (1986–2020), Indian film and television actor
- Kunwar Sushant Singh (born 1988), Indian politician

== See also ==
- Sushant (disambiguation)
