= Anand Lok, Jaipur =

Anand Lok
- New Colony
- Country: India
- State: Jaipur

Area
  - Total: 3 km^{2} (1.2 sq mi)

Population
  - Total: 100
  - Density: 33/km^{2} (86/sq mi)

Languages
- Time zone: UTC+5:30 (IST)
- Nearest city: Sushant City, Jaipur

Anand Lok, Kalwar Road, Jaipur is a newly developed colony on the west outskirts of Jaipur. It is on Kalwar Road, Jaipur just 4 km ahead of Sushant city. Its total area is around 37 acres.

The colony was built by urban developer Ansal API from 2006 to 2010.

== Nearby colonies ==
Nearby colonies are Sushant City, Jaipur, Kalwad, Global City, Anand Lok Extension, Sukh Sagar Enclave, Jaipur, Govindpura, Ganesh Nagar Extn, Amrit Kunj Residential Scheme, and Jaipur.

The nearest Jaipur metro station is Ambabari Metro Station which is 16.5 km, Pani Pech Station & Subhash Nagar Station on Orange Metro Line.

Sambhar Salt Lake is India's largest inland salt lake to the 52.4 km west of Anand Lok, Kalwar Road, Jaipur.

== Nearest schools/colleges ==
1. Spring Dales School, Sushant city
2. Biyani Engineering College Jaipur
3. Sri Kalyan World School
4. Global International Academy
5. M P S
6. Vedanta International School

== Distance from basic amenities ==
1. Airport: 32.0 km
2. Main Jaipur Railway Station: 21.0 km
3. City center: 18.0 km

== Rail stations ==
1. Dhankya Railway Rail Station, 7.0 km - 10 mins drive
2. Kanakpura Railway Station, 14.0 km - 19 mins drive
3. Dher Ka Balaji Rail Station,16.6 km - 20 mins drive
4. Jaipur Railway Rail Station, 20.5 km - 27 mins drive
5. Nindar Benard Rail Station, 17.3 km - 28 mins drive
6. Bais Godam Rail Station, 25.0 km - 32 mins drive
