= Susanta =

Susanta is a given name. Notable people with the name include:

- Susanta Chakraborty (born 1940), Indian politician
- Susanta Ghosh, Indian politician
- Susanta Ghosh (politician), Indian politician
- Susanta Singh (born 1973), Indian politician

== See also ==
- Susana (disambiguation)
