= Sushant City, Jaipur =

Sushant City
- colony
- Country: India
- State: Rajasthan

Area
  - Total: 3 km^{2} (1.2 sq mi)

Population
  - Total: 5,300
  - Density: 1,800/km^{2} (4,600/sq mi)

Languages
  - Official: Hindi
- Time zone: UTC+5:30 (IST)
- PIN: 302012
- Nearest city: Jaipur

Sushant City, Jaipur is a newly developed colony on the outskirt of Jaipur. It is on Kalwar Road, Jaipur just 5 km ahead of Govindpura, Jaipur. Development has started picking up around the area and land prices have also gone up. Plot size starts from 200 yards and goes up to 900 square yards. The society is not yet fully JDA approved. The layout of the society is well planned and is spacious with parks and green belt area on major roads of the society .

Nearby colonies are Anand Lok, Kalwad, Global City, Anand Lok Extension, Sukh Sagar Englave, Govindpura, Ganesh Nagar Extn to name few. The city is yet not properly ready to settle in.

== Nearest schools/colleges ==
1. Spring Dales School, Sushant City
2. Sufal Vidya Peeth School
3. Care International School
4. Tulip Public School
5. Shri Krishna Secondary School
6. Biyani Engineering College Jaipur
7. Sri Kalyan World School
8. Global International Academy
