= Prabhsimran Singh =

Indian cricketer (born 2000)

Personal information
- Born: 10 August 2000 (age 26); Patiala, Punjab, India
- Height: 1.68 m (5 ft 6 in)
- Batting: Right-handed
- Role: Wicket-keeper-batter
- Relatives: Anmolpreet Singh (cousin)

Domestic team information
- Years: Team
- 2018/19–present: Punjab
- 2019–present: Punjab Kings

Career statistics
Competition	FC	LA	T20
Matches	27	51	115
Runs scored	1,522	1,952	3,155
Batting average	38.05	45.39	30.63
100s/50s	5/4	6/9	2/21
Top score	202	167	119*
Catches/stumpings	30/1	46/6	45/15
Medal record
Men's cricket
Representing India
Asian Games
Gold medal – first place	2022 Hangzhou
U19 Asia Cup
Winner	2018 Bangladesh
- Source: ESPNcricinfo, 3 January 2026

Prabhsimran Singh (born 10 August 2000) is an Indian cricketer. He represents Punjab in domestic cricket and Punjab Kings in the Indian Premier League.

== Early life ==
Prabhsimran Singh was born on 10 August 2000 in Patiala, Punjab. He began playing cricket at the age of eight and rose through the age-group levels in Punjab. He is the cousin of fellow Punjab and IPL cricketer Anmolpreet Singh.

== Career ==
He made his List A debut for the India Emerging Team against the Afghanistan Emerging Team in the 2018 ACC Emerging Teams Asia Cup on 7 December 2018. Later the same month, he was bought by the Kings XI Punjab in the player auction for the 2019 Indian Premier League. He made his Twenty20 debut for Punjab in the 2018–19 Syed Mushtaq Ali Trophy on 21 February 2019. In the 2020 IPL auction, he was bought again by the Kings XI Punjab ahead of the 2020 Indian Premier League. In February 2022, he was again bought by the Punjab Kings in the auction for the 2022 Indian Premier League tournament. He made his first-class debut on 17 February 2022, for Punjab in the 2021–22 Ranji Trophy, where he scored a century.

He was part of the Punjab team that won the 2023–24 Syed Mushtaq Ali Trophy. In the 2024 IPL, he was retained by Punjab Kings and scored 334 runs at a strike rate of 156.80. In the 2025 IPL, he had a breakthrough season, scoring 549 runs in 17 innings at a strike rate of 160.53, including four half-centuries. During the tournament, he became the seventh player to reach 1,000 runs for the franchise. Ahead of the 2026 season, he was retained by Punjab Kings for ₹4 crore. In the early stages of the tournament, he recorded scores of 80 (39) against Mumbai Indians and 51 (25) against Sunrisers Hyderabad. In domestic cricket, he scored 443 runs for Punjab in nine matches during the 2025–26 Vijay Hazare Trophy, including five half-centuries.
