= Vijaykumar Vyshak =

Indian cricketer (born 1997)

Personal information
- Born: 31 January 1997 (age 29); Bangalore, Karnataka, India
- Height: 5 ft 10 in (178 cm)
- Batting: Right-handed
- Bowling: Right arm medium
- Role: Bowler

Domestic team information
- Years: Team
- 2021–present: Karnataka
- 2023–2024: Royal Challengers Bengaluru
- 2025–present: Punjab Kings

Career statistics
Competition	FC	LA	T20
Matches	28	26	49
Runs scored	538	98	66
Batting average	16.81	19.60	6.60
100s/50s	1/1	0/1	0/0
Top score	103*	54	13*
Balls bowled	4,941	1,239	1,044
Wickets	108	38	61
Bowling average	24.39	33.00	25.52
5 wickets in innings	3	0	0
10 wickets in match	0	0	0
Best bowling	5/59	4/22	3/5
Catches/stumpings	4/–	5/–	10/–
- Source: Cricinfo, 31 December 2025

Vijaykumar Vyshak (born 31 January 1997) is an Indian cricketer who plays for Karnataka in domestic cricket and Punjab Kings in the Indian Premier League.

He made his List A debut on 24 February 2021, for Karnataka in the 2020–21 Vijay Hazare Trophy. He made his Twenty20 debut on 5 November 2021, for Karnataka in the 2021–22 Syed Mushtaq Ali Trophy. He made his first-class debut on 17 February 2022, for Karnataka in the 2021–22 Ranji Trophy.

On 7 April 2023, Royal Challengers Bangalore signed Vyshak Vijay Kumar as a replacement for Rajat Patidar for 2023 Indian Premier League.

On 15 April 2023, he made IPL debut against Delhi Capitals in 2023 Indian Premier League.
