= Sushant Mishra =

Indian cricketer (born 2000)

Personal information
- Full name: Sushant Samirkumar Mishra
- Born: 23 December 2000 (age 25); Ranchi, Jharkhand, India
- Batting: Left-handed
- Bowling: Left arm medium fast
- Role: Bowler

Domestic team information
- Years: Team
- 2021/22–: Jharkhand
- 2026–: Rajasthan Royals
- Source: ESPNcricinfo, 8 December 2021

Sushant Mishra (born 23 December 2000) is an Indian cricketer. He represents Jharkhand in domestic cricket and Rajasthan Royals in the Indian Premier League. Prior to his List A debut, he was named in India's squad for the 2020 Under-19 Cricket World Cup. He made his List A debut on 8 December 2021, for Jharkhand in the 2021–22 Vijay Hazare Trophy. Mishra made his first-class debut on 17 February 2022, for Jharkhand in the 2021–22 Ranji Trophy. In the 2024 IPL auction, Mishra was bought by Gujarat Titans for Rs 2.20 crore. In the 2026 IPL auction, Mishra was bought by Rajasthan Royals for Rs 90 lakhs.
