= Praful Hinge =

Indian cricketer (born 2002)

Personal information
- Full name: Praful Prakash Hinge
- Born: 18 January 2002 (age 24); Nagpur, Maharashtra, India
- Height: 1.9 m (6 ft 3 in)
- Batting: Right-handed
- Bowling: Right-arm medium-fast
- Role: Bowler

Domestic team information
- Years: Team
- 2024–present: Vidarbha
- 2026–present: Sunrisers Hyderabad

Career statistics
Competition	FC	LA	T20
Matches	10	6	8
Runs scored	101	2	3
Batting average	11.22	-	3
100s/50s	0/0	0/0	0/0
Top score	40	2*	3
Balls bowled	1515	300	180
Wickets	27	5	15
Bowling average	26.66	60.60	21.86
5 wickets in innings	0	0	0
10 wickets in match	0	0	0
Best bowling	4/60	2/54	4/34
Catches/stumpings	4/–	1/–	3/–
- Source: , 28 August 2026

Praful Prakash Hinge (born 18 January 2002) is an Indian cricketer who represents Vidarbha in domestic cricket and Sunrisers Hyderabad in the Indian Premier League. He is a right-arm medium-fast bowler and a right-handed batsman.

== Early life ==
Hinge was born on 18 January 2002 in Nagpur, Maharashtra. Coming from a middle class background, his father, Prakash Hinge, was a government employee in Maharashtra State Electricity Board. Praful began playing tennis ball cricket on the streets. At age 13, having no idea what real leather-ball cricket even was, he convinced his reluctant father to let him join a local summer cricket camp. He later joined Reshmibagh Cricket Academy in Nagpur.

He moved to the MRF Pace Foundation in Chennai and under the supervision of legendary Australian fast bowler Glenn McGrath and former Indian pacer Varun Aaron, he rebuilt his body and refined his mechanics.

== Career ==
Hinge made his first-class debut for Vidarbha against Puducherry in the 2024–25 Ranji Trophy on 18 October 2024. He finished his Ranji Trophy season with 11 wickets in 4 matches.

He later on made his List A debut for Vidarbha against Mizoram in the 2024-25 Vijay Hazare Trophy on 5 January 2025. He made his T20 debut for Vidarbha against Andhra in the 2025-26 Syed Mushtaq Ali Trophy on 8 December 2025.

In the 2026 IPL Auction, he was picked up by Sunrisers Hyderabad for a price of ₹30 Lakhs.

He made his Indian Premier League debut against Rajasthan Royals on 13 April 2026. He dismissed top-order batsmen Vaibhav Sooryavanshi, Lhuan-dre Pretorius and Dhruv Jurel in his first over of his IPL career and set a record of becoming the first ever bowler in nineteen years of IPL history to take 3 wickets in the first over of the innings. He later also dismissed the RR captain Riyan Parag in his second over. He finished the match with 4/34 and won the Player of the match award. He took a total of 14 wickets in 7 matches and helped SRH to reach the Eliminator of the tournament.
