= Tanmay Srivastava =

Indian cricketer (born 1989)

Personal information
- Full name: Tanmay Manoj Srivastava
- Born: 7 November 1989 (age 37); Kanpur, Uttar Pradesh, India
- Nickname: Toshu
- Batting: Left-handed
- Bowling: Right-arm medium
- Role: Top-order batsman

Domestic team information
- Years: Team
- 2006–2019: Uttar Pradesh
- 2008–2010: Kings XI Punjab
- 2011: Kochi Tuskers Kerala
- 2012: Deccan Chargers

Career statistics
| Competition | FC | LA | T20 |
|---|---|---|---|
| Matches | 90 | 44 | 34 |
| Runs scored | 4,918 | 1,728 | 649 |
| Batting average | 34.39 | 44.30 | 28.21 |
| 100s/50s | 10/27 | 7/50 | 0/4 |
| Top score | 179 | 124* | 84* |
| Balls bowled | 246 | 40 | 24 |
| Wickets | 3 | 0 | 0 |
| Bowling average | 48.33 | – | – |
| 5 wickets in innings | 0 | – | – |
| 10 wickets in match | 0 | – | – |
| Best bowling | 1/4 | – | – |
| Catches/stumpings | 60/– | 15/– | 9/– |
- Source: ESPNcricinfo, 24 October 2020

Tanmay Manoj Srivastava (born 7 November 1989) is an Indian cricket umpire and former cricketer. Srivastava was a member of the Indian U-19 cricket team that won the 2008 U/19 Cricket World Cup tournament played in Malaysia. He scored 262 runs in six matches in that tournament. In first-class cricket, he represented Uttar Pradesh. He was the leading run scorer for Uttar Pradesh in this format in 2008–09 season.

Srivastava had been contracted by Kings XI Punjab in the Indian Premier League from 2008 to 2010. He moved to Kochi Tuskers Kerala for the 2011 season. Since Kochi Tuskers Kerala has been terminated from Indian Premier League, Tanmay moved to Deccan Chargers for the 2012 season.

On 24 October 2020, Srivastava announced his retirement from cricket.

On 28 April 2026, he debuted as an on field umpire in the Indian Premier League. He had previously served as a fourth umpire in the 2025 edition of the tournament.
