= Ajitesh Argal =

Indian cricketer (born 1988)

Personal information
- Full name: Ajitesh Kamlesh Argal
- Born: 21 September 1988 (age 38); Bhopal, Madhya Pradesh, India
- Batting: Right-handed
- Bowling: Right-arm medium

Domestic team information
- Years: Team
- 2008/09–2015: Baroda
- 2008: Punjab Kings

Career statistics
Competition	FC	LA	T20
Matches	10	3	6
Runs scored	78	2	33
Batting average	6.50	1.00	8.25
100s/50s	0/0	0/0	0/0
Top score	17	1	19
Balls bowled	1,300	107	132
Wickets	24	1	4
Bowling average	31.29	113.00	50.75
5 wickets in innings	0	0	0
10 wickets in match	0	–	–
Best bowling	4/59	1/50	2/42
Catches/stumpings	5/–	0/–	3/–
- Source: ESPNcricinfo, 1 March 2025

Ajitesh Argal (born 21 September 1988 in Bhopal) is an Indian former cricketer. He is a right-handed medium pace bowler and lower-order batsman. Argal was a member of the Indian U-19 cricket team that won the 2008 U/19 Cricket World Cup tournament played in Malaysia. He was the man of the match in the final, for taking 2 wickets for 7 runs in his 5 overs.

Argal was contracted by the Kings XI Punjab for the Indian Premier League 2008. Later Argal was recruited as an Inspector in the Income Tax department through sports quota.
