= 2023 Gujarat Titans season =

Overview of Gujarat Titans 2023

Gujarat Titans
2023 season
- Coach: Ashish Nehra
- Captain: Hardik Pandya
- Ground(s): Narendra Modi Stadium, Motera, Ahmedabad
- 2023 Indian Premier League: Runners-up
- Most runs: Shubman Gill (890)
- Most wickets: Mohammed Shami (28)

The 2023 season was the 2nd season for the Indian Premier League franchise Gujarat Titans. They were one of ten teams to compete in the 2023 Indian Premier League. The side have won the IPL title once before.

== Background ==
=== Team anthem ===
The team anthem used to be 'Aava De'. In the first 2022 IPL season, the song was sung by Aditya Gadhvi.

=== Home ground ===
The team's home ground is Narendra Modi Stadium, which is situated in Motera, Gujarat.

== Seasons ==
Year	League table standing	Final standing
2022	1st out of 10	Champions
2023	1st out of 10	Runners-up

== Squad ==
- Players with international caps are listed in **bold**
- Ages given as of 31 March 2023, the first match of the season

No.	Name	Nationality	Birth date	Batting style	Bowling style	Signed year	Salary	Notes
Batters
9	Rahul Tewatia	India	20 May 1993 (aged 29)	Left-handed	Right-arm leg break	2022	₹9 crore (US$930,000)	
7	**Shubman Gill**	India	8 September 1999 (aged 23)	Right-handed	Right-arm off break	2022	₹8 crore (US$830,000)	Vice Captain
10	**David Miller**	South Africa	10 June 1989 (aged 33)	Left-handed	Right-arm off break	2022	₹3 crore (US$310,000)	Overseas
18	Abhinav Manohar	India	16 September 1994 (aged 28)	Right-handed	Right-arm leg break	2022	₹2.6 crore (US$270,000)	
23	Sai Sudharsan	India	15 October 2001 (aged 21)	Left-handed	Right-arm leg break	2022	₹20 lakh (US$21,000)	
	**Kane Williamson**	New Zealand	8 August 1990 (aged 32)	Right-handed	Right-arm off break	2023	₹2 crore (US$210,000)	Overseas
	Urvil Patel	India	17 October 1998 (aged 24)	Right-handed	–	2023	₹20 lakh (US$21,000)	
	**Dasun Shanaka**	Sri Lanka	9 September 1991 (aged 31)	Right-handed	Right-arm medium	2023	–	Overseas; Replacement for Kane Williamson
Wicket-keepers
6	**Wriddhiman Saha**	India	24 October 1984 (aged 38)	Right-handed	–	2022	₹1.9 crore (US$200,000)	
13	**Matthew Wade**	Australia	26 December 1987 (aged 35)	Left-handed	–	2022	₹2.4 crore (US$250,000)	Overseas
14	**K. S. Bharat**	India	3 October 1993 (aged 29)	Right-handed	–	2023	₹1.2 crore (US$120,000)	
All-rounders
59	**Vijay Shankar**	India	26 January 1991 (aged 32)	Right-handed	Right-arm medium	2022	₹1.4 crore (US$150,000)	
33	**Hardik Pandya**	India	11 October 1993 (aged 29)	Right-handed	Right-arm medium-fast	2022	₹15 crore (US$1.6 million)	Captain
Spin bowlers
19	**Rashid Khan**	Afghanistan	20 September 1998 (aged 24)	Right-handed	Right-arm leg break	2022	₹15 crore (US$1.6 million)	Overseas,
1	Ravisrinivasan Sai Kishore	India	6 November 1996 (aged 26)	Left-handed	Left-arm orthodox	2022	₹3 crore (US$310,000)	
22	**Jayant Yadav**	India	20 January 1990 (aged 33)	Right-handed	Right-arm off-break	2022	₹1.7 crore (US$180,000)	
15	**Noor Ahmad**	Afghanistan	3 January 2005 (aged 18)	Right-handed	Left-arm unorthodox	2022	₹30 lakh (US$31,000)	Overseas
Pace bowlers
11	**Mohammed Shami**	India	3 September 1990 (aged 32)	Right-handed	Right-arm fast	2022	₹6.25 crore (US$650,000)	
133	Yash Dayal	India	13 December 1997 (aged 25)	Left-handed	Left-arm fast-medium	2022	₹3.20 crore (US$330,000)	
8	**Alzarri Joseph**	West Indies	20 November 1996 (aged 26)	Right-handed	Right-arm fast medium	2022	₹2.4 crore (US$250,000)	Overseas
12	Pradeep Sangwan	India	5 November 1990 (aged 32)	Right-handed	Left-arm medium	2022	₹20 lakh (US$21,000)	
04	Darshan Nalkande	India	4 October 1998 (aged 24)	Right-handed	Right-arm fast-medium	2022	₹20 lakh (US$21,000)	
	**Shivam Mavi**	India	26 November 1998 (aged 24)	Right-handed	Right-arm fast	2023	₹6 crore (US$620,000)	
82	**Josh Little**	Ireland	1 November 1999 (aged 23)	Right-handed	Left-arm medium-fast	2023	₹4.4 crore (US$460,000)	Overseas
27	**Mohit Sharma**	India	18 September 1988 (aged 34)	Right-handed	Right-arm medium	2023	₹50 lakh (US$52,000)	
	**Odean Smith**	West Indies	1 November 1996 (aged 26)	Right-handed	Right-arm fast-medium	2023	₹50 lakh (US$52,000)	Overseas

- Source: Gujarat Titans

== Administration and support staff ==
Position	Name
COO	Arvinder Singh
Team manager	Satyajit Parab
Director of cricket	Vikram Solanki
Head coach	Ashish Nehra
Assistant coach	Mithun Manhas
Assistant coach	Narender Negi
Batting coach and mentor	Gary Kirsten
Spin bowling coach and scout	Aashish Kapoor
Head physiotherapist	Rohit Sawalkar

- Source: Gujarat Titans

== Points table ==
Pos	Grp	Team	Pld	W	L	NR	Pts	NRR	Qualification
1	B	Gujarat Titans (R)	14	10	4	0	20	0.809	Advanced to Qualifier 1
2	B	Chennai Super Kings (C)	14	8	5	1	17	0.652	Advanced to Qualifier 1
3	A	Lucknow Super Giants (4th)	14	8	5	1	17	0.284	Advanced to Eliminator
4	A	Mumbai Indians (3rd)	14	8	6	0	16	−0.044	Advanced to Eliminator
5	A	Rajasthan Royals	14	7	7	0	14	0.148	
6	B	Royal Challengers Bangalore	14	7	7	0	14	0.135	
7	A	Kolkata Knight Riders	14	6	8	0	12	−0.239	
8	B	Punjab Kings	14	6	8	0	12	−0.304	
9	A	Delhi Capitals	14	5	9	0	10	−0.808	
10	B	Sunrisers Hyderabad	14	4	10	0	8	−0.590	

Source: Indian Premier League

The four top-ranked teams will qualify for the Playoffs.
Advance to Qualifier 1
Advance to Eliminator

== League stage ==
The schedule for the group stages was published on 17 February 2023.

=== Matches ===
Match 1
31 March 2023
19:30 (N)
Scorecard

Chennai Super Kings; 178/7 (20 overs)	v	Gujarat Titans (H); 182/5 (19.2 overs)
Ruturaj Gaikwad 92 (50); Rashid Khan 2/26 (4 overs)		Shubman Gill 63 (36); Rajvardhan Hangargekar 3/36 (4 overs)

Gujarat Titans won by 5 wickets
Narendra Modi Stadium, Ahmedabad
Umpires: Saiyed Khalid (Ind) and Nitin Menon (Ind)
Player of the match: Rashid Khan (Gujarat Titans)

- Gujarat Titans won the toss and elected to field.
- Impact Player Subs: Tushar Deshpande for Ambati Rayudu (Chennai Super Kings) and Sai Sudharsan for Kane Williamson (Gujarat Titans).

Match 7
4 April 2023
19:30 (N)
Scorecard

Delhi Capitals (H); 162/8 (20 overs)	v	Gujarat Titans; 163/4 (18.1 overs)
David Warner 37 (32); Rashid Khan 3/31 (4 overs)		Sai Sudharsan 62* (48); Anrich Nortje 2/39 (4 overs)

Gujarat Titans won by 6 wickets
Arun Jaitley Stadium, Delhi
Umpires: Sadashiv Iyer (Ind) and Nand Kishore (Ind)
Player of the match: Sai Sudharsan (Gujarat Titans)

- Gujarat Titans won the toss and elected to field.
- Impact player Subs: Khaleel Ahmed for Sarfaraz Khan (Delhi Capitals) and Vijay Shankar for Josh Little (Gujarat Titans).

Match 13
9 April 2023
15:30 (D/N)
Scorecard

Gujarat Titans (H); 204/4 (20 overs)	v	Kolkata Knight Riders; 207/7 (20 overs)
Vijay Shankar 63* (24); Sunil Narine 3/33 (4 overs)		Rinku Singh 48* (21); Rashid Khan 3/37 (4 overs)

Kolkata Knight Riders won by 3 wickets
Narendra Modi Stadium, Ahmedabad
Umpires: Nitin Menon (Ind) and Tapan Sharma (Ind)
Player of the match: Rinku Singh (Kolkata Knight Riders)

- Gujarat Titans won the toss and elected to bat.
- Impact player subs: Josh Little for Sai Sudharshan (Gujarat Titans) and Venkatesh Iyer for Suyash Sharma (Kolkata Knight Riders)

Match 18
13 April 2023
19:30 (N)
Scorecard

Punjab Kings (H); 153/8 (20 overs)	v	Gujarat Titans; 154/4 (19.5 overs)
Matt Short 36 (24); Mohit Sharma 2/18 (4 overs)		Shubman Gill 67 (49); Harpreet Brar 1/20 (4 overs)

Gujarat Titans won by 6 wickets
Inderjit Singh Bindra Stadium, Mohali
Umpires: Jayaraman Madanagopal (Ind) and Akshay Totre (Ind)
Player of the match: Mohit Sharma (Gujarat Titans)

- Gujarat Titans won the toss and elected to field.

Match 23
16 April 2023
19:30 (N)
Scorecard

Gujarat Titans (H); 177/7 (20 overs)	v	Rajasthan Royals; 179/7 (19.2 overs)
David Miller 46 (30); Sandeep Sharma 2/25 (4 overs)		Sanju Samson 60 (32); Mohammed Shami 3/25 (4 overs)

Rajasthan Royals won by 3 wickets
Narendra Modi Stadium, Ahmedabad
Umpires: Anil Chaudhary (Ind) and Chris Gaffaney (NZ)
Player of the match: Shimron Hetmyer (Rajasthan Royals)

- Rajasthan Royals won the toss and elected to field.

Match 30
22 April 2023
15:30 (N)
Scorecard

Gujarat Titans; 135/6 (20 overs)	v	Lucknow Super Giants (H); 128/7 (20 overs)
Hardik Pandya 66 (50); Krunal Pandya 2/16 (4 overs)		KL Rahul 68 (61); Mohit Sharma 2/17 (3 overs)

Gujarat Titans won by 7 runs
BRSABV Ekana Cricket Stadium, Lucknow
Umpires: Akshay Totre (Ind) and Rod Tucker (Aus)
Player of the match: Mohit Sharma (Gujarat Titans)

- Gujarat Titans won the toss and elected to bat.
- Impact Player subs: Prerak Mankad for Amit Mishra (Lucknow Super Giants) and Jayant Yadav for Shubman Gill (Gujarat Titans)

Match 35
25 April 2023
19:30 (N)
Scorecard

Gujarat Titans (H); 207/6 (20 overs)	v	Mumbai Indians; 152/9 (20 overs)
Shubman Gill 56 (34); Piyush Chawla 2/34 (4 overs)		Nehal Wadhera 40 (21); Noor Ahmed 3/37 (4 overs)

Gujarat Titans won by 55 runs
Narendra Modi Stadium, Ahmedabad
Umpires: Anil Chaudhary (Ind) and Nand Kishore (Ind)
Player of the match: Abhinav Manohar (Gujarat Titans)

- Mumbai Indians won the toss and elected to field.
- Impact Player subs: Josh Little for Shubman Gill (Gujarat Titans) and Tilak Varma for Kumar Kartikeya (Mumbai Indians)

Match 39
29 April 2023
15:30 (D/N)
Scorecard

Kolkata Knight Riders (H); 179/7 (20 overs)	v	Gujarat Titans; 180/3 (17.5 overs)
Rahmanullah Gurbaz 81 (39); Mohammed Shami 3/33 (4 overs)		Vijay Shankar 51* (24); Sunil Narine 1/24 (3 overs)

Gujarat Titans won by 7 wickets
Eden Gardens, Kolkata
Umpires: Chris Gaffaney (NZ) and Nikhil Patwardhan (Ind)
Player of the match: Josh Little (Gujarat Titans)

- Gujarat Titans won the toss and elected to field.
- Impact Player subs: Suyash Sharma for Venkatesh Iyer (Kolkata Knight Riders) and Shubman Gill for Mohit Sharma (Gujarat Titans)

Match 44
2 May 2023
19:30 (N)
Scorecard

Delhi Capitals; 130/8 (20 overs)	v	Gujarat Titans (H); 125/6 (20 overs)
Aman Hakim Khan 51 (44); Mohammed Shami 4/11 (4 overs)		Hardik Pandya 59* (53); Ishant Sharma 2/23 (4 overs)

Delhi Capitals won by 5 runs
Narendra Modi Stadium, Ahmedabad
Umpires: Michael Gough (Ind) and Rohan Pandit (Ind)
Player of the match: Mohammed Shami (Gujarat Titans

- Delhi Capitals won the toss and elected to bat.
- Impact Player subs: Khaleel Ahmed for Priyam Garg (Delhi Capitals) and Shubman Gill for Mohit Sharma (Gujarat Titans)

Match 48
5 May 2023
19:30 (N)
Scorecard

Rajasthan Royals (H); 118 (17.5 overs)	v	Gujarat Titans; 119/1 (13.5 overs)
Sanju Samson 30 (20); Rashid Khan 3/14 (4 overs)		Wriddhiman Saha 41* (34); Yuzvendra Chahal 1/22 (3.5)

Gujarat Titans won by 9 wickets
Sawai Mansingh Stadium, Jaipur
Umpires: Saiyed Khalid (Ind) and Virender Sharma (Ind)
Player of the match: Rashid Khan (Gujarat Titans)

- Rajasthan Royals won the toss and elected to bat.
- Impact Player subs: Riyan Parag for Yashasvi Jaiswal (Rajasthan Royals) and Shubman Gill for Mohit Sharma (Gujarat Titans)

Match 51
7 May 2023
15:30 (D/N)
Scorecard

Gujarat Titans (H); 227/2 (20 overs)	v	Lucknow Super Giants; 171/7 (20 overs)
Shubman Gill 94* (51); Avesh Khan 1/34 (4 overs)		Quinton de Kock 70 (41); Mohit Sharma 4/29 (4 overs)

Gujarat Titans won by 56 runs
Narendra Modi Stadium, Ahmedabad
Umpires: Anil Chaudhary (Ind) and Nand Kishore (Ind)
Player of the match: Shubman Gill (Gujarat Titans)

- Lucknow Super Giants won the toss and elected to field.

Match 57
12 May 2023
19:30 (N)
Scorecard

Mumbai Indians (H); 218/5 (20 overs)	v	Gujarat Titans; 191/8 (20 overs)
Suryakumar Yadav 103* (49); Rashid Khan 4/30 (4 overs)		Rashid Khan 79* (32); Akash Madhwal 3/31 (4 overs)

Mumbai Indians won by 27 runs
Wankhede Stadium, Mumbai
Umpires: Nitin Menon (Ind) and Tapan Sharma (Ind)
Player of the match: Suryakumar Yadav (Mumbai Indians)

- Gujarat Titans won the toss and elected to field.
- Impact Player subs: Akash Madhwal for Vishnu Vinod (Mumbai Indians) and Shubman Gill for Mohit Sharma (Gujarat Titans)

Match 62
15 May 2023
19:30 (N)
Scorecard

Gujarat Titans (H); 188/9 (20 overs)	v	Sunrisers Hyderabad; 154/9 (20 overs)
Shubman Gill 101 (58); Bhuvneshwar Kumar 5/30 (4 overs)		Heinrich Klaasen 64 (44); Mohammed Shami 4/21 (4 overs)

Gujarat Titans won by 34 runs
Narendra Modi Stadium, Ahmedabad
Umpires: Ulhas Gandhe (Ind) and Jayaraman Madanagopal (Ind)
Player of the match: Shubman Gill (Gujarat Titans)

- Sunrisers Hyderabad won the toss and elected to field.
- Impact Player Subs: Shubman Gill for Yash Dayal (Gujarat Titans) and Anmolpreet Singh for T. Natarajan (Sunrisers Hyderabad)

Match 70
21 May 2023
19:30 (N)
Scorecard

Royal Challengers Bangalore (H)	v	Gujarat Titans

M. Chinnaswamy Stadium, Bengaluru
Umpires: Nitin Menon (Ind) and Virender Sharma (Ind)

== Playoffs ==
The full schedule for the playoffs was announced on 21 April 2023.

Qualifier 1 / Eliminator
23 May 2023 - Chennai
1	Gujarat Titans	157 (20 overs)
2	Chennai Super Kings	172/7 (20 overs)
24 May 2023 - Chennai
3	Lucknow Super Giants	101 (16.3 overs)
4	Mumbai Indians	182/8 (20 overs)

Qualifier 2
26 May 2023 - Ahmedabad
Q1L	Gujarat Titans	233/3 (20 overs)
EW	Mumbai Indians	171 (18.2 overs)

Final
29 May 2023 - Ahmedabad
Q1W	Chennai Super Kings	171/5 (15 overs)
Q2W	Gujarat Titans	214/4 (20 overs)

=== Qualifier 1 ===
23 May 2023
19:30 (N)
Scorecard

Chennai Super Kings; 172/7 (20 overs)	v	Gujarat Titans; 157 (20 overs)
Ruturaj Gaikwad 60 (44); Mohammed Shami 2/28 (4 overs)		Shubman Gill 42 (38); Ravindra Jadeja 2/18 (4 overs)

Chennai Super Kings won by 15 runs
M. A. Chidambaram Stadium, Chennai
Umpires: Anil Chaudhary (Ind) and Chris Gaffaney (NZ)
Player of the match: Ruturaj Gaikwad (Chennai Super Kings)

- Gujarat Titans won the toss and elected to field.
- Chennai Super Kings qualified for the final for the 10th time in IPL history.

=== Eliminator ===
24 May 2023
19:30 (N)
Scorecard

Mumbai Indians; 182/8 (20 overs)	v	Lucknow Super Giants; 101 (16.3 overs)
Cameron Green 41 (23); Naveen-ul-Haq 4/38 (4 overs)		Marcus Stoinis 40 (27); Akash Madhwal 5/5 (3.3 overs)

Mumbai Indians won by 81 runs
M. A. Chidambaram Stadium, Chennai
Umpires: Bruce Oxenford (Aus) and Virender Sharma (Ind)
Player of the match: Akash Madhwal (Mumbai Indians)

- Mumbai Indians won the toss and elected to bat.

=== Qualifier 2 ===
26 May 2023
19:30 (N)
Scorecard

Gujarat Titans; 233/3 (20 overs)	v	Mumbai Indians; 171 (18.2 overs)
Shubman Gill 129 (60); Piyush Chawla 1/45 (3 overs)		Suryakumar Yadav 61 (38); Mohit Sharma 5/10 (2.2 overs)

Gujarat Titans won by 62 runs
Narendra Modi Stadium, Ahmedabad
Umpires: Nitin Menon (Ind) and Rod Tucker (Aus)
Player of the match: Shubman Gill (Gujarat Titans)

- Mumbai Indians won the toss and elected to field.
- Shubman Gill (Gujarat Titans) made the highest individual score of 129 runs from 60 balls in IPL Playoffs.
- Gujarat Titans's total was the highest score in IPL Playoffs.

=== Final ===
29–30 May 2023
19:30 (N)
Scorecard

Gujarat Titans; 214/4 (20 overs)	v	Chennai Super Kings; 171/5 (15 overs)
Sai Sudharsan 96 (47); Matheesha Pathirana 2/44 (4 overs)		Devon Conway 47 (25); Mohit Sharma 3/36 (3 overs)

Chennai Super Kings won by 5 wickets (DLS method)
Narendra Modi Stadium, Ahmedabad
Umpires: Nitin Menon (Ind) and Rod Tucker (Aus)
Player of the match: Devon Conway (Chennai Super Kings)

- Chennai Super Kings won the toss and elected to field.
- The match was originally scheduled to be held on 28 May 2023, but it was shifted to 29 May 2023 and ended on 30th May 2023 at 01:35 IST due to rain. Thus, becoming the longest ever IPL final.
- Chennai Super Kings were set a revised target of 171 runs from 15 overs due to rain.
- By winning in the final, Chennai Super Kings equaled Mumbai Indians for winning the most IPL trophies (5).

== Road to final ==
League progression
Team	Group matches														Playoffs		
Team	1	2	3	4	5	6	7	8	9	10	11	12	13	14	Q1/E	Q2	F
Gujarat Titans	2	4	4	6	6	8	10	12	12	14	16	16	18	20	L	W	L

Win	Loss	No result

- Note: The total points at the end of each group match are listed.
- Note: Click on the points (group matches) or W/L (playoffs) to see the match summary.
