= 2027 Chennai Super Kings season =

Indian Premier League cricket team

Chennai Super Kings
2027 season
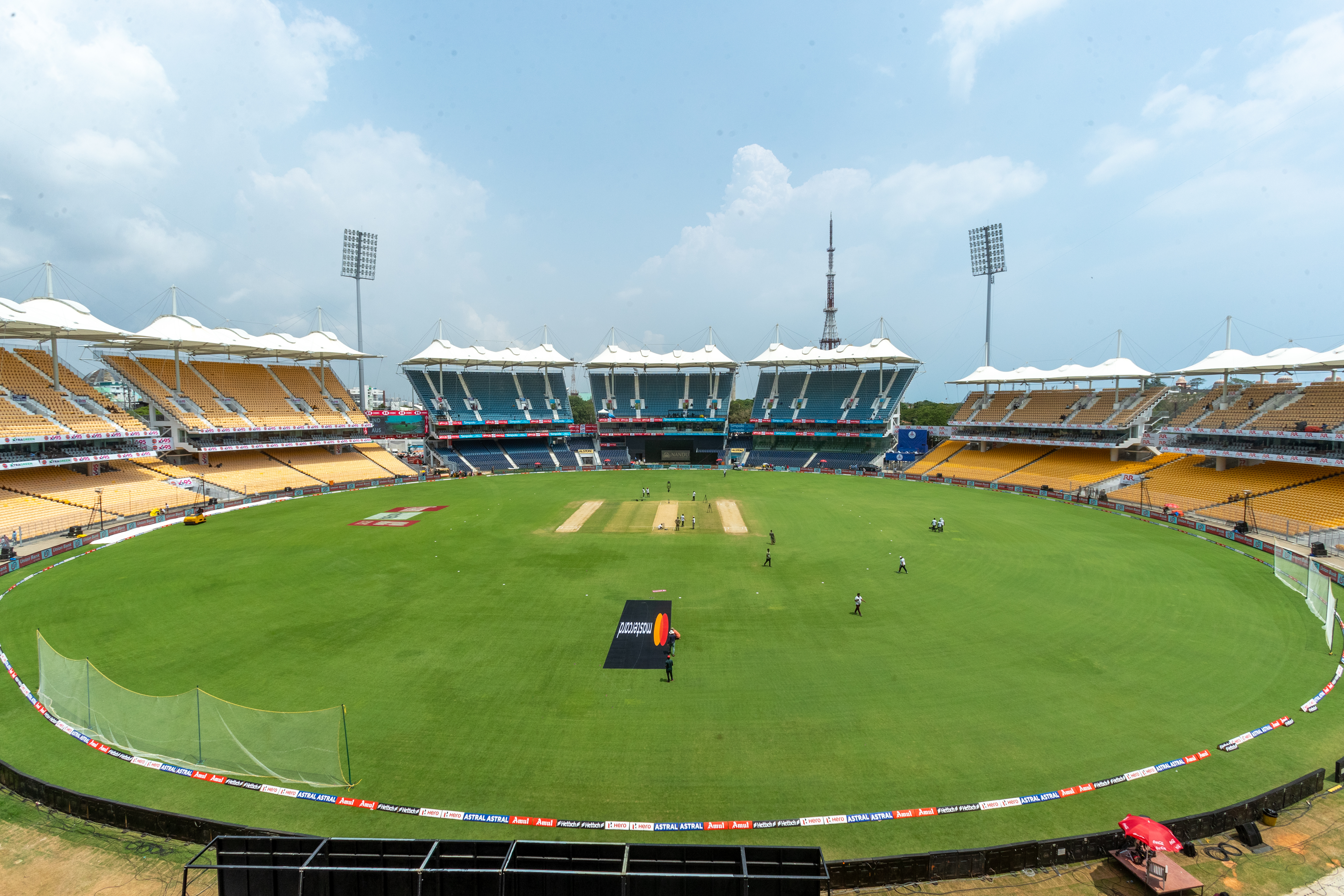
- M. A. Chidambaram Stadium, home ground of Chennai Super Kings
- Coach: Zaheer Khan
- Captain: Ruturaj Gaikwad
- Ground(s): M. A. Chidambaram Stadium, Chennai

The 2027 season was Chennai Super Kings' eighteenth appearance in the Indian Premier League (IPL). The team was captained by Ruturaj Gaikwad and coached by Zaheer Khan after ending their 18 years journey with Stephen Fleming.

== Pre-season ==
The 2027 Indian Premier League was the 20th edition of the Indian Premier League (IPL), a professional Twenty20 (T20) cricket league held in India, organised by the Board of Control for Cricket in India (BCCI). Chennai Super Kings are the joint-most successful franchise with 5 title wins. Chennai Super Kings appointed Zaheer Khan as their Head Coach after parting ways with Stephen Fleming, a fresh start for the Super Kings ahead of the 2027 season

=== Player retention ===
The ten franchises were allowed to retain any number of players from their squad, including traded players and players signed as replacements.

On the day of retention announcement, the Chennai Super Kings made it official that their former Captain MS Dhoni who led their team to 5 IPL and 2 Champions League Titles has retired from IPL and takes up a new role as Mentor of the Team

The franchises were required to submit their retention lists before 17 November 2026. Chennai Super Kings retained 19 players ahead of the 2027 season.

Chennai Super Kings have also traded Khaleel Ahmed along with Nathan Ellis to Sunrisers Hyderabad in return for Liam Livingstone and Jack Edwards.

Retained players
No.	Player	Nationality	Salary
1	Ruturaj Gaikwad	India	₹18 crore (US$1.9 million)
2	Sanju Samson	India	₹18 crore (US$1.9 million)
3	Kartik Sharma	India	₹14.2 crore (US$1.5 million)
4	Shivam Dube	India	₹12 crore (US$1.3 million)
5	Noor Ahmad	Afghanistan	₹10 crore (US$1.1 million)
6	Liam Livingstone	England	₹6 crore (US$640,000)
7	Rahul Chahar	India	₹5.2 crore (US$560,000)
8	Anshul Kamboj	India	₹3.4 crore (US$360,000)
9	Jack Edwards	Australia	₹3 crore (US$320,000)
10	Dewald Brevis	South Africa	₹2.2 crore (US$240,000)
11	Gurjapneet Singh	India	₹2.2 crore (US$240,000)
12	Akeal Hosein	West Indies	₹2 crore (US$210,000)
13	Jamie Overton	England	₹1.5 crore (US$160,000)
14	Sarfaraz Khan	India	₹75 lakh (US$80,000)
15	Mukesh Choudhary	India	₹30 lakh (US$32,000)
16	Ramakrishna Ghosh	India	₹30 lakh (US$32,000)
17	Shreyas Gopal	India	₹30 lakh (US$32,000)
18	Ayush Mhatre	India	₹30 lakh (US$32,000)
19	Urvil Patel	India	₹30 lakh (US$32,000)

Released players
No.	Player	Nationality	Salary	Notes
1	Prashant Veer	India	₹14.2 crore (US$1.5 million)	
2	Khaleel Ahmed	India	₹4.8 crore (US$510,000)	Traded
3	MS Dhoni	India	₹4 crore (US$430,000)	Retired
4	Nathan Ellis	Australia	₹2 crore (US$210,000)	Traded
5	Matt Henry	New Zealand	₹2 crore (US$210,000)	
6	Matthew Short	Australia	₹1.5 crore (US$160,000)	
7	Spencer Johnson	Australia	₹1.5 crore (US$160,000)	Replacement
8	Zak Foulkes	New Zealand	₹75 lakh (US$80,000)	
9	Dian Forrester	South Africa	₹75 lakh (US$80,000)	Replacement
10	Aman Khan	India	₹40 lakh (US$43,000)	
11	Akash Madhwal	India	₹30 lakh (US$32,000)	Replacement
12	Macneil Noronha	India	₹30 lakh (US$32,000)	Replacement
13	Kuldip Yadav	India	₹30 lakh (US$32,000)	Replacement

== Support staff ==
Chennai Super Kings made a complete revamp to the Coaching Staff ahead of the 2027 season.

Position	Name
Head coach	Zaheer Khan
Mentor	MS Dhoni
Assistant Coach	Gareth Batty
Assistant Coach	Albie Morkel
Assistant Coach	Sridharan Sriram
Bowling coach	Mohit Sharma
Fielding coach	James Foster
