= 2023 Indian Premier League =

Cricket tournament

- Tournament logo
- Dates: 31 March 2023 – 30 May 2023
- Administrator: Board of Control for Cricket in India (BCCI)
- Cricket format: Twenty20
- Tournament format(s): Group stage and playoffs
- Champions: Chennai Super Kings (5th title)
- Runners-up: Gujarat Titans
- Participants: 10
- Matches: 74
- Most valuable player: Shubman Gill (Gujarat Titans)
- Most runs: Shubman Gill (Gujarat Titans) (890)
- Most wickets: Mohammed Shami (Gujarat Titans) (28)
- Official website: iplt20.com

The 2023 Indian Premier League (also known as Tata IPL 2023 for sponsorship reasons and sometimes referred to as IPL 2023 or IPL 16) was the 16th season of the Indian Premier League, a franchise Twenty20 cricket league in India. It is organised by the Board of Control for Cricket in India. The tournament was played from 31 March 2022 to 30 May 2023.

In the final, Chennai Super Kings defeated Gujarat Titans, by five wickets (DLS method) to win their fifth league title.

== Background ==
The league returned to its original home-and-away format after a four-year hiatus. Due to the COVID-19 pandemic, the previous three seasons were held at neutral venues. "Fan parks" were organised in 45 cities, events which last occurred in 2019, (Note: In fan parks, the league installs a large screen where audiences can watch matches.) and an opening ceremony took place for the first time with performances from Arijit Singh, Tamannaah Bhatia, and Rashmika Mandanna.

=== Format ===
The teams are divided into two groups (A and B) of five teams. Each team plays twice against all five teams in the other group (home and away), and once against all four of the teams in its own group. All teams play seven home and seven away games.

Group A	Group B
Mumbai Indians	Chennai Super Kings
Kolkata Knight Riders	Sunrisers Hyderabad
Rajasthan Royals	Gujarat Titans
Delhi Capitals	Royal Challengers Bangalore
Lucknow Super Giants	Punjab Kings

=== Rules ===
A number of new laws have been introduced in this season:

- A penalty of five runs if unfair movement by a fielder or wicketkeeper occurs as a ball being delivered and before it is received by the batsman. The dead ball will also be declared.
- Teams can be declared after the toss.
- An "Impact Player" rule allowing teams to substitute a player during a match from four named substitutes. (Note: The Impact Player can only be an Indian player unless there are less than 4 overseas players in the Playing XI.)
- If a team fails to bowl their 20 overs in the allocated time, only four fielders will be allowed outside of the fielding restrictions circle for the remainder of the innings.
- Teams can review balls for wides and no-balls using the Decision Review System (DRS). This change was first used during the 2023 Women's Premier League.

== Teams ==
The same 10 teams from the previous season returned with few changes to the team personnel.

Franchise	Head coach	Captain
Chennai Super Kings	Stephen Fleming	MS Dhoni
Delhi Capitals	Ricky Ponting	David Warner
Gujarat Titans	Ashish Nehra	Hardik Pandya (Note: Rashid Khan captained GT for their match vs. KKR when Hardik Pandya was ruled out.)
Kolkata Knight Riders	Chandrakant Pandit	Nitish Rana
Lucknow Super Giants	Andy Flower	KL Rahul (Note: Krunal Pandya captained LSG after KL Rahul was ruled out due to injury in the match against RCB)
Mumbai Indians	Mark Boucher	Rohit Sharma (Note: Suryakumar Yadav captained MI for their match vs. KKR in which Sharma was added as an Impact Player due to injury.)
Punjab Kings	Trevor Bayliss	Shikhar Dhawan (Note: Sam Curran captained PBKS for two matches in which Dhawan was injured.)
Rajasthan Royals	Kumar Sangakkara	Sanju Samson
Royal Challengers Bangalore	Sanjay Bangar	Faf du Plessis (Note: Virat Kohli captained RCB for two matches in which Du Plessis was added as an Impact Player due to injury.)
Sunrisers Hyderabad	Brian Lara	Aiden Markram (Note: Bhuvneshwar Kumar captained SRH for their first match as Markram was unavailable.)

=== Personnel changes ===
In August 2022, Chandrakant Pandit replaced Brendon McCullum as head coach of Kolkata Knight Riders. In September Mumbai Indians promoted Mahela Jayawardene to a strategic role in the franchise and recruited Mark Boucher as head coach for 2023. In November, Tom Moody was replaced by Brian Lara as head coach of Sunrisers Hyderabad. On 16 September 2022 Anil Kumble was also replaced by Trevor Bayliss as head coach of Punjab Kings.

In November 2022, Shikhar Dhawan replaced Mayank Agarwal as the captain of Punjab Kings.

The IPL auction took place on 23 December 2022 in Kochi. The most expensive player was Sam Curran, bought by Punjab Kings for ₹18.50 crore (US$1.9 million), the most paid for a player in the history of the league.

== Venues ==
The league stage was played at 12 stadiums in India.

In the playoffs phase, the first qualifier and eliminator matches were played at Chennai and the second qualifier and the final were played at Ahmedabad.

Cities where teams that participated in the 16th season are based.

Team	Stadium	Location	Capacity
Chennai Super Kings	M. A. Chidambaram Stadium	Chennai	50,000
Delhi Capitals	Arun Jaitley Stadium	Delhi	35,200
Gujarat Titans	Narendra Modi Stadium	Ahmedabad	132,000
Kolkata Knight Riders	Eden Gardens	Kolkata	68,000
Lucknow Super Giants	BRSABV Ekana Cricket Stadium	Lucknow	50,000
Mumbai Indians	Wankhede Stadium	Mumbai	33,000
Punjab Kings	Himachal Pradesh Cricket Association Stadium	Dharamshala	23,000
Punjab Kings	Inderjit Singh Bindra Stadium	Mohali	27,000
Rajasthan Royals	Assam Cricket Association Stadium	Guwahati	46,000
Rajasthan Royals	Sawai Mansingh Stadium	Jaipur	30,000
Royal Challengers Bangalore	M. Chinnaswamy Stadium	Bengaluru	40,000
Sunrisers Hyderabad	Rajiv Gandhi International Cricket Stadium	Hyderabad	55,000

== Standings ==
=== Points table ===
Pos	Grp	Team	Pld	W	L	NR	Pts	NRR	Qualification
1	B	Gujarat Titans (R)	14	10	4	0	20	0.809	Advanced to Qualifier 1
2	B	Chennai Super Kings (C)	14	8	5	1	17	0.652	Advanced to Qualifier 1
3	A	Lucknow Super Giants (4th)	14	8	5	1	17	0.284	Advanced to Eliminator
4	A	Mumbai Indians (3rd)	14	8	6	0	16	−0.044	Advanced to Eliminator
5	A	Rajasthan Royals	14	7	7	0	14	0.148	
6	B	Royal Challengers Bangalore	14	7	7	0	14	0.135	
7	A	Kolkata Knight Riders	14	6	8	0	12	−0.239	
8	B	Punjab Kings	14	6	8	0	12	−0.304	
9	A	Delhi Capitals	14	5	9	0	10	−0.808	
10	B	Sunrisers Hyderabad	14	4	10	0	8	−0.590	

Source: Indian Premier League

The four top-ranked teams will qualify for the Playoffs.
Advance to Qualifier 1
Advance to Eliminator

=== Match summary ===
Team	Group matches														Playoffs			
Team	1	2	3	4	5	6	7	8	9	10	11	12	13	14	Q1	E	Q2	F
Chennai Super Kings	0	2	4	4	6	8	10	10	10	11	13	15	15	17	W			W
Delhi Capitals	0	0	0	0	0	2	4	4	6	8	8	8	10	10				
Gujarat Titans	2	4	4	6	6	8	10	12	12	14	16	16	18	20	L		W	L
Kolkata Knight Riders	0	2	4	4	4	4	4	6	6	8	10	10	12	12				
Lucknow Super Giants	2	2	4	6	6	8	8	10	10	11	11	13	15	17		L		
Mumbai Indians	0	0	2	4	6	6	6	8	10	10	12	14	14	16		W	L	
Punjab Kings	2	4	4	4	6	6	8	8	10	10	10	12	12	12				
Rajasthan Royals	2	2	4	6	8	8	8	10	10	10	10	12	12	14				
Royal Challengers Bengaluru	2	2	2	4	4	6	8	8	10	10	10	12	14	14				
Sunrisers Hyderabad	0	0	2	4	4	4	4	6	6	8	8	8	8	8				

Win	Loss	No result

- Note: The total points at the end of each group match are listed.
- Note: Click on the points (group matches) or W/L (playoffs) to see the match summary.

Visitor team →	CSK	DC	GT	KKR	LSG	MI	PBKS	RR	RCB	SRH
Home team ↓	CSK	DC	GT	KKR	LSG	MI	PBKS	RR	RCB	SRH
Chennai Super Kings		Chennai; 27 runs		Kolkata; 6 wickets	Chennai; 12 runs	Chennai; 6 wickets	Punjab; 4 wickets	Rajasthan; 3 runs		Chennai; 7 wickets
Delhi Capitals	Chennai; 77 runs		Gujarat; 6 wickets	Delhi; 4 wickets		Mumbai; 6 wickets	Punjab; 31 runs		Delhi; 7 wickets	Hyderabad; 9 runs
Gujarat Titans	Gujarat; 5 wickets	Delhi; 5 runs		Kolkata; 3 wickets	Gujarat; 56 runs	Gujarat; 55 runs		Rajasthan; 3 wickets		Gujarat; 34 runs
Kolkata Knight Riders	Chennai; 49 runs		Gujarat; 7 wickets		Lucknow; 1 run		Kolkata; 5 wickets	Rajasthan; 9 wickets	Kolkata; 81 runs	Hyderabad; 23 runs
Lucknow Super Giants	Match abandoned	Lucknow; 50 runs	Gujarat; 7 runs			Lucknow; 5 runs	Punjab; 2 wickets		Bengaluru; 18 runs	Lucknow; 5 wickets
Mumbai Indians	Chennai; 7 wickets		Mumbai; 27 runs	Mumbai; 5 wickets			Punjab; 13 runs	Mumbai; 6 wickets	Mumbai; 6 wickets	Mumbai; 8 wickets
Punjab Kings		Delhi; 15 runs	Gujarat; 6 wickets	Punjab; 7 runs (DLS)	Lucknow; 56 runs	Mumbai; 6 wickets		Rajasthan; 4 wickets	Bengaluru; 24 runs	
Rajasthan Royals	Rajasthan; 32 runs	Rajasthan; 57 runs	Gujarat; 9 wickets		Lucknow; 10 runs		Punjab; 5 runs		Bengaluru; 112 runs	Hyderabad; 4 wickets
Royal Challengers Bengaluru	Chennai; 8 runs	Bengaluru; 23 runs	Gujarat; 6 wickets	Kolkata; 21 runs	Lucknow; 1 wicket	Bengaluru; 8 wickets		Bengaluru; 7 runs		
Sunrisers Hyderabad		Delhi; 7 runs		Kolkata; 5 runs	Lucknow; 7 wickets	Mumbai; 14 runs	Hyderabad; 8 wickets	Rajasthan; 72 runs	Bengaluru; 8 wickets	

Home team won	Visitor team won

- Note: Results listed are according to the home (horizontal) and visitor (vertical) teams.
- Note: Click on a result to see a summary of the match.

== League stage ==
The schedule for the group stages was published on 17 February 2023.

Match 1
31 March 2023
19:30 (N)
Scorecard

Chennai Super Kings; 178/7 (20 overs)	v	Gujarat Titans (H); 182/5 (19.2 overs)
Ruturaj Gaikwad 92 (50); Rashid Khan 2/26 (4 overs)		Shubman Gill 63 (36); Rajvardhan Hangargekar 3/36 (4 overs)

Gujarat Titans won by 5 wickets
Narendra Modi Stadium, Ahmedabad
Umpires: Saiyed Khalid (Ind) and Nitin Menon (Ind)
Player of the match: Rashid Khan (Gujarat Titans)

- Gujarat Titans won the toss and elected to field.
- Tushar Deshpande for Ambati Rayudu (Chennai Super Kings) and Sai Sudharsan for Kane Williamson (Gujarat Titans) were the first Impact Players to be used in the IPL.

Match 2
1 April 2023
15:30 (D/N)
Scorecard

(H) Punjab Kings; 191/5 (20 overs)	v	Kolkata Knight Riders; 146/7 (16 overs)
Bhanuka Rajapaksa 50 (32); Tim Southee 2/54 (4 overs)		Andre Russell 35 (19); Arshdeep Singh 3/19 (3 overs)

Punjab Kings won by 7 runs (DLS method)
Inderjit Singh Bindra Stadium, Mohali
Umpires: Yeshwant Barde (Ind) and Bruce Oxenford (Aus)
Player of the match: Arshdeep Singh (Punjab Kings)

- Kolkata Knight Riders won the toss and elected to field.
- The start of the second innings was delayed for more than 30 minutes due to malfunctioning floodlights.
- Kolkata Knight Riders innings curtailed at 16 overs due to rain; DLS par score was 153.

Match 3
1 April 2023
19:30 (N)
Scorecard

(H) Lucknow Super Giants; 193/6 (20 overs)	v	Delhi Capitals; 143/9 (20 overs)
Kyle Mayers 73 (38); Khaleel Ahmed 2/30 (4 overs)		David Warner 56 (48); Mark Wood 5/14 (4 overs)

Lucknow Super Giants won by 50 runs
BRSABV Ekana Cricket Stadium, Lucknow
Umpires: Anil Chaudhary (Ind) and Nikhil Patwardhan (Ind)
Player of the match: Mark Wood (Lucknow Super Giants)

- Delhi Capitals won the toss and elected to field.

Match 4
2 April 2023
15:30 (D/N)
Scorecard

Rajasthan Royals; 203/5 (20 overs)	v	Sunrisers Hyderabad (H); 131/8 (20 overs)
Sanju Samson 55 (32); T. Natarajan 2/23 (3 overs)		Abdul Samad 32* (32); Yuzvendra Chahal 4/17 (4 overs)

Rajasthan Royals won by 72 runs
Rajiv Gandhi International Cricket Stadium, Hyderabad
Umpires: K. N. Ananthapadmanabhan (Ind) and Rohan Pandit (Ind)
Player of the match: Jos Buttler (Rajasthan Royals)

- Sunrisers Hyderabad won the toss and elected to field.

Match 5
2 April 2023
19:30 (N)
Scorecard

Mumbai Indians; 171/7 (20 overs)	v	Royal Challengers Bangalore (H); 172/2 (16.2 overs)
Tilak Varma 84* (46); Karn Sharma 2/32 (4 overs)		Virat Kohli 82* (49); Arshad Khan 1/28 (2.2 overs)

Royal Challengers Bangalore won by 8 wickets
M. Chinnaswamy Stadium, Bengaluru
Umpires: Nitin Menon (Ind) and Tapan Sharma (Ind)
Player of the match: Faf du Plessis (Royal Challengers Bangalore)

- Royal Challengers Bangalore won the toss and elected to field.
- Arshad Khan and Nehal Wadhera (Mumbai Indians) both made their T20 debuts.

Match 6
3 April 2023
19:30 (N)
Scorecard

(H) Chennai Super Kings; 217/7 (20 overs)	v	Lucknow Super Giants; 205/7 (20 overs)
Ruturaj Gaikwad 57 (31); Ravi Bishnoi 3/28 (4 overs)		Kyle Mayers 53 (22); Moeen Ali 4/26 (4 overs)

Chennai Super Kings won by 12 runs
M. A. Chidambaram Stadium, Chennai
Umpires: Bruce Oxenford (Aus) and Akshay Totre (Ind)
Player of the match: Moeen Ali (Chennai Super Kings)

- Lucknow Super Giants won the toss and elected to field.

Match 7
4 April 2023
19:30 (N)
Scorecard

(H) Delhi Capitals; 162/8 (20 overs)	v	Gujarat Titans; 163/4 (18.1 overs)
David Warner 37 (32); Rashid Khan 3/31 (4 overs)		Sai Sudharsan 62* (48); Anrich Nortje 2/39 (4 overs)

Gujarat Titans won by 6 wickets
Arun Jaitley Stadium, Delhi
Umpires: Sadashiv Iyer (Ind) and Nand Kishore (Ind)
Player of the match: Sai Sudharsan (Gujarat Titans)

- Gujarat Titans won the toss and elected to field.

Match 8
5 April 2023
19:30 (N)
Scorecard

Punjab Kings; 197/4 (20 overs)	v	Rajasthan Royals (H); 192/7 (20 overs)
Shikhar Dhawan 86* (56); Jason Holder 2/29 (4 overs)		Sanju Samson 42 (25); Nathan Ellis 4/30 (4 overs)

Punjab Kings won by 5 runs
Assam Cricket Association Stadium, Guwahati
Umpires: K. N. Ananthapadmanabhan (Ind) and Saidharshan Kumar (Ind)
Player of the match: Nathan Ellis (Punjab Kings)

- Rajasthan Royals won the toss and elected to field.

Match 9
6 April 2023
19:30 (N)
Scorecard

Kolkata Knight Riders (H); 204/7 (20 overs)	v	Royal Challengers Bangalore; 123 (17.4 overs)
Shardul Thakur 68 (29); David Willey 2/16 (4 overs)		Faf du Plessis 23 (12); Varun Chakaravarthy 4/15 (3.4 overs)

Kolkata Knight Riders won by 81 runs
Eden Gardens, Kolkata
Umpires: Virender Sharma (Ind) and Vinod Seshan (Ind)
Player of the match: Shardul Thakur (Kolkata Knight Riders)

- Royal Challengers Bangalore won the toss and elected to field.
- Suyash Sharma (Kolkata Knight Riders) made his T20 debut.

Match 10
7 April 2023
19:30 (N)
Scorecard

Sunrisers Hyderabad; 121/8 (20 overs)	v	Lucknow Super Giants (H); 127/5 (16 overs)
Rahul Tripathi 34 (41); Krunal Pandya 3/18 (4 overs)		KL Rahul 35 (31); Adil Rashid 2/23 (3 overs)

Lucknow Super Giants won by 5 wickets
BRSABV Ekana Cricket Stadium, Lucknow
Umpires: Yeshwant Barde (Ind) and Jayaraman Madanagopal (Ind)
Player of the match: Krunal Pandya (Lucknow Super Giants)

- Sunrisers Hyderabad won the toss and elected to bat.

Match 11
8 April 2023
15:30 (D/N)
Scorecard

(H) Rajasthan Royals; 199/4 (20 overs)	v	Delhi Capitals; 142/9 (20 overs)
Jos Buttler 79 (51); Mukesh Kumar 2/36 (4 overs)		David Warner 65 (55); Yuzvendra Chahal 3/27 (4 overs)

Rajasthan Royals won by 57 runs
Assam Cricket Association Stadium, Guwahati
Umpires: Saidharshan Kumar (Ind) and Navdeep Singh (Ind)
Player of the match: Yashasvi Jaiswal (Rajasthan Royals)

- Delhi Capitals won the toss and elected to field.

Match 12
8 April 2023
19:30 (N)
Scorecard

(H) Mumbai Indians; 157/8 (20 overs)	v	Chennai Super Kings; 159/3 (18.1 overs)
Ishan Kishan 32 (21); Ravindra Jadeja 3/20 (4 overs)		Ajinkya Rahane 61 (27); Kumar Kartikeya 1/24 (4 overs)

Chennai Super Kings won by 7 wickets
Wankhede Stadium, Mumbai
Umpires: Chris Gaffaney (NZ) and Nikhil Patwardhan (Ind)
Player of the match: Ravindra Jadeja (Chennai Super Kings)

- Chennai Super Kings won the toss and elected to field.

Match 13
9 April 2023
15:30 (D/N)
Scorecard

(H) Gujarat Titans; 204/4 (20 overs)	v	Kolkata Knight Riders; 207/7 (20 overs)
Vijay Shankar 63* (24); Sunil Narine 3/33 (4 overs)		Venkatesh Iyer 83 (40); Rashid Khan 3/37 (4 overs)

Kolkata Knight Riders won by 3 wickets
Narendra Modi Stadium, Ahmedabad
Umpires: Nitin Menon (Ind) and Tapan Sharma (Ind)
Player of the match: Rinku Singh (Kolkata Knight Riders)

- Gujarat Titans won the toss and elected to bat.
- Rashid Khan (Gujarat Titans) took a hat-trick.

Match 14
9 April 2023
19:30 (N)
Scorecard

Punjab Kings; 143/9 (20 overs)	v	Sunrisers Hyderabad (H); 145/2 (17.1 overs)
Shikhar Dhawan 99* (66); Mayank Markande 4/15 (4 overs)		Rahul Tripathi 74* (48); Arshdeep Singh 1/20 (3 overs)

Sunrisers Hyderabad won by 8 wickets
Rajiv Gandhi International Cricket Stadium, Hyderabad
Umpires: Ulhas Gandhe (Ind) and Bruce Oxenford (Aus)
Player of the match: Shikhar Dhawan (Punjab Kings)

- Sunrisers Hyderabad won the toss and elected to field.
- Mohit Rathee (Punjab Kings) made his T20 debut.

Match 15
10 April 2023
19:30 (N)
Scorecard

(H) Royal Challengers Bangalore; 212/2 (20 overs)	v	Lucknow Super Giants; 213/9 (20 overs)
Faf du Plessis 79* (46); Amit Mishra 1/18 (2 overs)		Marcus Stoinis 65 (30); Mohammed Siraj 3/22 (4 overs)

Lucknow Super Giants won by 1 wicket
M. Chinnaswamy Stadium, Bengaluru
Umpires: Anil Chaudhary (Ind) and Nand Kishore (Ind)
Player of the match: Nicholas Pooran (Lucknow Super Giants)

- Lucknow Super Giants won the toss and elected to field.

Match 16
11 April 2023
19:30 (N)
Scorecard

(H) Delhi Capitals; 172 (19.4 overs)	v	Mumbai Indians; 173/4 (20 overs)
Axar Patel 54 (25); Piyush Chawla 3/22 (4 overs)		Rohit Sharma 65 (45); Mukesh Kumar 2/30 (2 overs)

Mumbai Indians won by 6 wickets
Arun Jaitley Stadium, Delhi
Umpires: Michael Gough (Eng) and Rohan Pandit (Ind)
Player of the match: Rohit Sharma (Mumbai Indians)

- Mumbai Indians won the toss and elected to field.

Match 17
12 April 2023
19:30 (N)
Scorecard

Rajasthan Royals; 175/8 (20 overs)	v	Chennai Super Kings (H); 172/6 (20 overs)
Jos Buttler 52 (36); Ravindra Jadeja 2/21 (4 overs)		Devon Conway 50 (38); Ravichandran Ashwin 2/25 (4 overs)

Rajasthan Royals won by 3 runs
M. A. Chidambaram Stadium, Chennai
Umpires: Virender Sharma (Ind) and Vinod Seshan (Ind)
Player of the match: Ravichandran Ashwin (Rajasthan Royals)

- Chennai Super Kings won the toss and elected to field.

Match 18
13 April 2023
19:30 (N)
Scorecard

(H) Punjab Kings; 153/8 (20 overs)	v	Gujarat Titans; 154/4 (19.5 overs)
Matthew Short 36 (24); Mohit Sharma 2/18 (4 overs)		Shubman Gill 67 (49); Harpreet Brar 1/20 (4 overs)

Gujarat Titans won by 6 wickets
Inderjit Singh Bindra Stadium, Mohali
Umpires: Jayaraman Madanagopal (Ind) and Akshay Totre (Ind)
Player of the match: Shubman Gill (Gujarat Titans)

- Gujarat Titans won the toss and elected to field.
- Kagiso Rabada (Punjab Kings) became the fastest bowler, in terms of matches, to take 100 wickets in the Indian Premier League.

Match 19
14 April 2023
19:30 (N)
Scorecard

Sunrisers Hyderabad; 228/4 (20 overs)	v	Kolkata Knight Riders (H); 205/7 (20 overs)
Harry Brook 100* (55); Andre Russell 3/22 (2.1 overs)		Nitish Rana 75 (41); Mayank Markande 2/27 (4 overs)

Sunrisers Hyderabad won by 23 runs
Eden Gardens, Kolkata
Umpires: Chris Gaffaney (NZ) and Sadashiv Iyer (Ind)
Player of the match: Harry Brook (Sunrisers Hyderabad)

- Kolkata Knight Riders won the toss and elected to field.
- Harry Brook (Sunrisers Hyderabad) scored his maiden IPL century.

Match 20
15 April 2023
15:30 (D/N)
Scorecard

(H) Royal Challengers Bangalore; 174/6 (20 overs)	v	Delhi Capitals; 151/9 (20 overs)
Virat Kohli 50 (34); Mitchell Marsh 2/18 (2 overs)		Manish Pandey 50 (38); Vijaykumar Vyshak 3/20 (4 overs)

Royal Challengers Bangalore won by 23 runs
M. Chinnaswamy Stadium, Bengaluru
Umpires: K. N. Ananthapadmanabhan (Ind) and Saidharshan Kumar (Ind)
Player of the match: Virat Kohli (Royal Challengers Bangalore)

- Delhi Capitals won the toss and elected to field.

Match 21
15 April 2023
19:30 (N)
Scorecard

(H) Lucknow Super Giants; 159/8 (20 overs)	v	Punjab Kings; 161/8 (19.3 overs)
KL Rahul 74 (56); Sam Curran 3/31 (4 overs)		Sikandar Raza 57 (41); Ravi Bishnoi 2/18 (2.3 overs)

Punjab Kings won by 2 wickets
BRSABV Ekana Cricket Stadium, Lucknow
Umpires: Saiyed Khalid (Ind) and Virender Sharma (Ind)
Player of the match: Sikandar Raza (Punjab Kings)

- Punjab Kings won the toss and elected to field.

Match 22
16 April 2023
15:30 (D/N)
Scorecard

Kolkata Knight Riders; 185/6 (20 overs)	v	Mumbai Indians (H); 186/5 (17.4 overs)
Venkatesh Iyer 104 (51); Hrithik Shokeen 2/34 (4 overs)		Ishan Kishan 58 (25); Suyash Sharma 2/27 (4 overs)

Mumbai Indians won by 5 wickets
Wankhede Stadium, Mumbai
Umpires: Ulhas Gandhe (Ind) and Bruce Oxenford (Aus)
Player of the match: Venkatesh Iyer (Kolkata Knight Riders)

- Mumbai Indians won the toss and elected to field.
- Venkatesh Iyer (Kolkata Knight Riders) scored his maiden IPL century.

Match 23
16 April 2023
19:30 (N)
Scorecard

(H) Gujarat Titans; 177/7 (20 overs)	v	Rajasthan Royals; 179/7 (19.2 overs)
David Miller 46 (30); Sandeep Sharma 2/25 (4 overs)		Sanju Samson 60 (32); Mohammad Shami 3/25 (4 overs)

Rajasthan Royals won by 3 wickets
Narendra Modi Stadium, Ahmedabad
Umpires: Anil Chaudhary (Ind) and Chris Gaffaney (NZ)
Player of the match: Shimron Hetmyer (Rajasthan Royals)

- Rajasthan Royals won the toss and elected to field.

Match 24
17 April 2023
19:30 (N)
Scorecard

Chennai Super Kings; 226/6 (20 overs)	v	Royal Challengers Bangalore (H); 218/8 (20 overs)
Devon Conway 83 (45); Wanindu Hasaranga 1/21 (2 overs)		Glenn Maxwell 76 (36); Tushar Deshpande 3/45 (4 overs)

Chennai Super Kings won by 8 runs
M. Chinnaswamy Stadium, Bengaluru
Umpires: K. N. Ananthapadmanabhan (Ind) and Navdeep Singh (Ind)
Player of the match: Devon Conway (Chennai Super Kings)

- Royal Challengers Bangalore won the toss and elected to field.

Match 25
18 April 2023
19:30 (N)
Scorecard

Mumbai Indians; 192/5 (20 overs)	v	Sunrisers Hyderabad (H); 178 (19.5 overs)
Cameron Green 64* (40); Marco Jansen 2/43 (4 overs)		Mayank Agarwal 48 (41); Riley Meredith 2/33 (4 overs)

Mumbai Indians won by 14 runs
Rajiv Gandhi International Stadium, Hyderabad
Umpires: Nitin Menon (Ind) and Vinod Seshan (Ind)
Player of the match: Cameron Green (Mumbai Indians)

- Sunrisers Hyderabad won the toss and elected to field.

Match 26
19 April 2023
19:30 (N)
Scorecard

Lucknow Super Giants; 154/7 (20 overs)	v	Rajasthan Royals (H); 144/6 (20 overs)
Kyle Mayers 51 (42); Ravichandran Ashwin 2/23 (4 overs)		Yashasvi Jaiswal 44 (35); Avesh Khan 3/25 (4 overs)

Lucknow Super Giants won by 10 runs
Sawai Mansingh Stadium, Jaipur
Umpires: Yeshwant Barde (Ind) and Jayaraman Madanagopal (Ind)
Player of the match: Marcus Stoinis (Lucknow Super Giants)

- Rajasthan Royals won the toss and elected to field.

Match 27
20 April 2023
15:30 (D/N)
Scorecard

Royal Challengers Bangalore; 174/4 (20 overs)	v	Punjab Kings (H); 150 (18.2 overs)
Faf du Plessis 84 (56); Harpreet Brar 2/31 (3 overs)		Prabhsimran Singh 46 (30); Mohammed Siraj 4/21 (4 overs)

Royal Challengers Bangalore won by 24 runs
Inderjit Singh Bindra Stadium, Mohali
Umpires: Anil Chaudhary (Ind) and Sadashiv Iyer (Ind)
Player of the match: Faf du Plessis (Royal Challengers Bangalore)

- Punjab Kings won the toss and elected to field.

Match 28
20 April 2023
19:30 (N)
Scorecard

Kolkata Knight Riders; 127 (20 overs)	v	Delhi Capitals (H); 128/6 (19.2 overs)
Jason Roy 43 (39); Axar Patel 2/13 (3 overs)		David Warner 57 (41); Varun Chakravarthy 2/16 (4 overs)

Delhi Capitals won by 4 wickets
Arun Jaitley Stadium, Delhi
Umpires: Michael Gough (Eng) and Rohan Pandit (Ind)
Player of the match: Ishant Sharma (Delhi Capitals)

- Delhi Capitals won the toss and elected to field.

Match 29
21 April 2023
19:30 (N)
Scorecard

Sunrisers Hyderabad; 134/7 (20 overs)	v	Chennai Super Kings (H); 138/3 (18.4 overs)
Abhishek Sharma 34 (26); Ravindra Jadeja 3/22 (4 overs)		Devon Conway 77* (57); Mayank Markande 2/23 (4 overs)

Chennai Super Kings won by 7 wickets
M. A. Chidambaram Stadium, Chennai
Umpires: Saiyed Khalid (Ind) and Virender Sharma (Ind)
Player of the match: Ravindra Jadeja (Chennai Super Kings)

- Chennai Super Kings won the toss and elected to field.

Match 30
22 April 2023
15:30 (N)
Scorecard

Gujarat Titans; 135/6 (20 overs)	v	Lucknow Super Giants (H); 128/7 (20 overs)
Hardik Pandya 66 (50); Krunal Pandya 2/16 (4 overs)		KL Rahul 68 (61); Mohit Sharma 2/17 (3 overs)

Gujarat Titans won by 7 runs
BRSABV Ekana Cricket Stadium, Lucknow
Umpires: Akshay Totre (Ind) and Rod Tucker (Aus)
Player of the match: Mohit Sharma (Gujarat Titans)

- Gujarat Titans won the toss and elected to bat.

Match 31
22 April 2023
19:30 (N)
Scorecard

Punjab Kings; 214/8 (20 overs)	v	Mumbai Indians (H); 201/6 (20 overs)
Sam Curran 55 (29); Piyush Chawla 2/15 (3 overs)		Cameron Green 67 (43); Arshdeep Singh 4/29 (4 overs)

Punjab Kings won by 13 runs
Wankhede Stadium, Mumbai
Umpires: Chris Gaffaney (NZ) and Sadashiv Iyer (Ind)
Player of the match: Sam Curran (Punjab Kings)

- Mumbai Indians won the toss and elected to field.

Match 32
23 April 2023
15:30 (D/N)
Scorecard

(H) Royal Challengers Bangalore; 189/9 (20 overs)	v	Rajasthan Royals; 182/6 (20 overs)
Glenn Maxwell 77 (44); Trent Boult 2/41 (4 overs)		Devdutt Padikkal 52 (34); Harshal Patel 3/32 (4 overs)

Royal Challengers Bangalore won by 7 runs
M. Chinnaswamy Stadium, Bangalore
Umpires: Michael Gough (Eng) and Saidharshan Kumar (Ind)
Player of the match: Glenn Maxwell (Royal Challengers Bangalore)

- Rajasthan Royals won the toss and elected to field.

Match 33
23 April 2023
19:30 (N)
Scorecard

Chennai Super Kings; 235/4 (20 overs)	v	Kolkata Knight Riders (H); 186/8 (20 overs)
Ajinkya Rahane 71* (29); Kulwant Khejroliya 2/44 (3 overs)		Jason Roy 61 (26); Maheesh Theekshana 2/32 (4 overs)

Chennai Super Kings won by 49 runs
Eden Gardens, Kolkata
Umpires: Nitin Menon (Ind) and Tapan Sharma (Ind)
Player of the match: Ajinkya Rahane (Chennai Super Kings)

- Kolkata Knight Riders won the toss and elected to field.

Match 34
24 April 2023
19:30 (N)
Scorecard

Delhi Capitals; 144/9 (20 overs)	v	Sunrisers Hyderabad (H); 137/6 (20 overs)
Manish Pandey 34 (27); Washington Sundar 3/28 (4 overs)		Mayank Agarwal 49 (39); Axar Patel 2/21 (4 overs)

Delhi Capitals won by 7 runs
Rajiv Gandhi International Cricket Stadium, Hyderabad
Umpires: Jayaraman Madanagopal (Ind) and Rod Tucker (Aus)
Player of the match: Axar Patel (Delhi Capitals)

- Delhi Capitals won the toss and elected to bat.

Match 35
25 April 2023
19:30 (N)
Scorecard

(H) Gujarat Titans; 207/6 (20 overs)	v	Mumbai Indians; 152/9 (20 overs)
Shubman Gill 56 (34); Piyush Chawla 2/34 (4 overs)		Nehal Wadhera 40 (21); Noor Ahmad 3/37 (4 overs)

Gujarat Titans won by 55 runs
Narendra Modi Stadium, Ahmedabad
Umpires: Anil Chaudhary (Ind) and Nand Kishore (Ind)
Player of the match: Abhinav Manohar (Gujarat Titans)

- Mumbai Indians won the toss and elected to field.

Match 36
26 April 2023
19:30 (N)
Scorecard

Kolkata Knight Riders; 200/5 (20 overs)	v	Royal Challengers Bangalore (H); 179/8 (20 overs)
Jason Roy 56 (29); Wanindu Hasaranga 2/24 (4 overs)		Virat Kohli 54 (37); Varun Chakravarthy 3/27 (4 overs)

Kolkata Knight Riders won by 21 runs
M. Chinnaswamy Stadium, Bengaluru
Umpires: K. N. Ananthapadmanabhan (Ind) and Rohan Pandit (Ind)
Player of the match: Varun Chakravarthy (Kolkata Knight Riders)

- Royal Challengers Bangalore won the toss and elected to field.

Match 37
27 April 2023
19:30 (N)
Scorecard

(H) Rajasthan Royals; 202/5 (20 overs)	v	Chennai Super Kings; 170/6 (20 overs)
Yashasvi Jaiswal 77 (43); Tushar Deshpande 2/42 (4 overs)		Shivam Dube 52 (33); Adam Zampa 3/22 (3 overs)

Rajasthan Royals won by 32 runs
Sawai Mansingh Stadium, Jaipur
Umpires: Yeshwant Barde (Ind) and Akshay Totre (Ind)
Player of the match: Yashasvi Jaiswal (Rajasthan Royals)

- Rajasthan Royals won the toss and elected to bat.

Match 38
28 April 2023
19:30 (N)
Scorecard

Lucknow Super Giants; 257/5 (20 overs)	v	Punjab Kings (H); 201 (19.5 overs)
Marcus Stoinis 72 (40); Kagiso Rabada 2/52 (4 overs)		Atharva Taide 66 (36); Yash Thakur 4/37 (3.5 overs)

Lucknow Super Giants won by 56 runs
Inderjit Singh Bindra Stadium, Mohali
Umpires: Nitin Menon (Ind) and Vinod Seshan (Ind)
Player of the match: Marcus Stoinis (Lucknow Super Giants)

- Punjab Kings won the toss and elected to field.
- Gurnoor Brar (Punjab Kings) made his T20 debut.

Match 39
29 April 2023
15:30 (D/N)
Scorecard

(H) Kolkata Knight Riders; 179/7 (20 overs)	v	Gujarat Titans; 180/3 (17.5 overs)
Rahmanullah Gurbaz 81 (39); Mohammed Shami 3/33 (4 overs)		Vijay Shankar 51* (24); Sunil Narine 1/24 (3 overs)

Gujarat Titans won by 7 wickets
Eden Gardens, Kolkata
Umpires: Sadashiv Iyer (Ind) and Nikhil Patwardhan (Ind)
Player of the match: Josh Little (Gujarat Titans)

- Gujarat Titans won the toss and elected to field.

Match 40
29 April 2023
19:30 (N)
Scorecard

Sunrisers Hyderabad; 197/6 (20 overs)	v	Delhi Capitals (H); 188/6 (20 overs)
Abhishek Sharma 67 (36); Mitchell Marsh 4/27 (4 overs)		Mitchell Marsh 63 (39); Mayank Markande 2/20 (4 overs)

Sunrisers Hyderabad won by 9 runs
Arun Jaitley Stadium, Delhi
Umpires: Michael Gough (Eng) and Navdeep Singh (Ind)
Player of the match: Mitchell Marsh (Delhi Capitals)

- Sunrisers Hyderabad won the toss and elected to bat.

Match 41
30 April 2023
15:30 (D/N)
Scorecard

(H) Chennai Super Kings; 200/4 (20 overs)	v	Punjab Kings; 201/6 (20 overs)
Devon Conway 92* (52); Sikandar Raza 1/31 (3 overs)		Prabhsimran Singh 42 (24); Tushar Deshpande 3/49 (4 overs)

Punjab Kings won by 4 wickets
M. A. Chidambaram Stadium, Chennai
Umpires: Ulhas Gandhe (Ind) and Rod Tucker (Aus)
Player of the match: Devon Conway (Chennai Super Kings)

- Chennai Super Kings won the toss and elected to bat.

Match 42
30 April 2023
19:30 (N)
Scorecard

Rajasthan Royals; 212/7 (20 overs)	v	Mumbai Indians (H); 214/4 (19.3 overs)
Yashasvi Jaiswal 124 (62); Arshad Khan 3/39 (3 overs)		Suryakumar Yadav 55 (29); Ravichandran Ashwin 2/27 (4 overs)

Mumbai Indians won by 6 wickets
Wankhede Stadium, Mumbai
Umpires: Virender Sharma (Ind) and Vinod Seshan (Ind)
Player of the match: Yashasvi Jaiswal (Rajasthan Royals)

- Rajasthan Royals won the toss and elected to bat.
- Yashasvi Jaiswal (Rajasthan Royals) scored his maiden IPL century.

Match 43
1 May 2023
19:30 (N)
Scorecard

Royal Challengers Bangalore; 126/9 (20 overs)	v	Lucknow Super Giants (H); 108 (19.5 overs)
Faf du Plessis 44 (40); Naveen-ul-Haq 3/30 (4 overs)		Krishnappa Gowtham 23 (13); Josh Hazlewood 2/15 (3 overs)

Royal Challengers Bangalore won by 18 runs
BRSABV Ekana Cricket Stadium, Lucknow
Umpires: Anil Chaudhary (Ind) and Sadashiv Iyer (Ind)
Player of the match: Faf du Plessis (Royal Challengers Bangalore)

- Royal Challengers Bangalore won the toss and elected to bat.

Match 44
2 May 2023
19:30 (N)
Scorecard

Delhi Capitals; 130/8 (20 overs)	v	Gujarat Titans (H); 125/6 (20 overs)
Aman Hakim Khan 51 (44); Mohammed Shami 4/11 (4 overs)		Hardik Pandya 59* (53); Ishant Sharma 2/23 (4 overs)

Delhi Capitals won by 5 runs
Narendra Modi Stadium, Ahmedabad
Umpires: Michael Gough (Ind) and Rohan Pandit (Ind)
Player of the match: Mohammed Shami (Gujarat Titans)

- Delhi Capitals won the toss and elected to bat.

Match 45
3 May 2023
15:30 (D/N)
Scorecard

(H) Lucknow Super Giants; 125/7 (19.2 overs)	v	Chennai Super Kings
Ayush Badoni 59* (33); Moeen Ali 2/13 (4 overs)

No result
BRSABV Ekana Cricket Stadium, Lucknow
Umpires: Anil Chaudhary (Ind) and Nikhil Patwardhan (Ind)

- Chennai Super Kings won the toss and elected to field.
- No further play was possible due to rain.
- The match was shifted from 4 May to 3 May due to the Lucknow Municipal Corporation elections.

Match 46
3 May 2023
19:30 (N)
Scorecard

(H) Punjab Kings; 214/3 (20 overs)	v	Mumbai Indians; 216/4 (18.5 overs)
Liam Livingstone 82* (42); Piyush Chawla 2/29 (4 overs)		Ishan Kishan 75 (41); Nathan Ellis 2/34 (4 overs)

Mumbai Indians won by 6 wickets
Inderjit Singh Bindra Stadium, Mohali
Umpires: Jayaraman Madanagopal (Ind) and Rod Tucker (Aus)
Player of the match: Ishan Kishan (Mumbai Indians)

- Mumbai Indians won the toss and elected to field.

Match 47
4 May 2023
19:30 (N)
Scorecard

Kolkata Knight Riders; 171/9 (20 overs)	v	Sunrisers Hyderabad (H); 166/8 (20 overs)
Rinku Singh 46 (35); Marco Jansen 2/24 (3 overs)		Aiden Markram 41 (40); Shardul Thakur 2/23 (3 overs)

Kolkata Knight Riders won by 5 runs
Rajiv Gandhi International Cricket Stadium, Hyderabad
Umpires: K. N. Ananthapadmanabhan (Ind) and Michael Gough (Eng)
Player of the match: Varun Chakravarthy (Kolkata Knight Riders)

- Kolkata Knight Riders won the toss and elected to bat.

Match 48
5 May 2023
19:30 (N)
Scorecard

(H) Rajasthan Royals; 118 (17.5 overs)	v	Gujarat Titans; 119/1 (13.5 overs)
Sanju Samson 30 (20); Rashid Khan 3/14 (4 overs)		Wriddhiman Saha 41* (34); Yuzvendra Chahal 1/22 (3.5 overs)

Gujarat Titans won by 9 wickets
Sawai Mansingh Stadium, Jaipur
Umpires: Saiyed Khalid (Ind) and Virender Sharma (Ind)
Player of the match: Rashid Khan (Gujarat Titans)

- Rajasthan Royals won the toss and elected to bat.

Match 49
6 May 2023
15:30 (D/N)
Scorecard

Mumbai Indians; 139/8 (20 overs)	v	Chennai Super Kings (H); 140/4 (17.4 overs)
Nehal Wadhera 64 (51); Matheesha Pathirana 3/15 (4 overs)		Devon Conway 44 (42); Piyush Chawla 2/25 (4 overs)

Chennai Super Kings won by 6 wickets
M. A. Chidambaram Stadium, Chennai
Umpires: Bruce Oxenford (Aus) and Navdeep Singh (Ind)
Player of the match: Matheesha Pathirana (Chennai Super Kings)

- Chennai Super Kings won the toss and elected to field.
- Raghav Goyal (Mumbai Indians) made his T20 debut.

Match 50
6 May 2023
19:30 (N)
Scorecard

Royal Challengers Bangalore; 181/4 (20 overs)	v	Delhi Capitals (H); 187/3 (16.4 overs)
Virat Kohli 55 (46); Mitchell Marsh 2/21 (3 overs)		Phil Salt 87 (45); Josh Hazlewood 1/29 (3 overs)

Delhi Capitals won by 7 wickets
Arun Jaitley Stadium, Delhi
Umpires: Yeshwant Barde (Ind) and Rod Tucker (Aus)
Player of the match: Phil Salt (Delhi Capitals)

- Royal Challengers Bangalore won the toss and elected to bat.

Match 51
7 May 2023
15:30 (D/N)
Scorecard

(H) Gujarat Titans; 227/2 (20 overs)	v	Lucknow Super Giants; 171/7 (20 overs)
Shubman Gill 94* (51); Avesh Khan 1/34 (4 overs)		Quinton de Kock 70 (41); Mohit Sharma 4/29 (4 overs)

Gujarat Titans won by 56 runs
Narendra Modi Stadium, Ahmedabad
Umpires: Anil Chaudhary (Ind) and Nand Kishore (Ind)
Player of the match: Shubman Gill (Gujarat Titans)

- Lucknow Super Giants won the toss and elected to field.

Match 52
7 May 2023
19:30 (D/N)
Scorecard

(H) Rajasthan Royals; 214/2 (20 overs)	v	Sunrisers Hyderabad; 217/6 (20 overs)
Jos Buttler 95 (59); Marco Jansen 1/44 (4 overs); Bhuvneshwar Kumar 1/44 (4 overs)		Abhishek Sharma 55 (34); Yuzvendra Chahal 4/29 (4 overs)

Sunrisers Hyderabad won by 4 wickets
Sawai Mansingh Stadium, Jaipur
Umpires: Nitin Menon (Ind) and Vinod Seshan (Ind)
Player of the match: Glenn Phillips (Sunrisers Hyderabad)

- Rajasthan Royals won the toss and elected to bat.

Match 53
8 May 2023
19:30 (N)
Scorecard

Punjab Kings; 179/7 (20 overs)	v	Kolkata Knight Riders (H); 182/5 (20 overs)
Shikhar Dhawan 57 (47); Varun Chakravarthy 3/26 (4 overs)		Nitish Rana 51 (38); Rahul Chahar 2/23 (4 overs)

Kolkata Knight Riders won by 5 wickets
Eden Gardens, Kolkata
Umpires: Jayaraman Madanagopal (Ind) and Akshay Totre (Ind)
Player of the match: Andre Russell (Kolkata Knight Riders)

- Punjab Kings won the toss and elected to bat.

Match 54
9 May 2023
19:30 (N)
Scorecard

Royal Challengers Bangalore; 199/6 (20 overs)	v	Mumbai Indians (H); 200/4 (16.3 overs)
Glenn Maxwell 68 (33); Jason Behrendorff 3/36 (4 overs)		Suryakumar Yadav 83 (35); Vijaykumar Vyshak 2/37 (3 overs)

Mumbai Indians won by 6 wickets
Wankhede Stadium, Mumbai
Umpires: Saiyed Khalid (Ind) and Virender Sharma (Ind)
Player of the match: Suryakumar Yadav (Mumbai Indians)

- Mumbai Indians won the toss and elected to field.

Match 55
10 May 2023
19:30 (N)
Scorecard

(H) Chennai Super Kings; 167/8 (20 overs)	v	Delhi Capitals; 140/8 (20 overs)
Shivam Dube 25 (12); Mitchell Marsh 3/18 (3 overs)		Rilee Rossouw 35 (37); Matheesha Pathirana 3/37 (4 overs)

Chennai Super Kings won by 27 runs
M. A. Chidambaram Stadium, Chennai
Umpires: Chris Gaffaney (NZ) and Nikhil Patwardhan (Ind)
Player of the match: Ravindra Jadeja (Chennai Super Kings)

- Chennai Super Kings won the toss and elected to bat.

Match 56
11 May 2023
19:30 (N)
Scorecard

(H) Kolkata Knight Riders; 149/8 (20 overs)	v	Rajasthan Royals; 151/1 (13.1 overs)
Venkatesh Iyer 57 (42); Yuzvendra Chahal 4/25 (4 overs)		Yashasvi Jaiswal 98* (47)

Rajasthan Royals won by 9 wickets
Eden Gardens, Kolkata
Umpires: Saidharshan Kumar (Ind) and Rod Tucker (Aus)
Player of the match: Yashasvi Jaiswal (Rajasthan Royals)

- Rajasthan Royals won the toss and elected to field.
- Yashasvi Jaiswal (Rajasthan Royals) scored the fastest fifty in IPL history (13 balls).

Match 57
12 May 2023
19:30 (N)
Scorecard

(H) Mumbai Indians; 218/5 (20 overs)	v	Gujarat Titans; 191/8 (20 overs)
Suryakumar Yadav 103* (49); Rashid Khan 4/30 (4 overs)		Rashid Khan 79* (32); Akash Madhwal 3/31 (4 overs)

Mumbai Indians won by 27 runs
Wankhede Stadium, Mumbai
Umpires: Nitin Menon (Ind) and Tapan Sharma (Ind)
Player of the match: Suryakumar Yadav (Mumbai Indians)

- Gujarat Titans won the toss and elected to field.
- Suryakumar Yadav (Mumbai Indians) scored his maiden IPL century.

Match 58
13 May 2023
15:30 (D/N)
Scorecard

(H) Sunrisers Hyderabad; 182/6 (20 overs)	v	Lucknow Super Giants; 185/3 (19.2 overs)
Heinrich Klaasen 47 (29); Krunal Pandya 2/24 (4 overs)		Prerak Mankad 64* (45); Glenn Phillips 1/10 (2 overs)

Lucknow Super Giants won by 7 wickets
Rajiv Gandhi International Stadium, Hyderabad
Umpires: Jayaraman Madanagopal (Ind) and Akshay Totre (Ind)
Player of the match: Prerak Mankad (Lucknow Super Giants)

- Sunrisers Hyderabad won the toss and elected to bat.

Match 59
13 May 2023
19:30 (N)
Scorecard

Punjab Kings; 167/7 (20 overs)	v	Delhi Capitals (H); 136/8 (20 overs)
Prabhsimran Singh 103 (65); Ishant Sharma 2/27 (3 overs)		David Warner 54 (27); Harpreet Brar 4/30 (4 overs)

Punjab Kings won by 31 runs
Arun Jaitley Stadium, Delhi
Umpires: Chris Gaffaney (NZ) and Nikhil Patwardhan (Ind)
Player of the match: Prabhsimran Singh (Punjab Kings)

- Delhi Capitals won the toss and elected to field.
- Delhi Capitals were eliminated as a result of this match.
- Prabhsimran Singh (Punjab Kings) scored his first IPL century.

Match 60
14 May 2023
15:30 (D/N)
Scorecard

Royal Challengers Bangalore; 171/5 (20 overs)	v	Rajasthan Royals (H); 59 (10.3 overs)
Faf du Plessis 55 (44); Adam Zampa 2/25 (4 overs)		Shimron Hetmyer 35 (19); Wayne Parnell 3/10 (3 overs)

Royal Challengers Bangalore won by 112 runs
Sawai Mansingh Stadium, Jaipur
Umpires: K. N. Ananthapadmanabhan (Ind) and Navdeep Singh (Ind)
Player of the match: Wayne Parnell (Royal Challengers Bangalore)

- Royal Challengers Bangalore won the toss and elected to bat.

Match 61
14 May 2023
19:30 (N)
Scorecard

(H) Chennai Super Kings; 144/6 (20 overs)	v	Kolkata Knight Riders; 147/4 (18.3 overs)
Shivam Dubey 48* (34); Sunil Narine 2/15 (4 overs)		Nitish Rana 57* (44); Deepak Chahar 3/27 (3 overs)

Kolkata Knight Riders won by 6 wickets
M. A. Chidambaram Stadium, Chennai
Umpires: Tapan Sharma (Ind) and Vinod Seshan (Ind)
Player of the match: Rinku Singh (Kolkata Knight Riders)

- Chennai Super Kings won the toss and elected to bat.

Match 62
15 May 2023
19:30 (N)
Scorecard

(H) Gujarat Titans; 188/9 (20 overs)	v	Sunrisers Hyderabad; 154/9 (20 overs)
Shubman Gill 101 (58); Bhuvneshwar Kumar 5/30 (4 overs)		Heinrich Klaasen 64 (44); Mohammed Shami 4/21 (4 overs)

Gujarat Titans won by 34 runs
Narendra Modi Stadium, Ahmedabad
Umpires: Ulhas Gandhe (Ind) and Jayaraman Madanagopal (Ind)
Player of the match: Shubman Gill (Gujarat Titans)

- Sunrisers Hyderabad won the toss and elected to field.
- Gujarat Titans qualified for the playoffs and Sunrisers Hyderabad were eliminated as a result of this match
- Shubman Gill scored his maiden IPL century.

Match 63
16 May 2023
19:30 (N)
Scorecard

(H) Lucknow Super Giants; 177/3 (20 overs)	v	Mumbai Indians; 172/5 (20 overs)
Marcus Stoinis 89* (47); Jason Behrendorff 2/30 (4 overs)		Ishan Kishan 59 (39); Ravi Bishnoi 2/26 (4 overs)

Lucknow Super Giants won by 5 runs
BRSABV Ekana Cricket Stadium, Lucknow
Umpires: Anil Chaudhary (Ind) and Nand Kishore (Ind)
Player of the match: Marcus Stoinis (Lucknow Super Giants)

- Mumbai Indians won the toss and elected to field.

Match 64
17 May 2023
19:30 (N)
Scorecard

Delhi Capitals; 213/2 (20 overs)	v	Punjab Kings (H); 198/8 (20 overs)
Rilee Rossouw 82* (37); Sam Curran 2/36 (4 overs)		Liam Livingstone 94 (48); Anrich Nortje 2/36 (4 overs)

Delhi Capitals won by 15 runs
HPCA Stadium, Dharamshala
Umpires: K. N. Ananthapadmanabhan (Ind) and Saidharshan Kumar (Ind)
Player of the match: Rilee Rossouw (Delhi Capitals)

- Punjab Kings won the toss and elected to field.

Match 65
18 May 2023
19:30 (N)
Scorecard

(H) Sunrisers Hyderabad; 186/5 (20 overs)	v	Royal Challengers Bangalore; 187/2 (19.2 overs)
Heinrich Klaasen 104 (51); Michael Bracewell 2/13 (2 overs)		Virat Kohli 100 (63); T. Natarajan 1/34 (4 overs)

Royal Challengers Bangalore won by 8 wickets
Rajiv Gandhi International Stadium, Hyderabad
Umpires: Bruce Oxenford (Aus) and Virender Sharma (Ind)
Player of the match: Virat Kohli (Royal Challengers Bangalore)

- Royal Challengers Bangalore won the toss and elected to field.
- Heinrich Klaasen (Sunrisers Hyderabad) scored his maiden IPL century.

Match 66
19 May 2023
19:30 (N)
Scorecard

(H) Punjab Kings; 187/5 (20 overs)	v	Rajasthan Royals; 189/6 (19.4 overs)
Sam Curran 49* (31); Navdeep Saini 3/40 (4 overs)		Devdutt Padikkal 51 (30); Kagiso Rabada 2/40 (4 overs)

Rajasthan Royals won by 4 wickets
HPCA Stadium, Dharamshala
Umpires: Nand Kishore (Ind) and Rod Tucker (Aus)
Player of the match: Devdutt Padikkal (Rajasthan Royals)

- Rajasthan Royals won the toss and elected to field.
- Punjab Kings were eliminated as a result of this match.

Match 67
20 May 2023
15:30 (D/N)
Scorecard

Chennai Super Kings; 223/3 (20 overs)	v	Delhi Capitals (H); 146/9 (20 overs)
Devon Conway 87 (52); Chetan Sakariya 1/36 (4 overs)		David Warner 86 (58); Deepak Chahar 3/22 (4 overs)

Chennai Super Kings won by 77 runs
Arun Jaitley Stadium, Delhi
Umpires: Chris Gaffaney (NZ) and Nikhil Patwardhan (Ind)
Player of the match: Devon Conway (Chennai Super Kings)

- Chennai Super Kings won the toss and elected to bat.
- Chennai Super Kings qualified for the playoffs as a result of this match.

Match 68
20 May 2023
19:30 (N)
Scorecard

Lucknow Super Giants; 176/8 (20 overs)	v	Kolkata Knight Riders (H); 175/7 (20 overs)
Nicholas Pooran 58 (30); Shardul Thakur 2/27 (2 overs)		Rinku Singh 67* (33); Ravi Bishnoi 2/23 (4 overs)

Lucknow Super Giants won by 1 run
Eden Gardens, Kolkata
Umpires: Ulhas Gandhe (Ind) and Jayaraman Madanagopal (Ind)
Player of the match: Nicholas Pooran (Lucknow Super Giants)

- Kolkata Knight Riders won the toss and elected to field.
- Lucknow Super Giants qualified for the playoffs and Kolkata Knight Riders were eliminated as a result of this match.

Match 69
21 May 2023
15:30 (D/N)
Scorecard

Sunrisers Hyderabad; 200/5 (20 overs)	v	Mumbai Indians (H); 201/2 (18 overs)
Mayank Agarwal 83 (46); Akash Madhwal 4/37 (4 overs)		Cameron Green 100* (47); Bhuvneshwar Kumar 1/26 (4 overs)

Mumbai Indians won by 8 wickets
Wankhede Stadium, Mumbai
Umpires: K. N. Ananthapadmanabhan (Ind) and Rod Tucker (Aus)
Player of the match: Cameron Green (Mumbai Indians)

- Mumbai Indians won the toss and elected to field.
- Cameron Green (Mumbai Indians) scored his maiden IPL century.
- Rajasthan Royals were eliminated as a result of this match.

Match 70
21 May 2023
19:30 (N)
Scorecard

(H) Royal Challengers Bangalore; 197/5 (20 overs)	v	Gujarat Titans; 198/4 (19.1 overs)
Virat Kohli 101* (61); Noor Ahmad 2/39 (4 overs)		Shubman Gill 104* (52); Mohammed Siraj 2/32 (4 overs)

Gujarat Titans won by 6 wickets
M. Chinnaswamy Stadium, Bengaluru
Umpires: Nitin Menon (Ind) and Virender Sharma (Ind)
Player of the match: Shubman Gill (Gujarat Titans)

- Gujarat Titans won the toss and elected to field.
- Himanshu Sharma (Royal Challengers Bangalore) made his T20 debut.
- Mumbai Indians qualified for the playoffs and Royal Challengers Bangalore were eliminated as a result of this match.

== Playoffs ==
The full schedule for the playoffs was announced on 21 April 2023.

Qualifier 1 / Eliminator
23 May 2023 - Chennai
1	Gujarat Titans	157 (20 overs)
2	Chennai Super Kings	172/7 (20 overs)
24 May 2023 - Chennai
3	Lucknow Super Giants	101 (16.3 overs)
4	Mumbai Indians	182/8 (20 overs)

Qualifier 2
26 May 2023 - Ahmedabad
Q1L	Gujarat Titans	233/3 (20 overs)
EW	Mumbai Indians	171 (18.2 overs)

Final
29 May 2023 - Ahmedabad
Q1W	Chennai Super Kings	171/5 (15 overs)
Q2W	Gujarat Titans	214/4 (20 overs)

=== Qualifier 1 ===
23 May 2023
19:30 (N)
Scorecard

Chennai Super Kings; 172/7 (20 overs)	v	Gujarat Titans; 157 (20 overs)
Ruturaj Gaikwad 60 (44); Mohammed Shami 2/28 (4 overs)		Shubman Gill 42 (38); Ravindra Jadeja 2/18 (4 overs)

Chennai Super Kings won by 15 runs
MA Chidambaram Stadium, Chennai
Umpires: Anil Chaudhary (Ind) and Chris Gaffaney (NZ)
Player of the match: Ruturaj Gaikwad (Chennai Super Kings)

- Gujarat Titans won the toss and elected to field.
- Chennai Super Kings qualified for the final for the 10th time in IPL history.

=== Eliminator ===
24 May 2023
19:30 (N)
Scorecard

Mumbai Indians; 182/8 (20 overs)	v	Lucknow Super Giants; 101 (16.3 overs)
Cameron Green 41 (23); Naveen-ul-Haq 4/38 (4 overs)		Marcus Stoinis 40 (27); Akash Madhwal 5/5 (3.3 overs)

Mumbai Indians won by 81 runs
MA Chidambaram Stadium, Chennai
Umpires: Bruce Oxenford (Aus) and Virender Sharma (Ind)
Player of the match: Akash Madhwal (Mumbai Indians)

- Mumbai Indians won the toss and elected to bat.

=== Qualifier 2 ===
26 May 2023
19:30 (N)
Scorecard

Gujarat Titans; 233/3 (20 overs)	v	Mumbai Indians; 171 (18.2 overs)
Shubman Gill 129 (60); Piyush Chawla 1/45 (3 overs)		Suryakumar Yadav 61 (38); Mohit Sharma 5/10 (2.2 overs)

Gujarat Titans won by 62 runs
Narendra Modi Stadium, Ahmedabad
Umpires: Nitin Menon (Ind) and Rod Tucker (Aus)
Player of the match: Shubman Gill (Gujarat Titans)

- Mumbai Indians won the toss and elected to field.
- Shubman Gill (Gujarat Titans) made the highest individual score of 129 runs from 60 balls in IPL Playoffs.
- Gujarat Titans's total was the highest score in IPL Playoffs.

=== Final ===
29 May 2023
19:30 (N)
Scorecard

Gujarat Titans; 214/4 (20 overs)	v	Chennai Super Kings; 171/5 (15 overs)
Sai Sudharsan 96 (47); Matheesha Pathirana 2/44 (4 overs)		Devon Conway 47 (25); Mohit Sharma 3/36 (3 overs)

Chennai Super Kings won by 5 wickets (DLS method)
Narendra Modi Stadium , Ahmedabad
Umpires: Nitin Menon (Ind) and Rod Tucker (Aus)
Player of the match: Devon Conway (Chennai Super Kings)

- Chennai Super Kings won the toss and elected to field.
- The match was originally scheduled to be held on 28 May 2023, but it was not held due to rain and was instead played on the reserve day on 29 May 2023 and ended on 30 May 2023 at 01:35 IST, thus, becoming the longest ever IPL final. (Note: It was the first IPL in history which had a reserved day and the game was held on it.)
- Chennai Super Kings were set a revised target of 171 runs from 15 overs due to rain.
- By winning in the final, Chennai Super Kings equalled Mumbai Indians for winning the most IPL trophies (5).

== Broadcasting ==
In June 2022, the broadcasting rights for the league between 2023 and 2027 were sold for ₹48,390 crore (US$5.0 billion), establishing the league as the second most expensive tournament in the world after the National Football League, overtaking the English Premier League. Star Sports renewed its television contract, and Viacom18 acquired the digital rights within India; matches were streamed for free on JioCinema. The final peaked at over 32 million viewers on JioCinema, overtaking a match from the 2019 Cricket World Cup as the most concurrent viewers on a live streaming event worldwide.

Country	Television channel	Internet streaming applications	Ref
Afghanistan	Ariana Television Network	-	
Australia	Fox Sports	Kayo Sports, Foxtel (Note: Kayo Sports and Fox tell offers video on demand service.) and Fox Now	
Bangladesh	T Sports, Gazi TV	T Sports App	
Caribbean	Rush TV, Flow Sports 2	Enet	
India	Star Sports	JioCinema	
Nepal	Star Sports		
New Zealand	Sky Sport		
Pakistan	-	tapmad TV, YuppTV	
South Africa & Sub-Saharian Africa	Super Sport	-	
Sri Lanka	Supreme TV, Dialog TV, Peo TV	Dialog TV, Peo TV	
United Kingdom	DAZN, Sky Sports Cricket, Sky Sports Main Event	-	
United States & Canada	Willow TV	willow.tv	

== Issues ==
=== Slow over- rate ===
In this IPL season, matches took longer time to finish due to teams bowling at a slow over-rate. According to the IPL rules, an innings should be completed in 90 minutes, including two 5-minute strategic timeouts, and a complete match should be finished in stipulated 3 hours and 20 minutes. However, as of 5 April 2023, not a single innings had ended in the above-mentioned time frame. Despite penalizing team captains, the over rates have seen little improvement.

English cricketer Jos Buttler appealed on Twitter that the IPL matches should be sped up. Due to the slow over-rates of the various teams, this season's matches finished after 11:30 pm (IST). IPL evening matches are scheduled to start at 7:30 pm and, therefore, should be concluded by 10:50 pm.

=== Impact player rule ===
The 2023 season saw the introduction of the impact player rule which allowed for each team to provide a list of 5 players along with the list of their playing 11. Of these 5 designated players, any impact player could then be bought on to feature in the match.

Many cricket pundits criticised the new impact player rule because of the thought that this rule negates the role and involvement of all-rounders in the game.

== Statistics and awards ==
=== Most runs ===
Player	Team	Innings	Runs	High score
Shubman Gill	Gujarat Titans	17	890	129
Faf du Plessis	Royal Challengers Bangalore	14	730	84
Devon Conway	Chennai Super Kings	15	672	92*
Virat Kohli	Royal Challengers Bangalore	14	639	101*
Yashasvi Jaiswal	Rajasthan Royals	14	625	124

- Orange Cap
- Source: IPLT20.com

=== Most wickets ===
Player	Team	Matches	Wickets	Best bowling
Mohammed Shami	Gujarat Titans	17	28	4/11
Mohit Sharma	Gujarat Titans	14	27	5/10
Rashid Khan	Gujarat Titans	17	27	4/30
Piyush Chawla	Mumbai Indians	16	22	3/22
Yuzvendra Chahal	Rajasthan Royals	14	22	4/17

- Purple Cap
- Source: IPLT20.com

=== End of season awards ===
Player	Team	Award	Prize
	Delhi Capitals	Team fairplay award	
Mohammed Shami	Gujarat Titans	Purple cap (most wickets)	₹10 lakh (US$10,000)
Rashid Khan	Gujarat Titans	Catch of the season	₹10 lakh (US$10,000) and trophy
Shubman Gill	Gujarat Titans	Gamechanger of the season	₹10 lakh (US$10,000) and trophy
Shubman Gill	Gujarat Titans	Most fours	₹10 lakh (US$10,000) and trophy
Shubman Gill	Gujarat Titans	Player of the season	₹10 lakh (US$10,000) and trophy
Shubman Gill	Gujarat Titans	Orange cap (most runs)	₹10 lakh (US$10,000)
Yashasvi Jaiswal	Rajasthan Royals	Emerging player of the season	₹10 lakh (US$10,000)
Virat Kohli	Royal Challengers Bangalore	Most sixes	₹10 lakh (US$10,000) and trophy
Faf du Plessis	Royal Challengers Bangalore	Longest six	₹10 lakh (US$10,000) and trophy
Glenn Maxwell	Royal Challengers Bangalore	Super striker	₹10 lakh (US$10,000), trophy and a car

- Source: Sportstar
