= 2027 Indian Premier League =

Twenty20 cricket tournament

- Dates: 10 March – 15 May 2027
- Administrator: Board of Control for Cricket in India
- Cricket format: Twenty20
- Tournament format(s): Group stage and playoffs
- Participants: 10
- Matches: 74
- Official website: iplt20.com

The 2027 Indian Premier League, also known as IPL 20 and branded as TATA IPL 2027, will be the 20th edition of the Indian Premier League, a professional Twenty20 cricket league. The tournament will feature 10 teams competing in 74 matches from 10 March to 15 May.

Royal Challengers Bengaluru are the defending champions.

== Background ==
The Indian Premier League (IPL) is a professional Twenty20 (T20) cricket league, organised by the Board of Control for Cricket in India (BCCI). It has been held annually since the first edition in 2008. Royal Challengers Bengaluru are the defending champions, having won their second consecutive title in the previous season after defeating Gujarat Titans in the final.

=== Format ===
The IPL Governing Council had announced that the IPL would expand to 84 matches for 2026 and 2027, with it expected to expand to 94 matches from 2028 onwards with the return of the complete double round-robin format that was used until 2021. However, the number of matches was kept as 74 for two more editions as it was in the previous four seasons.

=== Schedule ===
According to Cricinfo, the dates of the tournament window for the three seasons between 2025 and 2027 were sent to franchises ahead of the 2025 auction. In November 2024, the tentative dates for the three seasons were announced, with the 2028 edition set to take place from 14 March to 30 May. In the meantime, the International Cricket Council (ICC) had consolidated the February–March window for its annual men's competitions, which led to the 2025 and 2026 IPL seasons being postponed from their originally announced dates to maintain a few weeks gap after 2025 ICC Champions Trophy and 2026 Men's T20 World Cup respectively.

In June 2026, it was announced that the BCCI was considering moving IPL to a September–October window from 2027 onwards to avoid the later part of the season clashing with the pre monsoon rain season. However the following week, the ICC announced that the 2027 Cricket World Cup and the 2028 Men's T20 World Cup would be held in an October–November window. The following week, the BCCI announced that the IPL would move to a early March–early May window with the 2027 season taking place from 10 March to 15 May.

=== Marketing ===
The Tata Group renewed their contract as the title sponsors of the IPL for a tenure of 5 years (2024–2028) for ₹2,500 crore (US$270 million).

=== Broadcasting ===
JioStar's Star Sports and JioHotstar, held the television and digital rights respectively, for the remainder of the 2023–2027 cycle.

== Teams ==
The same 10 teams from the previous season returned.

Group	Team	2026 performance	Head coach	Captain
TBA	Chennai Super Kings	8th	Zaheer Khan	Ruturaj Gaikwad
TBA	Kolkata Knight Riders	7th	Abhishek Nayar	TBA
TBA	Punjab Kings	5th	Ricky Ponting	Shreyas Iyer
TBA	Rajasthan Royals	3rd	Kumar Sangakkara	Riyan Parag
TBA	Royal Challengers Bengaluru	Champions	Andy Flower	Rajat Patidar
TBA	Delhi Capitals	6th	Sourav Ganguly	Axar Patel
TBA	Gujarat Titans	Runners-up	Ashish Nehra	Shubman Gill
TBA	Lucknow Super Giants	10th	Justin Langer	TBA
TBA	Mumbai Indians	9th	Kieron Pollard	TBA
TBA	Sunrisers Hyderabad	4th	Daniel Vettori	Pat Cummins

=== Personnel changes ===
The franchises were required to submit their retention lists before 17 November 2026, and a total of 184 players were retained ahead of the auction. The auction will be held on 16 December 2026 in Goa, India, with the auction purse for each franchise set at ₹157 crore (US$17 million).

== Venues ==
Ahmedabad	Bengaluru	Chennai	Delhi	Dharamshala
Gujarat Titans	Royal Challengers Bengaluru	Chennai Super Kings	Delhi Capitals	Punjab Kings
Narendra Modi Stadium	M. Chinnaswamy Stadium	M. A. Chidambaram Stadium	Arun Jaitley Stadium	HPCA Cricket Stadium
Capacity: 132,000	Capacity: 40,000	Capacity: 39,000	Capacity: 35,200	Capacity: 21,200
Narendra Modi Stadium in 2023	M. Chinnaswamy Stadium in 2017	M. A. Chidambaram Stadium in 2023	Arun Jaitley Stadium in 2023	HPCA Cricket Stadium in 2015
Guwahati	A map of India with pin-points on 2027 Indian Premier League venues			Hyderabad
Rajasthan Royals	A map of India with pin-points on 2027 Indian Premier League venues			Sunrisers Hyderabad
ACA Cricket Stadium	A map of India with pin-points on 2027 Indian Premier League venues			Rajiv Gandhi Stadium
Capacity: 46,000	A map of India with pin-points on 2027 Indian Premier League venues			Capacity: 55,000
ACA Cricket Stadium in 2018	A map of India with pin-points on 2027 Indian Premier League venues			Rajiv Gandhi Stadium in 2024
Jaipur	A map of India with pin-points on 2027 Indian Premier League venues			Kolkata
Rajasthan Royals	A map of India with pin-points on 2027 Indian Premier League venues			Kolkata Knight Riders
Sawai Mansingh Stadium	A map of India with pin-points on 2027 Indian Premier League venues			Eden Gardens
Capacity: 30,000	A map of India with pin-points on 2027 Indian Premier League venues			Capacity: 68,000
Sawai Mansingh Stadium in 2013	A map of India with pin-points on 2027 Indian Premier League venues			Eden Gardens in 2023
Lucknow	Mullanpur	Mumbai	Raipur	
Lucknow Super Giants	Punjab Kings	Mumbai Indians	Royal Challengers Bengaluru	
Ekana Cricket Stadium	Maharaja Yadavindra Singh Stadium	Wankhede Stadium	Shaheed Veer Narayan Singh Stadium	
Capacity: 50,000	Capacity: 38,000	Capacity: 33,108	Capacity: 65,000	
Ekana Cricket Stadium in 2018	Maharaja Yadavindra Singh Stadium in 2026	Wankhede Stadium in 2011	Shaheed Veer Narayan Singh Stadium in 2021	

== League stage ==
=== Points table ===
League stage standings
Pos	Grp	Team	Pld	W	L	NR	Pts	NRR	Qualification
1		Chennai Super Kings	0	0	0	0	0	—	Advance to the qualifier 1
2		Delhi Capitals	0	0	0	0	0	—	Advance to the qualifier 1
3		Gujarat Titans	0	0	0	0	0	—	Advance to the eliminator
4		Kolkata Knight Riders	0	0	0	0	0	—	Advance to the eliminator
5		Lucknow Super Giants	0	0	0	0	0	—	
6		Mumbai Indians	0	0	0	0	0	—	
7		Punjab Kings	0	0	0	0	0	—	
8		Rajasthan Royals	0	0	0	0	0	—	
9		Royal Challengers Bengaluru	0	0	0	0	0	—	
10		Sunrisers Hyderabad	0	0	0	0	0	—	

First match(es) will be played: unknown. Source: Cricinfo
Rules for classification: 1) Points; 2) Wins; 3) Net run rate; 4) Wickets taken per fair deliveries; 5) drawing lots

=== Match summary ===
Team	Group matches	Playoffs		
Team	Q1	E	Q2	F

Win	Loss	No result

- Note: The total points at the end of each group match are listed.
- Note: Click on the points (group matches) or W/L (playoffs) to see the match summary.

Visitor team →
Home team ↓

- Note: Results listed are according to the home (horizontal) and visitor (vertical) teams.
- Note: Click on a result to see a summary of the match.

== Playoffs ==
=== Bracket ===
Qualifier 1
1	1st placed team
2	2nd placed team
Eliminator
3	3rd placed team
4	4th placed team

Qualifier 2
Q1L	Loser of qualifier 1
EW	Winner of eliminator 1

Final
Q1W	Winner of qualifier 1
Q2W	Winner of qualifier 2

- Source: Cricinfo

=== Qualifier 1 ===
Qualifier 1

1st placed team	v	2nd placed team

=== Eliminator ===
Eliminator

3rd placed team	v	4th placed team

=== Qualifier 2 ===
Qualifier 2

Loser of qualifier 1	v	Winner of eliminator

=== Final ===
Final

Winner of qualifier 1	v	Winner of qualifier 2
