= Raghav Goyal =

Indian cricketer (born 2001)

Personal information
- Full name: Raghav Goyal
- Born: 26 January 2001 (age 25)
- Batting: Left-handed
- Bowling: Left-arm unorthodox spin
- Role: Bowler

Domestic team information
- Years: Team
- 2023: Mumbai Indians
- Source: ESPNcricinfo, 3 January 2024

Raghav Goyal (born 26 January 2001) is an Indian cricketer, who bats left-handed and bowls left-arm unorthodox spin. He started learning to play cricket at the age of 11. He hails from Panipat, a city in Haryana, although he received training from Vijay Yadav Cricket Academy in Faridabad. He is known for his economical spin bowling and his ability to play big shots.

He took five wickets at an economy rate of 6.90 in the 2023 DY Patil T20 Cup. Consequently, he was bought by the Mumbai Indians at a price of ₹20 lakh, to play for them in the Indian Premier League. With this, he also became the first player from Panipat to get an IPL call-up. He made his Twenty20 debut for the Mumbai Indians on 6 May 2023, against the Chennai Super Kings in the 2023 Indian Premier League. He was called in by MI skipper, Rohit Sharma to bowl in defence of MI's 139 score. Prior to being bought by MI, he had never played any professional cricket match at senior level.

Before joining the Mumbai Indians, he was a cricket player at Reliance 1 and Sukhna Zone in India.
