= Harpreet Brar =

Indian cricketer

Personal information
- Born: 16 September 1995 (age 31); Meerut, Uttar Pradesh, India
- Height: 6 ft 2 in (188 cm)
- Batting: Left-handed
- Bowling: Slow left-arm orthodox
- Role: Bowler

Domestic team information
- Years: Team
- 2019–present: Punjab Kings
- 2019/20–present: Punjab

Career statistics
Competition	FC	List A	Twenty20
Matches	2	18	105
Runs scored	7	109	427
Batting average	3.50	13.62	17.08
100s/50s	0/0	0/0	0/0
Top score	3*	29	29
Balls bowled	414	813	1,951
Wickets	8	19	102
Bowling average	20.87	32.26	23.79
5 wickets in innings	0	0	0
10 wickets in match	0	–	–
Best bowling	3/29	4/43	4/18
Catches/stumpings	0/–	10/–	29/–
- Source: ESPNcricinfo, 3 January 2026

Harpreet Singh Brar (born 16 September 1995) is an Indian cricketer. He currently plays for the Punjab Kings in the Indian Premier League (IPL) and Punjab in Domestic Cricket.

== Early life ==
Brar was born into a Jatt Sikh family in Meerut, Uttar Pradesh, where his father served as a soldier and police officer. After briefly residing in Hariewala village in Moga, Punjab, he moved to Zirakpur, Punjab at the age of five. In 2011, Brar began playing for the Ropar district team, and later went on to represent Punjab at the under-16 level. He holds Yuvraj Singh in high regard and considers him as his role model.

== Career ==
On 18 December 2018, Brar got an IPL contract, in the 2019 IPL Auction. He was bought by the Kings XI Punjab ahead of the 2019 Indian Premier League. He was signed up for ₹20 lakh (equivalent to ₹27 lakh or US$29,000 in 2026).

After playing in IPL 2019, Brar was named in the India Under-23 squad for a five-match one-day series against Bangladesh Under-23, held at the Ekana Cricket Stadium in Lucknow in September 2019. He made his debut in the second match of the series.

On 30 April 2021, against Royal Challengers Bangalore, Brar took his maiden IPL wicket, of Virat Kohli, and finished the match with figures of 3 for 19 in his four overs. He also took the wicket of Glenn Maxwell, which he took back to back alongside Virat Kohli's, and the wicket of AB de Villiers.

In February 2022, he was bought by the Punjab Kings in the auction for the 2022 Indian Premier League tournament.

In May 2023, Brar took four wickets against IPL team Delhi Capitals to help his team win the game. He also played many small cameos at the end of the batting in 2024.

== Music ==
Harpreet Brar is also an established singer who has been interested in music since his childhood. His songs include Pagg, which has over 2 million views on YouTube. Others include, Mehfill, Jatt Jammeya, Viah Di Treek.
