= Piyush Chawla =

Indian cricketer (born 1988)

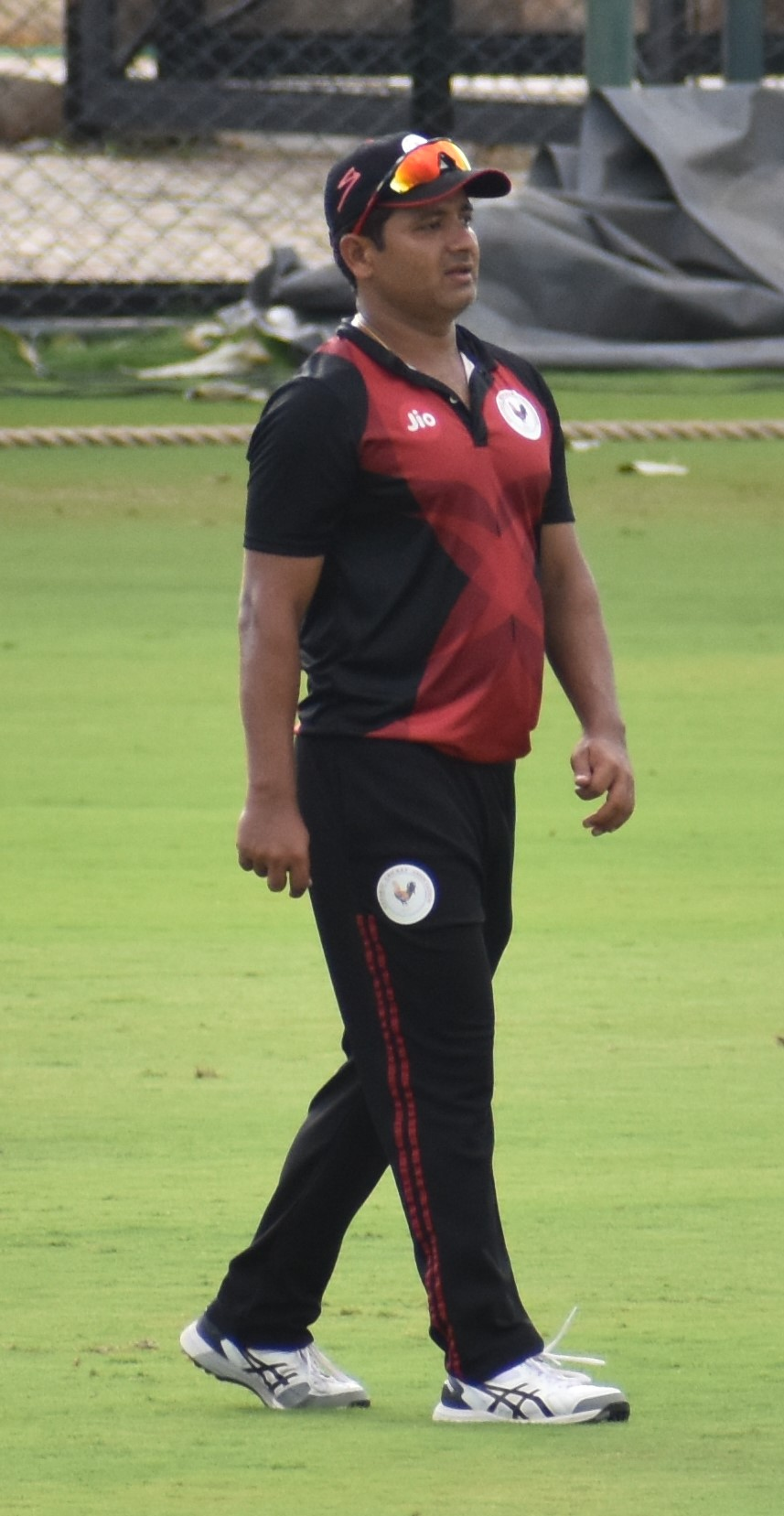
- Chawla at the 2019–20 Vijay Hazare Trophy

Personal information
- Born: 24 December 1988 (age 37); Aligarh, Uttar Pradesh, India
- Height: 1.73 m (5 ft 8 in)
- Batting: Left-handed
- Bowling: Right-arm leg break
- Role: All-rounder

International information
- National side: India (2006–2012)
- Test debut (cap 254): 9 March 2006 v England
- Last Test: 13 December 2012 v England
- ODI debut (cap 167): 12 May 2007 v Bangladesh
- Last ODI: 9 March 2011 v Netherlands
- ODI shirt no.: 11
- T20I debut (cap 28): 2 May 2010 v South Africa
- Last T20I: 22 December 2012 v England

Domestic team information
- Years: Team
- 2005–2007: Gujarat
- 2008–2013: Kings XI Punjab
- 2008–2024: Uttar Pradesh
- 2009: Sussex
- 2013: Somerset
- 2014–2019: Kolkata Knight Riders
- 2020: Chennai Super Kings
- 2021, 2023–2024: Mumbai Indians
- 2025–present: Abu Dhabi Knight Riders
- 2026–present: Jaffna Kings

Career statistics
Competition	Test	ODI	T20I	FC
Matches	3	25	7	137
Runs scored	6	38	0	5,486
Batting average	2.00	5.42	0.00	30.99
100s/50s	0/0	0/0	0/0	6/36
Top score	4	13*	0	156
Balls bowled	492	1,312	138	26,686
Wickets	7	32	4	446
Bowling average	38.57	34.90	37.75	32.82
5 wickets in innings	0	0	0	23
10 wickets in match	0	0	0	3
Best bowling	4/69	4/23	2/13	6/46
Catches/stumpings	1/–	9/–	2/–	59/–
Medal record
Men's cricket
Representing India
ICC Cricket World Cup
Winner	2011 India-Bangladesh-Sri Lanka
ICC T20 World Cup
Winner	2007 South Africa
ACC Asia Cup
Runner-up	2008 Pakistan
ACC U19 Asia Cup
Winner	2003 Pakistan
- Source: ESPNcricinfo, 27 March 2025

Piyush Chawla (Born 24 December 1988) is an Indian cricketer. He is an all-rounder, who bats left handed and bowls right-arm leg break. Chawla has played for the India national team, and was a member of the Indian squad that won the 2007 T20 World Cup and the 2011 Cricket World Cup.

== Early life ==
Chawla spent his childhood in Moradabad and learnt early essentials of cricket at Sonakpur Stadium under the guidance of his first coach Mr KK Gautam. He completed his schooling from Wilsonia College, Moradabad.

== Career ==
Chawla first played for India U-19 against the England U-19 team in 2004–05, claiming 13 wickets from two Under-19 Tests at a bowling average of just above 12. He also played in the 2005–06 home series against Australia U-19, where they won the five-match limited overs series 4–1, taking eight wickets.

In the 2005–06 Challenger Trophy, Chawla was selected to play for India B. Although he only bowled three of a possible ten overs in the first match of the series, conceding 21, he picked up two wickets in the next match against India A, and as India B reached the final against the Seniors, he took the wicket of Sachin Tendulkar – bowled with a googly – in an effort described by Cricinfo as "impressive". He also dismissed Yuvraj Singh and Mahendra Singh Dhoni, to end with three for 49, but the Seniors still won by three wickets. Two weeks later, he made his first class debut for Central Zone against South Zone in the Duleep Trophy and scored 60 in a 92-run eighth-wicket stand with Harvinder Singh. He also finished with match bowling figures of 27.2–3–100–6, admittedly only getting one of the top five batsman once. He has been known by Kiran More since the age of 15 and at only 17 has potentially got a great cricketing future in front of him. He proved himself again when he took 4 wickets in 8 overs conceding only 8 runs in the U-19 World Cup final of 2006. He also made 25 (n.o.) runs.

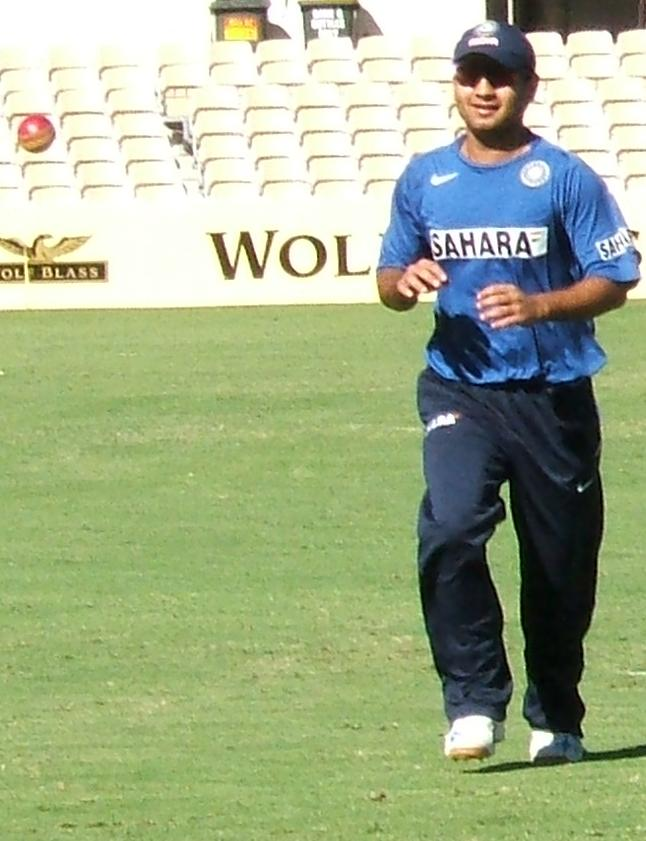
Chawla at fielding practice

This resulted in his selection in the Indian Test squad for the first Test against England in Nagpur, in March 2006, and was selected for his debut in the second Test against England in Mohali, making him the second youngest Test debutant for India after Sachin Tendulkar. It was in this Test that he claimed his sole wicket of Andrew Flintoff (0/45 from 9 overs, and 1/8 from 5.1 overs).

He played his first ODI with India on 12 May 2007, against Bangladesh. His debut was highly successful, with him taking 3 wickets. In the second ODI with Ireland, he was equally impressive with three wickets.

He returned to Test after two years in April 2008 against South Africa, where he took 2/66 (wickets of opener Neil McKenzie and AB de Villiers), but bowled only four wicketless overs in the second innings.

In 2009, Chawla signed for Sussex County Cricket Club for a month, as cover for Yasir Arafat who was with Pakistan. In his first County Championship match against Worcestershire, he took a total of 8 wickets in the match, and came in at number 9 in the first innings, and scored 102* from only 86 balls.

Chawla was selected for 2010 ICC World Twenty20 in West Indies. He was also a member of the ICC Cricket World Cup-winning Indian squad in 2011.

He returned to play his third Test, after 4 years, against England at Nagpur in December 2012, where the hosts had fielded four spinners Ravichandran Ashwin, Pragyan Ojha, debutant Ravindra Jadeja and Chawla. Chawla took 4/69 in the 1st innings. Chawla returned to English county cricket in August 2013 when he joined Somerset as their overseas player for the last five weeks of the season.

He was the leading wicket-taker for Gujarat in the 2017–18 Ranji Trophy, with 32 dismissals in six matches. He was also the leading wicket-taker for Gujarat in the 2018–19 Vijay Hazare Trophy, with sixteen dismissals in eight matches. Chawla took 446 wickets in 137 first-class matches playing domestic cricket for Gujarat and Uttar Pradesh.

On 6 June 2025, Chawla announced his retirement from all forms of cricket.

== IPL career ==
Chawla played in the IPL for the Kings XI Punjab team from 2008 to 2013. He has had a successful time at Punjab. After IPL 4 he had taken 57 wickets in 55 matches and only 5 players had better record at the time. He was sold for US$900,000 to KXIP in 4th Edition of IPL.

On 12 February 2014, Chawla was bought by Kolkata Knight Riders for ₹4.25 lakh in IPL 7 auction. In January 2018, he was bought by the Kolkata Knight Riders in the 2018 IPL auction. In the 2020 IPL auction, he was bought by the Chennai Super Kings ahead of the 2020 Indian Premier League. In February 2021, Chawla was bought by the Mumbai Indians in the IPL auction ahead of the 2021 Indian Premier League. During the 2022 Indian Premier League, Chawla remained unsold. However, he was again bought by Mumbai Indians in the IPL auction ahead of the 2023 Indian Premier League for the base price of ₹50 lakh.
