= Akash Madhwal =

Indian cricketer and civil engineer (born 1993)

Personal information
- Born: 25 November 1993 (age 32); Roorkee, Uttarakhand, India
- Batting: Right-handed
- Bowling: Right-arm medium-fast
- Role: Bowler

Domestic team information
- Years: Team
- 2019–present: Uttarakhand
- 2023–2024: Mumbai Indians (squad no. 25)
- 2025: Rajasthan Royals
- 2026: Chennai Super Kings

Career statistics
Competition	FC	LA	T20
Matches	14	22	46
Runs scored	82	56	10
Batting average	5.46	11.20	5.00
100s/50s	0/0	0/0	0/0
Top score	20	18*	5*
Balls bowled	1,386	987	918
Wickets	16	25	54
Bowling average	50.43	33.88	24.61
5 wickets in innings	0	0	1
10 wickets in match	0	0	0
Best bowling	3/33	3/57	5/5
Catches/stumpings	1/0	9/0	7/0
- Source: ESPNcricinfo, 27 March 2025

Akash Madhwal (born 25 November 1993) is an Indian cricketer who has played for Uttarakhand and Mumbai Indians as a bowler. He is well known for his trajectory and ability to get the ball to skid and rip through from a quick-arm action. He is known for his connection with Indian wicket-keeper batsman Rishabh Pant as his close neighbour as both live in the same area in Uttarakhand.

On 24 May 2023, he took a five-wicket haul in the eliminator match against Lucknow Super Giants, conceding only five runs. With this performance, he registered the record for best bowling figures by an uncapped player in IPL history and also won player of the match award for that match.

== Biography ==
He was born in the city of Roorkee, which is located in the state of Uttarakhand, India. He originally hails from Dungra village of Almora district, Uttarakhand. However, due to his father Ghananand who had served in MES wing of Indian Army in Roorkee, his family settled down in Roorkee nearly 30 years back.

After completing his primary and secondary education at Roorkee Public Senior Secondary School in Uttarakhand, Akash Madhwal went on to pursue a degree in civil engineering in 2016 from the College of Engineering Roorkee, which he successfully graduated from.

== Early career ==
He quit the job of engineering and picked up cricket as his professional career aspect.

He honed his skills to deliver and nail the craft of bowling yorkers during his playing days in Uttarakhand when he was only playing with tennis balls. He also enhanced a great control in delivering yorkers during his early playing days.

He was called up for trials organised by the Uttarakhand Cricket Association ever since it got affiliate with BCCI in 2018. It also eventually marked Madhwal's entry to competitive cricket at the age of 24. In 2019, he caught the attention of former Indian cricketer Wasim Jaffer who then served as the head coach of Uttarakhand as well as the current head coach of Uttarakhand Manish Jha. The duo suggested him to take up red ball and began practicing with the red ball. Jaffer decided to pick him Uttarakhand state team and Madhwal's talent was polished further especially under the helm of Manish Jha. During his normative years, he trained under Avtar Singh who also had previously coached Rishabh Pant.

== Domestic career ==
He made his Twenty20 cricket debut on 8 November 2019 for Uttarakhand in the 2019–20 Syed Mushtaq Ali Trophy. He made his first-class debut on 25 December 2019 for Uttarakhand in the 2019–20 Ranji Trophy. He made his List A debut on 21 February 2021 for Uttarakhand in the 2020–21 Vijay Hazare Trophy.

Ahead of the 2023 domestic season, he was named as the captain of the Uttarakhand side in T20s.

== IPL career ==
He was recruited by Royal Challengers Bangalore as net bowler for the 2021 Indian Premier League.

He was roped in initially by Mumbai Indians as a net bowler for the 2022 Indian Premier League but with an injury to Suryakumar Yadav, he was drafted into Mumbai Indians squad for the entirety of the season. However, Madhwal didn't play in any of the matches in 2022 IPL season.

=== Breakthrough 2023 IPL season ===
Madhwal was not a starter in Mumbai Indians playing XI during the 2023 Indian Premier League. He subsequently got his opportunity and grabbed it with both hands during the league stage match against Punjab Kings at Mohali which eventually marked his IPL debut and his arrival to the league. Although Madhwal had a tough debut conceding 37 runs off the 3 overs he bowled without a wicket, he did a fine job by bowling the last over of Punjab Kings innings where he showed his glimpses of his death bowling. He became the first Uttarakhand based home grown cricketer to play in Indian Premier League.

Madhwal's reputation grew ever since he replaced Arjun Tendulkar in the Mumbai Indians bowling lineup as he stepped as Mumbai Indians go-to reliable bowler to get the breakthroughs in important junctures of matches during the 2023 IPL. He was also compared to the likes of Jasprit Bumrah for his ability to bowl yorkers in an effective manner and to deliver yorkers in a consistent basis. He was roped in by Mumbai Indians scouting network which is known for producing and nurturing young talents. During the 2023 IPL season, he showcased his bowling repertoire and rose to prominence as Mumbai Indians go-to bowler especially in powerplay overs and in death overs especially in the absence of Jofra Archer and Jasprit Bumrah.

He stepped up in Mumbai Indians virtual knockout do or die match against Sunrisers Hyderabad in Mumbai Indians' last league phase match by returning with figures of 4/37 despite Sunrisers Hyderabad managed to post total of 200 in the board which was later chased by Mumbai Indians albeit of a century from Cameron Green. His bowling efforts eventually secured Mumbai Indians a playoff berth with Mumbai Indians taking fourth spot in the points table.

During the eliminator match against Lucknow Super Giants on 24 May 2023, Madhwal delivered his career best bowling figures in IPL by returning with figures of 5/5 in 3.3 overs to restrict Lucknow Super Giants to 101 all out in a high scoring stiff challenging run chase of 183. His figures of 5/5 is also the best bowling figures registered by the bowler in a playoff match in IPL history surpassing the 13-year-old record held by Doug Bollinger as the latter claimed 4/13 during 2010 Indian Premier League season for Chennai Super Kings in their playoff match against Deccan Chargers. He also broke Ankit Rajpoot's IPL record for registering best bowling figures by an uncapped player and also became the first bowler to take a fifer in an IPL playoff match.

He also tied the record of Anil Kumble for taking the most economical five wicket-haul with least number of runs conceded in an IPL innings and it was also his maiden five-wicket haul in IPL and T20 cricket. During the match against Lucknow Super Giants at Chennai, he delivered plenty of dot ball out of the 21 deliveries he bowled to complete his four over quota and his bowling performance literally helped Mumbai Indians to reach Qualifier 2 and to keep the Mumbai Indians hunt in the race for the possibility of reaching IPL final.

=== IPL 2025 ===
At the 2025 Indian Premier League mega auction, Madhwal was sold to Rajasthan Royals for INR 1.2 crore.
