= Mohit Sharma =

Indian cricketer (born 1988)

Personal information
- Full name: Mohit Mahipal Sharma
- Born: 18 September 1988 (age 38); Ballabhgarh, Haryana, India
- Nickname: Aashu
- Batting: Right-handed
- Bowling: Right arm fast-medium
- Role: Bowler

International information
- National side: India (2013–2015)
- ODI debut (cap 199): 1 August 2013 v Zimbabwe
- Last ODI: 25 October 2015 v South Africa
- ODI shirt no.: 6
- T20I debut (cap 47): 30 March 2014 v Australia
- Last T20I: 5 October 2015 v South Africa
- T20I shirt no.: 6

Domestic team information
- Years: Team
- 2011–2025: Haryana
- 2013–2015: Chennai Super Kings (squad no. 18)
- 2016–2018: Kings XI Punjab (squad no. 18)
- 2019: Chennai Super Kings
- 2020: Delhi Capitals
- 2023–2024: Gujarat Titans
- 2025: Delhi Capitals

Career statistics
Competition	ODI	T20I
Matches	26	8
Runs scored	31	3
Batting average	7.75	–
100s/50s	0/0	0/0
Top score	11	3*
Balls bowled	1,121	138
Wickets	31	6
Bowling average	32.90	30.83
5 wickets in innings	0	0
10 wickets in match	0	0
Best bowling	4/22	2/28
Catches/stumpings	6/–	1/–
Medal record
Men's Cricket
Representing India
ICC T20 World Cup
Runner-up	2014 Bangladesh
- Source: ESPNcricinfo, 3 April 2020

Mohit Mahipal Sharma (born 18 September 1988) is a former Indian international cricketer. He played for Haryana in domestic cricket and appeared in the Indian Premier League (IPL) for Chennai Super Kings, Kings XI Punjab, Gujarat Titans and Delhi Capitals. He was a right-arm medium fast bowler.

Mohit Sharma announced his retirement from all forms of cricket on 3 December 2025.

== Domestic and IPL career ==
Following his work with pace bowling coach Ian Pont, Sharma picked up 37 wickets in 7 games at an average of 23 in the 2012–13 Ranji Trophy. He was then contracted by the IPL franchise Chennai Super Kings for the 2013 season. He played 15 matches in 2013 Indian Premier League and took 23 wickets.

In December 2018, he was bought by the Chennai Super Kings in the player auction for the 2019 Indian Premier League for 5 crores. He was released by the Chennai Super Kings ahead of the 2020 IPL auction. In the 2020 IPL auction, he was bought by the Delhi Capitals ahead of the 2020 Indian Premier League.

On 26 March 2022, Mohit was roped in by the new franchise Gujarat Titans as a net bowler for the IPL 2022 season.

In the 2023 IPL Auction, he was bought by the Gujarat Titans, and made a major comeback, taking 27 wickets, tied for the second-highest in the season.

In 2024 IPL, Sharma broke the record of worst bowling spell in IPL history by conceding 73 runs in a game against Delhi Capitals; the unwanted distinction was previously held by Basil Thampi, for his 70-run spell. Sharma finished with 4-0-73-0 in that game.

== International career ==
Sharma made his international debut for India in 4th ODI against Zimbabwe during India's tour of Zimbabwe. Sharma bowled an economical spell (2/26 in 10 overs) and took his first wicket in his fourth over dismissing Zimbabwe opening batsman Sikandar Raza. Sharma became the second Indian after Sandeep Patil to be adjudged man of the match on ODI debut.
