= Aman Hakim Khan =

Indian cricketer (born 1996)

Personal information
- Born: 23 November 1996 (age 29); Mumbai, Maharashtra, India
- Batting: Right-handed
- Bowling: Right-arm medium
- Role: All-rounder

Domestic team information
- Years: Team
- 2020/21–2024: Mumbai
- 2024/25–present: Pondicherry
- 2022: Kolkata Knight Riders
- 2023: Delhi Capitals
- Source: ESPNcricinfo, 9 March 2021

Aman Hakim Khan (born 23 November 1996) is an Indian cricketer. He is an all-rounder who bats right-handed and bowls right-arm medium pace. Khan represents Pondicherry in domestic cricket and Chennai Super Kings in the Indian Premier League.

== Career ==
Khan made his List A debut on 9 March 2021, for Mumbai in the 2020–21 Vijay Hazare Trophy. He made his Twenty20 debut on 4 November 2021, for Mumbai in the 2021–22 Syed Mushtaq Ali Trophy.

In February 2022, he was bought by Kolkata Knight Riders in the auction for the 2022 Indian Premier League tournament. He played a single match for the team during the 2022 season, and in November 2022 was traded to the Delhi Capitals in exchange for Shardul Thakur ahead of the 2023 auction. In December 2025, he was brought by Chennai Super Kings in the mini auction for IPL 2026.
