= List of 2025 Indian Premier League personnel changes =

2025 Indian Premier League auction

General information
- Sport: Cricket
- Date: 24 – 25 November 2024
- Time: 15:30 IST (13:00 local)
- Location: Jeddah, Saudi Arabia
- Networks: Star Sports (TV); JioCinema (Digital)

Overview
- 182 total selections in 18 rounds
- League: 2025 Indian Premier League
- Teams: 10
- Most selections: 23 by Punjab Kings
- Fewest selections: 14 by Rajasthan Royals

The 2025 Indian Premier League was the 18th edition of the Indian Premier League (IPL), a professional Twenty20 (T20) cricket league held in India, organized by the Board of Control for Cricket in India (BCCI). It has been held annually since the first edition in 2008. In July 2024, the IPL Governing Council held a meeting with the owners of the franchises and announced that a mega auction would be conducted ahead of the 2025 season. It was the sixth mega auction after 2008, 2011, 2014, 2018 and 2022.

The franchises were required to submit their retention lists before 31 October 2024, and a total of 46 players were retained ahead of the auction. The auction was held on 24 and 25 November 2024 in Jeddah, Saudi Arabia, with the auction purse for each franchise set at ₹120 crore (US$12 million), the highest in the history of the IPL. A total of 1,574 players registered for the auction, of which 574 players were shortlisted to feature in the auction and 182 were sold in the auction. Rishabh Pant became the most expensive player in the history of IPL when he was bought by the Lucknow Super Giants for ₹27 crore (US$2.8 million), surpassing ₹26.75 crore (US$2.8 million) paid by the Punjab Kings for Shreyas Iyer earlier in the same auction, and ₹24.75 crore (US$2.6 million) paid by the Kolkata Knight Riders for Mitchell Starc in the 2024 auction. Vaibhav Sooryavanshi became the youngest player sold in the IPL history at the age of 13 years, being bought by the Rajasthan Royals for ₹1.1 crore (US$110,000).

Following the IPL's suspension and rescheduling, it was announced that the franchises were allowed to sign temporary replacement players in place of unavailable players as the rescheduled fixtures clashed with the international cricket calendar, notably the West Indies' tour of Ireland, the West Indies' tour of England and the World Test Championship final. These temporary replacement players were not available for retention in the 2026 auction.

== Pre-auction ==
Retired players
Date	Name	2024 team	Age	Ref.
1 June 2024	Dinesh Karthik	Royal Challengers Bengaluru	39	
24 August 2024	Shikhar Dhawan	Punjab Kings	38	
4 November 2024	Wriddhiman Saha	Gujarat Titans	40	

== Player retention ==
=== Retention policy ===
The ten franchises were allowed to retain a maximum of six players each from their squad, the highest number allowed before any of the mega auctions. The six players could consist of a maximum of five capped players (including Indian and overseas players) and two uncapped players. The auction purse for each franchise was set at ₹120 crore (US$12 million), the highest in the history of the IPL. Franchises were deducted a specific amount from the auction purse for every retained player. Franchises who did not retain the maximum number of players were allowed Right-to-Match (RTM) cards at the auction.

=== Retained players ===
The franchises were required to submit their retention lists before 31 October 2024.

- Sources: Cricinfo

Chennai Super Kings
No.	Player	Nationality	Salary
1	Ruturaj Gaikwad	India	₹18 crore (US$1.9 million)
2	Ravindra Jadeja	India	₹18 crore (US$1.9 million)
3	Matheesha Pathirana	Sri Lanka	₹13 crore (US$1.3 million)
4	Shivam Dube	India	₹12 crore (US$1.2 million)
5	MS Dhoni	India	₹4 crore (US$420,000)

Delhi Capitals
No.	Player	Nationality	Salary
1	Axar Patel	India	₹16.5 crore (US$1.7 million)
2	Kuldeep Yadav	India	₹13.25 crore (US$1.4 million)
3	Tristan Stubbs	South Africa	₹10 crore (US$1.0 million).
4	Abhishek Porel	India	₹4 crore (US$420,000)

Gujarat Titans
No.	Player	Nationality	Salary
1	Rashid Khan	Afghanistan	₹18 crore (US$1.9 million)
2	Shubman Gill	India	₹16.5 crore (US$1.7 million)
3	Sai Sudharsan	India	₹8.5 crore (US$880,000)
4	Rahul Tewatia	India	₹4 crore (US$420,000)
5	Shahrukh Khan	India	₹4 crore (US$420,000)

Kolkata Knight Riders
No.	Player	Nationality	Salary
1	Rinku Singh	India	₹13 crore (US$1.3 million)
2	Varun Chakravarthy	India	₹12 crore (US$1.2 million)
3	Sunil Narine	West Indies	₹12 crore (US$1.2 million)
4	Andre Russell	West Indies	₹12 crore (US$1.2 million)
5	Ramandeep Singh	India	₹4 crore (US$420,000)
6	Harshit Rana	India	₹4 crore (US$420,000)

Lucknow Super Giants
No.	Player	Nationality	Salary
1	Nicholas Pooran	West Indies	₹21 crore (US$2.2 million)
2	Ravi Bishnoi	India	₹11 crore (US$1.1 million)
3	Mayank Yadav	India	₹11 crore (US$1.1 million)
4	Mohsin Khan	India	₹4 crore (US$420,000)
5	Ayush Badoni	India	₹4 crore (US$420,000)

Mumbai Indians
No.	Player	Nationality	Salary
1	Jasprit Bumrah	India	₹18 crore (US$1.9 million)
2	Suryakumar Yadav	India	₹16.35 crore (US$1.7 million)
3	Hardik Pandya	India	₹16.35 crore (US$1.7 million)
4	Rohit Sharma	India	₹16.3 crore (US$1.7 million)
5	Tilak Varma	India	₹8 crore (US$830,000)

Punjab Kings
No.	Player	Nationality	Salary
1	Shashank Singh	India	₹5.5 crore (US$570,000)
2	Prabhsimran Singh	India	₹4 crore (US$420,000)

Rajasthan Royals
No.	Player	Nationality	Salary
1	Sanju Samson	India	₹18 crore (US$1.9 million)
2	Yashasvi Jaiswal	India	₹18 crore (US$1.9 million)
3	Dhruv Jurel	India	₹14 crore (US$1.5 million)
4	Riyan Parag	India	₹14 crore (US$1.5 million)
5	Shimron Hetmyer	West Indies	₹11 crore (US$1.1 million)
6	Sandeep Sharma	India	₹4 crore (US$420,000)

Royal Challengers Bengaluru
No.	Player	Nationality	Salary
1	Virat Kohli	India	₹21 crore (US$2.2 million)
2	Rajat Patidar	India	₹11 crore (US$1.1 million)
3	Yash Dayal	India	₹5 crore (US$520,000)

Sunrisers Hyderabad
No.	Player	Nationality	Salary
1	Heinrich Klaasen	South Africa	₹23 crore (US$2.4 million)
2	Pat Cummins	Australia	₹18 crore (US$1.9 million)
3	Abhishek Sharma	India	₹14 crore (US$1.5 million)
4	Travis Head	Australia	₹14 crore (US$1.5 million)
5	Nitish Kumar Reddy	India	₹6 crore (US$620,000)

== Auction ==
Any player willing to play in the IPL was required to register for the auction. Players who did not register for the mega auction would become ineligible to participate in the mini-auctions held in subsequent years. Any auctioned player withdrawing before the season without legitimate reason or injury would be banned from the IPL for a period of two years. Any Indian capped player who had not been named in the starting XI in international cricket (Test, ODI, T20I) in the preceding five calendar years or did not have a central contract with the BCCI was considered as an uncapped player for the auction. The salary cap of a player would consist of auction purse, incremental performance pay and match fees. Each playing member (including the impact player) would get a match fee of ₹7.5 lakh (US$7,800) in addition to the auctioned price.

The auction was held on 24 and 25 November 2024 in Jeddah, Saudi Arabia. Mallika Sagar was appointed as the auctioneer for the second consecutive time after she hosted the 2024 auction. A total of 1,574 players registered for the auction, of which 574 players were shortlisted to feature in the auction.

=== Summary ===
Summary by teams
Team	Retained			Bought			Overall		
Team	Capped	Uncapped	Total	Capped	Uncapped	Total	Capped	Uncapped	Total
Chennai Super Kings	4	1	5	10	10	20	14	11	25
Delhi Capitals	3	1	4	9	10	19	12	11	23
Gujarat Titans	3	2	5	12	8	20	16	9	25
Kolkata Knight Riders	4	2	6	10	5	15	14	7	21
Lucknow Super Giants	3	2	5	9	10	19	12	12	24
Mumbai Indians	5	0	5	8	10	18	13	10	23
Punjab Kings	0	2	2	12	11	23	12	13	25
Rajasthan Royals	5	1	6	7	7	14	12	8	20
Royal Challengers Bengaluru	2	1	3	12	7	19	14	8	22
Sunrisers Hyderabad	5	0	5	8	7	15	13	7	20
Total	35	11	46	97	85	182	132	96	228

=== Sold players ===
Two sets of marquee players went up for bidding first followed by 15 sets of players divided based on their specialisation: batters, all-rounders, wicket keeper batters, fast bowlers and spin bowlers; and status: capped and uncapped. After player no. 116, the auction entered its accelerated phase, covering all the remaining players. During the accelerated round, players were presented based on the franchises' preference.

- Sources: Cricinfo, Olympics.com

† denotes players bought by RTM cards.

Set 1: marquee players (M1)
No.	Name	Country	Role	No. of IPL matches	Category	Base price (₹ lakhs)	2025 IPL team	Auctioned price (₹ lakhs)	2024 IPL team
1	Jos Buttler	England	Wicket-keeper	107	Capped	200	Gujarat Titans	1575	Rajasthan Royals
2	Shreyas Iyer	India	Batter	116	Capped	200	Punjab Kings	2675	Kolkata Knight Riders
3	Rishabh Pant	India	Batter	111	Capped	200	Lucknow Super Giants	2700	Delhi Capitals
4	Kagiso Rabada	South Africa	Bowler	80	Capped	200	Gujarat Titans	1075	Punjab Kings
5	Arshdeep Singh †	India	Bowler	65	Capped	200	Punjab Kings	1800	Punjab Kings
6	Mitchell Starc	Australia	Bowler	41	Capped	200	Delhi Capitals	1175	Kolkata Knight Riders

Set 2: marquee players (M2)
No.	Name	Country	Role	No. of IPL matches	Category	Base price (₹ lakhs)	2025 IPL team	Auctioned price (₹ lakhs)	2024 IPL team
7	Yuzvendra Chahal	India	Bowler	160	Capped	200	Punjab Kings	1800	Rajasthan Royals
8	Liam Livingstone	England	All-rounder	39	Capped	200	Royal Challengers Bengaluru	875	Punjab Kings
9	David Miller	South Africa	Batter	130	Capped	150	Lucknow Super Giants	750	Gujarat Titans
10	KL Rahul	India	Wicket-keeper	132	Capped	200	Delhi Capitals	1400	Lucknow Super Giants
11	Mohammed Shami	India	Bowler	110	Capped	200	Sunrisers Hyderabad	1000	Gujarat Titans
12	Mohammed Siraj	India	Bowler	93	Capped	200	Gujarat Titans	1225	Royal Challengers Bengaluru

Set 3: capped batters (BA1)
No.	Name	Country	No. of IPL matches	Base price (₹ lakhs)	2025 IPL team	Auctioned price (₹ lakhs)	2024 IPL team
13	Harry Brook	England	11	200	Delhi Capitals	625	Delhi Capitals
14	Devon Conway	New Zealand	23	200	Chennai Super Kings	625	Chennai Super Kings
15	Jake Fraser-McGurk †	Australia	9	200	Delhi Capitals	900	Delhi Capitals
16	Aiden Markram	South Africa	44	200	Lucknow Super Giants	200	Sunrisers Hyderabad
17	Devdutt Padikkal	India	64	200	Royal Challengers Bengaluru	200	Lucknow Super Giants
18	Rahul Tripathi	India	95	75	Chennai Super Kings	340	Sunrisers Hyderabad

Set 4: capped all-rounders (AL1)
No.	Name	Country	No. of IPL matches	Base price (₹ lakhs)	2025 IPL team	Auctioned price (₹ lakhs)	2024 IPL team
20	Ravichandran Ashwin	India	212	200	Chennai Super Kings	975	Rajasthan Royals
21	Venkatesh Iyer	India	51	200	Kolkata Knight Riders	2375	Kolkata Knight Riders
22	Mitchell Marsh	Australia	42	200	Lucknow Super Giants	340	Delhi Capitals
23	Glenn Maxwell	Australia	134	200	Punjab Kings	420	Royal Challengers Bengaluru
24	Harshal Patel	India	106	200	Sunrisers Hyderabad	800	Punjab Kings
25	Rachin Ravindra †	New Zealand	10	150	Chennai Super Kings	400	Chennai Super Kings
26	Marcus Stoinis	Australia	96	200	Punjab Kings	1100	Lucknow Super Giants

Set 5: capped wicket-keepers (WK1)
No.	Name	Country	No. of IPL matches	Base price (₹ lakhs)	2025 IPL team	Auctioned price (₹ lakhs)	2024 IPL team
28	Quinton de Kock	South Africa	107	200	Kolkata Knight Riders	360	Lucknow Super Giants
29	Rahmanullah Gurbaz	Afghanistan	14	200	Kolkata Knight Riders	200	Kolkata Knight Riders
30	Ishan Kishan	India	104	200	Sunrisers Hyderabad	1125	Mumbai Indians
31	Phil Salt	England	21	200	Royal Challengers Bengaluru	1150	Kolkata Knight Riders
32	Jitesh Sharma	India	40	100	Royal Challengers Bengaluru	1100	Punjab Kings

Set 6: capped fast bowlers (FA1)
No.	Name	Country	No. of IPL matches	Base price (₹ lakhs)	2025 IPL team	Auctioned price (₹ lakhs)	2024 IPL team
33	Khaleel Ahmed	India	57	200	Chennai Super Kings	480	Delhi Capitals
575*	Jofra Archer	England	40	200	Rajasthan Royals	1250	—N/a
34	Trent Boult	New Zealand	104	200	Mumbai Indians	1250	Rajasthan Royals
35	Josh Hazlewood	Australia	27	200	Royal Challengers Bengaluru	1250	—N/a
36	Avesh Khan	India	63	200	Lucknow Super Giants	975	Rajasthan Royals
37	Prasidh Krishna	India	51	200	Gujarat Titans	950	Rajasthan Royals
38	T. Natarajan	India	61	200	Delhi Capitals	1075	Sunrisers Hyderabad
39	Anrich Nortje	South Africa	46	200	Kolkata Knight Riders	650	Delhi Capitals

Set 7: capped spin bowlers (SP1)
No.	Name	Country	No. of IPL matches	Base price (₹ lakhs)	2025 IPL team	Auctioned price (₹ lakhs)	2024 IPL team
40	Noor Ahmad	Afghanistan	23	200	Chennai Super Kings	1000	Gujarat Titans
41	Rahul Chahar	India	78	100	Sunrisers Hyderabad	320	Punjab Kings
42	Wanindu Hasaranga	Sri Lanka	26	200	Rajasthan Royals	525	Sunrisers Hyderabad
44	Maheesh Theekshana	Sri Lanka	27	200	Rajasthan Royals	440	Chennai Super Kings
45	Adam Zampa	Australia	20	200	Sunrisers Hyderabad	240	Rajasthan Royals

Set 8: uncapped batters (UBA1)
No.	Name	Country	No. of IPL matches	Base price (₹ lakhs)	2025 IPL team	Auctioned price (₹ lakhs)	2024 IPL team
47	Abhinav Manohar	India	18	30	Sunrisers Hyderabad	320	Gujarat Titans
48	Karun Nair	India	76	30	Delhi Capitals	50	—N/a
49	Angkrish Raghuvanshi	India	10	30	Kolkata Knight Riders	300	Kolkata Knight Riders
51	Atharva Taide	India	9	30	Sunrisers Hyderabad	30	Punjab Kings
52	Nehal Wadhera	India	20	30	Punjab Kings	420	Mumbai Indians

Set 9: uncapped all-rounders (UAL1)
No.	Name	Country	No. of IPL matches	Base price (₹ lakhs)	2025 IPL team	Auctioned price (₹ lakhs)	2024 IPL team
53	Harpreet Brar	India	41	30	Punjab Kings	150	Punjab Kings
54	Naman Dhir †	India	7	30	Mumbai Indians	525	Mumbai Indians
55	Mahipal Lomror	India	40	30	Gujarat Titans	170	Royal Challengers Bengaluru
56	Sameer Rizvi	India	9	30	Delhi Capitals	95	Chennai Super Kings
57	Abdul Samad	India	50	30	Lucknow Super Giants	420	Sunrisers Hyderabad
58	Vijay Shankar	India	72	30	Chennai Super Kings	120	Gujarat Titans
59	Ashutosh Sharma	India	11	30	Delhi Capitals	380	Punjab Kings
60	Nishant Sindhu	India	—N/a	30	Gujarat Titans	30	Chennai Super Kings

Set 10: uncapped wicket-keepers (UWK1)
No.	Name	Country	No. of IPL matches	Base price (₹ lakhs)	2025 IPL team	Auctioned price (₹ lakhs)	2024 IPL team
62	Aryan Juyal	India	—N/a	30	Lucknow Super Giants	30	—N/a
63	Kumar Kushagra	India	—N/a	30	Gujarat Titans	65	Gujarat Titans
64	Robin Minz	India	—N/a	30	Mumbai Indians	65	Gujarat Titans
65	Anuj Rawat	India	24	30	Gujarat Titans	30	Royal Challengers Bengaluru
66	Luvnith Sisodia	India	—N/a	30	Kolkata Knight Riders	30	—N/a
67	Vishnu Vinod	India	6	30	Punjab Kings	95	Mumbai Indians

Set 11: uncapped fast bowlers (UFA1)
No.	Name	Country	No. of IPL matches	Base price (₹ lakhs)	2025 IPL team	Auctioned price (₹ lakhs)	2024 IPL team
69	Vaibhav Arora	India	20	30	Kolkata Knight Riders	180	Kolkata Knight Riders
70	Rasikh Salam Dar	India	11	30	Royal Challengers Bengaluru	600	Delhi Capitals
71	Akash Madhwal	India	12	30	Rajasthan Royals	120	Mumbai Indians
72	Mohit Sharma	India	111	50	Delhi Capitals	220	Gujarat Titans
73	Simarjeet Singh	India	10	30	Sunrisers Hyderabad	150	Chennai Super Kings
74	Yash Thakur	India	19	30	Punjab Kings	160	Lucknow Super Giants
76	Vijaykumar Vyshak	India	11	30	Punjab Kings	180	Royal Challengers Bengaluru

Set 12: uncapped spin bowlers (USP1)
No.	Name	Country	No. of IPL matches	Base price (₹ lakhs)	2025 IPL team	Auctioned price (₹ lakhs)	2024 IPL team
78	Shreyas Gopal	India	52	30	Chennai Super Kings	30	Mumbai Indians
79	Mayank Markande	India	37	30	Kolkata Knight Riders	30	Sunrisers Hyderabad
80	Suyash Sharma	India	13	30	Royal Challengers Bengaluru	260	Kolkata Knight Riders
81	Karn Sharma	India	84	50	Mumbai Indians	50	Royal Challengers Bengaluru
82	Kumar Kartikeya	India	12	30	Rajasthan Royals	30	Mumbai Indians
83	Manav Suthar	India	—N/a	30	Gujarat Titans	30	Gujarat Titans

Set 13: capped batters (BA2)
No.	Name	Country	No. of IPL matches	Base price (₹ lakhs)	2025 IPL team	Auctioned price (₹ lakhs)	2024 IPL team
85	Faf du Plessis	South Africa	145	200	Delhi Capitals	200	Royal Challengers Bengaluru
86	Glenn Phillips	New Zealand	8	200	Gujarat Titans	200	Sunrisers Hyderabad
87	Rovman Powell	West Indies	27	150	Kolkata Knight Riders	150	Rajasthan Royals
88	Ajinkya Rahane	India	185	150	Kolkata Knight Riders	150	Chennai Super Kings

Set 14: capped all-rounders (AL2)
No.	Name	Country	No. of IPL matches	Base price (₹ lakhs)	2025 IPL team	Auctioned price (₹ lakhs)	2024 IPL team
91	Sam Curran	England	59	200	Chennai Super Kings	240	Punjab Kings
92	Marco Jansen	South Africa	21	125	Punjab Kings	700	Sunrisers Hyderabad
94	Krunal Pandya	India	127	200	Royal Challengers Bengaluru	575	Lucknow Super Giants
95	Nitish Rana	India	107	150	Rajasthan Royals	420	Kolkata Knight Riders
96	Washington Sundar	India	61	200	Gujarat Titans	320	Sunrisers Hyderabad

Set 15: capped wicket-keepers (WK2)
No.	Name	Country	No. of IPL matches	Base price (₹ lakhs)	2025 IPL team	Auctioned price (₹ lakhs)	2024 IPL team
100	Donovan Ferreira	South Africa	2	75	Delhi Capitals	75	Rajasthan Royals
102	Josh Inglis	Australia	—N/a	200	Punjab Kings	260	—N/a
103	Ryan Rickelton	South Africa	—N/a	100	Mumbai Indians	100	—N/a

Set 16: capped fast bowlers (FA2)
No.	Name	Country	No. of IPL matches	Base price (₹ lakhs)	2025 IPL team	Auctioned price (₹ lakhs)	2024 IPL team
104	Deepak Chahar	India	81	200	Mumbai Indians	925	Chennai Super Kings
105	Gerald Coetzee	South Africa	10	125	Gujarat Titans	240	Mumbai Indians
106	Akash Deep	India	8	100	Lucknow Super Giants	800	Royal Challengers Bengaluru
107	Tushar Deshpande	India	36	100	Rajasthan Royals	650	Chennai Super Kings
108	Lockie Ferguson	New Zealand	45	200	Punjab Kings	200	Royal Challengers Bengaluru
109	Bhuvneshwar Kumar	India	176	200	Royal Challengers Bengaluru	1075	Sunrisers Hyderabad
110	Mukesh Kumar †	India	20	200	Delhi Capitals	800	Delhi Capitals

Set 17: capped spin bowlers (SP2)
No.	Name	Country	No. of IPL matches	Base price (₹ lakhs)	2025 IPL team	Auctioned price (₹ lakhs)	2024 IPL team
111	Allah Ghazanfar	Afghanistan	—N/a	75	Mumbai Indians	480	Kolkata Knight Riders

Accelerated round
No.	Name	Country	Role	No. of IPL matches	Category	Base price (₹ lakhs)	2025 IPL team	Auctioned price (₹ lakhs)	2024 IPL team
118	Swastik Chikara	India	Batter	—N/a	Uncapped	30	Royal Challengers Bengaluru	30	Delhi Capitals
120	Shubham Dubey	India	Batter	4	Uncapped	30	Rajasthan Royals	80	Rajasthan Royals
123	Shaik Rasheed	India	Batter	—N/a	Uncapped	30	Chennai Super Kings	30	Chennai Super Kings
124	Himmat Singh	India	Batter	—N/a	Uncapped	30	Lucknow Super Giants	30	—N/a
126	Anshul Kamboj	India	All-rounder	3	Uncapped	30	Chennai Super Kings	340	Mumbai Indians
127	Arshad Khan	India	All-rounder	10	Uncapped	30	Gujarat Titans	130	Lucknow Super Giants
128	Darshan Nalkande	India	All-rounder	5	Uncapped	30	Delhi Capitals	30	Gujarat Titans
130	Anukul Roy	India	All-rounder	11	Uncapped	30	Kolkata Knight Riders	40	Kolkata Knight Riders
131	Swapnil Singh †	India	All-rounder	14	Uncapped	30	Royal Challengers Bengaluru	50	Royal Challengers Bengaluru
134	Vansh Bedi	India	Wicket-keeper	—N/a	Uncapped	30	Chennai Super Kings	55	—N/a
138	Kunal Rathore	India	Wicket-keeper	—N/a	Uncapped	30	Rajasthan Royals	30	Rajasthan Royals
140	Gurnoor Brar	India	Bowler	1	Uncapped	30	Gujarat Titans	130	Gujarat Titans
141	Mukesh Choudhary	India	Bowler	14	Uncapped	30	Chennai Super Kings	30	Chennai Super Kings
146	Arjun Tendulkar	India	Bowler	5	Uncapped	30	Mumbai Indians	30	Mumbai Indians
147	Zeeshan Ansari	India	Bowler	—N/a	Uncapped	30	Sunrisers Hyderabad	40	—N/a
150	Manimaran Siddharth	India	Bowler	3	Uncapped	30	Lucknow Super Giants	75	Lucknow Super Giants
151	Digvesh Singh	India	Bowler	3	Uncapped	30	Lucknow Super Giants	30	—N/a
157	Manish Pandey	India	Batter	171	Capped	75	Kolkata Knight Riders	75	Kolkata Knight Riders
159	Sherfane Rutherford	West Indies	Batter	10	Capped	150	Gujarat Titans	260	Kolkata Knight Riders
162	Shahbaz Ahmed	India	All-rounder	55	Capped	100	Lucknow Super Giants	240	Sunrisers Hyderabad
164	Tim David	Australia	All-rounder	38	Capped	200	Royal Challengers Bengaluru	300	Mumbai Indians
165	Deepak Hooda	India	All-rounder	118	Capped	75	Chennai Super Kings	170	Lucknow Super Giants
166	Will Jacks	England	All-rounder	8	Capped	200	Mumbai Indians	525	Royal Challengers Bengaluru
167	Azmatullah Omarzai	Afghanistan	All-rounder	7	Capped	150	Punjab Kings	240	Gujarat Titans
168	Sai Kishore †	India	All-rounder	10	Capped	75	Gujarat Titans	200	Gujarat Titans
169	Romario Shepherd	West Indies	All-rounder	10	Capped	150	Royal Challengers Bengaluru	150	Mumbai Indians
179	Spencer Johnson	Australia	Bowler	5	Capped	200	Kolkata Knight Riders	280	Gujarat Titans
180	Umran Malik	India	Bowler	26	Capped	75	Kolkata Knight Riders	75	Sunrisers Hyderabad
182	Ishant Sharma	India	Bowler	109	Capped	75	Gujarat Titans	75	Delhi Capitals
183	Nuwan Thushara	Sri Lanka	Bowler	7	Capped	75	Royal Challengers Bengaluru	160	Mumbai Indians
185	Jaydev Unadkat	India	Bowler	105	Capped	100	Sunrisers Hyderabad	100	Sunrisers Hyderabad
193	Sachin Baby	India	Batter	19	Uncapped	30	Sunrisers Hyderabad	30	Sunrisers Hyderabad
195	Harnoor Singh	India	Batter	—N/a	Uncapped	30	Punjab Kings	30	—N/a
198	Andre Siddarth	India	Batter	—N/a	Uncapped	30	Chennai Super Kings	30	—N/a
201	Yudhvir Singh	India	All-rounder	5	Uncapped	30	Rajasthan Royals	35	Lucknow Super Giants
203	Rajvardhan Hangargekar	India	All-rounder	2	Uncapped	30	Lucknow Super Giants	30	Chennai Super Kings
205	Arshin Kulkarni	India	All-rounder	2	Uncapped	30	Lucknow Super Giants	30	Lucknow Super Giants
217	Ashwani Kumar	India	Bowler	—N/a	Uncapped	30	Mumbai Indians	30	—N/a
220	Akash Singh	India	Bowler	7	Uncapped	30	Lucknow Super Giants	30	Sunrisers Hyderabad
221	Gurjapneet Singh	India	Bowler	2	Uncapped	30	Chennai Super Kings	220	—N/a
231	Matthew Breetzke	South Africa	Batter	—N/a	Capped	—N/a	Lucknow Super Giants	75	—N/a
244	Mitchell Santner	New Zealand	All-rounder	18	Capped	200	Mumbai Indians	200	Chennai Super Kings
245	Jayant Yadav	India	All-rounder	20	Capped	75	Gujarat Titans	75	Gujarat Titans
252	Fazalhaq Farooqi	Afghanistan	Bowler	7	Capped	200	Rajasthan Royals	200	Sunrisers Hyderabad
256	Kwena Maphaka	South Africa	Bowler	2	Capped	75	Rajasthan Royals	150	Mumbai Indians
257	Kuldeep Sen	India	Bowler	12	Capped	75	Punjab Kings	80	Rajasthan Royals
258	Reece Topley	England	Bowler	5	Capped	75	Mumbai Indians	75	Royal Challengers Bengaluru
259	Lizaad Williams	South Africa	Bowler	2	Capped	75	Mumbai Indians	75	Delhi Capitals
269	Priyansh Arya	India	All-rounder	—N/a	Uncapped	30	Punjab Kings	380	—N/a
270	Manoj Bhandage	India	All-rounder	—N/a	Uncapped	30	Royal Challengers Bengaluru	30	Royal Challengers Bengaluru
271	Praveen Dubey	India	All-rounder	4	Uncapped	30	Punjab Kings	30	Delhi Capitals
272	Ajay Mandal	India	All-rounder	—N/a	Uncapped	30	Delhi Capitals	30	Chennai Super Kings
274	Vipraj Nigam	India	All-rounder	—N/a	Uncapped	30	Delhi Capitals	50	—N/a
281	Krishnan Shrijith	India	All-rounder	—N/a	Uncapped	30	Mumbai Indians	30	—N/a
296	Mohit Rathee	India	Bowler	1	Uncapped	30	Royal Challengers Bengaluru	30	—N/a
306	Jacob Bethell	England	All-rounder	—N/a	Capped	125	Royal Challengers Bengaluru	260	—N/a
307	Brydon Carse	England	All-rounder	—N/a	Capped	100	Sunrisers Hyderabad	100	—N/a
308	Aaron Hardie	Australia	All-rounder	—N/a	Capped	125	Punjab Kings	125	—N/a
311	Kamindu Mendis	Sri Lanka	All-rounder	—N/a	Capped	75	Sunrisers Hyderabad	75	—N/a
314	Dushmantha Chameera	Sri Lanka	Bowler	13	Capped	75	Delhi Capitals	75	Lucknow Super Giants
315	Nathan Ellis	Australia	Bowler	16	Capped	100	Chennai Super Kings	200	Punjab Kings
316	Shamar Joseph †	West Indies	Bowler	1	Capped	75	Lucknow Super Giants	75	Lucknow Super Giants
325	Aniket Verma	India	Batter	—N/a	Uncapped	30	Sunrisers Hyderabad	30	—N/a
329	Raj Angad Bawa	India	All-rounder	2	Uncapped	30	Mumbai Indians	30	—N/a
331	Musheer Khan	India	All-rounder	—N/a	Uncapped	30	Punjab Kings	30	—N/a
332	Manvanth Kumar L	India	All-rounder	—N/a	Uncapped	30	Delhi Capitals	30	—N/a
334	Suryansh Shedge	India	All-rounder	—N/a	Uncapped	30	Punjab Kings	30	—N/a
346	Kulwant Khejroliya	India	Bowler	7	Uncapped	30	Gujarat Titans	30	—N/a
350	Prince Yadav	India	All-rounder	—N/a	Uncapped	30	Lucknow Super Giants	30	—N/a
363	Jamie Overton	England	All-rounder	—N/a	Capped	150	Chennai Super Kings	150	—N/a
366	Xavier Bartlett	Australia	Bowler	—N/a	Capped	75	Punjab Kings	80	—N/a
369	Lungi Ngidi	South Africa	Bowler	—N/a	Capped	30	Royal Challengers Bengaluru	100	Delhi Capitals
382	Yuvraj Chaudhary	India	All-rounder	—N/a	Uncapped	30	Lucknow Super Giants	30	—N/a
385	Kamlesh Nagarkoti	India	All-rounder	12	Uncapped	30	Chennai Super Kings	30	—N/a
401	Abhinandan Singh	India	Bowler	—N/a	Uncapped	30	Royal Challengers Bengaluru	30	—N/a
405	Karim Janat	Afghanistan	All-rounder	—N/a	Capped	30	Gujarat Titans	75	—N/a
416	Pyla Avinash	India	Batter	—N/a	Uncapped	30	Punjab Kings	30	—N/a
425	Ramakrishna Ghosh	India	All-rounder	—N/a	Uncapped	30	Chennai Super Kings	30	—N/a
453	Bevon Jacobs	New Zealand	Batter	—N/a	Uncapped	30	Mumbai Indians	30	—N/a
470	Ashok Sharma	India	Bowler	—N/a	Uncapped	30	Rajasthan Royals	30	—N/a
491	Vaibhav Sooryavanshi	India	Batter	—N/a	Uncapped	30	Rajasthan Royals	110	—N/a
529	Eshan Malinga	Sri Lanka	Bowler	—N/a	Uncapped	30	Sunrisers Hyderabad	120	—N/a
557	Tripurana Vijay	India	All-rounder	—N/a	Uncapped	30	Delhi Capitals	30	—N/a
565	Madhav Tiwari	India	All-rounder	—N/a	Uncapped	30	Delhi Capitals	40	—N/a
572	Vignesh Puthur	India	All-rounder	—N/a	Uncapped	30	Mumbai Indians	30	—N/a

== Support staff changes ==
Support staff changes for the 2025 Indian Premier League
Team	Position	Outgoing	Incoming	Ref.
Chennai Super Kings	Bowling coach	Dwayne Bravo	—N/a	
Delhi Capitals	Head coach	Ricky Ponting	Hemang Badani	
Delhi Capitals	Assistant coach	Pravin Amre; Ajit Agarkar	Matthew Mott	
Delhi Capitals	Bowling coach	James Hopes	Munaf Patel	
Delhi Capitals	Fielding coach	Biju George	Anton Roux; Gnaneswara Rao	
Delhi Capitals	Mentor	—N/a	Kevin Pietersen	
Gujarat Titans	Assistant coach	Mithun Manhas	Matthew Wade	
Gujarat Titans	Batting coach and mentor	Gary Kirsten	Parthiv Patel	
Kolkata Knight Riders	Assistant coach	Abhishek Nayar; Omkar Salvi; Ryan ten Doeschate	Ottis Gibson; Carl Crowe	
Kolkata Knight Riders	Mentor	Gautam Gambhir	Dwayne Bravo	
Lucknow Super Giants	Mentor	—N/a	Zaheer Khan	
Mumbai Indians	Head coach	Mark Boucher	Mahela Jayawardene	
Mumbai Indians	Bowling coach	—N/a	Paras Mhambrey	
Mumbai Indians	Fielding coach	James Pamment	Carl Hopkinson	
Punjab Kings	Head coach	Trevor Bayliss	Ricky Ponting	
Punjab Kings	Bowling coach	Charl Langeveldt	James Hopes	
Rajasthan Royals	Head coach	Kumar Sangakkara	Rahul Dravid	
Rajasthan Royals	Batting coach	—N/a	Vikram Rathour	
Royal Challengers Bengaluru	Batting coach and mentor	Neil McKenzie	Dinesh Karthik	
Royal Challengers Bengaluru	Bowling coach	Adam Griffith	Omkar Salvi	
Sunrisers Hyderabad	Batting coach	Hemang Badani	—N/a	
Sunrisers Hyderabad	Bowling coach	Dale Steyn	James Franklin	

== Withdrawn players ==
The following players were ruled out and/or unavailable for the rest of the season due to either injury or national duties. The franchises were allowed to pick a replacement player from the unsold players at the auction to replace the withdrawn players.

‡ denotes temporary replacement players.

Withdrawn players from the 2025 Indian Premier League
Player	Team	Auctioned/retention price	Reason	Withdrawal announcement date	Replacement player	Replacement player's price	Signing date	Ref.
Allah Mohammad Ghazanfar	Mumbai Indians	₹4.80 crore (US$500,000)	Back injury	16 February 2025	Mujeeb Ur Rahman	₹2 crore (US$210,000)	16 February 2025	
Brydon Carse	Sunrisers Hyderabad	₹1 crore (US$100,000)	Toe injury	6 March 2025	Wiaan Mulder	₹75 lakh (US$78,000)	6 March 2025	
Lizaad Williams	Mumbai Indians	₹75 lakh (US$78,000)	Knee injury	8 March 2025	Corbin Bosch	₹75 lakh (US$78,000)	8 March 2025	
Harry Brook	Delhi Capitals	₹6.25 crore (US$650,000)	National duty	9 March 2025	Sediqullah Atal	₹1.25 crore (US$130,000)	7 May 2025	
Umran Malik	Kolkata Knight Riders	₹75 lakh (US$78,000)	Injury	16 March 2025	Chetan Sakariya	₹75 lakh (US$78,000)	16 March 2025	
Mohsin Khan	Lucknow Super Giants	₹4 crore (US$420,000)	ACL tear	23 March 2025	Shardul Thakur	₹2 crore (US$210,000)	23 March 2025	
Ruturaj Gaikwad	Chennai Super Kings	₹18 crore (US$1.9 million)	Elbow injury	10 April 2025	Ayush Mhatre	₹75 lakh (US$78,000)	14 April 2025	
Glenn Phillips	Gujarat Titans	₹2 crore (US$210,000)	Groin injury	12 April 2025	Dasun Shanaka	₹75 lakh (US$78,000)	17 April 2025	
Lockie Ferguson	Punjab Kings	₹2 crore (US$210,000)	Hamstring injury	13 April 2025	Kyle Jamieson ‡	₹2 crore (US$210,000)	15 May 2025	
Adam Zampa	Sunrisers Hyderabad	₹2.40 crore (US$250,000)	Shoulder injury	14 April 2025	Smaran Ravichandran	₹30 lakh (US$31,000)	14 April 2025	
Gurjapneet Singh	Chennai Super Kings	₹2.2 crore (US$230,000)	Injury	18 April 2025	Dewald Brevis	₹2.2 crore (US$230,000)	18 April 2025	
Vignesh Puthur	Mumbai Indians	₹30 lakh (US$31,000)	Shin bones injury	1 May 2025	Raghu Sharma	₹30 lakh (US$31,000)	1 May 2025	
Glenn Maxwell	Punjab Kings	₹4.2 crore (US$440,000)	Finger injury	1 May 2025	Mitchell Owen	₹3 crore (US$310,000)	3 May 2025	
Vansh Bedi	Chennai Super Kings	₹55 lakh (US$57,000)	Ankle injury	5 May 2025	Urvil Patel	₹30 lakh (US$31,000)	5 May 2025	
Smaran Ravichandran	Sunrisers Hyderabad	₹30 lakh (US$31,000)	Injury	5 May 2025	Harsh Dubey	₹30 lakh (US$31,000)	5 May 2025	
Devdutt Padikkal	Royal Challengers Bengaluru	₹2 crore (US$210,000)	Right hamstring injury	7 May 2025	Mayank Agarwal	₹1 crore (US$100,000)	7 May 2025	
Nitish Rana	Rajasthan Royals	₹4.2 crore (US$440,000)	Calf injury	8 May 2025	Lhuan-dre Pretorius	₹30 lakh (US$31,000)	8 May 2025	
Sandeep Sharma	Rajasthan Royals	₹4 crore (US$420,000)	Finger injury	8 May 2025	Nandre Burger	₹3.5 crore (US$360,000)	8 May 2025	
Jake Fraser-McGurk	Delhi Capitals	₹9 crore (US$930,000)	Personal reasons	14 May 2025	Mustafizur Rahman ‡	₹6 crore (US$620,000)	14 May 2025	
Jos Buttler	Gujarat Titans	₹15.75 crore (US$1.6 million)	National duty	15 May 2025	Kusal Mendis ‡	₹75 lakh (US$78,000)	15 May 2025	
Mayank Yadav	Lucknow Super Giants	₹11 crore (US$1.1 million)	Back injury	15 May 2025	Will O'Rourke ‡	₹3 crore (US$310,000)	15 May 2025	
Rovman Powell	Kolkata Knight Riders	₹1.5 crore (US$160,000)	Tonsils	15 May 2025	Shivam Shukla ‡	₹30 lakh (US$31,000)	19 May 2025	
Lungi Ngidi	Royal Challengers Bengaluru	₹1 crore (US$100,000)	National duty	19 May 2025	Blessing Muzarabani ‡	₹75 lakh (US$78,000)	26 May 2025	
Will Jacks	Mumbai Indians	₹5.25 crore (US$550,000)	National duty	20 May 2025	Jonny Bairstow ‡	₹5.25 crore (US$550,000)	19 May 2025	
Ryan Rickelton	Mumbai Indians	₹1 crore (US$100,000)	National duty	20 May 2025	Richard Gleeson ‡	₹1 crore (US$100,000)	19 May 2025	
Corbin Bosch	Mumbai Indians	₹75 lakh (US$78,000)	National duty	20 May 2025	Charith Asalanka ‡	₹75 lakh (US$78,000)	20 May 2025	
Jacob Bethell	Royal Challengers Bengaluru	₹2.6 crore (US$270,000)	National duty	22 May 2025	Tim Seifert ‡	₹2 crore (US$210,000)	22 May 2025	
