= List of 2024 Indian Premier League personnel changes =

2024 Indian Premier League Auction

General information
- Sport: Cricket
- Date: 19 December 2023
- Time: 1:00 PM IST
- Location: Coca-Cola Arena, Dubai, UAE
- Networks: Star Sports (TV); JioCinema (Internet)

Overview
- League: Indian Premier League
- Teams: 10

This is a list of personnel changes which took place ahead of the 2024 Indian Premier League (IPL).

== Retirement ==
Date	Name	2023 team	Age	Ref
30 May 2023	Ambati Rayudu	Chennai Super Kings	38	

== Pre-auction ==
The Board of Control for Cricket in India set the deadline of 26 November 2023 5 pm IST for IPL teams to announce their lists of players to be retained and released before the auction.

=== Traded players ===
List of Traded players ahead of 2024 Auction
Player	Nationality	Salary	From	To	Date	Ref
Romario Shepherd	West Indies	₹50 lakh (US$52,000)	Lucknow Super Giants	Mumbai Indians	3 November 2023	
Avesh Khan	India	₹10 crore (US$1.0 million)	Lucknow Super Giants	Rajasthan Royals	22 November 2023	
Devdutt Padikkal	India	₹7.75 crore (US$800,000)	Rajasthan Royals	Lucknow Super Giants	22 November 2023	
Mayank Dagar	India	₹1.8 crore (US$190,000)	Sunrisers Hyderabad	Royal Challengers Bengaluru	25 November 2023	
Shahbaz Ahmed	India	₹2.4 crore (US$250,000)	Royal Challengers Bengaluru	Sunrisers Hyderabad	25 November 2023	
Hardik Pandya	India	₹15 crore (US$1.6 million)	Gujarat Titans	Mumbai Indians	26 November 2023	
Cameron Green	Australia	₹17.5 crore (US$1.8 million)	Mumbai Indians	Royal Challengers Bengaluru	26 November 2023	

=== Released players ===
List of Released players ahead of 2024 Auction

Chennai Super Kings
Player	Nationality	Salary
Ben Stokes	England	₹16.25 crore (US$1.7 million)
Kyle Jamieson	New Zealand	₹1 crore (US$100,000)
Dwaine Pretorius	South Africa	₹50 lakh (US$52,000)
Sisanda Magala	South Africa	₹50 lakh (US$52,000)
Subhranshu Senapati	India	₹20 lakh (US$21,000)
Akash Singh	India	₹20 lakh (US$21,000)
Bhagath Varma	India	₹20 lakh (US$21,000)

Delhi Capitals
Player	Nationality	Salary
Rilee Rossouw	South Africa	₹4.6 crore (US$480,000)
Chetan Sakariya	India	₹4.2 crore (US$440,000)
Rovman Powell	West Indies	₹2.8 crore (US$290,000)
Manish Pandey	India	₹2.4 crore (US$250,000)
Mustafizur Rahman	Bangladesh	₹2 crore (US$210,000)
Phil Salt	England	₹2 crore (US$210,000)
Kamlesh Nagarkoti	India	₹1.1 crore (US$110,000)
Aman Hakim Khan	India	₹20 lakh (US$21,000)
Ripal Patel	India	₹20 lakh (US$21,000)
Sarfaraz Khan	India	₹20 lakh (US$21,000)
Priyam Garg	India	₹20 lakh (US$21,000)

Gujarat Titans
Player	Nationality	Salary
Shivam Mavi	India	₹6 crore (US$620,000)
Yash Dayal	India	₹3.2 crore (US$330,000)
Alzarri Joseph	West Indies	₹2.4 crore (US$250,000)
KS Bharat	India	₹1.2 crore (US$120,000)
Dasun Shanaka	Sri Lanka	₹50 lakh (US$52,000)
Odean Smith	West Indies	₹50 lakh (US$52,000)
Pradeep Sangwan	India	₹20 lakh (US$21,000)
Urvil Patel	India	₹20 lakh (US$21,000)

Kolkata Knight Riders
Player	Nationality	Salary
Shardul Thakur	India	₹10.75 crore (US$1.1 million)
Lockie Ferguson	New Zealand	₹10 crore (US$1.0 million)
Umesh Yadav	India	₹2 crore (US$210,000)
Shakib Al Hasan	Bangladesh	₹1.5 crore (US$160,000)
Tim Southee	New Zealand	₹1.5 crore (US$160,000)
David Wiese	Namibia	₹1 crore (US$100,000)
Narayan Jagadeesan	India	₹90 lakh (US$93,000)
Johnson Charles	West Indies	₹50 lakh (US$52,000)
Mandeep Singh	India	₹50 lakh (US$52,000)
Litton Das	Bangladesh	₹50 lakh (US$52,000)
Aarya Desai	India	₹20 lakh (US$21,000)
Kulwant Khejroliya	India	₹20 lakh (US$21,000)

Lucknow Super Giants
Player	Nationality	Salary
Daniel Sams	Australia	₹75 lakh (US$78,000)
Jaydev Unadkat	India	₹50 lakh (US$52,000)
Karun Nair	India	₹50 lakh (US$52,000)
Arpit Guleria	India	₹20 lakh (US$21,000)
Karan Sharma	India	₹20 lakh (US$21,000)
Manan Vohra	India	₹20 lakh (US$21,000)
Swapnil Singh	India	₹20 lakh (US$21,000)
Suryansh Shedge	India	₹20 lakh (US$21,000)

Mumbai Indians
Player	Nationality	Salary
Jofra Archer	England	₹8 crore (US$830,000)
Chris Jordan	England	₹2 crore (US$210,000)
Jhye Richardson	Australia	₹1.5 crore (US$160,000)
Riley Meredith	Australia	₹1.5 crore (US$160,000)
Sandeep Warrier	India	₹50 lakh (US$52,000)
Arshad Khan	India	₹20 lakh (US$21,000)
Duan Jansen	South Africa	₹20 lakh (US$21,000)
Hrithik Shokeen	India	₹20 lakh (US$21,000)
Raghav Goyal	India	₹20 lakh (US$21,000)
Ramandeep Singh	India	₹20 lakh (US$21,000)
Tristan Stubbs	South Africa	₹20 lakh (US$21,000)

Punjab Kings
Player	Nationality	Salary
Shahrukh Khan	India	₹9 crore (US$930,000)
Raj Angad Bawa	India	₹2 crore (US$210,000)
Bhanuka Rajapaksa	Sri Lanka	₹50 lakh (US$52,000)
Matthew Short	Australia	₹50 lakh (US$52,000)
Baltej Singh	India	₹20 lakh (US$21,000)
Gurnoor Brar	India	₹20 lakh (US$21,000)
Mohit Rathee	India	₹20 lakh (US$21,000)

Rajasthan Royals
Player	Nationality	Salary
Jason Holder	West Indies	₹5.75 crore (US$600,000)
Joe Root	England	₹1 crore (US$100,000)
Obed McCoy	West Indies	₹75 lakh (US$78,000)
KM Asif	India	₹30 lakh (US$31,000)
KC Cariappa	India	₹30 lakh (US$31,000)
Murugan Ashwin	India	₹20 lakh (US$21,000)
Abdul Basith	India	₹20 lakh (US$21,000)
Akash Vashist	India	₹20 lakh (US$21,000)
Kuldip Yadav	India	₹20 lakh (US$21,000)

Royal Challengers Bengaluru
Player	Nationality	Salary
Wanindu Hasaranga	Sri Lanka	₹10.75 crore (US$1.1 million)
Harshal Patel	India	₹10.75 crore (US$1.1 million)
Josh Hazlewood	Australia	₹7.75 crore (US$800,000)
David Willey	England	₹2 crore (US$210,000)
Kedar Jadhav	India	₹1 crore (US$100,000)
Michael Bracewell	New Zealand	₹1 crore (US$100,000)
Finn Allen	New Zealand	₹80 lakh (US$83,000)
Siddharth Kaul	India	₹75 lakh (US$78,000)
Wayne Parnell	South Africa	₹75 lakh (US$78,000)
Avinash Singh	India	₹60 lakh (US$62,000)
Sonu Yadav	India	₹20 lakh (US$21,000)

Sunrisers Hyderabad
Player	Nationality	Salary
Harry Brook	England	₹13.25 crore (US$1.4 million)
Kartik Tyagi	India	₹4 crore (US$420,000)
Vivrant Sharma	India	₹2.6 crore (US$270,000)
Adil Rashid	England	₹2 crore (US$210,000)
Akeal Hosein	West Indies	₹1 crore (US$100,000)
Samarth Vyas	India	₹20 lakh (US$21,000)

=== Retained players ===
List of Retained players ahead of 2024 Auction

Chennai Super Kings
Player	Nationality	Salary
Ravindra Jadeja	India	₹16 crore (US$1.7 million)
Deepak Chahar	India	₹14 crore (US$1.5 million)
MS Dhoni	India	₹12 crore (US$1.2 million)
Moeen Ali	England	₹8 crore (US$830,000)
Ruturaj Gaikwad	India	₹6 crore (US$620,000)
Shivam Dube	India	₹4 crore (US$420,000)
Mitchell Santner	New Zealand	₹1.9 crore (US$200,000)
Rajvardhan Hangargekar	India	₹1.5 crore (US$160,000)
Prashant Solanki	India	₹1.2 crore (US$120,000)
Devon Conway	New Zealand	₹1 crore (US$100,000)
Maheesh Theekshana	Sri Lanka	₹70 lakh (US$73,000)
Nishant Sindhu	India	₹60 lakh (US$62,000)
Ajinkya Rahane	India	₹50 lakh (US$52,000)
Ajay Mandal	India	₹20 lakh (US$21,000)
Matheesha Pathirana	Sri Lanka	₹20 lakh (US$21,000)
Mukesh Choudhary	India	₹20 lakh (US$21,000)
Shaik Rasheed	India	₹20 lakh (US$21,000)
Simarjeet Singh	India	₹20 lakh (US$21,000)
Tushar Deshpande	India	₹20 lakh (US$21,000)

Delhi Capitals
Player	Nationality	Salary
Rishabh Pant	India	₹16 crore (US$1.7 million)
Axar Patel	India	₹12 crore (US$1.2 million)
Prithvi Shaw	India	₹8 crore (US$830,000)
Anrich Nortje	South Africa	₹6.5 crore (US$670,000)
Mitchell Marsh	Australia	₹6.5 crore (US$670,000)
David Warner	Australia	₹6.25 crore (US$650,000)
Mukesh Kumar	India	₹5.50 crore (US$570,000)
Khaleel Ahmed	India	₹5.25 crore (US$550,000)
Kuldeep Yadav	India	₹2 crore (US$210,000)
Lalit Yadav	India	₹65 lakh (US$67,000)
Pravin Dubey	India	₹50 lakh (US$52,000)
Lungi Ngidi	South Africa	₹50 lakh (US$52,000)
Yash Dhull	India	₹50 lakh (US$52,000)
Ishant Sharma	India	₹50 lakh (US$52,000)
Vicky Ostwal	India	₹20 lakh (US$21,000)
Abishek Porel	India	₹20 lakh (US$21,000)

Gujarat Titans
Player	Nationality	Salary
Rashid Khan	Afghanistan	₹15 crore (US$1.6 million)
Rahul Tewatia	India	₹9 crore (US$930,000)
Shubman Gill	India	₹7 crore (US$730,000)
Mohammed Shami	India	₹6.25 crore (US$650,000)
Josh Little	Ireland	₹4.4 crore (US$460,000)
David Miller	South Africa	₹3 crore (US$310,000)
R Sai Kishore	India	₹3 crore (US$310,000)
Abhinav Manohar	India	₹2.6 crore (US$270,000)
Matthew Wade	Australia	₹2.4 crore (US$250,000)
Kane Williamson	New Zealand	₹2 crore (US$210,000)
Wriddhiman Saha	India	₹1.9 crore (US$200,000)
Jayant Yadav	India	₹1.7 crore (US$180,000)
Vijay Shankar	India	₹1.4 crore (US$150,000)
Mohit Sharma	India	₹50 lakh (US$52,000)
Noor Ahmad	Afghanistan	₹30 lakh (US$31,000)
Darshan Nalkande	India	₹20 lakh (US$21,000)
Sai Sudarshan	India	₹20 lakh (US$21,000)

Kolkata Knight Riders
Player	Nationality	Salary
Andre Russell	West Indies	₹14 crore (US$1.5 million)
Shreyas Iyer	India	₹12.25 crore (US$1.3 million)
Varun Chakaravarthy	India	₹12 crore (US$1.2 million)
Venkatesh Iyer	India	₹8 crore (US$830,000)
Nitish Rana	India	₹8 crore (US$830,000)
Sunil Narine	West Indies	₹6 crore (US$620,000)
Harshit Rana	India	₹2 crore (US$210,000)
Jason Roy	England	₹1.5 crore (US$160,000)
Vaibhav Arora	India	₹60 lakh (US$62,000)
Rinku Singh	India	₹55 lakh (US$57,000)
Rahmanullah Gurbaz	Afghanistan	₹50 lakh (US$52,000)
Anukul Roy	India	₹20 lakh (US$21,000)
Suyash Sharma	India	₹20 lakh (US$21,000)

Lucknow Super Giants
Player	Nationality	Salary
KL Rahul	India	₹17 crore (US$1.8 million)
Nicholas Pooran	West Indies	₹16 crore (US$1.7 million)
Marcus Stoinis	Australia	₹11 crore (US$1.1 million)
Krunal Pandya	India	₹8.25 crore (US$860,000)
Devdutt Padikkal	India	₹7.75 lakh (US$8,000)
Mark Wood	England	₹7.5 crore (US$780,000)
Quinton de Kock	South Africa	₹6.75 crore (US$700,000)
Deepak Hooda	India	₹5.75 crore (US$600,000)
Ravi Bishnoi	India	₹4 crore (US$420,000)
Krishnappa Gowtham	India	₹90 lakh (US$93,000)
Kyle Mayers	West Indies	₹50 lakh (US$52,000)
Amit Mishra	India	₹50 lakh (US$52,000)
Naveen-ul-Haq	Afghanistan	₹50 lakh (US$52,000)
Yash Thakur	India	₹45 lakh (US$47,000)
Mayank Yadav	India	₹20 lakh (US$21,000)
Ayush Badoni	India	₹20 lakh (US$21,000)
Yudhvir Singh	India	₹20 lakh (US$21,000)
Prerak Mankad	India	₹20 lakh (US$21,000)
Mohsin Khan	India	₹20 lakh (US$21,000)

Mumbai Indians
Player	Nationality	Salary
Rohit Sharma	India	₹16 crore (US$1.7 million)
Ishan Kishan	India	₹15.25 crore (US$1.6 million)
Hardik Pandya	India	₹15 crore (US$1.6 million)
Jasprit Bumrah	India	₹12 crore (US$1.2 million)
Tim David	Australia	₹8.25 crore (US$860,000)
Suryakumar Yadav	India	₹8 crore (US$830,000)
Dewald Brevis	South Africa	₹3 crore (US$310,000)
Tilak Varma	India	₹1.7 crore (US$180,000)
Jason Behrendorff	Australia	₹75 lakh (US$78,000)
Piyush Chawla	India	₹50 lakh (US$52,000)
Romario Shepherd	West Indies	₹50 lakh (US$52,000)
Arjun Tendulkar	India	₹30 lakh (US$31,000)
Akash Madhwal	India	₹20 lakh (US$21,000)
Kumar Kartikeya	India	₹20 lakh (US$21,000)
Nehal Wadhera	India	₹20 lakh (US$21,000)
Shams Mulani	India	₹20 lakh (US$21,000)
Vishnu Vinod	India	₹20 lakh (US$21,000)

Punjab Kings
Player	Nationality	Salary
Sam Curran	England	₹18.5 crore (US$1.9 million)
Liam Livingstone	England	₹11.5 crore (US$1.2 million)
Kagiso Rabada	South Africa	₹9.25 crore (US$960,000)
Shikhar Dhawan	India	₹8.25 crore (US$860,000)
Jonny Bairstow	England	₹6.75 crore (US$700,000)
Rahul Chahar	India	₹5.25 crore (US$550,000)
Arshdeep Singh	India	₹4 crore (US$420,000)
Harpreet Brar	India	₹3.80 crore (US$390,000)
Nathan Ellis	Australia	₹75 lakh (US$78,000)
Prabhsimran Singh	India	₹60 lakh (US$62,000)
Rishi Dhawan	India	₹55 lakh (US$57,000)
Sikandar Raza	Zimbabwe	₹50 lakh (US$52,000)
Harpreet Singh Bhatia	India	₹40 lakh (US$42,000)
Atharva Taide	India	₹20 lakh (US$21,000)
Jitesh Sharma	India	₹20 lakh (US$21,000)
Shivam Singh	India	₹20 lakh (US$21,000)
Vidwath Kaverappa	India	₹20 lakh (US$21,000)

Rajasthan Royals
Player	Nationality	Salary
Sanju Samson	India	₹14 crore (US$1.5 million)
Avesh Khan	India	₹10 crore (US$1.0 million)
Jos Buttler	England	₹10 crore (US$1.0 million)
Prasidh Krishna	India	₹10 crore (US$1.0 million)
Shimron Hetmyer	West Indies	₹8.5 crore (US$880,000)
Trent Boult	New Zealand	₹8 crore (US$830,000)
Yuzvendra Chahal	India	₹6.5 crore (US$670,000)
Ravichandran Ashwin	India	₹5 crore (US$520,000)
Yashasvi Jaiswal	India	₹4 crore (US$420,000)
Riyan Parag	India	₹3.80 crore (US$390,000)
Navdeep Saini	India	₹2.60 crore (US$270,000)
Adam Zampa	Australia	₹1.5 crore (US$160,000)
Donovan Ferreira	South Africa	₹50 lakh (US$52,000)
Sandeep Sharma	India	₹50 lakh (US$52,000)
Dhruv Jurel	India	₹20 lakh (US$21,000)
Kuldeep Sen	India	₹20 lakh (US$21,000)
Kunal Singh Rathore	India	₹20 lakh (US$21,000)

Royal Challengers Bengaluru
Player	Nationality	Salary
Cameron Green	Australia	₹17.5 crore (US$1.8 million)
Virat Kohli	India	₹15 crore (US$1.6 million)
Glenn Maxwell	Australia	₹11 crore (US$1.1 million)
Faf du Plessis	South Africa	₹7 crore (US$730,000)
Mohammed Siraj	India	₹7 crore (US$730,000)
Dinesh Karthik	India	₹5.5 crore (US$570,000)
Anuj Rawat	India	₹3.4 crore (US$350,000)
Will Jacks	England	₹3.2 crore (US$330,000)
Reece Topley	England	₹1.9 crore (US$200,000)
Mayank Dagar	India	₹1.8 crore (US$190,000)
Mahipal Lomror	India	₹95 lakh (US$99,000)
Rajan Kumar	India	₹70 lakh (US$73,000)
Karn Sharma	India	₹50 lakh (US$52,000)
Suyash Prabhudessai	India	₹30 lakh (US$31,000)
Akash Deep	India	₹20 lakh (US$21,000)
Himanshu Sharma	India	₹20 lakh (US$21,000)
Manoj Bhandage	India	₹20 lakh (US$21,000)
Rajat Patidar	India	₹20 lakh (US$21,000)
Vijaykumar Vyshak	India	₹20 lakh (US$21,000)

Sunrisers Hyderabad
Player	Nationality	Salary
Washington Sundar	India	₹8.75 crore (US$910,000)
Rahul Tripathi	India	₹8.5 crore (US$880,000)
Mayank Agarwal	India	₹8.25 crore (US$860,000)
Abhishek Sharma	India	₹6.5 crore (US$670,000)
Heinrich Klaasen	South Africa	₹5.25 crore (US$550,000)
Bhuvneshwar Kumar	India	₹4.2 crore (US$440,000)
Marco Jansen	South Africa	₹4.2 crore (US$440,000)
Abdul Samad	India	₹4 crore (US$420,000)
T Natarajan	India	₹4 crore (US$420,000)
Umran Malik	India	₹4 crore (US$420,000)
Aiden Markram	South Africa	₹2.6 crore (US$270,000)
Shahbaz Ahmed	India	₹2.4 crore (US$250,000)
Glenn Phillips	New Zealand	₹1.5 crore (US$160,000)
Fazalhaq Farooqi	Afghanistan	₹50 lakh (US$52,000)
Mayank Markande	India	₹50 lakh (US$52,000)
Upendra Yadav	India	₹25 lakh (US$26,000)
Anmolpreet Singh	India	₹20 lakh (US$21,000)
Nitish Kumar Reddy	India	₹20 lakh (US$21,000)
Sanvir Singh	India	₹20 lakh (US$21,000)

=== Purse remaining ===
Purse remaining ahead of 2024 Auction
Team	Purse available	Slots left
Chennai Super Kings	₹31.40 crore (US$3.3 million)	6 (3 overseas)
Delhi Capitals	₹28.95 crore (US$3.0 million)	9 (4 overseas)
Gujarat Titans	₹38.15 crore (US$4.0 million)	8 (2 overseas)
Lucknow Super Giants	₹13.15 crore (US$1.4 million)	6 (2 overseas)
Kolkata Knight Riders	₹32.70 crore (US$3.4 million)	12 (4 overseas)
Mumbai Indians	₹17.75 crore (US$1.8 million)	8 (4 overseas)
Punjab Kings	₹29.10 crore (US$3.0 million)	8 (2 overseas)
Rajasthan Royals	₹14.50 crore (US$1.5 million)	8 (3 overseas)
Royal Challengers Bengaluru	₹23.25 crore (US$2.4 million)	6 (3 overseas)
Sunrisers Hyderabad	₹34 crore (US$3.5 million)	6 (3 overseas)

== Auction ==
The IPL 2024 auction was conducted on 19 December 2023 in Dubai. A total of 333 players were available for auction including 214 Indian and 119 foreign players. 77 places were available to be filled across the ten teams including 30 overseas slots. Mitchell Starc became the most expensive player in IPL auction's history when he was bought at 24.75 crore by Kolkata Knight Riders, surpassing Pat Cummins who was bought for 20.50 crore by Sunrisers Hyderabad in the same auction. Pat Cummins had surpassed Sam Curran's record of 18.50 crore in 2023 auction. On the other hand, prominent players like Steve Smith, Michael Bracewell, Josh Hazlewood and Josh Inglis went unsold.

Mallika Sagar was announced as the auctioneer for the hosting of the auction and she replaced Hugh Edmeades for the role as Edmeades stepped aside from hosting the auction due to health issues. Mallika Sagar became the first female auctioneer in the Indian Premier League during the process.

=== Sold players ===
S.No.	Set No.	Set	Name	Country	Playing Role	IPL Matches	Capped / Uncapped / Associate	Base Price (in ₹ Lacs)	IPL 2024 Team	Auctioned Price (in ₹ Lacs)	IPL 2023 Team	Previous IPL Team(s)
Set 1: Capped Batters
1	1	BA1	Harry Brook	(England)	Batsman	11	Capped	200	Delhi Capitals	400	Sunrisers Hyderabad	—N/a
2	1	BA1	Travis Head	(Australia)	Batsman	10	Capped	200	Sunrisers Hyderabad	680	—N/a	Royal Challengers Bengaluru
5	1	BA1	Rovman Powell	(Cricket West Indies)	Batsman	17	Capped	100	Rajasthan Royals	740	Delhi Capitals	Kolkata Knight Riders
Set 2: Capped All-Rounders
10	2	AL1	Wanindu Hasaranga	Sri Lanka	All-rounder	26	Capped	150	Sunrisers Hyderabad	150	Royal Challengers Bengaluru	—N/a
14	2	AL1	Rachin Ravindra	New Zealand	All-rounder	0	Capped	50	Chennai Super Kings	180	—N/a	—N/a
15	2	AL1	Shardul Thakur	India	All-rounder	86	Capped	200	Chennai Super Kings	400	Kolkata Knight Riders	Kings XI Punjab; Rising Pune Supergiants; Delhi Capitals
12	2	AL1	Azmatullah Omarzai	Afghanistan	All-rounder	0	Capped	50	Gujarat Titans	50	—N/a	—N/a
9	2	AL1	Pat Cummins	Australia	All-rounder	42	Capped	200	Sunrisers Hyderabad	2050	—N/a	Kolkata Knight Riders; Delhi Daredevils
8	2	AL1	Gerald Coetzee	South Africa	All-rounder	0	Capped	200	Mumbai Indians	500	—N/a	—N/a
13	2	AL1	Harshal Patel	India	All-rounder	92	Capped	200	Punjab Kings	1175	Royal Challengers Bengaluru	Delhi Daredevils
11	2	AL1	Daryl Mitchell	New Zealand	All-rounder	2	Capped	100	Chennai Super Kings	1400	—N/a	Rajasthan Royals
16	2	AL1	Chris Woakes	England	All-rounder	21	Capped	200	Punjab Kings	420	—N/a	Kolkata Knight Riders; Royal Challengers Bengaluru; Delhi Capitals
Set 3: Capped Wicket-Keepers
21	3	WK1	Tristan Stubbs	South Africa	Wicket-Keeper	4	Capped	50	Delhi Capitals	50	—N/a	—N/a
17	3	WK1	K. S. Bharat	India	Wicket-Keeper	10	Capped	50	Kolkata Knight Riders	50	Gujarat Titans	Royal Challengers Bengaluru; Delhi Capitals
Set 4: Capped Fast Bowlers
27	4	FA1	Chetan Sakariya	India	Bowler	19	Capped	50	Kolkata Knight Riders	50	—N/a	—N/a
24	4	FA1	Alzarri Joseph	West Indies	Bowler	19	Capped	100	Royal Challengers Bengaluru	1150	—N/a	—N/a
30	4	FA1	Umesh Yadav	India	Bowler	141	Capped	200	Gujarat Titans	580	Kolkata Knight Riders	—N/a
26	4	FA1	Shivam Mavi	India	Bowler	32	Capped	50	Lucknow Super Giants	640	—N/a	—N/a
28	4	FA1	Mitchell Starc	Australia	Bowler	27	Capped	200	Kolkata Knight Riders	2475	—N/a	—N/a
29	4	FA1	Jaydev Unadkat	India	Bowler	94	Capped	50	Sunrisers Hyderabad	160	—N/a	—N/a
25	4	FA1	Dilshan Madushanka	Sri Lanka	Bowler		Capped	50	Mumbai Indians	460	—N/a	—N/a
Set 6: Uncapped Batters
39	6	UBA1	Shubham Dubey	India	Batsman		Uncapped	20	Rajasthan Royals	580	—N/a	—N/a
42	6	UBA1	Sameer Rizvi	India	Batsman		Uncapped	20	Chennai Super Kings	840	—N/a	—N/a
40	6	UBA1	Angkrish Raghuvanshi	India	Batsman		Uncapped	20	Kolkata Knight Riders	20	—N/a	—N/a
Set 7: Uncapped All-Ronders
48	7	UAL1	Arshin Kulkarni	India	All-rounder		Uncapped	20	Lucknow Super Giants	20	—N/a	—N/a
45	7	UAL1	Shahrukh Khan	India	All-rounder	33	Uncapped	20	Gujarat Titans	740	—N/a	—N/a
52	7	UAL1	Ramandeep Singh	India	All-rounder	5	Uncapped	20	Kolkata Knight Riders	20	Mumbai Indians	—N/a
Set 8: Uncapped Wicket-Keepers
54	8	UWK1	Tom Kohler-Cadmore	England	Wicket-Keeper		Uncapped	40	Rajasthan Royals	40	—N/a	—N/a
53	8	UWK1	Ricky Bhui	India	Wicket-Keeper	2	Uncapped	20	Delhi Capitals	20	—N/a	Sunrisers Hyderabad
55	8	UWK1	Kumar Kushagra	India	Wicket-Keeper		Uncapped	20	Delhi Capitals	720	—N/a	—N/a
Set 9: Uncapped Fast Bowlers
59	9	UFA1	Yash Dayal	India	Bowler	14	Uncapped	20	Royal Challengers Bengaluru	500	Gujarat Titans	—N/a
60	9	UFA1	Sushant Mishra	India	Bowler		Uncapped	20	Gujarat Titans	220	—N/a	—N/a
63	9	UFA1	Kartik Tyagi	India	Bowler	19	Uncapped	20	Gujarat Titans	500	Sunrisers Hyderabad	Rajasthan Royals
58	9	UFA1	Rasikh Dar	India	Bowler	3	Uncapped	20	Delhi Capitals	20	—N/a	Mumbai Indians; Kolkata Knight Riders
62	9	UFA1	Akash Singh	India	Bowler	7	Uncapped	20	Sunrisers Hyderabad	20	Chennai Super Kings	Rajasthan Royals
Set 10: Uncapped Spinners
70	10	USP1	Manav Suthar	India	Bowler		Uncapped	20	Gujarat Titans	20	—N/a	—N/a
68	10	USP1	Manimaran Siddharth	India	Bowler		Uncapped	20	Lucknow Super Giants	240	—N/a	—N/a
66	10	USP1	Shreyas Gopal	India	Bowler	49	Uncapped	20	Mumbai Indians	20	—N/a	Rajasthan Royals; Sunrisers Hyderabad
Accelerated Round 1
78	^{[ACC-1]}		Sherfane Rutherford	West Indies	Batsman	10	Capped	150	Kolkata Knight Riders	150	—N/a	Delhi Capitals; Mumbai Indians; Rajasthan Royals; Royal Challengers Bengaluru
79	^{[ACC-1]}		Ashton Turner	Australia	Batsman	4	Capped	100	Lucknow Super Giants	100	—N/a	Rajasthan Royals
93	^{[ACC-1]}		Tom Curran	England	All-Rounder	13	Capped	150	Royal Challengers Bengaluru	150	—N/a	Kolkata Knight Riders; Rajasthan Royals; Delhi Capitals
111	^{[ACC-1]}		David Willey	England	All-Rounder	11	Capped	200	Lucknow Super Giants	200	Royal Challengers Bengaluru	Chennai Super Kings
126	^{[ACC-1]}		Spencer Johnson	Australia	Bowler		Capped	50	Gujarat Titans	1000	—N/a	—N/a
138	^{[ACC-1]}		Mustafizur Rahman	Bangladesh	Bowler	48	Capped	200	Chennai Super Kings	200	Delhi Capitals	Sunrisers Hyderabad; Mumbai Indians; Rajasthan Royals
139	^{[ACC-1]}		Jhye Richardson	Australia	Bowler	3	Capped	150	Delhi Capitals	500	—N/a	Punjab Kings; Mumbai Indians
147	^{[ACC-1]}		Nuwan Thushara	Sri Lanka	Bowler		Capped	50	Mumbai Indians	480	—N/a	—N/a
191	^{[ACC-1]}		Naman Dhir	India	All-Rounder		Uncapped	20	Mumbai Indians	20	—N/a	—N/a
200	^{[ACC-1]}		Anshul Kamboj	India	All-Rounder		Uncapped	20	Mumbai Indians	20	—N/a	—N/a
205	^{[ACC-1]}		Sumit Kumar	India	All-Rounder		Uncapped	20	Delhi Capitals	100	—N/a	—N/a
231	^{[ACC-1]}		Ashutosh Sharma	India	All-Rounder		Uncapped	20	Punjab Kings	20	—N/a	—N/a
236	^{[ACC-1]}		Vishwanath Singh	India	All-Rounder		Uncapped	20	Punjab Kings	20	—N/a	—N/a
237	^{[ACC-1]}		Shashank Singh	India	All-Rounder	10	Uncapped	20	Punjab Kings	20	—N/a	Delhi Capitals; Rajasthan Royals; Sunrisers Hyderabad
241	^{[ACC-1]}		Tanay Thyagarajan	India	All-Rounder		Uncapped	20	Punjab Kings	20	—N/a	—N/a
255	^{[ACC-1]}		Robin Minz	India	Wicket-Keeper		Uncapped	20	Gujarat Titans	360	—N/a	—N/a
317	^{[ACC-1]}		Prince Choudary	India	Bowler		Uncapped	20	Punjab Kings	20	—N/a	—N/a
330	^{[ACC-1]}		Jhathavedh Subramanyan	India	Bowler		Uncapped	20	Sunrisers Hyderabad	20	—N/a	—N/a
Accelerated Round 2
4	^{[ACC-2]}		Manish Pandey	India	Batsman	170	Capped	50	Kolkata Knight Riders	50	Delhi Capitals	Mumbai Indians; Royal Challengers Bengaluru; Pune Warriors India; Sunrisers Hyderabad; Lucknow Super Giants
6	^{[ACC-2]}		Rilee Rossouw	South Africa	Batsman	14	Capped	200	Punjab Kings	800	Delhi Capitals	Royal Challengers Bengaluru
22	^{[ACC-2]}		Lockie Ferguson	New Zealand	Bowler	38	Capped	200	Royal Challengers Bengaluru	200	Kolkata Knight Riders	Rising Pune Supergiants; Gujarat Titans
32	^{[ACC-2]}		Mujeeb Ur Rahman	Afghanistan	Bowler	19	Capped	200	Kolkata Knight Riders	200	—N/a	Kings XI Punjab; Sunrisers Hyderabad
46	^{[ACC-2]}		Arshad Khan	India	All-Rounder	6	Uncapped	20	Lucknow Super Giants	20	Mumbai Indians	—N/a
101	^{[ACC-2]}		Mohammad Nabi	Afghanistan	All-Rounder	17	Capped	150	Mumbai Indians	150	—N/a	Sunrisers Hyderabad; Kolkata Knight Riders
115	^{[ACC-2]}		Shai Hope	West Indies	Wicket-Keeper		Capped	75	Delhi Capitals	75	—N/a	—N/a
119	^{[ACC-2]}		Gus Atkinson	England	Bowler		Capped	100	Kolkata Knight Riders	100	—N/a	—N/a
152	^{[ACC-2]}		Swastik Chhikara	India	Batsman		Uncapped	20	Delhi Capitals	20	—N/a	—N/a
213	^{[ACC-2]}		Abid Mushtaq	India	All-Rounder		Uncapped	20	Rajasthan Royals	20	—N/a	—N/a
232	^{[ACC-2]}		Shivalik Sharma	India	All-Rounder		Uncapped	20	Mumbai Indians	20	—N/a	—N/a
238	^{[ACC-2]}		Swapnil Singh	India	All-Rounder	7	Uncapped	20	Royal Challengers Bengaluru	20	Lucknow Super Giants	Kings XI Punjab
246	^{[ACC-2]}		Avanish Rao Aravelly	India	Wicket-Keeper		Uncapped	20	Chennai Super Kings	20	—N/a	—N/a
275	^{[ACC-2]}		Nandre Burger	South Africa	Bowler		Capped	50	Rajasthan Royals	50	—N/a	—N/a
282	^{[ACC-2]}		Sakib Hussain	India	Bowler		Uncapped	20	Kolkata Knight Riders	20	—N/a	—N/a
38	^{[ACC-2]}		Saurav Chauhan	India	Batsman		Uncapped	20	Royal Challengers Bengaluru	20	—N/a	—N/a

^{ACC} ACC-1/2: Players who were part of accelerated bidding.

== Support staff changes ==
Support staff changes ahead of 2024 IPL
Team	Name	Change	Role	Notes	Ref
Delhi Capitals	Ajit Agarkar	Resigned	Assistant coach	Chairman of the BCCI selection committee	
Delhi Capitals	Shane Watson	Sacked	Assistant coach	—N/a	
Kolkata Knight Riders	Gautam Gambhir	Appointed	Mentor	—N/a	
Lucknow Super Giants	Andy Flower	Sacked	Head coach	Replaced by Justin Langer	
Lucknow Super Giants	Justin Langer	Appointed	Head coach	Replaced Andy Flower	
Lucknow Super Giants	Sridharan Sriram	Appointed	Assistant coach	—N/a	
Lucknow Super Giants	Gautam Gambhir	Resigned	Mentor	—N/a	
Lucknow Super Giants	Lance Klusener	Appointed	Assistant coach	—N/a	
Lucknow Super Giants	Adam Voges	Appointed	Consultant	—N/a	
Mumbai Indians	Shane Bond	Resigned	Bowling coach	Replaced by Lasith Malinga	
Mumbai Indians	Lasith Malinga	Appointed	Bowling coach	Replaced Shane Bond	
Punjab Kings	Sanjay Bangar	Appointed	Head of Cricket Development	—N/a	
	Wasim Jaffer	Resigned	Batting Coach	—N/a	
Rajasthan Royals	Lasith Malinga	Resigned	Fast bowling coach	Replaced by Shane Bond	
Rajasthan Royals	Shane Bond	Appointed	Fast bowling coach	Replaced Lasith Malinga	
Royal Challengers Bengaluru	Sanjay Bangar	Sacked	Head coach	Replaced by Andy Flower	
Royal Challengers Bengaluru	Mike Hesson	Sacked	Director of Cricket Operations	Replaced by Mo Bobat	
Royal Challengers Bengaluru	Andy Flower	Appointed	Head coach	Replaced Sanjay Bangar	
Royal Challengers Bengaluru	Mo Bobat	Appointed	Director of Cricket Operations	Replaced Mike Hesson	
Royal Challengers Bengaluru	Sridharan Sriram	Resigned	Batting and spin bowling coach	—N/a	
Sunrisers Hyderabad	Brian Lara	Sacked	Head coach	Replaced by Daniel Vettori	
Sunrisers Hyderabad	Daniel Vettori	Appointed	Head coach	Replaced Brian Lara	
Sunrisers Hyderabad	Dale Steyn	Resigned	Bowling coach	Replaced by James Franklin	
Sunrisers Hyderabad	James Franklin	Appointed	Bowling coach	Replaced Dale Steyn	

== Withdrawn players ==
Withdrawn players in 2024 IPL
Player	Nationality	Team	Auctioned/retention price	Reason	Withdrawal announcement date	Replacement player	Nationality	Replacement player's price	Replacement player's base price	Signing date	Ref.
Mark Wood	England	Lucknow Super Giants	₹7.5 crore (US$780,000)	Workload management	10 February 2024	Shamar Joseph	West Indies	₹3 crore (US$310,000)	₹20 lakh (US$21,000)	10 February 2024	
Gus Atkinson	England	Kolkata Knight Riders	₹1 crore (US$100,000)	Workload management	19 February 2024	Dushmantha Chameera	Sri Lanka	₹50 lakh (US$52,000)		19 February 2024	
Mohammed Shami	India	Gujarat Titans	₹6.25 crore (US$650,000)	Achilles Tendon surgery	1 March 2024	Sandeep Warrier	India	₹50 lakh (US$52,000)		20 March 2024	
Jason Roy	England	Kolkata Knight Riders	₹2.8 crore (US$290,000)	Personal reasons	10 March 2024	Phil Salt	England	₹1.5 crore (US$160,000)		10 March 2024	
Prasidh Krishna	India	Rajasthan Royals	₹10 crore (US$1.0 million)	Left Proximal Quadriceps Tendon surgery	12 March 2024	Keshav Maharaj	South Africa	₹50 lakh (US$52,000)		28 March 2024	
Harry Brook	England	Delhi Capitals	₹4 crore (US$420,000)	Personal reasons	13 March 2024	Lizaad Williams	South Africa	₹50 lakh (US$52,000)		7 April 2024	
Lungi Ngidi	South Africa	Delhi Capitals	₹50 lakh (US$52,000)	Lower Back Injury	15 March 2024	Jake Fraser-McGurk	Australia	₹50 lakh (US$52,000)	₹20 lakh (US$21,000)	15 March 2024	
Jason Behrendorff	Australia	Mumbai Indians	₹75 lakh (US$78,000)	Injury	18 March 2024	Luke Wood	England	₹50 lakh (US$52,000)	₹50 lakh (US$52,000)	18 March 2024	
Dilshan Madushanka	Sri Lanka	Mumbai Indians	₹4.60 crore (US$480,000)	Injury	20 March 2024	Kwena Maphaka	South Africa	₹50 lakh (US$52,000)	₹20 lakh (US$21,000)	20 March 2024	
Adam Zampa	Australia	Rajasthan Royals	₹1.50 crore (US$160,000)	Personal reasons	21 March 2024	Tanush Kotian	India	₹20 lakh (US$21,000)		22 March 2024	
Robin Minz	India	Gujarat Titans	₹3.60 crore (US$370,000)	Injury	22 March 2024	BR Sharath	India	₹20 lakh (US$21,000)		22 March 2024	
Mujeeb Ur Rahman	Afghanistan	Kolkata Knight Riders	₹2 crore (US$210,000)	Injury	28 March 2024	Allah Ghazanfar	Afghanistan	₹20 lakh (US$21,000)		28 March 2024	
David Willey	England	Lucknow Super Giants	₹2 crore (US$210,000)	Personal Reasons	30 March 2024	Matt Henry	New Zealand	₹1.25 crore (US$130,000)	₹75 lakh (US$78,000)	30 March 2024	
Shivam Mavi	India	Lucknow Super Giants	₹6.4 crore (US$660,000)	Injury	3 April 2024	—N/a					
Wanindu Hasaranga	Sri Lanka	Sunrisers Hyderabad	₹1.5 crore (US$160,000)	Injury	6 April 2024	Vijayakanth Viyaskanth	Sri Lanka	₹50 lakh (US$52,000)		9 April 2024	
Vishnu Vinod	India	Mumbai Indians	₹20 lakh (US$21,000)	Forearm Injury	11 April 2024	Harvik Desai	India	₹20 lakh (US$21,000)		11 April 2024	
Devon Conway	New Zealand	Chennai Super Kings	₹1 crore (US$100,000)	Thumb Injury	18 April 2024	Richard Gleeson	England	₹50 lakh (US$52,000)		18 April 2024	
Mitchell Marsh	Australia	Delhi Capitals	₹6.5 crore (US$670,000)	Injury	25 April 2024	Gulbadin Naib	Afghanistan	₹50 lakh (US$52,000)		25 April 2024	
Sikandar Raza	Zimbabwe	Punjab Kings	₹50 lakh (US$52,000)	National Duty	27 April 2024	—N/a					
Mustafizur Rahman	Bangladesh	Chennai Super Kings	₹2 crore (US$210,000)	National Duty	1 May 2024	—N/a					
Deepak Chahar	India	Chennai Super Kings	₹14 crore (US$1.5 million)	Injury	4 May 2024	—N/a					
Mayank Yadav	India	Lucknow Super Giants	₹20 lakh (US$21,000)	Injury	4 May 2024	—N/a					
Matheesha Pathirana	Sri Lanka	Chennai Super Kings	₹20 lakh (US$21,000)	Jolt Injury	5 May 2024	—N/a					
Sushant Mishra	India	Gujarat Titans	₹2.2 crore (US$230,000)	Injury	11 May 2024	Gurnoor Brar	India	₹20 lakh (US$21,000)		11 May 2024	
Liam Livingstone	England	Punjab Kings	₹11.5 crore (US$1.2 million)	National Duty	13 May 2024	—N/a					
Jos Buttler	England	Rajasthan Royals	₹10 crore (US$1.0 million)	National Duty	13 May 2024	—N/a					
Will Jacks	England	Royal Challengers Bengaluru	₹3.2 crore (US$330,000)	National Duty	13 May 2024	—N/a					
Reece Topley	England	Royal Challengers Bengaluru	₹1.9 crore (US$200,000)	National Duty	13 May 2024	—N/a					
Phil Salt	England	Kolkata Knight Riders	₹1.5 crore (US$160,000)	National Duty	14 May 2024	—N/a					
Kagiso Rabada	South Africa	Punjab Kings	₹9.25 crore (US$960,000)	Injury	14 May 2024	—N/a					
Shikhar Dhawan	India	Punjab Kings	₹8.25 crore (US$860,000)	Injury	14 May 2024	—N/a					
Sam Curran	England	Punjab Kings	₹18.5 crore (US$1.9 million)	National Duty	18 May 2024	—N/a					
Jonny Bairstow	England	Punjab Kings	₹6.75 crore (US$700,000)	National Duty	18 May 2024	—N/a					
Moeen Ali	England	Chennai Super Kings	₹8 crore (US$830,000)	National Duty	18 May 2024	—N/a					
