= Urvil Patel =

Indian cricketer (born 1998)

Personal information
- Full name: Urvil Mukesh Patel
- Born: 17 October 1998 (age 28); Mehsana, Gujarat, India
- Batting: Right handed
- Role: Wicket keeper batter

Domestic team information
- Years: Team
- 2016-17: Baroda
- 2018-: Gujarat
- 2025-: Chennai Super Kings (squad no. 27)

Career statistics
Competition	FC	LA	T20
Matches	16	29	62
Runs scored	837	942	1,541
Batting average	32.19	39.25	26.56
100s/50s	2/4	3/3	3/5
Top score	140	116	119*
Catches/stumpings	38/5	33/4	48/7
- Source: Cricinfo, 18 May 2026

Urvil Mukesh Patel (born 17 October 1998) is an Indian cricketer who plays for Gujarat in domestic cricket and Chennai Super Kings in the Indian Premier League. He is a right-handed batter and wicket keeper.

== Early life ==
Urvil Mukesh Patel was born on 17 October 1998 in Mehsana, Gujarat.

== Domestic career ==
Patel made his Twenty20 debut for Baroda in the 2017–18 Zonal T20 League on 7 January 2018. He subsequently made his List A debut for Baroda in the 2017–18 Vijay Hazare Trophy on 7 February 2018. Ahead of the 2018–19 domestic season, he transferred from Baroda to Gujarat. He made his first class debut for Gujarat against Tamil Nadu in January 2024. On 27 November 2023, he scored the second fastest century in List A cricket by an Indian batter, reaching the landmark in 41 balls. On 27 November 2024, he scored the fastest century in the history of Syed Mushtaq Ali Trophy against Tripura.

== IPL career ==
Patel was picked up by Gujarat Titans in the auction ahead of the 2023 season of the Indian Premier League (IPL) for his base price of ₹2 million (US$21,000). However, he did not play a game for the Titans, and was released in November 2023 ahead of the auction for the 2024 IPL season. After getting unsold in the auction for the 2025 season of the IPL held in November 2025, he was signed by the Chennai Super Kings as a replacement for Vansh Bedi who was ruled out of the season due to injury. He was signed by the Super Kings for his base price of ₹3 million (US$32,000). He made his debut for the Super Kings on 7 May 2025, against the Kolkata Knight Riders, and scored 31 runs off 11 balls. The following year, he rose to prominence after scoring the joint-fastest IPL fifty in 13 balls against the Lucknow Super Giants, finishing on 65 from 23 balls with 2 fours and 8 sixes at Chepauk.
