= Rasikh Salam =

Indian cricketer (born 2000)

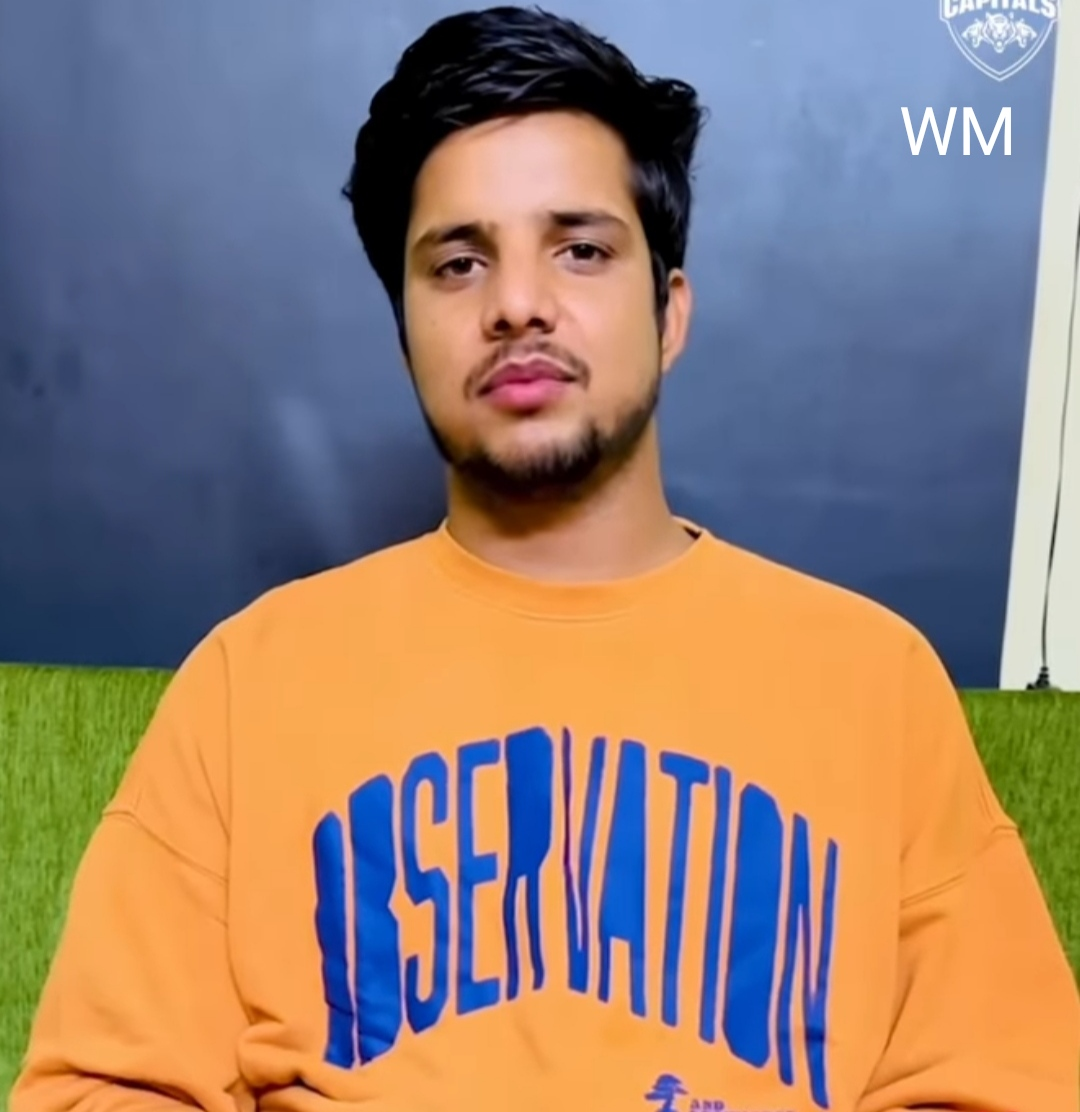
- Rasikh Salam in 2023

Personal information
- Full name: Rasikh Salam Dar
- Born: 5 April 2000 (age 26); Ashmuji, Jammu and Kashmir, India
- Batting: Right-handed
- Bowling: Right-arm fast medium
- Role: Bowler

Domestic team information
- Years: Team
- 2018–2025: Jammu & Kashmir
- 2019: Mumbai Indians
- 2022: Kolkata Knight Riders
- 2024: Delhi Capitals
- 2025–present: Royal Challengers Bengaluru
- 2025–present: Baroda cricket team

Career statistics
Competition	FC	LA	T20
Matches	5	10	35
Runs scored	52	44	75
Batting average	17.33	44.00	8.33
100s/50s	0/0	0/0	0/0
Top score	40	21*	10*
Balls bowled	579	503	715
Wickets	13	13	45
Bowling average	25.23	37.46	22.35
5 wickets in innings	0	0	1
10 wickets in match	0	–	–
Best bowling	3/26	4/23	6/31
Catches/stumpings	1/–	1/–	7/–
- Source: ESPNcricinfo, 27 March 2025

Rasikh Salam Dar (born 5 April 2000) is an Indian cricketer who previously played for Jammu and Kashmir and now plays for Baroda in domestic cricket. He also plays for Royal Challengers Bengaluru in the Indian Premier League (IPL). In December 2018, he was signed by the Mumbai Indians in the player auction for the 2019 Indian Premier League Season. He became the third cricketer from Jammu and Kashmir to play in the Indian Premier League. At 17 years and 353 days, he became the youngest player to make his debut for the Mumbai Indians. However, in June 2019, the Board of Control for Cricket in India (BCCI) banned him for two years following a "discrepancy" in his birth certificate.

He made his List A debut for Jammu & Kashmir in the 2018–19 Vijay Hazare Trophy on 3 October 2018. He made his first-class debut for Jammu & Kashmir in the 2018–19 Ranji Trophy on 30 December 2018. He made his Twenty20 debut for Jammu & Kashmir in the 2018–19 Syed Mushtaq Ali Trophy on 22 February 2019. He was released by the Mumbai Indians ahead of the 2020 IPL auction. In February 2022, he was signed by the Kolkata Knight Riders in the auction for the 2022 Indian Premier League Season. He was acquired by Delhi Capitals in the 2024 Indian Premier League auction as a fast bowler. In the 2025 Indian Premier League auction, he was sold to Royal Challengers Bengaluru, winning his maiden IPL title that same season. The following season, he took 19 wickets, as RCB won back-to-back IPL titles.
