= West Indian cricket team in India in 2026–27 =

International cricket tour

	India	West Indies
- Dates: 27 September – 17 October 2026
Captains	Shubman Gill (ODIs); Shreyas Iyer (T20Is)	Shai Hope

One Day International series
- Results: India won the 3-match series 2–1
Most runs	Shubman Gill (334)	Shai Hope (278)
Most wickets	Kuldeep Yadav (7)	Jayden Seales (4)
- Player of the series: Shubman Gill (Ind)

Twenty20 International series
- Results: 5-match series drawn 2–2
Most runs	Shreyas Iyer (181)	Shai Hope (261)
Most wickets	Arshdeep Singh (5); Naman Dhir (5)	Keemo Paul (8)
- Player of the series: Shai Hope (WI)

The West Indies cricket team toured India in September and October 2026 to play the India cricket team. The tour consisted of three One Day International (ODI) and five Twenty20 Internationals (T20I) matches. In March 2026, the Board of Control for Cricket in India (BCCI) confirmed the fixtures for the tour, as a part of the 2026–27 home international season.

India won the ODI series by 2–1, however the T20I series between the two ended in a draw of 2–2 after the fifth T20I ended in a washout.

== Squads ==
India		West Indies	
ODIs	T20Is	ODIs	T20Is
Shubman Gill (c); KL Rahul (vc, wk); Gurnoor Brar; Naman Dhir; Ruturaj Gaikwad; Ravindra Jadeja; Yashasvi Jaiswal; Dhruv Jurel (wk); Anshul Kamboj; Virat Kohli; Prasidh Krishna; Auqib Nabi; Nitish Kumar Reddy; Rohit Sharma; Mohammed Siraj; Kuldeep Yadav	Shreyas Iyer (c); Tilak Varma (vc); Ravi Bishnoi; Naman Dhir; Shivam Dube; Ishan Kishan (wk); Bhuvneshwar Kumar; Axar Patel; Nitish Kumar Reddy; Sanju Samson (wk); Abhishek Sharma; Arshdeep Singh; Vaibhav Sooryavanshi; Washington Sundar; Kuldeep Yadav; Mayank Yadav; Prince Yadav	Shai Hope (c, wk); Jewel Andrew (wk); John Campbell; Keacy Carty; Roston Chase; Matthew Forde; Justin Greaves; Amir Jangoo (wk); Alzarri Joseph; Shamar Joseph; Vitel Lawes; Gudakesh Motie; Keemo Paul; Sherfane Rutherford; Jayden Seales	Shai Hope (c, wk); Jewel Andrew (wk); Roston Chase; Matthew Forde; Shimron Hetmyer; Akeal Hosein; Amir Jangoo; Shamar Joseph; Gudakesh Motie; Keemo Paul; Kamil Pooran; Rovman Powell; Sherfane Rutherford; Quentin Sampson; Romario Shepherd; Shamar Springer

On 1 October, Prasidh Krishna was ruled out of the last ODI due to hamstring injury and replaced by Anshul Kamboj. On 5 October, Amir Jangoo was added into the T20I squad as an injury cover for Jewel Andrew who had sustained a finger injury in 3rd ODI. On 16 October 2026, Arshdeep Singh was ruled out of 5th T20I due to shoulder injury and was replaced by Bhuvneshwar Kumar.

== ODI series ==
=== 1st ODI ===
27 September 2026
14:00 (D/N)
Scorecard

West Indies; 295/7 (50 overs)	v	India; 300/2 (41.4 overs)
Justin Greaves 101 (108); Kuldeep Yadav 4/40 (10 overs)		Virat Kohli 139* (88); Roston Chase 1/64 (10 overs)

India won by 8 wickets
Greenfield International Stadium, Thiruvananthapuram
Umpires: Jayaraman Madanagopal (Ind) and Sam Nogajski (Aus)
Player of the match: Kuldeep Yadav (Ind)

- India won the toss and elected to field.
- Naman Dhir (Ind) made his ODI debut.
- Justin Greaves (WI) scored his maiden century in ODIs.
- Virat Kohli (Ind) scored his 15,000th run in ODIs, becoming the fastest batter to achieve this record.

=== 2nd ODI ===
30 September 2026
14:00 (D/N)
Scorecard

West Indies; 405/7 (50 overs)	v	India; 406/2 (43.3 overs)
Amir Jangoo 114 (77); Kuldeep Yadav 2/65 (10 overs)		Shubman Gill 223* (133); Shamar Joseph 1/52 (6 overs)

India won by 8 wickets
Assam Cricket Association Stadium, Guwahati
Umpires: Sharfuddoula (Ban) and Virender Sharma (Ind)
Player of the match: Shubman Gill (Ind)

- India won the toss and elected to field.
- Auqib Nabi (Ind) made his ODI debut.
- KL Rahul (Ind) played in his 100th ODI match.
- Kuldeep Yadav (Ind) took his 200th wicket in ODIs.
- West Indies registered their highest ever total in ODIs.
- Rohit Sharma (Ind) scored his 12,000th run in ODIs. He also became the first batsman to hit 200 sixes in a single country.
- Shubman Gill (Ind) became the second batsman after Rohit Sharma to score two double-centuries in ODIs.
- Gill's double century was the second fastest in terms of balls faced (117) in ODIs. He also made the highest individual score by a captain in ODIs. It was also the first time that an Indian batsman scored double century while chasing.
- 5 centuries were scored in this match, the highest in any ODI match.
- This was India's highest successful run-chase in ODIs. This was also the third highest successful run-chase in the history of ODIs.

=== 3rd ODI ===
3 October 2026
14:00 (D/N)
Scorecard

India; 351/7 (50 overs)	v	West Indies; 352/5 (48.2 overs)
KL Rahul 129* (87); Jayden Seales 3/62 (10 overs)		Shai Hope 162* (143); Naman Dhir 1/33 (5.2 overs)

West Indies won by 5 wickets
Maharaja Yadavindra Singh International Cricket Stadium, New Chandigarh
Umpires: Jayaraman Madanagopal (Ind) and Sam Nogajski (Aus)
Player of the match: Shai Hope (WI)

- India won the toss and elected to bat.
- This was the first ODI game to be played at this venue.
- Anshul Kamboj (Ind) made his ODI debut.
- This was West Indies's highest successful run chase in ODIs.
- Shai Hope made the highest individual score for West Indies while chasing in ODIs.

== T20I series ==
=== 1st T20I ===
6 October 2026
19:00 (N)
Scorecard

West Indies; 171 (19.1 overs)	v	India; 172/2 (14.4 overs)
Sherfane Rutherford 56 (34); Naman Dhir 3/31 (4 overs)		Shreyas Iyer 102* (43); Akeal Hosein 1/37 (4 overs)

India won by 8 wickets
Ekana Cricket Stadium, Lucknow
Umpires: Nitin Menon (Ind) and Virender Sharma (Ind)
Player of the match: Shreyas Iyer (Ind)

- India won the toss and elected to field.
- Naman Dhir (Ind) and Kamil Pooran (WI) both made their T20I debuts.
- Akeal Hosein (WI) played his 100th T20I match.
- Shreyas Iyer (Ind) scored his maiden century in T20Is.

=== 2nd T20I ===
9 October 2026
19:00 (N)
Scorecard

India; 249/5 (20 overs)	v	West Indies; 252/4 (18.3 overs)
Sanju Samson 82 (41); Roston Chase 3/24 (4 overs)		Shai Hope 102* (45); Mayank Yadav 3/36 (3 overs)

West Indies won by 6 wickets
JSCA International Stadium, Ranchi
Umpires: Jayaraman Madanagopal (Ind) and Rohan Pandit (Ind)
Player of the match: Shai Hope (WI)

- West Indies won the toss and elected to field.
- Sherfane Rutherford (WI) scored his 1,000th run in T20Is.
- This was West Indies's highest successful run-chase in T20Is. This was also the second highest successful run-chase in the history of T20Is.
- The 501 runs scored in this match was the second highest match aggregate in T20Is.

=== 3rd T20I ===
11 October 2026
19:00 (N)
Scorecard

India; 223 (20 overs)	v	West Indies; 209/7 (20 overs)
Abhishek Sharma 69 (30); Roston Chase 2/38 (4 overs)		Shimron Hetmyer 43 (26); Arshdeep Singh 3/44 (4 overs)

India won by 14 runs
Holkar Stadium, Indore
Umpires: Jayaraman Madanagopal (Ind) and Virender Sharma (Ind)
Player of the match: Arshdeep Singh (Ind)

- West Indies won the toss and elected to field.
- Abhishek Sharma (Ind) scored his 2,000th run in T20Is, becoming the fastest batsman to achieve this feat in terms of balls faced (1024).

=== 4th T20I ===
14 October 2026
19:00 (N)
Scorecard

West Indies; 247/3 (20 overs)	v	India; 223 (19.3 overs)
Shai Hope 102* (50); Prince Yadav 1/36 (4 overs)		Sanju Samson 56 (23); Keemo Paul 5/41 (4 overs)

West Indies won by 24 runs
Rajiv Gandhi International Cricket Stadium, Hyderabad
Umpires: Nitin Menon (Ind) and Virender Sharma (Ind)
Player of the match: Shai Hope (WI)

- India won the toss and elected to field.
- Shai Hope (WI) scored his 2,000th run in T20Is.

=== 5th T20I ===
17 October 2026
19:00 (N)
Scorecard

India; 118/5 (7.4 overs)	v	West Indies
Ishan Kishan 30 (10); Shamar Springer 2/17 (1.4 overs)

No result
M. Chinnaswamy Stadium, Bengaluru
Umpires: Nitin Menon (Ind) and Rohan Pandit (Ind)

- West Indies won the toss and elected to field.
- The match was reduced to 9 overs per side due to rain.
- No further play was possible due to rain.
