= Naman Dhir =

Indian cricketer (born 1999)

Personal information
- Born: 31 December 1999 (age 26); Ambala, Haryana, India
- Batting: Right-handed
- Bowling: Right-arm off break
- Role: All-rounder

International information
- National side: India (2026–present)
- ODI debut (cap 264): 27 September 2026 v West Indies
- Last ODI: 4 November 2026 v New Zealand
- ODI shirt no.: 46
- T20I debut (cap 125): 6 October 2026 v West Indies
- Last T20I: 22 October 2026 v New Zealand
- T20I shirt no.: 46

Domestic team information
- Years: Team
- 2022–present: Punjab
- 2024–present: Mumbai Indians

Career statistics
Competition	ODI	T20I	LA	T20
Matches	8	10	17	67
Runs scored	90	176	381	1,302
Batting average	22.50	35.20	38.10	26.57
100s/50s	0/0	0/0	0/4	0/5
Top score	30	42*	97	62*
Balls bowled	135	72	366	252
Wickets	3	5	8	13
Bowling average	45.67	27.40	45.50	31.92
5 wickets in innings	0	0	0	1
10 wickets in match	0	0	0	0
Best bowling	1/4	3/31	2/28	5/19
Catches/stumpings	4/–	1/–	18/–	38/–
- Source: Cricinfo, 23 October 2026

Naman Dhir (born 31 December 1999) is an Indian cricketer who plays for the Indian national team. He is an all-rounder, who bats right-handed and bowls right-arm off break. He represents Punjab in domestic cricket and Mumbai Indians in the Indian Premier League.

== Biography ==
Dhir was born on 31 December 1999 in Ambala. After playing cricket while in school, Dhir became the first player from Faridkot to play for Punjab's under-16 and under-25 teams. In early 2022, after being overlooked for selection for four years due to Faridkot being considered a minor district, Dhir considered giving up his cricket career, applying for Canadian permanent residency and moving to Edmonton, where his sister lived. At this time, his father urged him to play for another year. In December that year, Dhir became the first player from Faridkot to play for Punjab in the Ranji Trophy.

In August 2023, Dhir played in the Sher-e-Punjab Cup, a state league run by the Punjab Cricket Association. He played 12 innings in the tournament and finished as its second-highest scorer with 466 runs, scored at a batting average of 42.36 with a strike rate of 192.56, including two centuries and a total of 30 sixes. In the 2023–24 domestic season, Dhir scored two centuries for Punjab in the Ranji Trophy and made his official T20 debut in November 2023. He won the 2023–24 Syed Mushtaq Ali Trophy with Punjab. In the 2024 IPL auction, Mumbai Indians bought Dhir for ₹20 lakh (US$23,903.63).

Dhir made his debut for MI on 24 March 2024 against Gujarat Titans in Ahmedabad. Batting at no. 3, he hit Azmatullah Omarzai for three fours and a six in an over and finished with 20 runs off 10 balls. He went on to play seven games for MI in the 2024 IPL, and finished the tournament with 140 runs at an average of 23.33 and a strike rate of 177.21, including a top score of 62 not out off 28 balls against Lucknow Super Giants in Mumbai. He was retained by MI using a right-to-match (RTM) card for ₹5.25 crore in the 2025 IPL auction after attracting interest from four other teams. Dhir played all of MI's 16 games in the 2025 IPL, scoring 252 runs at an average of 31.50 and a strike rate of 182.60. That year, he was called up to the India A cricket team.

Dhir played 14 games for MI in the 2026 IPL and scored 318 runs at an average of 26.50 and a strike rate of 147.22. In the 2026 Sher-e-Punjab T20 League, Dhir played for Amritsar Soormas. On 8 September, Dhir scored 173 off 64 balls against Mohali Kings in Mohali, breaking the record for the highest score in an Indian domestic T20 competition. He scored 655 runs in 10 matches in the tournament at a strike rate of 217.6, including one other hundred and three fifties. He was thereafter called up to the Indian national side for the home white-ball series against West Indies, and made his international debut in the first ODI game of that series in Thiruvanathapuram. He made his T20I debut for India the next week in Lucknow.
