= Yudhvir Singh =

Indian politician

Yudhvir Singh (born 1897, Jaipur, d. 1983, New Delhi) was an Indian freedom fighter, politician and homeopathic doctor.

Singh studied in Agra and Allahabad. He began practicing homeopathic medicine in 1920. He was a member of the Arya Samaj, and edited the publication Arya-Kumar. In 1928 he set up a Homoeopathic Free Dispensary in Chandni Chowk, Delhi (the dispensary was later renamed as the 'Dr. Yudhvir Singh Homoeopathic Trust'), with the help of Mir Mohammed Hussain Sahib.

At the time, Singh was a leader of the Indian National Congress in Delhi. He took part in the pro-independence struggles of 1932, 1941 and the Quit India Movement of 1942. During the campaign for independence, Singh was jailed for four years and nine months. Singh's wife, Rani Raj, was also arrested during these movements.

In 1935 Singh became the secretary of the Delhi Pradesh Congress Committee. In 1937 he became a municipal commissioner of Delhi, a post he held until 1952.

Yudhvir Singh stood as the Indian National Congress candidate in the Chandni Chowk constituency. He won the seat, having obtained 4,413 votes (52.84% of the votes in the constituency).

He served as Minister, Health and Rehabilitation, Industries and Labour and Rationing and Jail in the Delhi State government between 1955 and 1956. During his tenure the Delhi Homeopathic Act was passed (the act came into force on 1 October 1956).

Singh was presented with Padma Shri in 1971 and later with Padma Bhushan in 1977 by the government.
