= Arshad Khan (Indian cricketer) =

Indian cricketer (born 1997)

Personal information
- Full name: Mohd Arshad Khan
- Born: 20 December 1997 (age 28); Gopalganj, Madhya Pradesh, India
- Batting: Left-handed
- Bowling: Left-arm medium
- Role: All-rounder

Domestic team information
- Years: Team
- 2020/21–present: Madhya Pradesh
- 2023: Mumbai Indians
- 2024: Lucknow Super Giants
- 2025–present: Gujarat Titans

Career statistics
Competition	LA	T20
Matches	8	19
Runs scored	45	160
Batting average	11.25	22.85
100s/50s	0/0	0/1
Top score	20	58*
Balls bowled	303	242
Wickets	11	15
Bowling average	24.45	28.33
5 wickets in innings	0	0
10 wickets in match	–	–
Best bowling	3/9	3/5
Catches/stumpings	3/–	6/–
- Source: ESPNcricinfo, 9 April 2025

Arshad Khan (born 20 December 1997) is an Indian cricketer who plays for Madhya Pradesh in domestic cricket and currently for Gujarat Titans in the Indian Premier League. He made his List A debut on 24 February 2021, for Madhya Pradesh in the 2020–21 Vijay Hazare Trophy. He made his T20 debut for Mumbai Indians in 2023 Indian Premier League, against Royal Challengers Bangalore on 2 April 2023.

Khan was bought by the Lucknow Super Giants at the base price of 20 lakhs during the player auction for the 2024 Indian Premier League. On 13 May 2024 coming in to bat at number 9 against Delhi Capitals, Khan struck 58* off just 33 balls with 3 fours and 5 sixes along with posting figures of 1/45 nearly taking his side to a victory.
