= Ashmuji =

Village in Jammu and Kashmir, India

Ashmuji عٲشہِ موج
- Village
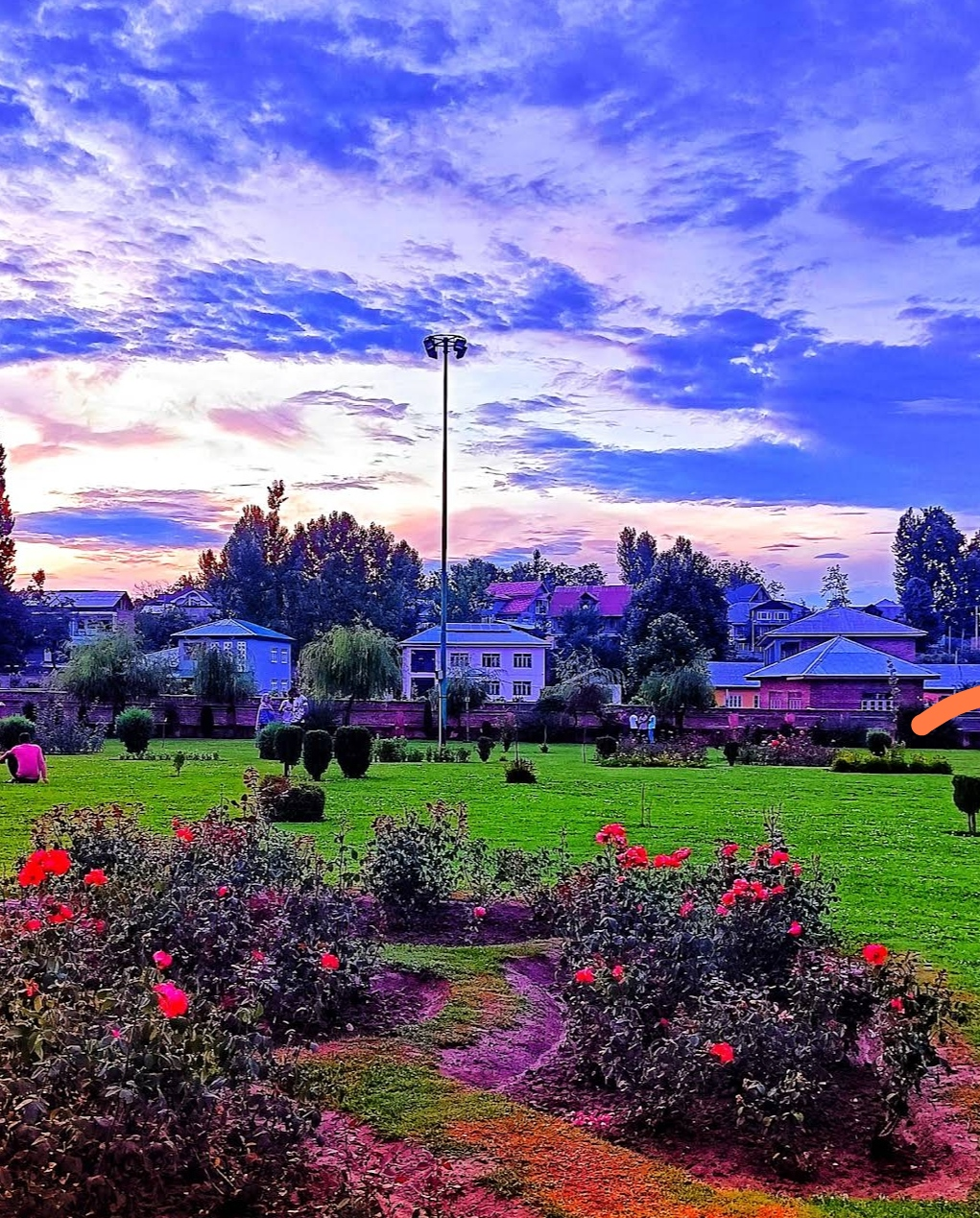
- Green Park Ashmuji in 2023
- Interactive map of Ashmuji
- Location in Jammu and Kashmir, India Ashmuji (India)
- Coordinates: 33°40′21″N 75°04′25″E
- Country: India
- Union territory: Jammu and Kashmir
- District: Kulgam

Languages
  - Official: Kashmiri, Urdu, Hindi, English
- Time zone: UTC+5:30 (IST)
- PIN: 192231
- Telephone code: 01932
- Vehicle registration: JK 18

Ashmuji known as Ash-Mouj is a village in Kulgam district of Jammu and Kashmir in India.The name Ashmuji originates from two words: “Aisha,” an Islamic Arabic female name, and “Mouji,” a Kashmiri term for “mother.” Together, they form the name of the village, Ashmuji.

== Demographics and government ==
The literacy rate of Ashmuji is 75.41%, higher than state average of 67.16%. Male literacy is around 78.66% while female literacy is 56.14%.

Ashmuji is a municipal committee city in the districts of Kulgam, Jammu and Kashmir. The Ashmuji city is divided into 5 wards for which elections are held every 5 years. The Ashmuji Municipal Committee has population of 5,567 of which 2,824 are males while 2,743 are females as per report released by Census India 2011.

Ashmuji Municipal Committee has total administration over 1,016 houses to which it supplies basic amenities like water and sewerage. It is also authorize to build roads within Municipal Committee limits and impose taxes on properties coming under its jurisdiction.

== Ashmuji Data ==
Ashmuji Data
Particulars	Total	Males	Females
Total no. of houses	1016	-	-
Population	5567	2824	2743
Child (0–6)	15.72%	-	-
Schedule caste	0	0	0
Schedule tribe	0	0	0
Literacy	67.41%	77.66%	56.14%
Total Workers	1911	1397	514
Main Workers	-	-	-
Marginal Workers	-	-	-

== Ashmuji Religion Data ==
Ashmuji Religion Percentage
Muslim	99.73%
Hindu	0.13%
Christian	0.09%
Sikh	0.00%
Buddhist	0.04%
Jain	0.00%
Others	0.00%
No Religion	0.01%

== Demographics ==
The literacy rate of Ashmuji is 67.41% higher than state average of 67.16%. In Ashmuji, the male literacy rate is around 78.66% while the female literacy rate is 56.14%.

Population
Females	45.6%
Males	54.4%
Percentage of Males & Females out of Total Population

Literacy Rate
Females	56.14%
Males	78.66%
Percentage of Males & Females out of Total Population

== Parks ==
• Green Park Ashmuji

• Mini Park Kantchowa

== Stadiums ==
• Sports Stadium Ashmuji

• Seeki Ground Ashmuji

• Mirpora Ground Ashmuji

== Schools ==
- Hanfia Model Institute Ashmuji
- Modern English Medium School Ashmuji
- Govt. Higher Secondary School Ashmuji
- FBI Ashmuji
- PBS Ashmuji
- Govt Girls Middle school Ashmuji
- Govt middle school mirpora Ashmuji
