= Mallika Sagar =

Indian art collector and auctioneer

- Born: 3 August 1975 (age 50); Bombay (now Mumbai), Maharashtra, India
- Occupations: Auctioneer; Art collector

Mallika Sagar is an Indian art collector and auctioneer.

== Biography ==
Sagar was born on 3 August 1975 in Bombay. She was introduced to auctioneering as a teenager when she read a book where the protagonist was a female auctioneer, which inspired her to become an auctioneer.

== Career ==
Sagar graduated with a degree in the art history at Bryn Mawr College in Philadelphia. In 2001, she began her career at the New York City office of international auction house Christie's, becoming the first Indian woman auctioneer at the company. She specialized in modern art and served as an auctioneer at other auction houses such as the Pundole's Art Galleries in Mumbai.

Sagar made her first appearance as a sports auctioneer in 2021 by hosting Pro Kabaddi League player auction ahead of the competition's eight season and was the first female auctioneer to host a Pro Kabaddi League auction. She received an invitation from the auctioneer Hugh Edmeades to serve as his alternative as a precautionary measure prior to the 2021 Indian Premier League auction as the event was held during the middle of the COVID-19 pandemic. She hosted the player auction as an auctioneer for the inaugural edition of the Women's Premier League. She was announced as the auctioneer for the 2024 Indian Premier League auction in Dubai, replacing Edmeades. She was the first female auctioneer of the Indian Premier League. In November 2024, she was appointed as the auctioneer to host the 2025 Indian Premier League auction.
