= 2021 Rajasthan Royals season =

Indian cricket team

Rajasthan Royals
2021 season
- Coach: Trevor Penney (Lead Assistant Coach)
- Captain: Sanju Samson
- Ground(s): Sawai Mansingh Stadium
- Tournament performance: League stage (7th)
- Most runs: Sanju Samson (484)
- Most wickets: Chris Morris (15)

The 2021 season was the 12th season for the Indian Premier League franchise Rajasthan Royals. After winning only 5 matches out of 14 matches, they finished seventh in the tournament.

== Background ==
=== Player retention and transfers ===
The Rajasthan Royals retained 17 players and released eight players.

Retained
Sanju Samson, Ben Stokes, Jofra Archer, Jos Buttler, Mahipal Lomror, Manan Vohra, Mayank Markande, Rahul Tewatia, Riyan Parag, Shreyas Gopal, Robin Uthappa (traded to Chennai Super Kings), Jaydev Unadkat, Yashasvi Jaiswal, Anuj Rawat, Kartik Tyagi, David Miller, Andrew Tye

Released
Steve Smith, Akash Singh, Aniruddha Joshi, Ankit Rajpoot, Oshane Thomas, Shashank Singh, Tom Curran, Varun Aaron

Added
Shivam Dube, Chris Morris, Mustafizur Rahman, Liam Livingstone, Chetan Sakariya, Kuldip Yadav, Akash Singh, K. C. Carriapa

== Squad ==
- Players with international caps are listed in **bold**.

No.	Name	Nationality	Birth date	Batting style	Bowling style	Year signed	Salary	Notes
Batsmen
7	**Liam Livingstone**	England	4 August 1993 (aged 27)	Right-handed	Right-arm leg break	2021	₹75 lakh (US$77,881.90)	Overseas
10	**David Miller**	South Africa	10 June 1989 (aged 31)	Right-handed	Right-arm off break	2020	₹75 lakh (US$78,000)	Overseas
17	**Evin Lewis**	Trinidad and Tobago	27 December 1991 (aged 29)	left-handed	Right-arm off break	2021		Overseas
19	Yashasvi Jaiswal	India	28 December 2001 (aged 19)	Left-handed	Right-arm leg break	2020	₹2.4 crore (US$250,000)	
24	Manan Vohra	India	18 July 1993 (aged 27)	Right-handed	Right-arm medium	2019	₹20 lakh (US$21,000)	
All-rounders
2	**Chris Morris**	South Africa	30 April 1987 (aged 33)	Right-handed	Right-arm fast-medium	2021	₹16.25 crore (US$1.7 million)	Overseas
4	Rahul Tewatia	India	20 May 1993 (aged 27)	Left-handed	Right-arm leg break	2020	₹75 lakh (US$78,000)	Vice Captain
5	Riyan Parag	India	10 November 2001 (aged 19)	Right-handed	Right-arm leg break	2019	₹20 lakh (US$21,000)	
6	Mahipal Lomror	India	16 November 1999 (aged 21)	Left-handed	Slow left-arm orthodox	2018	₹20 lakh (US$21,000)	
25	**Shivam Dube**	India	26 June 1993 (aged 27)	Left-handed	Right-arm medium fast	2021	₹4.4 crore (US$456,907.00)	
55	**Ben Stokes**	England	4 June 1991 (aged 29)	Left-handed	Right-arm fast-medium	2018	₹12.5 crore (US$1.3 million)	Overseas; Withdrew
Wicket-keepers
11	**Sanju Samson**	India	11 November 1994 (aged 26)	Right-handed	Right-arm medium	2018	₹8 crore (US$830,740.00)	Captain
12	Anuj Rawat	India	17 October 1999 (aged 21)	Left-handed	N/A	2020	₹80 lakh (US$83,000)	
63	**Jos Buttler**	England	8 September 1990 (aged 30)	Right-handed	N/A	2018	₹4.4 crore (US$457,000)	Overseas
98	**Glenn Phillips**	New Zealand	6 December 1996 (aged 24)	Right-handed	Right-arm off break	2021	₹50 lakh (US$52,000)	Overseas
Spin Bowlers
3	Shreyas Gopal	India	4 September 1993 (aged 27)	Right-handed	Right-arm leg break	2018	₹20 lakh (US$21,000)	
26	**Tabraiz Shamsi**	South Africa	18 February 1990 (aged 31)	Right-handed	Left-arm unorthodox spin	2021		Overseas
94	K. C. Cariappa	India	13 April 1994 (aged 26)	Right-handed	Right-arm leg break	2021	₹20 lakh (US$21,000)	
99	**Mayank Markande**	India	11 November 1997 (aged 23)	Right-handed	Right-arm leg break	2020	₹20 lakh (US$21,000)	
Pace Bowlers
9	Kartik Tyagi	India	8 November 2000 (age 25)	Right-handed	Right-arm medium-fast	2020	₹1.3 crore (US$134,995.30)	
15	Kuldip Yadav	India	15 October 1996 (aged 24)	Left-handed	Left-arm medium-fast	2021	₹20 lakh (US$21,000)	
22	**Jofra Archer**	England	1 April 1995 (aged 26)	Right-handed	Right-arm fast	2018	₹7.2 crore (US$747,666.00)	Overseas; Withdrew
28	**Chetan Sakariya**	India	28 February 1998 (aged 23)	Left-handed	Left-arm medium-fast	2021	₹1.2 crore (US$120,000)	
42	**Oshane Thomas**	Jamaica	18 February 1997 (aged 24)	Right-handed	Right arm fast	2021		Overseas
68	**Andrew Tye**	Australia	12 December 1986 (aged 34)	Right-handed	Right-arm fast-medium	2020	₹1 crore (US$104,000)	Overseas; Withdrew
77	**Jaydev Unadkat**	India	18 October 1991 (aged 29)	Right-handed	Left-arm fast	2020	₹3 crore (US$311,527.50)	
90	**Mustafizur Rahman**	Bangladesh	6 September 1995 (aged 25)	Left-handed	Left-arm fast-medium	2021	₹1 crore (US$103,842.50)	Overseas
117	Akash Singh	India	26 April 2002 (aged 18)	Right-handed	Left-arm medium-fast	2021	₹20 lakh (US$21,000)	
Source:RR Players

== Administration and support staff ==
Position	Name
Owner	Manoj Badale, Lachlan Murdoch, Gerry Cardinale
COO	Jake Lush McCrum
CEO	Mike Fordham
Team Manager	Romi Bhinder
Brand ambassador and mentor	Shane Warne
Director of Cricket	Kumar Sangakkara
Assistant coach	Trevor Penney
Development and performance director	Zubin Bharucha
Batting coach	Amol Mazumdar
Spin bowling coach	Sairaj Bahutule
Team Liaison and spin bowling consultant	Ish Sodhi
Fast bowling coach	Rob Cassell
Fast bowling development coach	Steffan Jones
Fielding coach	Dishant Yagnik
Physiotherapist	John Gloster
Strength and conditioning coach	Rajamani Prabhu
Team doctor	Rob Young

== Kit manufacturers and sponsors ==
Kit manufacturer	Shirt sponsor (chest)	Shirt sponsor (back)	Chest Branding
Alcis Sports	Expo 2020	BKT Tyres	KEI
Source :RR Sponsors Archived 1 March 2022 at the Wayback Machine

T20 uniform

== Teams and standings ==
=== Results by match ===
Round	1	2	3	4	5	6	7	8	9	10	11	12	13	14
Result	L	W	L	L	W	L	W	W	L	L	L	W	L	L
Position	6	5	6	8	6	7	5	5	6	6	7	6	7	7

Source: Fixtures
W = Win; L = Loss; NR = No Result

=== League table 2021 ===
Pos	Team	Pld	W	L	NR	Pts	NRR	
1	Delhi Capitals (3rd)	14	10	4	0	20	0.481	Advanced to Qualifier 1
2	Chennai Super Kings (C)	14	9	5	0	18	0.455	Advanced to Qualifier 1
3	Royal Challengers Bangalore (4th)	14	9	5	0	18	−0.140	Advanced to the Eliminator
4	Kolkata Knight Riders (R)	14	7	7	0	14	0.587	Advanced to the Eliminator
5	Mumbai Indians	14	7	7	0	14	0.116	
6	Punjab Kings	14	6	8	0	12	−0.001	
7	Rajasthan Royals	14	5	9	0	10	−0.993	
8	Sunrisers Hyderabad	14	3	11	0	6	−0.545	

Source: ESPNcricinfo
(C) Champions; (R) Runners-up
The four top-ranked teams qualified for the playoffs.

== League stage ==
The full schedule was published on the IPL website on 7 March 2021.

=== Matches ===
Match 4
12 April 2021
19:30 (N)
Scorecard

Punjab Kings; 221/6 (20 overs)	v	Rajasthan Royals; 217/7 (20 overs)
KL Rahul 91 (50); Chetan Sakariya 3/31 (4 overs)		Sanju Samson 119 (63); Arshdeep Singh 3/35 (4 overs)

Punjab Kings won by 4 runs
Wankhede Stadium, Mumbai
Umpires: Anil Chaudhary (Ind) and Sundaram Ravi (Ind)
Player of the match: Sanju Samson (Rajasthan Royals)

- Rajasthan Royals won the toss and elected to field.

Match 7
15 April 2021
19:30 (N)
Scorecard

Delhi Capitals; 147/8 (20 overs)	v	Rajasthan Royals; 150/7 (19.4 overs)
Rishabh Pant 51 (32); Jaydev Unadkat 3/15 (4 overs)		David Miller 62 (43); Avesh Khan 3/32 (4 overs)

Rajasthan Royals won by 3 wickets
Wankhede Stadium, Mumbai
Umpires: Sundaram Ravi (Ind) and Virender Sharma (Ind)
Player of the match: Jaydev Unadkat (Rajasthan Royals)

- Rajasthan Royals won the toss and elected to field.

Match 12
19 April 2021
19:30 (N)
Scorecard

Chennai Super Kings; 188/9 (20 overs)	v	Rajasthan Royals; 143/9 (20 overs)
Faf du Plessis 33 (17); Chetan Sakariya 3/36 (4 overs)		Jos Buttler 49 (35); Moeen Ali 3/7 (3 overs)

Chennai Super Kings won by 45 runs
Wankhede Stadium, Mumbai
Umpires: Paul Reiffel (Aus) and Virender Sharma (Ind)
Player of the match: Moeen Ali (Chennai Super Kings)

- Rajasthan Royals won the toss and elected to field.
- MS Dhoni became the first player to play 200 matches as a captain in the IPL.

Match 16
22 April 2021
19:30 (N)
Scorecard

Rajasthan Royals; 177/9 (20 overs)	v	Royal Challengers Bangalore; 181/0 (16.3 overs)
Shivam Dube 46 (32); Mohammed Siraj 3/27 (4 overs)		Devdutt Padikkal 101* (52)

Royal Challengers Bangalore won by 10 wickets
Wankhede Stadium, Mumbai
Umpires: Jayaraman Madanagopal (Ind) and Sundaram Ravi (Ind)
Player of the match: Devdutt Padikkal (Royal Challengers Bangalore)

- Royal Challengers Bangalore won the toss and elected to field.
- Virat Kohli (Royal Challengers Bangalore) became the first player to score 6,000 runs in the IPL.

Match 18
24 April 2021
19:30 (N)
Scorecard

Kolkata Knight Riders; 133/9 (20 overs)	v	Rajasthan Royals; 134/4 (18.5 overs)
Rahul Tripathi 36 (26); Chris Morris 4/23 (4 overs)		Sanju Samson 42* (41); Varun Chakravarthy 2/32 (4 overs)

Rajasthan Royals won by 6 wickets
Wankhede Stadium, Mumbai
Umpires: Sundaram Ravi (Ind) and Navdeep Singh (Ind)
Player of the match: Chris Morris (Rajasthan Royals)

- Rajasthan Royals won the toss and elected to field.

Match 24
29 April 2021
15:30 (D/N)
Scorecard

Rajasthan Royals; 171/4 (20 overs)	v	Mumbai Indians; 172/3 (18.3 overs)
Sanju Samson 42 (27); Rahul Chahar 2/33 (4 overs)		Quinton de Kock 70* (50); Chris Morris 2/33 (4 overs)

Mumbai Indians won by 7 wickets
Arun Jaitley Stadium, Delhi
Umpires: K. N. Ananthapadmanabhan (Ind) and Chris Gaffaney (NZ)
Player of the match: Quinton de Kock (Mumbai Indians)

- Mumbai Indians won the toss and elected to field.

Match 28
2 May 2021
15:30 (D/N)
Scorecard

Rajasthan Royals; 220/3 (20 overs)	v	Sunrisers Hyderabad; 165/8 (20 overs)
Jos Buttler 124 (64); Rashid Khan 1/24 (4 overs)		Manish Pandey 31 (20); Mustafizur Rahman 3/20 (4 overs)

Rajasthan Royals won by 55 runs
Arun Jaitley Stadium, Delhi
Umpires: Chris Gaffaney (NZ) and Chettithody Shamshuddin (Ind)
Player of the match: Jos Buttler (Rajasthan Royals)

- Sunrisers Hyderabad won the toss and elected to field.

Match 32
21 September 2021
19:30 (N)
Scorecard

Rajasthan Royals; 185 (20 overs)	v	Punjab Kings; 183/4 (20 overs)
Yashasvi Jaiswal 49 (36); Arshdeep Singh 5/32 (4 overs)		Mayank Agarwal 67 (43); Kartik Tyagi 2/29 (4 overs)

Rajasthan Royals won by 2 runs
Dubai International Cricket Stadium, Dubai
Umpires: Anil Chaudhary (Ind) and Michael Gough (Eng)
Player of the match: Kartik Tyagi (Rajasthan Royals)

- Punjab Kings won the toss and elected to field.

Match 36
25 September 2021
15:30 (D/N)
Scorecard

Delhi Capitals; 154/6 (20 overs)	v	Rajasthan Royals; 121/6 (20 overs)
Shreyas Iyer 43 (32); Mustafizur Rahman 2/22 (4 overs)		Sanju Samson 70* (53); Anrich Nortje 2/18 (4 overs)

Delhi Capitals won by 33 runs
Sheikh Zayed Cricket Stadium, Abu Dhabi
Umpires: Chris Gaffaney (NZ) and Ulhas Gandhe (Ind)
Player of the match: Shreyas Iyer (Delhi Capitals)

- Rajasthan Royals won the toss and elected to field.

Match 40
27 September 2021
19:30 (N)
Scorecard

Rajasthan Royals; 164/5 (20 overs)	v	Sunrisers Hyderabad; 167/3 (18.3 overs)
Sanju Samson 82 (57); Siddarth Kaul 2/36 (4 overs)		Jason Roy 60 (42); Mahipal Lomror 1/22 (3 overs)

Sunrisers Hyderabad won by 7 wickets
Dubai International Cricket Stadium, Dubai
Umpires: K. N. Ananthapadmanabhan (Ind) and Navdeep Singh (Ind)
Player of the match: Jason Roy (Sunrisers Hyderabad)

- Rajasthan Royals won the toss and elected to bat.

Match 43
29 September 2021
19:30 (N)
Scorecard

Rajasthan Royals; 149/9 (20 overs)	v	Royal Challengers Bangalore; 153/3 (17.1 overs)
Evin Lewis 58 (37); Harshal Patel 3/34 (4 overs)		Glenn Maxwell 50* (30); Mustafizur Rahman 2/20 (3 overs)

Royal Challengers Bangalore won by 7 wickets
Dubai International Cricket Stadium, Dubai
Umpires: K. N. Ananthapadmanabhan (Ind) and Anil Dandekar (Ind)
Player of the match: Yuzvendra Chahal (Royal Challengers Bangalore)

- Royal Challengers Bangalore won the toss and elected to field.

Match 47
2 October 2021
19:30 (N)
Scorecard

Chennai Super Kings; 189/4 (20 overs)	v	Rajasthan Royals; 190/3 (17.3 overs)
Ruturaj Gaikwad 101* (60); Rahul Tewatia 3/39 (4 overs)		Shivam Dube 64* (42); Shardul Thakur 2/30 (4 overs)

Rajasthan Royals won by 7 wickets
Sheikh Zayed Cricket Stadium, Abu Dhabi
Umpires: Chris Gaffaney (NZ) and Virender Sharma (Ind)
Player of the match: Ruturaj Gaikwad (Chennai Super Kings)

- Rajasthan Royals won the toss and elected to field.

Match 51
5 October 2021
19:30 (N)
Scorecard

Rajasthan Royals; 90/9 (20 overs)	v	Mumbai Indians; 94/2 (8.2 overs)
Evin Lewis 24 (19); Nathan Coulter-Nile 4/14 (4 overs)		Ishan Kishan 50* (25); Mustafizur Rahman 1/32 (2.2 overs)

Mumbai Indians won by 8 wickets
Sharjah Cricket Stadium, Sharjah
Umpires: Anil Chaudhary (Ind) and Michael Gough (Eng)
Player of the match: Nathan Coulter-Nile (Mumbai Indians)

- Mumbai Indians won the toss and elected to field.
- Kuldip Yadav (Rajasthan Royals) made his T20 debut.

Match 54
7 October 2021
19:30 (N)
Scorecard

Kolkata Knight Riders; 171/4 (20 overs)	v	Rajasthan Royals; 85 (16.1 overs)
Shubman Gill 56 (44); Rahul Tewatia 1/11 (1 over)		Rahul Tewatia 44 (36); Shivam Mavi 4/21 (3.1 overs)

Kolkata Knight Riders won by 86 runs
Sharjah Cricket Stadium, Sharjah
Umpires: Michael Gough (Eng) and Saiyed Khalid (Ind)
Player of the match: Shivam Mavi (Kolkata Knight Riders)

- Rajasthan Royals won the toss and elected to field.
- Punjab Kings and Rajasthan Royals were eliminated as a result of this match.

== Statistics ==
=== Most runs ===
No.	Name	Match	Inns	NO	Runs	HS	Ave.	BF	SR	100s	50s	0	4s	6s
1	Sanju Samson	7	7	1	277	119	46.16	190	145.78	1	2	0	26	11
2	Jos Buttler	7	7	0	254	124	36.28	166	153.01	1	1	0	27	13
3	Shivam Dube	6	6	0	145	46	24.16	123	117.88	0	0	0	14	5
4	David Miller	6	6	3	102	62	34.00	80	127.50	0	1	1	11	3
5	Rahul Tewatia	7	5	0	86	40	17.20	67	128.35	0	0	0	6	4

- Source: Cricinfo

=== Most Wickets ===
No.	Name	Match	Inns	Overs	Maidens	Runs	Wickets	BBI	Ave.	Eco.	SR	4	5
1	Chris Morris	11	11	41.0	0	376	15	4/23	25.06	9.17	16.4	1	0
2	Mustafizur Rahman	14	14	51.1	0	436	14	3/20	31.14	8.41	22.21	0	0
2	Chetan Sakariya	14	14	52.0	0	426	14	3/31	30.42	8.19	22.28	0	0
4	Rahul Tewatia	14	13	37.0	0	340	8	3/39	42.50	9.18	27.75	0	0
5	Jaydev Unadkat	6	6	22.0	0	168	4	3/15	42.00	7.63	33.00	0	0

- Source: Cricinfo

== Player of the match awards ==
No.	Date	Player	Opponent	Result	Contribution	Ref.
1	12 April 2021	Sanju Samson	Punjab Kings	Lost by 4 runs	119 (63)	
2	15 April 2021	Jaydev Unadkat	Delhi Capitals	Won by 3 wickets	11* (7) & 3/15 (4 overs)	
3	24 April 2021	Chris Morris	Kolkata Knight Riders	Won by 6 wickets	4/23 (4 overs)	
4	2 May 2021	Jos Buttler	Sunrisers Hyderabad	Won by 55 runs	124 (64)	
