= 2021 Mumbai Indians season =

Indian Premier League cricket team season

Mumbai Indians
2021 season
- Coach: Mahela Jayawardene
- Captain: Rohit Sharma
- Ground(s): Wankhede Stadium
- Tournament performance: League stage (5th)
- Most runs: Rohit Sharma (381)
- Most wickets: Jasprit Bumrah (21)

The 2021 season was the 14th season for the Indian Premier League franchise Mumbai Indians. They were one of the eight teams competed in the 2021 Indian Premier League. Mumbai Indians were the defending champions, but cannot defend their title after they finished in the 5th position and edging behind Kolkata Knight Riders net run-rate at the end of the league stage. The team was captained by Rohit Sharma with Mahela Jayawardene as team coach.

== Background ==
=== Player retention and transfers ===
The Mumbai Indians retained 18 players and released seven players.

Retained Players: Rohit Sharma, Aditya Tare, Anmolpreet Singh, Anukul Roy, Dhawal Kulkarni, Hardik Pandya, Ishan Kishan, Jasprit Bumrah, Jayant Yadav, Kieron Pollard, Krunal Pandya, Quinton de Kock, Rahul Chahar, Suryakumar Yadav, Trent Boult, Chris Lynn, Saurabh Tiwary, Mohsin Khan

Released Players: Prince Balwant Rai, Digvijay Deshmukh, Lasith Malinga, Nathan Coulter-Nile, James Pattinson, Sherfane Rutherford, Mitchell McClenaghan.

Added Players:Piyush Chawla, James Neesham, Marco Jansen, Yudhvir Charak, Nathan Coulter-Nile, Adam Milne, Arjun Tendulkar

== Squad ==
- Players with international caps are listed in **bold**.

No.	Name	Nationality	Birth date	Batting style	Bowling style	Year signed	Salary	Notes
Batsmen
5	**Saurabh Tiwary**	India	30 December 1989 (aged 31)	Left-handed	Right-arm off break	2020	₹50 lakh (US$58,000)	
45	**Rohit Sharma**	India	30 April 1987 (aged 33)	Right-handed	Right-arm off break	2018	₹15 crore (US$1.8 million)	Captain
50	**Chris Lynn**	Australia	10 April 1990 (aged 31)	Right-handed	Slow left-arm orthodox	2020	₹2 crore (US$234,000)	Overseas
63	Anmolpreet Singh	India	28 March 1998 (aged 23)	Right-handed	Right-arm off break	2019	₹80 lakh (US$93,000)	
77	**Suryakumar Yadav**	India	14 September 1990 (aged 30)	Right-handed	Right-arm medium	2018	₹3.2 crore (US$374,000)	
All-rounders
33	**Hardik Pandya**	India	11 October 1993 (aged 27)	Right-Handed	Right arm medium-fast	2018	₹11 crore (US$1.3 million)	
36	**Krunal Pandya**	India	24 March 1991 (aged 30)	Left-handed	Slow left-arm orthodox	2018	₹8.8 crore (US$1.0 million)	
55	**Kieron Pollard**	Trinidad and Tobago	12 May 1987 (aged 33)	Right-handed	Right-arm medium-fast	2018	₹5.4 crore (US$631,000)	Vice-Captain, Overseas
83	**James Neesham**	New Zealand	17 September 1990 (aged 30)	Left-handed	Right-arm medium	2021	₹50 lakh (equivalent to ₹56 lakh or US$66,000 in 2023)	Overseas
Wicket-keepers
13	**Quinton de Kock**	South Africa	17 December 1992 (aged 28)	Left-handed	Left-arm orthodox	2019	₹2.8 crore (US$327,000)	Overseas
23	**Ishan Kishan**	India	18 July 1998 (aged 22)	Left-handed	—	2018	₹6.2 crore (US$724,000)	
27	Aditya Tare	India	7 November 1987 (aged 33)	Right-handed	—	2018	₹20 lakh (US$23,000)	
Spin Bowlers
6	Anukul Roy	India	30 November 1998 (aged 22)	Left-handed	Slow left-arm orthodox	2018	₹20 lakh (US$23,000)	
19	**Jayant Yadav**	India	22 January 1990 (aged 31)	Right-handed	Right-arm off break	2019	₹50 lakh (US$58,000)	
28	**Rahul Chahar**	India	4 August 1999 (aged 21)	Right-handed	Right-arm leg break	2018	₹1.9 crore (US$222,000)	
120	**Piyush Chawla**	India	24 December 1988 (aged 32)	Left-handed	Right-arm leg break	2021	₹2.4 crore (US$280,000)	
Pace Bowlers
7	**Nathan Coulter-Nile**	Australia	11 October 1987 (aged 33)	Right-handed	Right-arm fast	2021	₹5 crore (equivalent to ₹5.6 crore or US$660,000 in 2023)	Overseas
18	**Trent Boult**	New Zealand	22 July 1989 (aged 31)	Right-handed	Left-arm fast	2020	₹2.2 crore (US$260,000)	Overseas
20	**Adam Milne**	New Zealand	13 April 1992 (aged 28)	Right-handed	Right-arm fast	2021	₹3.4 crore (equivalent to ₹3.8 crore or US$450,000 in 2023)	Overseas
21	**Dhawal Kulkarni**	India	10 December 1988 (aged 32)	Right-handed	Right-arm medium-fast	2020	₹75 lakh (US$88,000)	
70	Marco Jansen	South Africa	1 May 2000 (aged 20)	Right-handed	Left-arm fast	2021	₹20 lakh (US$23,000)	Overseas
93	**Jasprit Bumrah**	India	6 December 1993 (aged 27)	Right-handed	Right-arm fast-medium	2018	₹7 crore (US$817,322.00)	
—	Arjun Tendulkar	India	24 September 1999 (aged 21)	Left-handed	Left-arm medium	2021	₹20 lakh (US$23,000)	Injured
—	Yudhvir Charak	India	13 September 1997 (aged 23)	Right-handed	Right-arm medium-fast	2021	₹20 lakh (US$23,000)	
—	Mohsin Khan	India	15 July 1998 (aged 22)	Left-handed	Left-arm medium-fast	2020	₹20 lakh (US$23,000)	
—	Simarjeet Singh	India	17 January 1998 (aged 23)	Right-handed	Right-arm medium-fast	2021	₹20 lakh (US$23,000)	
Source:MI Players

== Administration and support staff ==
Position	Name
Owner	Akash Ambani (Reliance Industries)
Team manager	Rahul Sanghvi
Director of Cricket Operations	Zaheer Khan
Head coach	Mahela Jayawardene
Batting coach	Robin Singh
Bowling coach	Shane Bond
Fielding coach	James Pamment
Physiotherapist	Kevin Sims
Strength and conditioning coach	Paul Chapman
Source:MI Staff

== Kit manufacturers and sponsors ==
Kit manufacturer	Shirt sponsor (front)	Shirt sponsor (back)	Chest Branding
Performax	Samsung	DHL	Marriott Bonvoy
Source : mumbaiindians.com

T20 uniform

== Teams and standings ==
=== Results by match ===
Round	1	2	3	4	5	6	7	8	9	10	11	12	13	14
Result	L	W	W	L	L	W	W	L	L	L	W	L	W	W
Position	8	2	1	4	4	4	4	4	6	7	5	6	5	5

Source: Fixtures
W = Win; L = Loss; NR = No Result

Pos	Team	Pld	W	L	NR	Pts	NRR	
1	Delhi Capitals (3rd)	14	10	4	0	20	0.481	Advanced to Qualifier 1
2	Chennai Super Kings (C)	14	9	5	0	18	0.455	Advanced to Qualifier 1
3	Royal Challengers Bangalore (4th)	14	9	5	0	18	−0.140	Advanced to the Eliminator
4	Kolkata Knight Riders (R)	14	7	7	0	14	0.587	Advanced to the Eliminator
5	Mumbai Indians	14	7	7	0	14	0.116	
6	Punjab Kings	14	6	8	0	12	−0.001	
7	Rajasthan Royals	14	5	9	0	10	−0.993	
8	Sunrisers Hyderabad	14	3	11	0	6	−0.545	

Source: ESPNcricinfo
(C) Champions; (R) Runners-up
The four top-ranked teams qualified for the playoffs.

== League stage ==
The full schedule was published on the IPL website on 7 March 2021.

=== Matches ===
Match 1
9 April 2021
19:30 (N)
Scorecard

Mumbai Indians; 159/9 (20 overs)	v	Royal Challengers Bangalore; 160/8 (20 overs)
Chris Lynn 49 (35); Harshal Patel 5/27 (4 overs)		AB de Villiers 48 (27); Jasprit Bumrah 2/26 (4 overs)

Royal Challengers Bangalore won by 2 wickets
M. A. Chidambaram Stadium, Chennai
Umpires: K. N. Ananthapadmanabhan (Ind) and Nitin Menon (Ind)
Player of the match: Harshal Patel (Royal Challengers Bangalore)

- Royal Challengers Bangalore won the toss and elected to field.

Match 5
13 April 2021
19:30 (N)
Scorecard

Mumbai Indians; 152 (20 overs)	v	Kolkata Knight Riders; 142/7 (20 overs)
Suryakumar Yadav 56 (36); Andre Russell 5/15 (2 overs)		Nitish Rana 57 (47); Rahul Chahar 4/27 (4 overs)

Mumbai Indians won by 10 runs
M. A. Chidambaram Stadium, Chennai
Umpires: Chris Gaffaney (NZ) and Chettithody Shamshuddin (Ind)
Player of the match: Rahul Chahar (Mumbai Indians)

- Kolkata Knight Riders won the toss and elected to field.

Match 9
17 April 2021
19:30 (N)
Scorecard

Mumbai Indians; 150/5 (20 overs)	v	Sunrisers Hyderabad; 137 (19.4 overs)
Quinton de Kock 40 (39); Vijay Shankar 2/19 (3 overs)		Jonny Bairstow 43 (22); Rahul Chahar 3/19 (4 overs)

Mumbai Indians won by 13 runs
M. A. Chidambaram Stadium, Chennai
Umpires: Chris Gaffaney (NZ) and Krishnamachari Srinivasan (Ind)
Player of the match: Kieron Pollard (Mumbai Indians)

- Mumbai Indians won the toss and elected to bat.

Match 13
20 April 2021
19:30 (N)
Scorecard

Mumbai Indians; 137/9 (20 overs)	v	Delhi Capitals; 138/4 (19.1 overs)
Rohit Sharma 44 (30); Amit Mishra 4/24 (4 overs)		Shikhar Dhawan 45 (42); Kieron Pollard 1/9 (1.1 overs)

Delhi Capitals won by 6 wickets
M. A. Chidambaram Stadium, Chennai
Umpires: Chris Gaffaney (NZ) and Chettithody Shamshuddin (Ind)
Player of the match: Amit Mishra (Delhi Capitals)

- Mumbai Indians won the toss and elected to bat.

Match 17
23 April 2021
19:30 (N)
Scorecard

Mumbai Indians; 131/6 (20 overs)	v	Punjab Kings; 132/1 (17.4 overs)
Rohit Sharma 63 (52); Ravi Bishnoi 2/21 (4 overs); Mohammed Shami 2/21 (4 overs)		KL Rahul 60* (52); Rahul Chahar 1/19 (4 overs)

Punjab Kings won by 9 wickets
M. A. Chidambaram Stadium, Chennai
Umpires: Nitin Menon (Ind) and Chettithody Shamshuddin (Ind)
Player of the match: KL Rahul (Punjab Kings)

- Punjab Kings won the toss and elected to field.

Match 24
29 April 2021
15:30 (D/N)
Scorecard

Rajasthan Royals; 171/4 (20 overs)	v	Mumbai Indians; 172/3 (18.3 overs)
Sanju Samson 42 (27); Rahul Chahar 2/33 (4 overs)		Quinton de Kock 70* (50); Chris Morris 2/33 (4 overs)

Mumbai Indians won by 7 wickets
Arun Jaitley Stadium, Delhi
Umpires: K. N. Ananthapadmanabhan (Ind) and Chris Gaffaney (NZ)
Player of the match: Quinton de Kock (Mumbai Indians)

- Mumbai Indians won the toss and elected to field.

Match 27
1 May 2021
19:30 (N)
Scorecard

Chennai Super Kings; 218/4 (20 overs)	v	Mumbai Indians; 219/6 (20 overs)
Ambati Rayudu 72* (27); Kieron Pollard 2/12 (2 overs)		Kieron Pollard 87* (34); Sam Curran 3/34 (4 overs)

Mumbai Indians won by 4 wickets
Arun Jaitley Stadium, Delhi
Umpires: KN Ananthapadmanabhan (Ind) and C. K. Nandan (Ind)
Player of the match: Kieron Pollard (Mumbai Indians)

- Mumbai Indians won the toss and elected to field.

Match 30
19 September 2021
19:30 (N)
Scorecard

Chennai Super Kings; 156/6 (20 overs)	v	Mumbai Indians; 136/8 (20 overs)
Ruturaj Gaikwad 88* (58); Adam Milne 2/21 (4 overs)		Saurabh Tiwary 50* (40); Dwayne Bravo 3/25 (4 overs)

Chennai Super Kings won by 20 runs
Dubai International Cricket Stadium, Dubai
Umpires: Richard Illingworth (Eng) and Nitin Menon (Ind)
Player of the match: Ruturaj Gaikwad (Chennai Super Kings)

- Chennai Super Kings won the toss and elected to bat.

Match 34
23 September 2021
19:30 (N)
Scorecard

Mumbai Indians; 155/6 (20 overs)	v	Kolkata Knight Riders; 159/3 (15.1 overs)
Quinton de Kock 55 (42); Lockie Ferguson 2/27 (4 overs)		Rahul Tripathi 74* (42); Jasprit Bumrah 3/43 (4 overs)

Kolkata Knight Riders won by 7 wickets
Sheikh Zayed Cricket Stadium, Abu Dhabi
Umpires: Sundaram Ravi (Ind) and Virender Sharma (Ind)
Player of the match: Sunil Narine (Kolkata Knight Riders)

- Kolkata Knight Riders won the toss and elected to field.

Match 39
26 September 2021
19:30 (N)
Scorecard

Royal Challengers Bangalore; 165/6 (20 overs)	v	Mumbai Indians; 111 (18.1 overs)
Glenn Maxwell 56 (37); Jasprit Bumrah 3/36 (4 overs)		Rohit Sharma 43 (28); Harshal Patel 4/17 (3.1 overs)

Royal Challengers Bangalore won by 54 runs
Dubai International Cricket Stadium, Dubai
Umpires: Anil Chaudhary (Ind) and Michael Gough (Eng)
Player of the match: Glenn Maxwell (Royal Challengers Bangalore)

- Mumbai Indians won the toss and elected to field.
- Virat Kohli (Royal Challengers Bangalore) became the first Indian player and fifth overall to score 10,000 runs in T20s.
- Harshal Patel (Royal Challengers Bangalore) took a hat-trick.

Match 42
28 September 2021
19:30 (N)
Scorecard

Punjab Kings; 135/6 (20 overs)	v	Mumbai Indians; 137/4 (19 overs)
Aiden Markram 42 (29); Kieron Pollard 2/8 (1 over)		Saurabh Tiwary 45 (37); Ravi Bishnoi 2/25 (4 overs)

Mumbai Indians won by 6 wickets
Sheikh Zayed Cricket Stadium, Abu Dhabi
Umpires: Sundaram Ravi (Ind) and Virender Sharma (Ind)
Player of the match: Kieron Pollard (Mumbai Indians)

- Mumbai Indians won the toss and elected to field.

Match 46
2 October 2021
15:30 (D/N)
Scorecard

Mumbai Indians; 129/8 (20 overs)	v	Delhi Capitals; 132/6 (19.1 overs)
Suryakumar Yadav 33 (26); Avesh Khan 3/15 (4 overs)		Shreyas Iyer 33* (33); Krunal Pandya 1/18 (2.1 overs)

Delhi Capitals won by 4 wickets
Sharjah Cricket Stadium, Sharjah
Umpires: Anil Chaudhary (Ind) and Michael Gough (Eng)
Player of the match: Axar Patel (Delhi Capitals)

- Delhi Capitals won the toss and elected to field.

Match 51
5 October 2021
19:30 (N)
Scorecard

Rajasthan Royals; 90/9 (20 overs)	v	Mumbai Indians; 94/2 (8.2 overs)
Evin Lewis 24 (19); Nathan Coulter-Nile 4/14 (4 overs)		Ishan Kishan 50* (25); Mustafizur Rahman 1/32 (2.2 overs)

Mumbai Indians won by 8 wickets
Sharjah Cricket Stadium, Sharjah
Umpires: Anil Chaudhary (Ind) and Michael Gough (Eng)
Player of the match: Nathan Coulter-Nile (Mumbai Indians)

- Mumbai Indians won the toss and elected to field.
- Kuldip Yadav (Rajasthan Royals) made his T20 debut.

Match 55
8 October 2021
19:30 (N)
Scorecard

Mumbai Indians; 235/9 (20 overs)	v	Sunrisers Hyderabad; 193/8 (20 overs)
Ishan Kishan 84 (32); Jason Holder 4/52 (4 overs)		Manish Pandey 69* (41); James Neesham 2/28 (3 overs)

Mumbai Indians won by 42 runs
Sheikh Zayed Cricket Stadium, Abu Dhabi
Umpires: Tapan Sharma (Ind) and Virender Sharma (Ind)
Player of the match: Ishan Kishan (Mumbai Indians)

- Mumbai Indians won the toss and elected to bat.
- Kolkata Knight Riders qualified for the playoffs and Mumbai Indians were eliminated as a result of this match.

== Statistics ==
=== Most runs ===
No.	Name	Match	Inns	NO	Runs	HS	Ave.	BF	SR	100s	50s	0	4s	6s
1	Rohit Sharma	13	11	0	381	63	31.00	273	124.90	0	1	0	29	12
2	Suryakumar Yadav	14	12	0	317	56	18.50	173	128.32	0	1	0	24	7
3	Quinton de Kock	11	11	1	297	70*	29.70	256	116.01	0	2	0	29	7
4	Kieron Pollard	14	12	4	245	87*	33.14	153	151.63	0	1	0	15	16
5	Ishan Kishan	10	8	0	241	28	13.37	198	86.99	0	0	0	5	3
6	Krunal Pandya	13	12	1	143	39	14.88	116	115.51	0	0	0	9	6
7	Hardik Pandya	12	9	0	127	16	14.00	98	114.28	0	0	0	11	4
8	Saurabh Tiwary	5	4	2	115	50*	57.50	97	118.55	0	1	0	10	2
9	Chris Lynn	1	1	0	49	49	49.00	35	140.00	0	0	0	4	3

- Last updated: 10 October 2021
- Source:Cricinfo

=== Most wickets ===
No.	Name	Match	Inns	Overs	Maidens	Runs	Wickets	BBI	Ave.	Econ.	SR	4W	5W
1	Jasprit Bumrah	14	14	55.0	0	410	21	3/36	19.52	7.45	15.71	0	0
2	Rahul Chahar	11	11	43.0	0	318	13	4/27	24.46	7.39	19.84	1	0
2	Trent Boult	14	14	51.2	0	406	13	3/28	31.23	7.90	24.69	0	0
3	Nathan Coulter-Nile	5	5	20.0	0	127	7	4/14	18.14	6.35	17.14	1	0
4	Kieron Pollard	14	9	13.1	0	95	5	2/8	19.00	7.21	15.80	0	0
4	James Neesham	3	3	9.0	0	66	5	3/12	13.20	7.33	10.80	0	0
4	Krunal Pandya	13	12	13.1	0	265	5	1/13	53.00	7.98	39.80	0	0
5	Adam Milne	4	4	14.0	0	131	3	2/21	43.66	9.35	28.0	0	0

- Last updated: 10 October 2021
- Source:Cricinfo

== Player of the match awards ==
No.	Date	Player	Opponent	Result	Contribution	Ref.
1	13 April 2021	Rahul Chahar	Kolkata Knight Riders	Won by 10 runs	4/27 (4 overs)	
2	17 April 2021	Kieron Pollard	Sunrisers Hyderabad	Won by 13 runs	35* (22)	
3	29 April 2021	Quinton de Kock	Rajasthan Royals	Won by 7 wickets	70* (50)	
4	1 May 2021	Kieron Pollard	Chennai Super Kings	Won by 4 wickets	2/12 (2 overs) and 87* (34)	
5	28 September 2021	Kieron Pollard	Punjab Kings	Won by 6 wickets	2/8 (1 over) and 15* (7)	
6	5 October 2021	Nathan Coulter-Nile	Rajasthan Royals	Won by 8 wickets	4/14 (4 overs)	
7	8 October 2021	Ishan Kishan	Sunrisers Hyderabad	Won by 42 runs	84 (32)	
