= 2021 Chennai Super Kings season =

Indian cricket team

Chennai Super Kings
2021 season
- Coach: Stephen Fleming
- Captain: MS Dhoni
- Ground(s): M A Chidambaram Stadium, Chennai
- Tournament performance: Champions
- Most runs: Ruturaj Gaikwad (635)
- Most wickets: Shardul Thakur (21)

Chennai Super Kings (CSK) is the franchise cricket team based in Chennai, Tamil Nadu, India, which has been playing in the Indian Premier League (IPL) since the first edition of the tournament in 2008. They were one of the eight teams to compete in the 2021 Indian Premier League. The Super Kings have previously lifted the IPL title thrice (in 2010, 2011 and 2018). In the final, they beat Kolkata Knight Riders to win their fourth IPL title.

== Background ==
Chennai Super Kings kicked off 2021 season by releasing 6 players on 20 January after that they traded inRobin Uthappa from Rajasthan Royals and looking ready for Auction at 18 February with Rs 19.90 crores left in purse.

Slots left : 6 (5 Indians) (1 Overseas).

Retained Players : MS Dhoni (c), Suresh Raina (Vc), Faf du Plessis, Ravindra Jadeja, Mitchell Santner, Lungi Ngidi, Ambati Rayudu, Narayan Jagadeeshan, KM Asif, Shardul Thakur, Imran Tahir, Ruturaj Gaikwad, Deepak Chahar, Karn Sharma, Dwayne Bravo, Sam Curran, Josh Hazlewood, Ravisrinivasan Sai Kishore, Robin Uthappa(Traded).

Released Players : Murali Vijay, Piyush Chawla, Kedar Jadhav, Harbhajan Singh, Monu Kumar, Shane Watson(Retired).

Auctioned Players : Moeen Ali, Cheteshwar Pujara, Krishnappa Gowtham, Hari Nishanth, Bhagath Varma, Harishankar Reddy.

== COVID-19 impact ==
On 3 May 2021 three non-playing members of the team tested positive for COVID-19, including bowling coach Lakshmipathy Balaji and CEO Kasi Vishwanathan.

== Squad ==
- Players with international caps are listed in **bold**.

| No. | Name | Nationality | Birth date | Batting style | Bowling style | Year signed | Salary | Notes |
Batsmen
| 3 | **Suresh Raina** | India | 27 November 1986 (aged 34) | Left-handed | Right-arm off break | 2018 | ₹11 crore (US$1.2 million) | Vice Captain |
| 9 | **Ambati Rayudu** | India | 23 September 1985 (aged 35) | Right-handed | Right-arm off break | 2018 | ₹2.2 crore (US$230,000) | |
| 13 | **Faf du Plessis** | South Africa | 13 July 1984 (aged 36) | Right-handed | Right-arm leg break | 2018 | ₹1.6 crore (US$168,000) | Overseas |
| 16 | Chezhian Hari Nishanth | India | 16 August 1996 (aged 24) | Left-handed | Right-arm off break | 2021 | ₹20 lakh (US$21,000) | |
| 25 | **Cheteshwar Pujara** | India | 25 January 1988 (aged 33) | Right-handed | Right-arm leg break | 2021 | ₹50 lakh (US$52,000) | |
| 31 | **Ruturaj Gaikwad** | India | 31 January 1997 (aged 24) | Right-handed | Right-arm off break | 2019 | ₹20 lakh (US$21,000) | |
All-rounders
| 8 | **Ravindra Jadeja** | India | 6 December 1988 (aged 32) | Left-handed | Slow left-arm orthodox | 2018 | ₹7 crore (US$733,000) | |
| 10 | **Moeen Ali** | England | 18 June 1987 (aged 33) | Left-handed | Right-arm Off-break | 2021 | ₹7 crore (US$730,000) | Overseas |
| 27 | Bhagath Varma | India | 21 September 1998 (aged 22) | Right-handed | Right-arm Off-break | 2021 | ₹20 lakh (US$21,000) | |
| 47 | **Dwayne Bravo** | West Indies | 7 October 1983 (aged 37) | Right-handed | Right-arm fast-medium | 2018 | ₹6.4 crore (US$670,000) | Overseas |
| 58 | **Sam Curran** | England | 3 June 1998 (aged 22) | Left-handed | Left-arm fast-medium | 2020 | ₹5.5 crore (US$576,000) | Overseas |
| 74 | **Mitchell Santner** | New Zealand | 5 February 1992 (aged 29) | Left-handed | Slow left-arm orthodox | 2018 | ₹50 lakh (US$52,000) | Overseas |
| 79 | Krishnappa Gowtham | India | 20 October 1988 (aged 32) | Right-handed | Right-arm Off-break | 2021 | ₹9.25 crore (US$970,000) | |
Wicket-keepers
| 7 | **MS Dhoni** | India | 7 July 1981 (aged 39) | Right-handed | Right-arm medium-fast | 2018 | ₹15 crore (US$1.6 million) | Captain |
| 18 | Narayan Jagadeesan | India | 24 December 1995 (aged 25) | Right-handed | | 2018 | ₹20 lakh (US$21,000) | |
| 77 | **Robin Uthappa** | India | 11 November 1985 (aged 35) | Right-handed | Right-arm off break | 2021 | ₹3 crore (US$314,157.30) | |
Spin Bowlers
| 36 | **Karn Sharma** | India | 23 October 1987 (aged 33) | Left-handed | Right-arm leg break | 2018 | ₹5 crore (US$524,000) | |
| 99 | **Imran Tahir** | South Africa | 27 March 1979 (aged 42) | Right-handed | Right-arm leg break | 2018 | ₹1 crore (US$105,000) | Overseas |
| 96 | R Sai Kishore | India | 6 November 1996 (aged 24) | Left-handed | Slow left-arm orthodox | 2020 | ₹20 lakh (US$21,000) | |
Pace Bowlers
| 5 | **Jason Behrendorff** | Australia | 20 April 1990 (aged 30) | Right-handed | Left-arm fast-medium | 2021 | ₹1 crore (US$105,000) | Overseas, Replacement for Josh Hazlewood |
| 22 | **Lungi Ngidi** | South Africa | 29 March 1996 (aged 25) | Right-handed | Right-arm fast | 2018 | ₹50 lakh (US$52,000) | Overseas |
| 24 | KM Asif | India | 24 July 1993 (aged 27) | Right-handed | Right-arm fast-medium | 2018 | ₹40 lakh (US$42,000) | |
| 38 | **Josh Hazlewood** | Australia | 8 January 1991 (aged 30) | Left-handed | Right-arm fast-medium | 2020 | ₹2 crore (US$209,000) | Overseas |
| 46 | Harishankar Reddy | India | 2 June 1998 (aged 22) | Right-handed | Right-arm fast-medium | 2021 | ₹20 lakh (US$21,000) | |
| 54 | **Shardul Thakur** | India | 16 October 1991 (aged 29) | Right-handed | Right-arm fast-medium | 2018 | ₹2.6 crore (US$272,000) | |
| 90 | **Deepak Chahar** | India | 7 August 1992 (aged 28) | Right-handed | Right-arm fast-medium | 2018 | ₹80 lakh (US$84,000) | |
Source:CSK Players

== Administration and support staff ==
| Position | Name |
|---|---|
| Owner | N. Srinivasan (India Cements) |
| CEO | Kasinath Viswanathan |
| Team manager | Russell Radhakrishnan |
| Head coach | Stephen Fleming |
| Batting coach | Michael Hussey |
| Bowling coach | Lakshmipathy Balaji |
| Bowling consultant | Eric Simons |
| Fielding coach | Rajiv Kumar |
| Supportive Player | Shantanu Bhardwaj |
| Physical trainer | Greg King |
| Team doctor | Dr Madhu Thottappillil |
| Physio | Tommy Simsek |
Source:CSKStaffs

== Kit manufacturers and sponsors ==
| Kit manufacturer | Shirt sponsor (Front) | Shirt sponsor (Back) | Chest Branding |
|---|---|---|---|
| SEVEN | Myntra | India Cements | Gulf Oil |
Source:www.chennaisuperkings.com

T20 uniform

== Teams and standings ==
=== Results by match ===
| Round | 1 | 2 | 3 | 4 | 5 | 6 | 7 | 8 | 9 | 10 | 11 | 12 | 13 | 14 |
|---|---|---|---|---|---|---|---|---|---|---|---|---|---|---|
| Result | L | W | W | W | W | W | L | W | W | W | W | L | L | L |
| Position | 8 | 2 | 2 | 1 | 1 | 1 | 1 | 1 | 1 | 1 | 1 | 1 | 2 | 2 |

Source: Fixtures
W = Win; L = Loss; NR = No Result

=== League table ===
| Pos | Team | Pld | W | L | NR | Pts | NRR | |
|---|---|---|---|---|---|---|---|---|
| 1 | Delhi Capitals (3rd) | 14 | 10 | 4 | 0 | 20 | 0.481 | Advanced to Qualifier 1 |
| 2 | Chennai Super Kings (C) | 14 | 9 | 5 | 0 | 18 | 0.455 | Advanced to Qualifier 1 |
| 3 | Royal Challengers Bangalore (4th) | 14 | 9 | 5 | 0 | 18 | −0.140 | Advanced to the Eliminator |
| 4 | Kolkata Knight Riders (R) | 14 | 7 | 7 | 0 | 14 | 0.587 | Advanced to the Eliminator |
| 5 | Mumbai Indians | 14 | 7 | 7 | 0 | 14 | 0.116 | |
| 6 | Punjab Kings | 14 | 6 | 8 | 0 | 12 | −0.001 | |
| 7 | Rajasthan Royals | 14 | 5 | 9 | 0 | 10 | −0.993 | |
| 8 | Sunrisers Hyderabad | 14 | 3 | 11 | 0 | 6 | −0.545 | |

Source: ESPNcricinfo
(C) Champions; (R) Runners-up
The four top-ranked teams qualified for the playoffs.

== League stage ==
The full schedule was published on the IPL website on 7 March 2021.

=== Matches ===
Match 2
10 April 2021
19:30 (N)
Scorecard

| Chennai Super Kings; 188/7 (20 overs) | v | Delhi Capitals; 190/3 (18.4 overs) |
| Suresh Raina 54 (36); Chris Woakes 2/18 (3 overs) | | Shikhar Dhawan 85 (54); Shardul Thakur 2/53 (3.4 overs) |

Delhi Capitals won by 7 wickets
Wankhede Stadium, Mumbai
Umpires: Anil Chaudhary (Ind) and Virender Sharma (Ind)
Player of the match: Shikhar Dhawan (Delhi Capitals)

- Delhi Capitals won the toss and elected to field.

Match 8
16 April 2021
19:30 (N)
Scorecard

| Punjab Kings; 106/8 (20 overs) | v | Chennai Super Kings; 107/4 (15.4 overs) |
| Shahrukh Khan 47 (36); Deepak Chahar 4/13 (4 overs) | | Moeen Ali 46 (31); Mohammed Shami 2/21 (4 overs) |

Chennai Super Kings won by 6 wickets
Wankhede Stadium, Mumbai
Umpires: Anil Chaudhary (Ind) and Anil Dandekar (Ind)
Player of the match: Deepak Chahar (Chennai Super Kings)

- Chennai Super Kings won the toss and elected to field.

Match 12
19 April 2021
19:30 (N)
Scorecard

| Chennai Super Kings; 188/9 (20 overs) | v | Rajasthan Royals; 143/9 (20 overs) |
| Faf du Plessis 33 (17); Chetan Sakariya 3/36 (4 overs) | | Jos Buttler 49 (35); Moeen Ali 3/7 (3 overs) |

Chennai Super Kings won by 45 runs
Wankhede Stadium, Mumbai
Umpires: Paul Reiffel (Aus) and Virender Sharma (Ind)
Player of the match: Moeen Ali (Chennai Super Kings)

- Rajasthan Royals won the toss and elected to field.
- MS Dhoni became the first player to play 200 matches as a captain in the IPL.

Match 15
21 April 2021
19:30 (N)
Scorecard

| Chennai Super Kings; 220/3 (20 overs) | v | Kolkata Knight Riders; 202 (19.1 overs) |
| Faf du Plessis 95* (60); Andre Russell 1/27 (2 overs) | | Pat Cummins 66* (34); Deepak Chahar 4/29 (4 overs) |

Chennai Super Kings won by 18 runs
Wankhede Stadium, Mumbai
Umpires: Anil Dandekar (Ind) and Paul Reiffel (Aus)
Player of the match: Faf du Plessis (Chennai Super Kings)

- Kolkata Knight Riders won the toss and elected to field.

Match 19
25 April 2021
15:30 (D/N)
Scorecard

| Chennai Super Kings; 191/4 (20 overs) | v | Royal Challengers Bangalore; 122/9 (20 overs) |
| Ravindra Jadeja 62* (28); Harshal Patel 3/51 (4 overs) | | Devdutt Padikkal 34 (15); Ravindra Jadeja 3/13 (4 overs) |

Chennai Super Kings won by 69 runs
Wankhede Stadium, Mumbai
Umpires: Anil Chaudhary (Ind) and Virender Sharma (Ind)
Player of the match: Ravindra Jadeja (Chennai Super Kings)

- Chennai Super Kings won the toss and elected to bat.
- Harshal Patel (Royal Challengers Bangalore) bowled the joint-most expensive over in an IPL match, conceding 37 runs.

Match 23
28 April 2021
19:30 (N)
Scorecard

| Sunrisers Hyderabad; 171/3 (20 overs) | v | Chennai Super Kings; 173/3 (18.3 overs) |
| Manish Pandey 61 (46); Lungi Ngidi 2/35 (4 overs) | | Ruturaj Gaikwad 75 (44); Rashid Khan 3/36 (4 overs) |

Chennai Super Kings won by 7 wickets
Arun Jaitley Stadium, Delhi
Umpires: C. K. Nandan (Ind) and Chettithody Shamshuddin (Ind)
Player of the match: Ruturaj Gaikwad (Chennai Super Kings)

- Sunrisers Hyderabad won the toss and elected to bat.
- David Warner (Sunrisers Hyderabad) became the first player to hit fifty fifties in the IPL, and fourth to score 10,000 runs in T20s.

Match 27
1 May 2021
19:30 (N)
Scorecard

| Chennai Super Kings; 218/4 (20 overs) | v | Mumbai Indians; 219/6 (20 overs) |
| Ambati Rayudu 72* (27); Kieron Pollard 2/12 (2 overs) | | Kieron Pollard 87* (34); Sam Curran 3/34 (4 overs) |

Mumbai Indians won by 4 wickets
Arun Jaitley Stadium, Delhi
Umpires: KN Ananthapadmanabhan (Ind) and C. K. Nandan (Ind)
Player of the match: Kieron Pollard (Mumbai Indians)

- Mumbai Indians won the toss and elected to field.

Match 30
19 September 2021
19:30 (N)
Scorecard

| Chennai Super Kings; 156/6 (20 overs) | v | Mumbai Indians; 136/8 (20 overs) |
| Ruturaj Gaikwad 88* (58); Adam Milne 2/21 (4 overs) | | Saurabh Tiwary 50* (40); Dwayne Bravo 3/25 (4 overs) |

Chennai Super Kings won by 20 runs
Dubai International Cricket Stadium, Dubai
Umpires: Richard Illingworth (Eng) and Nitin Menon (Ind)
Player of the match: Ruturaj Gaikwad (Chennai Super Kings)

- Chennai Super Kings won the toss and elected to bat.

Match 35
24 September 2021
19:30 (N)
Scorecard

| Royal Challengers Bangalore; 156/6 (20 overs) | v | Chennai Super Kings; 157/4 (18.1 overs) |
| Devdutt Padikkal 70 (50); Dwayne Bravo 3/24 (4 overs) | | Ruturaj Gaikwad 38 (26); Harshal Patel 2/25 (3.1 overs) |

Chennai Super Kings won by 6 wickets
Sharjah Cricket Stadium, Sharjah
Umpires: Anil Chaudhary (Ind) and Nitin Menon (Ind)
Player of the match: Dwayne Bravo (Chennai Super Kings)

- Chennai Super Kings won the toss and elected to field.

Match 38
26 September 2021
15:30 (D/N)
Scorecard

| Kolkata Knight Riders; 171/6 (20 overs) | v | Chennai Super Kings; 172/8 (20 overs) |
| Rahul Tripathi 45 (33); Shardul Thakur 2/20 (4 overs) | | Faf du Plessis 43 (30); Sunil Narine 3/41 (4 overs) |

Chennai Super Kings won by 2 wickets
Sheikh Zayed Cricket Stadium, Abu Dhabi
Umpires: Chris Gaffaney (NZ) and Tapan Sharma (Ind)
Player of the match: Ravindra Jadeja (Chennai Super Kings)

- Kolkata Knight Riders won the toss and elected to bat.

Match 44
30 September 2021
19:30 (N)
Scorecard

| Sunrisers Hyderabad; 134/7 (20 overs) | v | Chennai Super Kings; 139/4 (19.4 overs) |
| Wriddhiman Saha 44 (46); Josh Hazlewood 3/24 (4 overs) | | Ruturaj Gaikwad 45 (38); Jason Holder 3/27 (4 overs) |

Chennai Super Kings won by 6 wickets
Sharjah Cricket Stadium, Sharjah
Umpires: Yeshwant Barde (Ind) and Nitin Menon (Ind)
Player of the match: Josh Hazlewood (Chennai Super Kings)

- Chennai Super Kings won the toss and elected to field.
- Chennai Super Kings qualified for the playoffs and Sunrisers Hyderabad were eliminated as a result of this match.

Match 47
2 October 2021
19:30 (N)
Scorecard

| Chennai Super Kings; 189/4 (20 overs) | v | Rajasthan Royals; 190/3 (17.3 overs) |
| Ruturaj Gaikwad 101* (60); Rahul Tewatia 3/39 (4 overs) | | Shivam Dube 64* (42); Shardul Thakur 2/30 (4 overs) |

Rajasthan Royals won by 7 wickets
Sheikh Zayed Cricket Stadium, Abu Dhabi
Umpires: Chris Gaffaney (NZ) and Virender Sharma (Ind)
Player of the match: Ruturaj Gaikwad (Chennai Super Kings)

- Rajasthan Royals won the toss and elected to field.

Match 50
4 October 2021
19:30 (N)
Scorecard

| Chennai Super Kings; 136/5 (20 overs) | v | Delhi Capitals; 139/7 (19.4 overs) |
| Ambati Rayudu 55* (55); Axar Patel 2/18 (4 overs) | | Shikhar Dhawan 39 (35); Shardul Thakur 2/13 (4 overs) |

Delhi Capitals won by 3 wickets
Dubai International Cricket Stadium, Dubai
Umpires: Anil Chaudhary (Ind) and Nitin Menon (Ind)
Player of the match: Axar Patel (Delhi Capitals)

- Delhi Capitals won the toss and elected to field.

Match 53
7 October 2021
15:30 (D/N)
Scorecard

| Chennai Super Kings; 134/6 (20 overs) | v | Punjab Kings; 139/4 (13 overs) |
| Faf du Plessis 76 (55); Chris Jordan 2/20 (3 overs) | | KL Rahul 98* (42); Shardul Thakur 3/28 (3 overs) |

Punjab Kings won by 6 wickets
Dubai International Cricket Stadium, Dubai
Umpires: Richard Illingworth (Eng) and Krishnamachari Srinivasan (Ind)
Player of the match: KL Rahul (Punjab Kings)

- Punjab Kings won the toss and elected to field.
- Delhi Capitals advanced to Qualifier 1 as a result of this match.

== Playoffs ==
Qualifier 1

10 October 2021
19:30 (N)
Scorecard

| Delhi Capitals; 172/5 (20 overs) | v | Chennai Super Kings; 173/6 (19.4 overs) |
| Prithvi Shaw 60 (34); Josh Hazlewood 2/29 (4 overs) | | Ruturaj Gaikwad 70 (50); Tom Curran 3/29 (3.4 overs) |

Chennai Super Kings won by 4 wickets
Dubai International Cricket Stadium, Dubai
Umpires: Richard Illingworth (Eng) and Nitin Menon (Ind)
Player of the match: Ruturaj Gaikwad (Chennai Super Kings)

- Chennai Super Kings won the toss and elected to field.

=== Final ===
15 October 2021
19:30 (N)
Scorecard

| Chennai Super Kings; 192/3 (20 overs) | v | Kolkata Knight Riders; 165/9 (20 overs) |
| Faf du Plessis 86 (59); Sunil Narine 2/26 (4 overs) | | Shubman Gill 51 (43); Shardul Thakur 3/38 (4 overs) |

Chennai Super Kings won by 27 runs
Dubai International Cricket Stadium, Dubai
Umpires: Richard Illingworth (Eng) and Nitin Menon (Ind)
Player of the match: Faf du Plessis (Chennai Super Kings)

- Kolkata Knight Riders won the toss and elected to field.

== Statistics ==
=== Most runs ===
| No. | Name | Match | Inns | NO | Runs | HS | Ave. | BF | SR | 100s | 50s | 0 | 4s | 6s |
|---|---|---|---|---|---|---|---|---|---|---|---|---|---|---|
| 1 | Ruturaj Gaikwad | 16 | 16 | 2 | 635 | 101* | 45.35 | 466 | 136.26 | 1 | 4 | 0 | 64 | 23 |
| 2 | Faf du Plessis | 16 | 16 | 2 | 633 | 95* | 45.21 | 458 | 138.20 | 0 | 6 | 2 | 60 | 23 |
| 3 | Moeen Ali | 15 | 15 | 1 | 357 | 58 | 25.50 | 260 | 137.30 | 0 | 1 | 2 | 31 | 19 |
| 4 | Ambati Rayudu | 16 | 13 | 4 | 257 | 72* | 28.55 | 170 | 151.17 | 0 | 2 | 1 | 16 | 17 |
| 5 | Ravindra Jadeja | 16 | 12 | 9 | 227 | 62* | 75.66 | 156 | 145.51 | 0 | 1 | 0 | 19 | 9 |

- Ruturaj Gaikwad won the Orange Cap award as the player who scored the highest number of runs in the tournament
- Source: Cricinfo

=== Most wickets ===
| No. | Name | Match | Inns | Overs | Maidens | Runs | Wickets | BBI | Ave. | Econ. | SR | 4W | 5W |
|---|---|---|---|---|---|---|---|---|---|---|---|---|---|
| 1 | Shardul Thakur | 16 | 16 | 59.5 | 1 | 527 | 21 | 3/28 | 25.09 | 8.80 | 17.0 | 0 | 0 |
| 2 | Dwayne Bravo | 11 | 11 | 33.4 | 0 | 263 | 14 | 3/24 | 18.78 | 7.81 | 14.4 | 0 | 0 |
| 3 | Deepak Chahar | 15 | 15 | 54.0 | 1 | 451 | 14 | 4/13 | 32.21 | 8.35 | 23.1 | 2 | 0 |
| 4 | Ravindra Jadeja | 16 | 16 | 49.0 | 1 | 346 | 13 | 3/13 | 26.61 | 7.06 | 22.6 | 0 | 0 |
| 5 | Josh Hazlewood | 9 | 9 | 35.0 | 0 | 293 | 11 | 3/24 | 26.63 | 8.37 | 19.0 | 0 | 0 |

- Source: ESPNcricinfo

== Awards and achievements ==
The following players won player of the match awards whilst playing for the team:

| No. | Date | Player | Opponent | Result | Contribution | Ref. |
|---|---|---|---|---|---|---|
| 1 | 16 April 2021 | Deepak Chahar | Punjab Kings | Won by 6 wickets | 4/13 (4 overs) | |
| 2 | 19 April 2021 | Moeen Ali | Rajasthan Royals | Won by 45 runs | 3/7 (3 overs) | |
| 3 | 21 April 2021 | Faf du Plessis | Kolkata Knight Riders | Won by 18 runs | 95* (60) | |
| 4 | 25 April 2021 | Ravindra Jadeja | Royal Challengers Bangalore | Won by 69 runs | 62* (28) and 3/13 (4 overs) | |
| 5 | 28 April 2021 | Ruturaj Gaikwad | Sunrisers Hyderabad | Won by 7 wickets | 75 (44) | |
| 6 | 19 September 2021 | Ruturaj Gaikwad | Mumbai Indians | Won by 20 runs | 88* (58) | |
| 7 | 24 September 2021 | Dwayne Bravo | Royal Challengers Bangalore | Won by 6 wickets | 3/24 (4 overs) | |
| 8 | 26 September 2021 | Ravindra Jadeja | Kolkata Knight Riders | Won by 2 wickets | 1/21 (4 overs) and 22 (8) | |
| 9 | 30 September 2021 | Josh Hazlewood | Sunrisers Hyderabad | Won by 6 wickets | 3/24 (4 overs) | |
| 10 | 2 October 2021 | Ruturaj Gaikwad | Rajasthan Royals | Lost by 7 wickets | 101* (60) | |
| 11 | 10 October 2021 – Qualifier 1 | Ruturaj Gaikwad | Delhi Capitals | Won by 4 wickets and advanced to the Finals | 70 (50) | |
| 12 | 15 October 2021 – Final | Faf du Plessis | Kolkata Knight Riders | Won by 27 runs and won the title | 86 (59) | |
