= 2021 Delhi Capitals season =

Delhi based franchise cricket team

Delhi Capitals
2021 season
- Coach: Ricky Ponting
- Captain: Rishabh Pant
- Tournament performance: Qualifier 2 (3rd)
- Most runs: Shikhar Dhawan (587)
- Most wickets: Avesh Khan (24)

Delhi Capitals are a Twenty20 franchise cricket team based in Delhi, India. The team competed in the 2021 Indian Premier League. Founded in 2008 as the Delhi Daredevils, the franchise is owned by the GMR Group and the JSW Group. The team's home ground is Arun Jaitley Stadium, located in New Delhi.

== Background ==
=== Player retention and transfers ===
The Delhi Capitals retained 18 players and released seven players.

Retained Players: Shreyas Iyer, Ajinkya Rahane, Amit Mishra, Avesh Khan, Axar Patel, Ishant Sharma, Kagiso Rabada, Prithvi Shaw, Ravichandran Ashwin, Rishabh Pant, Shikhar Dhawan, Shimron Hetmyer, Marcus Stoinis, Lalit Yadav, Anrich Nortje, Pravin Dubey, Chris Woakes.

Released Players: Harshal Patel, Alex Carey, Keemo Paul, Tushar Deshpande, Sandeep Lamichhane, Mohit Sharma, Jason Roy, Daniel Sams.

Added Players: Steve Smith, Manimaran Siddharth, Tom Curran, Umesh Yadav, Lukman Meriwala, Vishnu Vinod, Ripal Patel, Sam Billings

Supportive Players : Aniruddha Joshi, Shams Mulani

== Squad ==
- Players with international caps are listed in **bold**.

No.	Name	Nationality	Birth date	Batting style	Bowling style	Year signed	Salary	Notes
Batsmen
3	**Ajinkya Rahane**	India	5 June 1988 (aged 32)	Right-handed	Right-arm medium	2020	₹4 crore (US$419,000)	
28	Ripal Patel	India	28 September 1995 (aged 25)	Right-handed	Right-arm medium-fast	2021	₹20 lakh (US$21,000)	
41	**Shreyas Iyer**	India	6 December 1994 (aged 26)	Right-handed		2018	₹7 crore (US$730,000)	
42	**Shikhar Dhawan**	India	5 December 1985 (aged 35)	Left-handed	Right-arm off break	2019	₹5.2 crore (US$540,000)	Vice Captain
49	**Steve Smith**	Australia	2 June 1989 (aged 31)	Right-handed	Right-arm leg-spin	2021	₹2.2 crore (US$230,000)	Overseas Captain
82	Aniruddha Joshi	India	7 November 1987 (aged 33)	Right-handed	Right-arm off break	2021	₹20 lakh (US$21,000)	Short-term replacement for Shreyas Iyer
100	**Prithvi Shaw**	India	9 November 1999 (aged 21)	Right-handed	Right-arm off break	2018	₹1.2 crore (US$130,000)	
189	**Shimron Hetmyer**	Guyana	26 December 1996 (aged 24)	Left-handed	Right-arm leg break	2020	₹7.75 crore (US$810,000)	Overseas
All-rounders
16	Lalit Yadav	India	3 January 1997 (aged 24)	Right-handed	Right-arm off break	2020	₹20 lakh (US$21,000)	
19	**Chris Woakes**	England	2 March 1989 (aged 32)	Right-handed	Right-arm fast-medium	2020	₹1.5 crore (US$160,000)	Overseas; Pulled out due to bubble fatigue
20	**Axar Patel**	India	20 January 1994 (aged 27)	Left-handed	Left-arm orthodox	2019	₹5 crore (US$520,000)	
21	**Marcus Stoinis**	Australia	16 August 1989 (aged 31)	Right-handed	Right-arm medium	2020	₹4.8 crore (US$500,000)	Overseas; Calf Injury
59	**Tom Curran**	England	12 March 1995 (aged 26)	Right-handed	Right-arm fast-medium	2021	₹5.25 crore (US$550,000)	Overseas
—N/a	Shams Mulani	India	13 March 1997 (aged 24)	Left-handed	Left-arm orthodox	2021	₹20 lakh (US$21,000)	Short-term replacement for Axar Patel
Wicket-keepers
4	Vishnu Vinod	India	2 December 1993 (aged 27)	Right-handed		2021	₹20 lakh (US$21,000)	
7	**Sam Billings**	England	15 June 1991 (aged 29)	Right-handed		2021	₹2 crore (US$210,000)	Overseas
17	**Rishabh Pant**	India	4 October 1997 (aged 23)	Left-handed		2018	₹15 crore (US$1.6 million)	
Spin Bowlers
23	**Ravichandran Ashwin**	India	17 September 1986 (aged 34)	Right-handed	Right-arm off break	2020	₹7.6 crore (US$800,000)	
46	Pravin Dubey	India	1 July 1993 (aged 27)	Right-handed	Right-arm leg break	2020	₹20 lakh (US$21,000)	
99	**Amit Mishra**	India	24 November 1982 (aged 38)	Right-handed	Right-arm leg break	2018	₹4 crore (US$420,000)	
30	Manimaran Siddharth	India	3 July 1998 (aged 22)	Right-handed	Left-arm orthodox	2021	₹20 lakh (US$21,000)	
Pace Bowlers
02	**Anrich Nortje**	South Africa	16 November 1993 (aged 27)	Right-handed	Right-arm fast	2020	₹50 lakh (US$52,000)	Overseas
6	Avesh Khan	India	13 December 1996 (aged 24)	Right-handed	Right-arm fast-medium	2018	₹70 lakh (US$73,000)	
10	**Umesh Yadav**	India	25 October 1987 (aged 33)	Right-handed	Right-arm fast	2021	₹1 crore (US$100,000)	
18	Lukman Meriwala	India	11 December 1991 (aged 29)	Left-handed	Left-arm fast-medium	2021	₹20 lakh (US$21,000)	
25	**Kagiso Rabada**	South Africa	25 May 1995 (aged 25)	Left-handed	Right-arm fast	2018	₹4.2 crore (US$440,000)	Overseas
97	**Ishant Sharma**	India	2 September 1988 (aged 32)	Right-handed	Right-arm fast-medium	2020	₹1.1 crore (US$120,000)	
N/A	Kulwant Khejroliya	India	13 March 1992 (aged 29)	Left-handed	Left-arm fast-medium	2021	₹20 lakh (US$21,000)	
N/A	Ben Dwarshuis	Australia	23 June 1994 (aged 26)	Left-handed	Left-arm fast-medium	2021	₹30 lakh (US$31,000)	Overseas
Source:DC Players

== Administration and support staff ==
Position	Name
Owner	Kiran Kumar Grandhi (GMR Group), Parth Jindal (JSW Group)
CEO	Vinod Bisht
Team manager	Siddharth Bhasin
Head coach	Ricky Ponting
Batting coach	Pravin Amre
Bowling coach	James Hopes
Fielding coach	Mohammad Kaif
Assistant coach	Ajay Ratra
Physiotherapist	Patrick Farhart
Strength and conditioning coach	Rajinikanth Sivagnanam
Team doctor	Dr. Rizwan Khan
Source:DC Staff

== Kit manufacturers and sponsors ==
Kit manufacturer	Shirt sponsor (chest)	Shirt sponsor (back)	Chest Branding
Wrogn Active	JSW Group	EbixCash	APL Apollo Steel Tubes
Source : delhicapitals.in

T20 uniform

== Teams and standings ==
=== Results by match ===
Round	1	2	3	4	5	6	7	8	9	10	11	12	13	14
Result	W	L	W	W	W	L	W	W	W	W	L	W	W	L
Position	1	4	2	2	2	3	2	1	1	1	2	2	1	1

Source: Fixtures
W = Win; L = Loss; NR = No Result

Pos	Team	Pld	W	L	NR	Pts	NRR	
1	Delhi Capitals (3rd)	14	10	4	0	20	0.481	Advanced to Qualifier 1
2	Chennai Super Kings (C)	14	9	5	0	18	0.455	Advanced to Qualifier 1
3	Royal Challengers Bangalore (4th)	14	9	5	0	18	−0.140	Advanced to the Eliminator
4	Kolkata Knight Riders (R)	14	7	7	0	14	0.587	Advanced to the Eliminator
5	Mumbai Indians	14	7	7	0	14	0.116	
6	Punjab Kings	14	6	8	0	12	−0.001	
7	Rajasthan Royals	14	5	9	0	10	−0.993	
8	Sunrisers Hyderabad	14	3	11	0	6	−0.545	

Source: ESPNcricinfo
(C) Champions; (R) Runners-up
The four top-ranked teams qualified for the playoffs.

== League stage ==
The full schedule was published on the IPL website on 7 March 2021.

=== Matches ===
Match 2
10 April 2021
19:30 (N)
Scorecard

Chennai Super Kings; 188/7 (20 overs)	v	Delhi Capitals; 190/3 (18.4 overs)
Suresh Raina 54 (36); Chris Woakes 2/18 (3 overs)		Shikhar Dhawan 85 (54); Shardul Thakur 2/53 (3.4 overs)

Delhi Capitals won by 7 wickets
Wankhede Stadium, Mumbai
Umpires: Anil Chaudhary (Ind) and Virender Sharma (Ind)
Player of the match: Shikhar Dhawan (Delhi Capitals)

- Delhi Capitals won the toss and elected to field.

Match 7
15 April 2021
19:30 (N)
Scorecard

Delhi Capitals; 147/8 (20 overs)	v	Rajasthan Royals; 150/7 (19.4 overs)
Rishabh Pant 51 (32); Jaydev Unadkat 3/15 (4 overs)		David Miller 62 (43); Avesh Khan 3/32 (4 overs)

Rajasthan Royals won by 3 wickets
Wankhede Stadium, Mumbai
Umpires: Sundaram Ravi (Ind) and Virender Sharma (Ind)
Player of the match: Jaydev Unadkat (Rajasthan Royals)

- Rajasthan Royals won the toss and elected to field.

Match 11
18 April 2021
19:30 (N)
Scorecard

Punjab Kings; 195/4 (20 overs)	v	Delhi Capitals; 198/4 (18.2 overs)
Mayank Agarwal 69 (36); Lukman Meriwala 1/32 (3 overs)		Shikhar Dhawan 92 (49); Jhye Richardson 2/41 (4 overs)

Delhi Capitals won by 6 wickets
Wankhede Stadium, Mumbai
Umpires: Anil Chaudhary (Ind) and Paul Reiffel (Aus)
Player of the match: Shikhar Dhawan (Delhi Capitals)

- Delhi Capitals won the toss and elected to field.

Match 13
20 April 2021
19:30 (N)
Scorecard

Mumbai Indians; 137/9 (20 overs)	v	Delhi Capitals; 138/4 (19.1 overs)
Rohit Sharma 44 (30); Amit Mishra 4/24 (4 overs)		Shikhar Dhawan 45 (42); Kieron Pollard 1/9 (1.1 overs)

Delhi Capitals won by 6 wickets
M. A. Chidambaram Stadium, Chennai
Umpires: Chris Gaffaney (NZ) and Chettithody Shamshuddin (Ind)
Player of the match: Amit Mishra (Delhi Capitals)

- Mumbai Indians won the toss and elected to bat.

Match 20
25 April 2021
19:30 (N)
Scorecard

Delhi Capitals; 159/4 (20 overs)	v	Sunrisers Hyderabad; 159/7 (20 overs)
Prithvi Shaw 53 (39); Siddarth Kaul 2/31 (4 overs)		Kane Williamson 66* (51); Avesh Khan 3/34 (4 overs)

Match tied
(Delhi Capitals won the Super Over)
M. A. Chidambaram Stadium, Chennai
Umpires: K. N. Ananthapadmanabhan (Ind) and Chris Gaffaney (NZ)
Player of the match: Prithvi Shaw (Delhi Capitals)

- Delhi Capitals won the toss and elected to bat.
- Super Over: Sunrisers Hyderabad 7/0 (1 over), Delhi Capitals 8/0 (1 over)

Match 22
27 April 2021
19:30 (N)
Scorecard

Royal Challengers Bangalore; 171/5 (20 overs)	v	Delhi Capitals; 170/4 (20 overs)
AB de Villiers 75* (42); Avesh Khan 1/24 (4 overs)		Rishabh Pant 58* (48); Harshal Patel 2/37 (4 overs)

Royal Challengers Bangalore won by 1 run
Narendra Modi Stadium, Ahmedabad
Umpires: Sundaram Ravi (Ind) and Virender Sharma (Ind)
Player of the match: AB de Villiers (Royal Challengers Bangalore)

- Delhi Capitals won the toss and elected to field.
- AB de Villiers (Royal Challengers Bangalore) became the sixth player, and the second overseas one, to score 5,000 runs in the IPL.

Match 25
29 April 2021
19:30 (N)
Scorecard

Kolkata Knight Riders; 154/6 (20 overs)	v	Delhi Capitals; 156/3 (16.3 overs)
Andre Russell 45* (27); Lalit Yadav 2/13 (3 overs)		Prithvi Shaw 82 (41); Pat Cummins 3/24 (4 overs)

Delhi Capitals won by 7 wickets
Narendra Modi Stadium, Ahmedabad
Umpires: Yeshwant Barde (Ind) and Anil Chaudhary (Ind)
Player of the match: Prithvi Shaw (Delhi Capitals)

- Delhi Capitals won the toss and elected to field.

Match 29
2 May 2021
19:30 (N)
Scorecard

Punjab Kings; 166/6 (20 overs)	v	Delhi Capitals; 167/3 (17.4 overs)
Mayank Agarwal 99* (58); Kagiso Rabada 3/36 (4 overs)		Shikhar Dhawan 69* (47); Harpreet Brar 1/19 (3 overs)

Delhi Capitals won by 7 wickets
Narendra Modi Stadium, Ahmedabad
Umpires: Anil Chaudhary (Ind) and Anil Dandekar (Ind)
Player of the match: Mayank Agarwal (Punjab Kings)

- Delhi Capitals won the toss and elected to field.

Match 33
22 September 2021
19:30 (N)
Scorecard

Sunrisers Hyderabad; 134/9 (20 overs)	v	Delhi Capitals; 139/2 (17.5 overs)
Abdul Samad 28 (21); Kagiso Rabada 3/37 (4 overs)		Shreyas Iyer 47* (41); Rashid Khan 1/26 (4 overs)

Delhi Capitals won by 8 wickets
Dubai International Cricket Stadium, Dubai
Umpires: K. N. Ananthapadmanabhan (Ind) and Richard Illingworth (Eng)
Player of the match: Anrich Nortje (Delhi Capitals)

- Sunrisers Hyderabad won the toss and elected to bat.

Match 36
25 September 2021
15:30 (D/N)
Scorecard

Delhi Capitals; 154/6 (20 overs)	v	Rajasthan Royals; 121/6 (20 overs)
Shreyas Iyer 43 (32); Mustafizur Rahman 2/22 (4 overs)		Sanju Samson 70* (53); Anrich Nortje 2/18 (4 overs)

Delhi Capitals won by 33 runs
Sheikh Zayed Cricket Stadium, Abu Dhabi
Umpires: Chris Gaffaney (NZ) and Ulhas Gandhe (Ind)
Player of the match: Shreyas Iyer (Delhi Capitals)

- Rajasthan Royals won the toss and elected to field.

Match 41
28 September 2021
15:30 (D/N)
Scorecard

Delhi Capitals; 127/9 (20 overs)	v	Kolkata Knight Riders; 130/7 (18.2 overs)
Steve Smith 39 (34); Lockie Ferguson 2/10 (2 overs)		Nitish Rana 36* (27); Avesh Khan 3/13 (3 overs)

Kolkata Knight Riders won by 3 wickets
Sharjah Cricket Stadium, Sharjah
Umpires: Saiyed Khalid (Ind) and Nitin Menon (Ind)
Player of the match: Sunil Narine (Kolkata Knight Riders)

- Kolkata Knight Riders won the toss and elected to field.

Match 46
2 October 2021
15:30 (D/N)
Scorecard

Mumbai Indians; 129/8 (20 overs)	v	Delhi Capitals; 132/6 (19.1 overs)
Suryakumar Yadav 33 (26); Avesh Khan 3/15 (4 overs)		Shreyas Iyer 33* (33); Krunal Pandya 1/18 (2.1 overs)

Delhi Capitals won by 4 wickets
Sharjah Cricket Stadium, Sharjah
Umpires: Anil Chaudhary (Ind) and Michael Gough (Eng)
Player of the match: Axar Patel (Delhi Capitals)

- Delhi Capitals won the toss and elected to field.

Match 50
4 October 2021
19:30 (N)
Scorecard

Chennai Super Kings; 136/5 (20 overs)	v	Delhi Capitals; 139/7 (19.4 overs)
Ambati Rayudu 55* (55); Axar Patel 2/18 (4 overs)		Shikhar Dhawan 39 (35); Shardul Thakur 2/13 (4 overs)

Delhi Capitals won by 3 wickets
Dubai International Cricket Stadium, Dubai
Umpires: Anil Chaudhary (Ind) and Nitin Menon (Ind)
Player of the match: Axar Patel (Delhi Capitals)

- Delhi Capitals won the toss and elected to field.

Match 56
8 October 2021
19:30 (N)
Scorecard

Delhi Capitals; 164/5 (20 overs)	v	Royal Challengers Bangalore; 166/3 (20 overs)
Prithvi Shaw 48 (31); Mohammed Siraj 2/25 (4 overs)		K. S. Bharat 78* (52); Anrich Nortje 2/24 (4 overs)

Royal Challengers Bangalore won by 7 wickets
Dubai International Cricket Stadium, Dubai
Umpires: K. N. Ananthapadmanabhan (Ind) and Nitin Menon (Ind)
Player of the match: K. S. Bharat (Royal Challengers Bangalore)

- Royal Challengers Bangalore won the toss and elected to field.
- Chennai Super Kings advanced to Qualifier 1 having a better net run rate than the Royal Challengers Bangalore.

== Playoffs ==
Qualifier 1

10 October 2021
19:30 (N)
Scorecard

Delhi Capitals; 172/5 (20 overs)	v	Chennai Super Kings; 173/6 (19.4 overs)
Prithvi Shaw 60 (34); Josh Hazlewood 2/29 (4 overs)		Ruturaj Gaikwad 70 (50); Tom Curran 3/29 (3.4 overs)

Chennai Super Kings won by 4 wickets
Dubai International Cricket Stadium, Dubai
Umpires: Richard Illingworth (Eng) and Nitin Menon (Ind)
Player of the match: Ruturaj Gaikwad (Chennai Super Kings)

- Chennai Super Kings won the toss and elected to field.

Qualifier 2

13 October 2021
19:30 (N)
Scorecard

Delhi Capitals; 135/5 (20 overs)	v	Kolkata Knight Riders; 136/7 (19.5 overs)
Shikhar Dhawan 36 (39); Varun Chakaravarthy 2/26 (4 overs)		Venkatesh Iyer 55 (41); Kagiso Rabada 2/23 (4 overs)

Kolkata Knight Riders won by 3 wickets
Sharjah Cricket Stadium, Sharjah
Umpires: K. N. Ananthapadmanabhan (Ind) and Michael Gough (Eng)
Player of the match: Venkatesh Iyer (Kolkata Knight Riders)

- Kolkata Knight Riders won the toss and elected to field.

== Statistics ==
=== Most runs ===
No.	Name	Matches	Inns	NO	Runs	HS	Ave.	BF	SR	100s	50s	0s	4s	6s
1	Shikhar Dhawan	16	16	1	587	92	39.13	471	124.62	0	3	0	63	16
2	Prithvi Shaw	15	15	0	479	82	31.93	301	159.13	0	4	0	56	18
3	Rishabh Pant	16	16	4	419	58*	34.91	326	128.52	0	3	0	42	10
4	Shimron Hetmyer	14	13	6	242	53*	34.57	144	168.05	0	1	0	19	12
5	Shreyas Iyer	8	8	3	175	47*	35.00	171	102.33	0	0	0	7	5

- Source: ESPNcricinfo

=== Most wickets ===
No.	Name	Matches	Inns	Overs	Maidens	Runs	Wickets	BBI	Ave.	Econ.	SR	4W	5W
1	Avesh Khan	16	16	61.0	0	450	24	3/13	18.75	7.37	15.25	0	0
2	Axar Patel	12	12	46.0	0	306	15	3/21	20.40	6.65	18.40	0	0
3	Kagiso Rabada	15	15	56.0	1	456	15	3/36	30.40	8.14	22.40	0	0
4	Anrich Nortje	8	8	30.2	1	187	12	2/12	15.58	6.16	15.16	0	0
5	Ravichandran Ashwin	13	13	44.4	0	331	7	2/27	47.28	7.41	38.28	0	0

- Source: ESPNcricinfo

== Awards and achievements ==
=== Man of the Match ===
No.	Date	Player	Opponent	Result	Contribution	Ref.
1	10 April 2021	Shikhar Dhawan	Chennai Super Kings	Won by 7 wickets	85 (54)	
2	18 April 2021	Shikhar Dhawan	Punjab Kings	Won by 6 wickets	92 (49)	
3	20 April 2021	Amit Mishra	Mumbai Indians	Won by 6 wickets	4/24 (4 overs)	
4	25 April 2021	Prithvi Shaw	Sunrisers Hyderabad	Match tied (Won the super over)	53 (39)	
5	29 April 2021	Prithvi Shaw	Kolkata Knight Riders	Won by 7 wickets	82 (41)	
6	22 September 2021	Anrich Nortje	Sunrisers Hyderabad	Won by 8 wickets	2/12 (4 overs)	
7	25 September 2021	Shreyas Iyer	Rajasthan Royals	Won by 33 runs	43 (32)	
8	2 October 2021	Axar Patel	Mumbai Indians	Won by 4 wickets	3/21 (4 overs)	
9	4 October 2021	Axar Patel	Chennai Super Kings	Won by 3 wickets	2/18 (4 overs)	
