= 2021 Royal Challengers Bangalore season =

Indian Premier League cricket team season

Royal Challengers Bangalore
2021 season
- Coach: Simon Katich; Mike Hesson
- Captain: Virat Kohli
- Ground(s): M. Chinnaswamy Stadium, Bengaluru
- League stage: 3rd
- Eliminator: Lost
- Most runs: Glenn Maxwell (513)
- Most wickets: Harshal Patel (32)

The 2021 season was the 14th season for the IPL cricket franchise Royal Challengers Bangalore. They were one of the eight teams competed in the tournament. The team was captained by Virat Kohli with Mike Hesson as a team coach. After qualifying for the playoffs, they were eliminated from the tournament as they were beaten by Kolkata Knight Riders in the Eliminator match.

This was the last season in IPL for AB de Villiers who announced his retirement on 19 November 2021.

== Background ==
=== Player retention and transfers ===
The Royal Challengers Bangalore retained 12 players and released ten players.

Retained Players: Virat Kohli (C), AB de Villiers (VC), Devdutt Padikkal, Mohammed Siraj, Navdeep Saini, Washington Sundar, Yuzvendra Chahal, Josh Philippe, Pavan Deshpande, Shahbaz Ahmed, Adam Zampa, Kane Richardson, Daniel Sams, Harshal Patel

Released Players: Chris Morris, Aaron Finch, Moeen Ali, Isuru Udana, Dale Steyn, Shivam Dube, Umesh Yadav, Pawan Negi, Gurkeerat Mann, Parthiv Patel (retired).

Added Players: Glenn Maxwell, Mohammed Azharuddeen, Sachin Baby, Kyle Jamieson, Srikar Bharat, Rajat Patidar, Dan Christian, Suyash Prabhudessai, Finn Allen

== Squad ==
- Players with international caps are listed in **bold**.

| No. | Name | Nationality | Birth date | Batting style | Bowling style | Year signed | Salary | Notes |
Batters
| 8 | Tim David | Singapore | 16 March 1996 (aged 25) | Right-handed | Right-arm off break | 2021 | ₹20 lakh (US$21,000) | Overseas |
| 11 | Sachin Baby | India | 18 December 1988 (aged 32) | Left-handed | Right-arm off break | 2021 | ₹20 lakh (US$21,000) | |
| 18 | **Virat Kohli** | India | 5 November 1988 (aged 32) | Right-handed | Right-arm medium | 2008 | ₹17 crore (US$1.8 million) | Captain |
| 19 | Rajat Patidar | India | 1 June 1993 (aged 27) | Right-handed | Right-arm off break | 2021 | ₹20 lakh (US$21,000) | |
| 37 | **Devdutt Padikkal** | India | 7 July 2000 (aged 20) | Left-handed | Right-arm off break | 2019 | ₹20 lakh (US$21,000) | |
| —N/a | Suyash Prabhudessai | India | 6 December 1997 (aged 23) | Right-handed | Right-arm fast-medium | 2021 | ₹20 lakh (US$21,000) | |
All-rounders
| 5 | **Washington Sundar** | India | 5 October 1999 (aged 21) | Left-handed | Right-arm off break | 2018 | ₹3.2 crore (US$332,000) | Unavailable due to finger injury |
| 21 | Shahbaz Ahmed | India | 12 December 1994 (aged 26) | Left-handed | Slow left-arm orthodox | 2020 | ₹20 lakh (US$21,000) | |
| 32 | **Glenn Maxwell** | Australia | 14 October 1988 (aged 32) | Right-handed | Right-arm off break | 2021 | ₹14.25 crore (US$1.5 million) | Overseas |
| 49 | **Wanindu Hasaranga** | Sri Lanka | 27 July 1997 (aged 23) | Right-handed | Right-arm leg break | 2021 | ₹50 lakh (US$52,000) | Overseas |
| 54 | **Dan Christian** | Australia | 4 May 1983 (aged 37) | Right-handed | Right-arm fast-medium | 2021 | ₹4.8 crore (US$498,444.00) | Overseas |
| 95 | **Daniel Sams** | Australia | 27 October 1992 (aged 28) | Right-handed | Left-arm fast-medium | 2021 | ₹20 lakh (US$21,000) | Overseas |
| —N/a | Pavan Deshpande | India | 16 September 1989 (aged 31) | Left-handed | Right-arm off break | 2020 | ₹20 lakh (US$21,000) | |
Wicket-keepers
| 1 | **Josh Philippe** | Australia | 1 June 1997 (aged 23) | Right-handed | | 2020 | ₹20 lakh (US$21,000) | Overseas |
| 15 | K. S. Bharat | India | 3 October 1993 (aged 27) | Right-handed | Right-arm off break | 2021 | ₹20 lakh (US$21,000) | |
| 17 | **AB de Villiers** | South Africa | 17 February 1984 (aged 37) | Right-handed | Right-arm medium | 2018 | ₹11 crore (US$1.1 million) | Overseas, Vice-captain |
| —N/a | Mohammed Azharuddeen | India | 22 March 1994 (aged 27) | Right-handed | | 2021 | ₹20 lakh (US$21,000) | |
| —N/a | **Finn Allen** | New Zealand | 22 April 1999 (aged 21) | Right-handed | Right-arm off break | 2021 | ₹20 lakh (US$21,000) | Overseas, Replacement for Josh Philippe |
Spin Bowlers
| 3 | **Yuzvendra Chahal** | India | 23 July 1990 (aged 30) | Right-handed | Right-arm leg break | 2018 | ₹6 crore (US$623,000) | |
| 63 | **Adam Zampa** | Australia | 31 March 1992 (aged 29) | Right-handed | Right-arm leg break | 2020 | ₹1.5 crore (US$156,000) | Overseas, Unavailable for personal reasons. |
Pace Bowlers
| 9 | Harshal Patel | India | 23 November 1990 (aged 30) | Right-handed | Right-arm medium-fast | 2021 | ₹20 lakh (US$21,000) | |
| 12 | **Kyle Jamieson** | New Zealand | 30 December 1994 (aged 26) | Right-handed | Right-arm Fast | 2021 | ₹15 crore (US$1.6 million) | Overseas |
| 27 | George Garton | England | 15 April 1997 (aged 23) | Left-handed | Left-arm Fast | 2021 | ₹20 lakh (US$21,000) | Overseas, Replacement for Kane Richardson |
| 47 | **Kane Richardson** | Australia | 12 February 1991 (aged 30) | Right-handed | Right-arm fast-medium | 2020 | ₹4 crore (US$415,000) | Overseas, Unavailable for personal reasons. |
| 73 | **Mohammed Siraj** | India | 13 March 1994 (aged 27) | Right-handed | Right-arm fast-medium | 2018 | ₹2.6 crore (US$270,000) | |
| 96 | **Navdeep Saini** | India | 23 November 1992 (aged 28) | Right-handed | Right-arm fast | 2018 | ₹3 crore (US$312,000) | |
| —N/a | **Scott Kuggeleijn** | New Zealand | 3 January 1992 (aged 29) | Right-handed | Right-arm fast-medium | 2021 | ₹50 lakh (US$52,000) | Overseas, Unavailable due to national duty |
| —N/a | **Dushmantha Chameera** | Sri Lanka | 11 January 1992 (aged 29) | Right-handed | Right-arm fast | 2021 | ₹50 lakh (US$52,000) | Overseas |
| —N/a | Akash Deep | India | 15 December 1996 (aged 24) | Right-handed | Right-arm medium | 2021 | ₹20 lakh (US$21,000) | Replacement for Washington Sundar |
Source: RCB Players

== Administration and support staff ==
| Position | Name |
|---|---|
| Owner | United Spirits Limited |
| Chairman | Prathmesh Mishra |
| Vice President and Head | Rajesh Menon |
| Team manager | Soumyadeep Pyne |
| Director of cricket operations & head coach | Mike Hesson |
| Batting consultant | Sanjay Bangar |
| Batting and spin bowling coach | Sridharan Sriram |
| Bowling coach | Adam Griffith |
| Head of scouting and fielding coach | Malolan Rangarajan |
| Head physiotherapist | Evan Speechly |
| Strength and conditioning coach | Basu Shanker |
| Team doctor | Dr. Charles Minz |
Source: RCB Staff

== Kit manufacturers and sponsors ==
| Kit manufacturer | Shirt sponsor (chest) | Shirt sponsor (back) | Shirt sponsor (chest) |
|---|---|---|---|
| Puma | Muthoot Fincorp | DP World | Exide |
Source : royalchallengers.com

Home kit

== Teams and standings ==
=== Results by match ===
| Round | 1 | 2 | 3 | 4 | 5 | 6 | 7 | 8 | 9 | 10 | 11 | 12 | 13 | 14 |
|---|---|---|---|---|---|---|---|---|---|---|---|---|---|---|
| Result | W | W | W | W | L | W | L | L | L | W | W | W | L | W |
| Position | 1 | 1 | 1 | 1 | 2 | 1 | 3 | 3 | 3 | 3 | 3 | 3 | 3 | 3 |

Source: Fixtures
W = Win; L = Loss; NR = No Result

| Pos | Team | Pld | W | L | NR | Pts | NRR | |
|---|---|---|---|---|---|---|---|---|
| 1 | Delhi Capitals (3rd) | 14 | 10 | 4 | 0 | 20 | 0.481 | Advanced to Qualifier 1 |
| 2 | Chennai Super Kings (C) | 14 | 9 | 5 | 0 | 18 | 0.455 | Advanced to Qualifier 1 |
| 3 | Royal Challengers Bangalore (4th) | 14 | 9 | 5 | 0 | 18 | −0.140 | Advanced to the Eliminator |
| 4 | Kolkata Knight Riders (R) | 14 | 7 | 7 | 0 | 14 | 0.587 | Advanced to the Eliminator |
| 5 | Mumbai Indians | 14 | 7 | 7 | 0 | 14 | 0.116 | |
| 6 | Punjab Kings | 14 | 6 | 8 | 0 | 12 | −0.001 | |
| 7 | Rajasthan Royals | 14 | 5 | 9 | 0 | 10 | −0.993 | |
| 8 | Sunrisers Hyderabad | 14 | 3 | 11 | 0 | 6 | −0.545 | |

Source: ESPNcricinfo
(C) Champions; (R) Runners-up
The four top-ranked teams qualified for the playoffs.

== League stage ==
The full schedule was published on the IPL website on 7 March 2021.

=== Matches ===
Match 1
9 April 2021
19:30 (N)
Scorecard

| Mumbai Indians; 159/9 (20 overs) | v | Royal Challengers Bangalore; 160/8 (20 overs) |
| Chris Lynn 49 (35); Harshal Patel 5/27 (4 overs) | | AB de Villiers 48 (27); Jasprit Bumrah 2/26 (4 overs) |

Royal Challengers Bangalore won by 2 wickets
M. A. Chidambaram Stadium, Chennai
Umpires: K. N. Ananthapadmanabhan (Ind) and Nitin Menon (Ind)
Player of the match: Harshal Patel (Royal Challengers Bangalore)

- Royal Challengers Bangalore won the toss and elected to field.

Match 6
14 April 2021
19:30 (N)
Scorecard

| Royal Challengers Bangalore; 149/8 (20 overs) | v | Sunrisers Hyderabad; 143/9 (20 overs) |
| Glenn Maxwell 59 (41); Jason Holder 3/30 (4 overs) | | David Warner 54 (37); Shahbaz Ahmed 3/7 (2 overs) |

Royal Challengers Bangalore won by 6 runs
M. A. Chidambaram Stadium, Chennai
Umpires: Ulhas Gandhe (Ind) and Nitin Menon (Ind)
Player of the match: Glenn Maxwell (Royal Challengers Bangalore)

- Sunrisers Hyderabad won the toss and elected to field.

Match 10
18 April 2021
15:30 (D/N)
Scorecard

| Royal Challengers Bangalore; 204/4 (20 overs) | v | Kolkata Knight Riders; 166/8 (20 overs) |
| Glenn Maxwell 78 (49); Varun Chakravarthy 2/39 (4 overs) | | Andre Russell 31 (20); Kyle Jamieson 3/41 (3 overs) |

Royal Challengers Bangalore won by 38 runs
M. A. Chidambaram Stadium, Chennai
Umpires: Nitin Menon (Ind) and Chettithody Shamshuddin (Ind)
Player of the match: AB de Villiers (Royal Challengers Bangalore)

- Royal Challengers Bangalore won the toss and elected to bat.

Match 16
22 April 2021
19:30 (N)
Scorecard

| Rajasthan Royals; 177/9 (20 overs) | v | Royal Challengers Bangalore; 181/0 (16.3 overs) |
| Shivam Dube 46 (32); Mohammed Siraj 3/27 (4 overs) | | Devdutt Padikkal 101* (52) |

Royal Challengers Bangalore won by 10 wickets
Wankhede Stadium, Mumbai
Umpires: Jayaraman Madanagopal (Ind) and Sundaram Ravi (Ind)
Player of the match: Devdutt Padikkal (Royal Challengers Bangalore)

- Royal Challengers Bangalore won the toss and elected to field.
- Virat Kohli (Royal Challengers Bangalore) became the first player to score 6,000 runs in the IPL.

Match 19
25 April 2021
15:30 (D/N)
Scorecard

| Chennai Super Kings; 191/4 (20 overs) | v | Royal Challengers Bangalore; 122/9 (20 overs) |
| Ravindra Jadeja 62* (28); Harshal Patel 3/51 (4 overs) | | Devdutt Padikkal 34 (15); Ravindra Jadeja 3/13 (4 overs) |

Chennai Super Kings won by 69 runs
Wankhede Stadium, Mumbai
Umpires: Anil Chaudhary (Ind) and Virender Sharma (Ind)
Player of the match: Ravindra Jadeja (Chennai Super Kings)

- Chennai Super Kings won the toss and elected to bat.
- Harshal Patel (Royal Challengers Bangalore) bowled the joint-most expensive over in an IPL match, conceding 37 runs.

Match 22
27 April 2021
19:30 (N)
Scorecard

| Royal Challengers Bangalore; 171/5 (20 overs) | v | Delhi Capitals; 170/4 (20 overs) |
| AB de Villiers 75* (42); Avesh Khan 1/24 (4 overs) | | Rishabh Pant 58* (48); Harshal Patel 2/37 (4 overs) |

Royal Challengers Bangalore won by 1 run
Narendra Modi Stadium, Ahmedabad
Umpires: Sundaram Ravi (Ind) and Virender Sharma (Ind)
Player of the match: AB de Villiers (Royal Challengers Bangalore)

- Delhi Capitals won the toss and elected to field.
- AB de Villiers (Royal Challengers Bangalore) became the sixth player, and the second overseas one, to score 5,000 runs in the IPL.

Match 26
30 April 2021
19:30 (N)
Scorecard

| Punjab Kings; 179/5 (20 overs) | v | Royal Challengers Bangalore; 145/8 (20 overs) |
| KL Rahul 91* (57); Kyle Jamieson 2/32 (3 overs) | | Virat Kohli 35 (34); Harpreet Brar 3/19 (4 overs) |

Punjab Kings won by 34 runs
Narendra Modi Stadium, Ahmedabad
Umpires: Sundaram Ravi (Ind) and Virender Sharma (Ind)
Player of the match: Harpreet Brar (Punjab Kings)

- Royal Challengers Bangalore won the toss and elected to field.

Match 31
20 September 2021
19:30 (N)
Scorecard

| Royal Challengers Bangalore; 92 (19 overs) | v | Kolkata Knight Riders; 94/1 (10 overs) |
| Devdutt Padikkal 22 (20); Andre Russell 3/9 (3 overs) | | Shubman Gill 48 (34); Yuzvendra Chahal 1/23 (2 overs) |

Kolkata Knight Riders won by 9 wickets
Sheikh Zayed Cricket Stadium, Abu Dhabi
Umpires: Chris Gaffaney (NZ) and Sundaram Ravi (Ind)
Player of the match: Varun Chakravarthy (Kolkata Knight Riders)

- Royal Challengers Bangalore won the toss and elected to bat.
- Virat Kohli (Royal Challengers Bangalore) became the first player to play 200 matches for a single franchise.

Match 35
24 September 2021
19:30 (N)
Scorecard

| Royal Challengers Bangalore; 156/6 (20 overs) | v | Chennai Super Kings; 157/4 (18.1 overs) |
| Devdutt Padikkal 70 (50); Dwayne Bravo 3/24 (4 overs) | | Ruturaj Gaikwad 38 (26); Harshal Patel 2/25 (3.1 overs) |

Chennai Super Kings won by 6 wickets
Sharjah Cricket Stadium, Sharjah
Umpires: Anil Chaudhary (Ind) and Nitin Menon (Ind)
Player of the match: Dwayne Bravo (Chennai Super Kings)

- Chennai Super Kings won the toss and elected to field.

Match 39
26 September 2021
19:30 (N)
Scorecard

| Royal Challengers Bangalore; 165/6 (20 overs) | v | Mumbai Indians; 111 (18.1 overs) |
| Glenn Maxwell 56 (37); Jasprit Bumrah 3/36 (4 overs) | | Rohit Sharma 43 (28); Harshal Patel 4/17 (3.1 overs) |

Royal Challengers Bangalore won by 54 runs
Dubai International Cricket Stadium, Dubai
Umpires: Anil Chaudhary (Ind) and Michael Gough (Eng)
Player of the match: Glenn Maxwell (Royal Challengers Bangalore)

- Mumbai Indians won the toss and elected to field.
- Virat Kohli (Royal Challengers Bangalore) became the first Indian player and fifth overall to score 10,000 runs in T20s.
- Harshal Patel (Royal Challengers Bangalore) took a hat-trick.

Match 43
29 September 2021
19:30 (N)
Scorecard

| Rajasthan Royals; 149/9 (20 overs) | v | Royal Challengers Bangalore; 153/3 (17.1 overs) |
| Evin Lewis 58 (37); Harshal Patel 3/34 (4 overs) | | Glenn Maxwell 50* (30); Mustafizur Rahman 2/20 (3 overs) |

Royal Challengers Bangalore won by 7 wickets
Dubai International Cricket Stadium, Dubai
Umpires: K. N. Ananthapadmanabhan (Ind) and Anil Dandekar (Ind)
Player of the match: Yuzvendra Chahal (Royal Challengers Bangalore)

- Royal Challengers Bangalore won the toss and elected to field.

Match 48
3 October 2021
15:30 (D/N)
Scorecard

| Royal Challengers Bangalore; 164/7 (20 overs) | v | Punjab Kings; 158/6 (20 overs) |
| Glenn Maxwell 57 (33); Moises Henriques 3/12 (4 overs) | | Mayank Agarwal 57 (42); Yuzvendra Chahal 3/29 (4 overs) |

Royal Challengers Bangalore won by 6 runs
Sharjah Cricket Stadium, Sharjah
Umpires: K. N. Ananthapadmanabhan (Ind) and Richard Illingworth (Eng)
Player of the match: Glenn Maxwell (Royal Challengers Bangalore)

- Royal Challengers Bangalore won the toss and elected to bat.
- Royal Challengers Bangalore qualified for the playoffs as a result of this match.

Match 52
6 October 2021
19:30 (N)
Scorecard

| Sunrisers Hyderabad; 141/7 (20 overs) | v | Royal Challengers Bangalore; 137/6 (20 overs) |
| Jason Roy 44 (38); Harshal Patel 3/33 (4 overs) | | Devdutt Padikkal 41 (52); Umran Malik 1/21 (4 overs) |

Sunrisers Hyderabad won by 4 runs
Sheikh Zayed Cricket Stadium, Abu Dhabi
Umpires: Ulhas Gandhe (Ind) and Sundaram Ravi (Ind)
Player of the match: Kane Williamson (Sunrisers Hyderabad)

- Royal Challengers Bangalore won the toss and elected to field.

Match 56
8 October 2021
19:30 (N)
Scorecard

| Delhi Capitals; 164/5 (20 overs) | v | Royal Challengers Bangalore; 166/3 (20 overs) |
| Prithvi Shaw 48 (31); Mohammed Siraj 2/25 (4 overs) | | K. S. Bharat 78* (52); Anrich Nortje 2/24 (4 overs) |

Royal Challengers Bangalore won by 7 wickets
Dubai International Cricket Stadium, Dubai
Umpires: K. N. Ananthapadmanabhan (Ind) and Nitin Menon (Ind)
Player of the match: K. S. Bharat (Royal Challengers Bangalore)

- Royal Challengers Bangalore won the toss and elected to field.
- Chennai Super Kings advanced to Qualifier 1 having a better net run rate than the Royal Challengers Bangalore.

=== Playoffs ===
Eliminator

11 October 2021
19:30 (N)
Scorecard

| Royal Challengers Bangalore; 138/7 (20 overs) | v | Kolkata Knight Riders; 139/6 (19.4 overs) |
| Virat Kohli 39 (33); Sunil Narine 4/21 (4 overs) | | Shubman Gill 29 (18); Yuzvendra Chahal 2/16 (4 overs) |

Kolkata Knight Riders won by 4 wickets
Sharjah Cricket Stadium, Sharjah
Umpires: Chris Gaffaney (NZ) and Virender Sharma (Ind)
Player of the match: Sunil Narine (Kolkata Knight Riders)

- Royal Challengers Bangalore won the toss and elected to bat.

== Statistics ==
=== Most runs ===
| No. | Name | Match | Inns | NO | Runs | HS | Ave. | BF | SR | 100s | 50s | 0 | 4s | 6s |
|---|---|---|---|---|---|---|---|---|---|---|---|---|---|---|
| 1 | Glenn Maxwell | 15 | 14 | 2 | 513 | 78 | 42.75 | 356 | 144.10 | 0 | 6 | 1 | 48 | 21 |
| 2 | Devdutt Padikkal | 14 | 14 | 1 | 411 | 101* | 31.61 | 328 | 125.30 | 1 | 1 | 2 | 44 | 14 |
| 3 | Virat Kohli | 15 | 15 | 1 | 405 | 72* | 28.92 | 339 | 119.40 | 0 | 3 | 0 | 43 | 9 |
| 4 | AB de Villiers | 15 | 14 | 4 | 313 | 76* | 31.30 | 211 | 148.34 | 0 | 2 | 1 | 23 | 16 |
| 5 | K.S. Bharat | 8 | 7 | 2 | 191 | 78* | 38.22 | 156 | 122.43 | 0 | 1 | 0 | 10 | 8 |
| 6 | Rajat Patidar | 4 | 4 | 0 | 71 | 31 | 17.75 | 62 | 114.51 | 0 | 0 | 0 | 3 | 3 |
| 7 | Kyle Jamieson | 9 | 7 | 3 | 65 | 16* | 16.25 | 55 | 118.08 | 0 | 0 | 0 | 5 | 3 |

Glenn Maxwell was the fifth-highest run scorer in IPL 2021

- Source: ESPNcricinfo

=== Most wickets ===
| No. | Name | Match | Inns | Overs | Maidens | Runs | Wickets | BBI | Ave. | Econ. | SR | 4W | 5W |
|---|---|---|---|---|---|---|---|---|---|---|---|---|---|
| 1 | Harshal Patel | 15 | 15 | 56.2 | 0 | 459 | 32 | 5/27 | 14.34 | 8.14 | 10.5 | 1 | 1 |
| 2 | Yuzvendra Chahal | 15 | 15 | 53.0 | 1 | 374 | 18 | 3/11 | 20.77 | 7.05 | 17.6 | 0 | 0 |
| 3 | Mohammed Siraj | 15 | 15 | 52.0 | 1 | 353 | 11 | 3/27 | 32.09 | 6.78 | 28.3 | 0 | 0 |
| 4 | Kyle Jamieson | 9 | 9 | 28.0 | 1 | 269 | 9 | 3/41 | 29.88 | 9.60 | 18.6 | 0 | 0 |
| 5 | Shahbaz Ahmed | 11 | 6 | 14.0 | 0 | 92 | 7 | 3/7 | 13.14 | 6.57 | 12.00 | 0 | 0 |
| 6 | Dan Christian | 9 | 9 | 16.4 | 0 | 155 | 4 | 2/14 | 38.75 | 9.30 | 25.0 | 0 | 0 |
| 7 | Washington Sundar | 6 | 6 | 16.0 | 0 | 118 | 3 | 1/7 | 39.33 | 7.37 | 32.0 | 0 | 0 |
| 7 | George Garton | 5 | 5 | 15.0 | 0 | 135 | 3 | 1/27 | 45.00 | 9.00 | 30.0 | 0 | 0 |
| 7 | Glenn Maxwell | 15 | 6 | 16.0 | 0 | 135 | 3 | 2/23 | 45.00 | 8.43 | 32.0 | 0 | 0 |

- Harshal Patel won the Purple Cap as he is highest wicket taker in the competition.
- Source: Cricinfo

== Player of the match awards ==
| No. | Date | Player | Opponent | Result | Contribution | Ref. |
|---|---|---|---|---|---|---|
| 1 | 9 April 2021 | Harshal Patel | Mumbai Indians | Won by 2 wickets | 5/27 (4 overs) | |
| 2 | 14 April 2021 | Glenn Maxwell | Sunrisers Hyderabad | Won by 6 runs | 59 (41) | |
| 3 | 18 April 2021 | AB de Villiers | Kolkata Knight Riders | Won by 38 runs | 76* (34) | |
| 4 | 22 April 2021 | Devdutt Padikkal | Rajasthan Royals | Won by 10 wickets | 101* (52) | |
| 5 | 27 April 2021 | AB de Villiers | Delhi Capitals | Won by 1 run | 75* (42) | |
| 6 | 26 September 2021 | Glenn Maxwell | Mumbai Indians | Won by 54 runs | 56 (37) and 2/23 (4 overs) | |
| 7 | 29 September 2021 | Yuzvendra Chahal | Rajasthan Royals | Won by 7 wickets | 2/18 (4 overs) | |
| 8 | 3 October 2021 | Glenn Maxwell | Punjab Kings | Won by 6 runs | 57 (33) | |
| 9 | 8 October 2021 | K. S. Bharat | Delhi Capitals | Won by 7 wickets | 78* (52) | |
