= 2021 Punjab Kings season =

IPL based franchise cricket team in India

Punjab Kings
2021 season
- Coach: Anil Kumble
- Captain: KL Rahul
- Ground(s): Punjab Cricket Association IS Bindra Stadium
- Tournament performance: League stage (6th)
- Most runs: KL Rahul (626)
- Most wickets: Mohammad Shami (19)

The 2021 season was the 14th season for the Indian Premier League franchise Punjab Kings. They were one of the eight teams competed in the 2021 Indian Premier League. After winning only 6 matches out of 14 matches, they finished sixth in the tournament.

== Background ==
=== Player retention and transfers ===
The Punjab Kings retained 16 players and released nine players.

Retained Players: KL Rahul, Arshdeep Singh, Chris Gayle, Darshan Nalkande, Harpreet Brar, Mandeep Singh, Mayank Agarwal, Mohammad Shami, Murugan Ashwin, Nicholas Pooran, Sarfaraz Khan, Deepak Hooda, Ishan Porel, Ravi Bishnoi, Chris Jordan, Prabhsimran Singh, Rahul Chahar

Released Players: Glenn Maxwell, Sheldon Cottrell, Mujeeb Zadran, Hardus Viljoen, James Neesham, Krishnappa Gowtham, Karun Nair, Jagadeesha Suchith, Tajinder Singh Dhillon

Added Players: Dawid Malan, Riley Meredith, Jhye Richardson, Shahrukh Khan, Jalaj Saxena, Moises Henriques, Utkarsh Singh, Fabian Allen, Saurabh Kumar

== Squad ==
- Players with international caps are listed in **bold**.

No.	Name	Nationality	Birth date	Batting style	Bowling style	Year signed	Salary	Notes
Batsmen
16	**Mayank Agarwal**	India	16 February 1991 (aged 30)	Right-handed	Right-arm off break	2018	₹1 crore (US$120,000)	Vice Captain
18	**Mandeep Singh**	India	18 December 1991 (aged 29)	Right-handed	Right-arm medium	2019	₹1.4 crore (US$170,000)	
35	Shahrukh Khan	India	27 May 1995 (aged 25)	Right-handed	Right-arm off break	2021	₹5.25 crore (US$620,000)	
44	**Aiden Markram**	South Africa	4 October 1994 (aged 26)	Right-handed	Right-arm off break	2021	₹1.5 crore (US$180,000)	Overseas; Replacement for Dawid Malan
97	Sarfaraz Khan	India	27 October 1997 (aged 23)	Right-handed	Right-arm leg break	2019	₹25 lakh (US$30,000)	
99	**Dawid Malan**	England	3 September 1987 (aged 33)	Left-handed	Right-arm leg break	2021	₹1.5 crore (US$180,000)	Overseas; Pulled out due to Bubble Fatigue
333	**Chris Gayle**	Jamaica	21 September 1979 (aged 41)	Left-handed	Right-arm off break	2018	₹2 crore (US$240,000)	Overseas; Pulled out due to Bubble Fatigue
All-rounders
6	Jalaj Saxena	India	15 December 1986 (aged 34)	Right-handed	Right-arm off break	2021	₹30 lakh (US$35,000)	
8	Saurabh Kumar	India	1 May 1993 (aged 27)	Left-handed	Slow left-arm orthodox	2021	₹20 lakh (US$24,000)	
21	**Moises Henriques**	Australia	1 February 1987 (aged 34)	Right-handed	Right-arm fast medium	2021	₹4.2 crore (US$500,000)	Overseas
38	**Fabian Allen**	Jamaica	7 May 1995 (aged 25)	Right-handed	Slow left-arm orthodox	2021	₹75 lakh (US$89,000)	Overseas
57	Deepak Hooda	India	19 April 1995 (aged 25)	Right-handed	Right-arm off break	2020	₹50 lakh (US$59,000)	
95	Harpreet Brar	India	16 September 1995 (aged 25)	Left-handed	Slow left-arm orthodox	2019	₹20 lakh (US$24,000)	
Wicket-keepers
1	**K. L. Rahul**	India	18 April 1992 (aged 28)	Right-handed	Right-arm medium	2018	₹11 crore (US$1.3 million)	Captain
29	**Nicholas Pooran**	Trinidad and Tobago	2 October 1995 (aged 25)	Left-handed	—	2019	₹4.2 crore (US$500,000)	Overseas
84	Prabhsimran Singh	India	10 August 2000 (aged 20)	Right-handed	—	2020	₹55 lakh (US$65,000)	
Bowlers
2	Arshdeep Singh	India	5 February 1999 (aged 22)	Left-handed	Left-arm medium-fast	2019	₹20 lakh (US$24,000)	
4	Darshan Nalkande	India	4 October 1998 (aged 22)	Right-handed	Right-arm medium-fast	2019	₹3 crore (US$350,000)	
11	**Mohammed Shami**	India	3 September 1990 (aged 30)	Right-handed	Right-arm fast	2019	₹4.8 crore (US$570,000)	
12	**Riley Meredith**	Australia	21 June 1996 (aged 24)	Right-handed	Right-arm fast	2021	₹8 crore (US$950,000)	Overseas; Pulled out due to Bubble Fatigue
34	**Chris Jordan**	England	4 October 1988 (aged 32)	Right-handed	Right-arm fast-medium	2020	₹3 crore (US$354,843.60)	Overseas
55	Ishan Porel	India	5 September 1998 (aged 22)	Right-handed	Right-arm fast-medium	2020	₹20 lakh (US$24,000)	
56	Ravi Bishnoi	India	5 September 2000 (aged 20)	Right-handed	Right-arm leg break	2020	₹2 crore (US$240,000)	
60	**Jhye Richardson**	Australia	20 September 1996 (aged 24)	Right-handed	Right-arm fast	2021	₹14 crore (US$1.7 million)	Overseas; Pulled out due to Bubble Fatigue
72	**Nathan Ellis**	Australia	22 December 1994 (aged 26)	Right-handed	Right-arm fast medium	2021	₹20 lakh (US$24,000)	Overseas; Replacement for Riley Meredith
88	**Adil Rashid**	England	17 March 1988 (aged 33)	Right-handed	Right-arm leg break	2021	₹1.5 crore (US$180,000)	Overseas; Replacement for Jhye Richardson
89	Murugan Ashwin	India	8 September 1990 (aged 30)	Right-handed	Right-arm leg break	2019	₹20 lakh (US$24,000)	
Source:PBKS Players

== Administration and support staff ==
Position	Name
Owners	Mohit Burman, Ness Wadia, Priety Zinta, Karan Paul
CEO	Satish Menon
Team manager	Avinash Vaidya
Director of cricket operations and head coach	Anil Kumble
Assistant coaches	Andy Flower Bharat Arun
Batting coach	Wasim Jaffer
Bowling coach	Damien Wright
Fielding coach	Jonty Rhodes
Team physio	Andrew Leipus
Trainer	Adrian Le Roux
Team doctor	Dr Srinand Srinivas
Source:PBKS Staff

== Kit manufacturers and sponsors ==
Kit manufacturer	Shirt sponsor (Front)	Shirt sponsor (back)	Chest Branding
T10 Sports	EbixCash	BKT	Lotus Herbals
Source : punjabkingsipl.in

T20 uniform

== Teams and standings ==
=== Results by match ===
Round	1	2	3	4	5	6	7	8	9	10	11	12	13	14
Result	W	L	L	L	W	L	W	L	L	W	L	W	L	W
Position	3	7	7	8	5	6	5	6	7	5	6	5	5	5

Source: Fixtures
W = Win; L = Loss; NR = No Result

Pos	Team	Pld	W	L	NR	Pts	NRR	
1	Delhi Capitals (3rd)	14	10	4	0	20	0.481	Advanced to Qualifier 1
2	Chennai Super Kings (C)	14	9	5	0	18	0.455	Advanced to Qualifier 1
3	Royal Challengers Bangalore (4th)	14	9	5	0	18	−0.140	Advanced to the Eliminator
4	Kolkata Knight Riders (R)	14	7	7	0	14	0.587	Advanced to the Eliminator
5	Mumbai Indians	14	7	7	0	14	0.116	
6	Punjab Kings	14	6	8	0	12	−0.001	
7	Rajasthan Royals	14	5	9	0	10	−0.993	
8	Sunrisers Hyderabad	14	3	11	0	6	−0.545	

Source: ESPNcricinfo
(C) Champions; (R) Runners-up
The four top-ranked teams qualified for the playoffs.

== League stage ==
The full schedule was published on the IPL website on 7 March 2021.

=== Matches ===
Match 4
12 April 2021
19:30 (N)
Scorecard

Punjab Kings; 221/6 (20 overs)	v	Rajasthan Royals; 217/7 (20 overs)
KL Rahul 91 (50); Chetan Sakariya 3/31 (4 overs)		Sanju Samson 119 (63); Arshdeep Singh 3/35 (4 overs)

Punjab Kings won by 4 runs
Wankhede Stadium, Mumbai
Umpires: Anil Chaudhary (Ind) and Sundaram Ravi (Ind)
Player of the match: Sanju Samson (Rajasthan Royals)

- Rajasthan Royals won the toss and elected to field.

Match 8
16 April 2021
19:30 (N)
Scorecard

Punjab Kings; 106/8 (20 overs)	v	Chennai Super Kings; 107/4 (15.4 overs)
Shahrukh Khan 47 (36); Deepak Chahar 4/13 (4 overs)		Moeen Ali 46 (31); Mohammed Shami 2/21 (4 overs)

Chennai Super Kings won by 6 wickets
Wankhede Stadium, Mumbai
Umpires: Anil Chaudhary (Ind) and Anil Dandekar (Ind)
Player of the match: Deepak Chahar (Chennai Super Kings)

- Chennai Super Kings won the toss and elected to field.

Match 11
18 April 2021
19:30 (N)
Scorecard

Punjab Kings; 195/4 (20 overs)	v	Delhi Capitals; 198/4 (18.2 overs)
Mayank Agarwal 69 (36); Lukman Meriwala 1/32 (3 overs)		Shikhar Dhawan 92 (49); Jhye Richardson 2/41 (4 overs)

Delhi Capitals won by 6 wickets
Wankhede Stadium, Mumbai
Umpires: Anil Chaudhary (Ind) and Paul Reiffel (Aus)
Player of the match: Shikhar Dhawan (Delhi Capitals)

- Delhi Capitals won the toss and elected to field.

Match 14
21 April 2021
15:30 (D/N)
Scorecard

Punjab Kings; 120 (19.4 overs)	v	Sunrisers Hyderabad; 121/1 (18.4 overs)
Shahrukh Khan 22 (17); Khaleel Ahmed 3/21 (4 overs)		Jonny Bairstow 63* (56); Fabian Allen 1/22 (4 overs)

Sunrisers Hyderabad won by 9 wickets
M. A. Chidambaram Stadium, Chennai
Umpires: Nitin Menon (Ind) and Krishnamachari Srinivasan (Ind)
Player of the match: Jonny Bairstow (Sunrisers Hyderabad)

- Punjab Kings won the toss and elected to bat.

Match 17
23 April 2021
19:30 (N)
Scorecard

Mumbai Indians; 131/6 (20 overs)	v	Punjab Kings; 132/1 (17.4 overs)
Rohit Sharma 63 (52); Ravi Bishnoi 2/21 (4 overs); Mohammed Shami 2/21 (4 overs)		KL Rahul 60* (52); Rahul Chahar 1/19 (4 overs)

Punjab Kings won by 9 wickets
M. A. Chidambaram Stadium, Chennai
Umpires: Nitin Menon (Ind) and Chettithody Shamshuddin (Ind)
Player of the match: KL Rahul (Punjab Kings)

- Punjab Kings won the toss and elected to field.

Match 21
26 April 2021
19:30 (N)
Scorecard

Punjab Kings; 123/9 (20 overs)	v	Kolkata Knight Riders; 126/5 (16.4 overs)
Mayank Agarwal 31 (34); Prasidh Krishna 3/30 (4 overs)		Eoin Morgan 47* (40); Moises Henriques 1/5 (1 over)

Kolkata Knight Riders won 5 wickets
Narendra Modi Stadium, Ahmedabad
Umpires: Yeshwant Barde (Ind) and Paul Reiffel (Aus)
Player of the match: Eoin Morgan (Kolkata Knight Riders)

- Kolkata Knight Riders won the toss and elected to field.

Match 26
30 April 2021
19:30 (N)
Scorecard

Punjab Kings; 179/5 (20 overs)	v	Royal Challengers Bangalore; 145/8 (20 overs)
KL Rahul 91* (57); Kyle Jamieson 2/32 (3 overs)		Virat Kohli 35 (34); Harpreet Brar 3/19 (4 overs)

Punjab Kings won by 34 runs
Narendra Modi Stadium, Ahmedabad
Umpires: Sundaram Ravi (Ind) and Virender Sharma (Ind)
Player of the match: Harpreet Brar (Punjab Kings)

- Royal Challengers Bangalore won the toss and elected to field.

Match 29
2 May 2021
19:30 (N)
Scorecard

Punjab Kings; 166/6 (20 overs)	v	Delhi Capitals; 167/3 (17.4 overs)
Mayank Agarwal 99* (58); Kagiso Rabada 3/36 (4 overs)		Shikhar Dhawan 69* (47); Harpreet Brar 1/19 (3 overs)

Delhi Capitals won by 7 wickets
Narendra Modi Stadium, Ahmedabad
Umpires: Anil Chaudhary (Ind) and Anil Dandekar (Ind)
Player of the match: Mayank Agarwal (Punjab Kings)

- Delhi Capitals won the toss and elected to field.

Match 37
25 September 2021
19:30 (N)
Scorecard

Punjab Kings; 125/7 (20 overs)	v	Sunrisers Hyderabad; 120/7 (20 overs)
Aiden Markram 27 (32); Jason Holder 3/19 (4 overs)		Jason Holder 47* (29); Ravi Bishnoi 3/24 (4 overs)

Punjab Kings won by 5 runs
Sharjah Cricket Stadium, Sharjah
Umpires: Yeshwant Barde (Ind) and Richard Illingworth (Eng)
Player of the match: Jason Holder (Sunrisers Hyderabad)

- Sunrisers Hyderabad won the toss and elected to field.

Match 42
28 September 2021
19:30 (N)
Scorecard

Punjab Kings; 135/6 (20 overs)	v	Mumbai Indians; 137/4 (19 overs)
Aiden Markram 42 (29); Kieron Pollard 2/8 (1 over)		Saurabh Tiwary 45 (37); Ravi Bishnoi 2/25 (4 overs)

Mumbai Indians won by 6 wickets
Sheikh Zayed Cricket Stadium, Abu Dhabi
Umpires: Sundaram Ravi (Ind) and Virender Sharma (Ind)
Player of the match: Kieron Pollard (Mumbai Indians)

- Mumbai Indians won the toss and elected to field.

Match 45
1 October 2021
19:30 (N)
Scorecard

Kolkata Knight Riders; 165/7 (20 overs)	v	Punjab Kings; 168/5 (19.3 overs)
Venkatesh Iyer 67 (49); Arshdeep Singh 3/32 (4 overs)		KL Rahul 67 (55); Varun Chakravarthy 2/24 (4 overs)

Punjab Kings won by 5 wickets
Dubai International Cricket Stadium, Dubai
Umpires: K. N. Ananthapadmanabhan (Ind) and Richard Illingworth (Eng)
Player of the match: KL Rahul (Punjab Kings)

- Punjab Kings won the toss and elected to field.
- Delhi Capitals qualified for the playoffs as a result of this match.

Match 48
3 October 2021
15:30 (D/N)
Scorecard

Royal Challengers Bangalore; 164/7 (20 overs)	v	Punjab Kings; 158/6 (20 overs)
Glenn Maxwell 57 (33); Moises Henriques 3/12 (4 overs)		Mayank Agarwal 57 (42); Yuzvendra Chahal 3/29 (4 overs)

Royal Challengers Bangalore won by 6 runs
Sharjah Cricket Stadium, Sharjah
Umpires: K. N. Ananthapadmanabhan (Ind) and Richard Illingworth (Eng)
Player of the match: Glenn Maxwell (Royal Challengers Bangalore)

- Royal Challengers Bangalore won the toss and elected to bat.
- Royal Challengers Bangalore qualified for the playoffs as a result of this match.

Match 53
7 October 2021
15:30 (D/N)
Scorecard

Chennai Super Kings; 134/6 (20 overs)	v	Punjab Kings; 139/4 (13 overs)
Faf du Plessis 76 (55); Chris Jordan 2/20 (3 overs)		KL Rahul 98* (42); Shardul Thakur 3/28 (3 overs)

Punjab Kings won by 6 wickets
Dubai International Cricket Stadium, Dubai
Umpires: Richard Illingworth (Eng) and Krishnamachari Srinivasan (Ind)
Player of the match: KL Rahul (Punjab Kings)

- Punjab Kings won the toss and elected to field.
- Delhi Capitals advanced to Qualifier 1 as a result of this match.

== Statistics ==
=== Most runs ===
No.	Name	Match	Inns	NO	Runs	HS	Ave.	BF	SR	100s	50s	0	4s	6s
1	KL Rahul	13	13	2	626	98*	62.60	276	178.34	0	6	0	48	30
2	Mayank Agarwal	12	12	1	441	99*	40.09	227	140.44	0	4	1	42	18
3	Chris Gayle	8	8	1	178	46	25.42	133	133.83	0	0	0	20	8
4	Deepak Hooda	9	8	1	116	64	16.57	83	139.75	0	1	0	7	8
5	Shahrukh Khan	8	7	2	107	47	21.40	84	127.38	0	0	0	7	6
6	Nicholas Pooran	8	7	0	60	32	8.57	55	109.09	0	0	0	3	3

- Source: ESPNcricinfo

=== Most wickets ===
No.	Name	Match	Inns	Overs	Runs	Maidens	Wickets	BBI	Ave.	Econ.	SR	4W	5W
1	Mohammad Shami	14	14	22.2	0	182	19	5/32	15.16	8.14	11.16	0	1
2	Arshdeep Singh	9	9	32.4	0	255	18	3/21	23.18	7.80	17.81	0	0
3	Harpreet Brar	3	3	10.0	1	55	5	3/19	24.2	5.50	12.0	0	0
4	Ravi Bishnoi	4	4	16.0	0	99	4	2/17	24.75	6.18	24.0	0	0
5	Riley Meredith	5	5	17.0	0	169	4	1/29	42.25	9.94	25.5	0	0
6	Jhye Richardson	3	3	11.0	0	117	3	2/41	39.00	10.63	22.0	0	0

- Source: ESPNcricinfo

== Player of the match awards ==
No.	Date	Player	Opponent	Result	Contribution	Ref.
1	23 April 2021	KL Rahul	Mumbai Indians	Won by 9 wickets	60* (52)	
2	30 April 2021	Harpreet Brar	Royal Challengers Bangalore	Won by 34 runs	25* (17) and 3/19 (4 overs)	
3	2 May 2021	Mayank Agarwal	Delhi Capitals	Lost by 7 wickets	99* (58)	
4	1 October 2021	KL Rahul	Kolkata Knight Riders	Won by 5 wickets	67 (55)	
5	7 October 2021	KL Rahul	Chennai Super Kings	Won by 6 wickets	98* (42) and 2 catches	
