= John Gloster =

Australian cricketer, coach, and physiotherapist

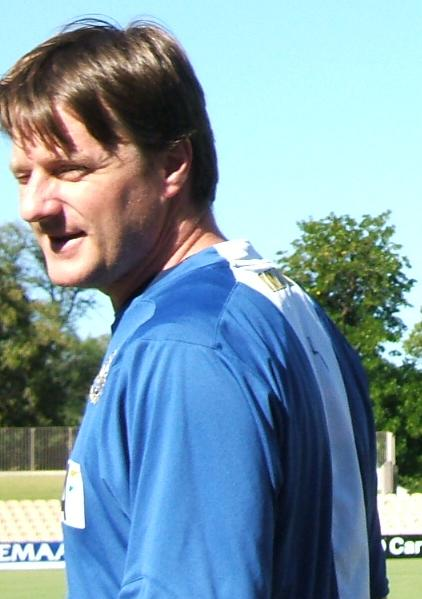
John Gloster

John Gloster is a physiotherapist who works with cricket teams. He was appointed the physiotherapist to the Indian team in February 2005.

== Early career ==
Gloster graduated from the University of South Australia, and then worked with the Surrey County Cricket Club for three years, from 1998 to 2001. He was appointed the physiotherapist of the Bangladesh cricket team, and worked with them for four years before moving to India. Gloster resigned from his position as Indian team physio on 14 February 2008. The 2007/2008 tour of Australia was his last assignment with the Indian team.

He works for the Rajasthan Royals team in the Indian Premier League since the inception of the team in 2008. Currently, he is appointed as a physio for Lahore Qalandars franchise cricket team in Pakistan Super League.
