= Kuldip Yadav =

Indian cricketer (born 1996)

Personal information
- Born: 15 October 1996 (age 30)
- Batting: Left-handed
- Bowling: Left-arm fast-medium
- Role: Bowler

Domestic team information
- Years: Team
- 2021–2023: Rajasthan Royals (squad no. 15)
- 2022–present: Delhi
- Source: ESPNcricinfo, 18 November 2019

Kuldip Yadav (born 15 October 1996) is an Indian cricketer who represents Delhi in domestic cricket and previously played for Rajasthan Royals in the Indian Premier League (IPL). He is a left-arm fast bowler.

== Career ==
Yadav hails from Mokalwas village in Pataudi. He was coached by Amit Kumar.

In November 2019, he was named in India U-23 squad for the 2019 ACC Emerging Teams Asia Cup, held in Bangladesh. He made his List A debut for India Emerging Team, against Hong Kong Emerging Team, in the Emerging Teams Cup on 18 November 2019.

In February 2021, Yadav was bought by the Rajasthan Royals in the IPL auction ahead of the 2021 Indian Premier League (IPL). He was picked in Rajasthan after being impressive in the trials on Nagpur Academy. He made his Twenty20 debut on 5 October 2021, for Rajasthan Royals against Mumbai Indians in the 2021 IPL. He was released by Rajasthan ahead of the mega auction for 2022 Indian Premier League.

In February 2022, he was re-bought by the Rajasthan Royals in the auction for the 2022 Indian Premier League tournament.

He made his first-class debut on 17 February 2022, for Delhi in the 2021–22 Ranji Trophy.
