= Saurabh Tiwary =

Indian cricketer (born 1989)

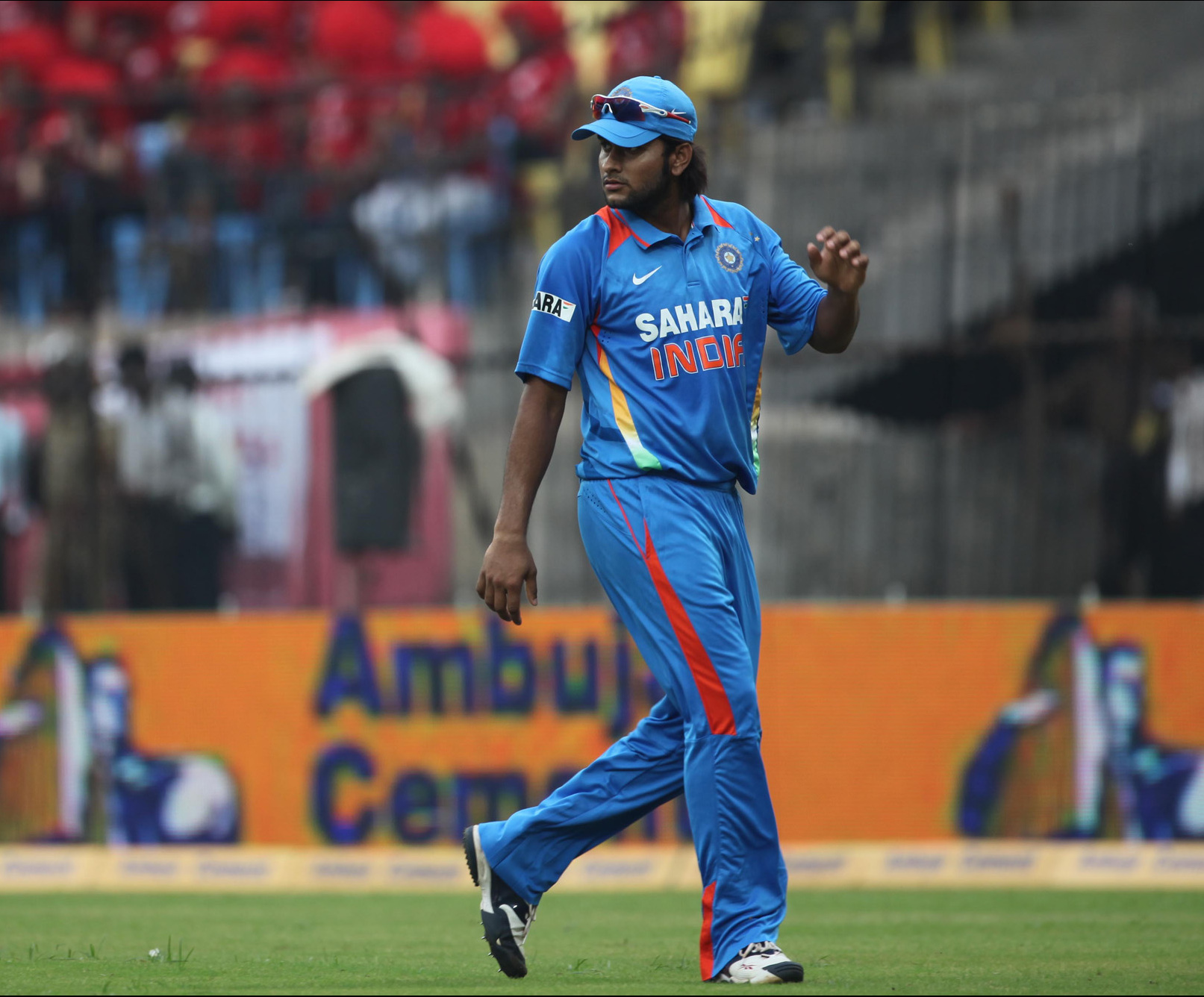
- Tiwary in 2010

Personal information
- Born: 30 December 1989 (age 36); Jamshedpur, Bihar, India (now Jharkhand)
- Height: 6 ft 3 in (1.91 m)
- Batting: Left-handed
- Bowling: Right-arm off-break
- Role: Batter

International information
- National side: India (2010)
- ODI debut (cap 189): 20 October 2010 v Australia
- Last ODI: 10 December 2010 v New Zealand

Domestic team information
- Years: Team
- 2005–2024: Jharkhand
- 2008–10, 2017–21: Mumbai Indians
- 2011–2013: Royal Challengers Bangalore
- 2015: Delhi Daredevils
- 2016: Rising Pune Supergiants

Career statistics
Competition	ODI	FC	LA	T20
Matches	3	116	116	181
Runs scored	49	8,076	4,050	3,454
Batting average	–	47.22	46.55	37.45
100s/50s	0/0	22/34	6/27	0/16
Top score	37*	238	138*	69
Balls bowled	–	417	214	6
Wickets	–	1	4	0
Bowling average	–	221.00	49.25	–
5 wickets in innings	–	0	0	–
10 wickets in match	–	0	0	–
Best bowling	–	1/0	2/40	–
Catches/stumpings	2/–	88/–	65/–	68/–
Medal record
Men's cricket
Representing India
ACC Asia Cup
Winner	2010 Sri Lanka
ICC U19 Cricket World Cup
Winner	2008 Malaysia
- Source: ESPNcricinfo, 16 January 2025

Saurabh Tiwary (born 30 December 1989) is an Indian former cricketer who played as a left-handed middle order batsman. He was part of the Indian squad that won the 2010 Asia Cup and the 2008 U19 World Cup. Tiwary currently serves as the secretary of Jharkhand State Cricket Association.

== Indian Premier League ==
He represented Mumbai Indians from the 2008 Indian Premier League. He had become a regular player for them in the IPL 2010, where he was dubbed as a left-handed version of Mahendra Singh Dhoni.

He has won the Under-23 player of the tournament for IPL 2010 representing Mumbai Indians as he had a fairly successful tournament, scoring 419 runs in 16 matches, at an average of 29.92 and strike rate of 135.59. He was signed by Royal Challengers Bangalore for the 2011 Indian Premier League at a price of US$1.6 million. In 2014 IPL auction, he was signed by Delhi Daredevils for ₹70 lakh (equivalent to ₹1.2 crore or US$130,000 in 2026). After Tiwary was sidelined by an injured shoulder, he was replaced by Imran Tahir. In the 2016 IPL, Tiwary and Albie Morkel were traded by the Delhi Daredevils to the new franchise Rising Pune Supergiants. In 2016 IPL he scored two promising half centuries against Royal Challengers Bangalore and Mumbai Indians.

In February 2017, he was bought by the Mumbai Indians team for the 2017 Indian Premier League for ₹30 lakh (equivalent to ₹52 lakh or US$56,000 in 2026). He scored a half century playing against Kolkata Knight Riders at Eden Gardens on 13 May 2017. In January 2018, he was bought by the Mumbai Indians in the 2018 IPL auction. In the 2020 IPL auction, he was bought by the Mumbai Indians ahead of the 2020 Indian Premier League.

== International career ==
Tiwary was called into the squad for the 2010 Asia Cup, but did not play. He made his ODI debut against Australia in Visakhapatnam in October 2010 after a few first-choice players were rested.
