= Harshal Patel =

Indian cricketer (born 1990)

Personal information
- Full name: Harshal Vikram Patel
- Born: 23 November 1990 (age 35); Sanand, Gujarat, India
- Batting: Right-handed
- Bowling: Right-arm fast-medium
- Role: Bowling all-rounder

International information
- National side: India
- T20I debut (cap 94): 19 November 2021 v New Zealand
- Last T20I: 3 January 2023 v Sri Lanka
- T20I shirt no.: 36

Domestic team information
- Years: Team
- 2009–2011: Gujarat
- 2011–: Haryana
- 2012–2017: Royal Challengers Bangalore
- 2018–2020: Delhi Daredevils (squad no. 13)
- 2021–2023: Royal Challengers Bangalore (squad no. 9)
- 2024: Punjab Kings
- 2025–present: Sunrisers Hyderabad

Career statistics
Competition	T20I	FC	LA	T20
Matches	25	74	72	201
Runs scored	77	1,524	680	1,280
Batting average	12.83	16.04	16.58	16.00
100s/50s	0/0	0/6	0/4	0/4
Top score	18	83	69*	82
Balls bowled	503	11.454	3,075	4,097
Wickets	29	246	105	247
Bowling average	26.55	24.02	26.39	23.11
5 wickets in innings	0	12	2	2
10 wickets in match	–	4	–	–
Best bowling	4/25	8/34	5/21	5/12
Catches/stumpings	5/–	29/–	17/–	45/–
- Source: ESPNcricinfo, 27 March 2025

Harshal Patel (born 23 November 1990) is an Indian cricketer who has played for the country's national team in Twenty20 internationals (T20I). A right-arm medium pace bowler who bats right-handed, Patel made his T20I debut against New Zealand on 19 November 2021. Patel has played for Gujarat and Haryana in domestic competitions. Currently, he is playing for Sunrisers Hyderabad in the Indian Premier League. He has also played for Royal Challengers Bangalore, Punjab Kings and Delhi Capitals in the Indian Premier League.

== Early life ==
A right-arm seamer with an effective slow ball, Patel took 23 wickets at an impressive average of in the 2008-09 Under-19 Vinoo Mankad Trophy. He later made his one-day debut for Gujarat in 2009–10. Harshal's family had planned to move to USA, but his brother Tapan Patel saw to it that he stayed on in India for the sake of his cricket. His elder sister died in COVID-19 era at age 33. For her last rites, Harshal took break from the IPL in 2021. Harshal was named in the squad for the 2010 U-19 World Cup in New Zealand. He was among three players from that squad to bag an IPL contract, with Mumbai Indians. Ignored by the Gujarat selectors for the first-class team, Harshal moved to Haryana and made an immediate impact in his debut Ranji Trophy season in 2011–12, running through Karnataka and Rajasthan with consecutive eight-fors in the quarter-final and semi-final. He was given a contract by the Royal Challengers Bangalore in the 2012 Indian Premier League.

== Career ==
Patel debuted immediately against Delhi and then finally rose to fame when he took a five-for in a flat batting track in Bangalore. He backed up an incisive opening spell and wrapped up the tail by taking 3/9 in this last 4.5 overs.

Patel followed up that performance by taking eight wickets for just 34 runs in the next game against defending champions Rajasthan. The opponents were bowled out for 89 and the day finished even with Haryana at 84/8. He became the first Haryana player since 1991 to catch the selectorial eyes with his performances.

In the 2012 IPL auction, Patel was bought by the Royal Challengers Bangalore. In January 2018, Patel was bought by the Delhi Daredevils (now Delhi Capitals) in the 2018 IPL auction. In January 2021, Patel was traded by the Delhi Capitals to the Royal Challengers Bangalore prior to the fourteenth season of IPL.

On 9 April 2021, in the first match of IPL 2021 while playing for the Royal Challengers Bangalore, Patel took 5 wicket-haul (5-27) against the Mumbai Indians. Harshal Patel is first bowler to claim a 5-wicket haul against Mumbai Indians in IPL. This is his best bowling figures in the IPL and he also became the first ever player to take a 5 wicket-haul against the Mumbai Indians in the IPL. His 5 wicket-haul also became the third best bowling figures by an uncapped Indian player in the IPL.

On 25 April 2021, in the same IPL season, Patel bowled the joint most expensive over in history of IPL. While playing against CSK, Patel gave away 37 runs in the 20th over while bowling to Ravindra Jadeja (6, 6, N6, 6, 2, 6, 4).

On 26 September 2021, playing against Mumbai Indians, Patel became the third bowler to take a hat-trick, after Praveen Kumar and Samuel Badree for Royal Challengers Bangalore, taking the wickets of Hardik Pandya, Kieron Pollard and Rahul Chahar, finishing with the figures of 4/17 in 3.1 overs. On 13 October 2021, Harshal was selected among 8 net bowlers for India national cricket team for ICC Men's T20 world cup.

By the end of IPL 2021, Patel ended with 32 wickets, making him the highest Indian wicket taker in a single season and joint-most with Dwayne Bravo.

In November 2021, he was named in India's Twenty20 International (T20I) squad for their series against New Zealand. He made his T20I debut on 19 November 2021, for India against New Zealand. He took two wickets and was named as the player of the match. He also followed with another fruitful two wicket haul to end the series with four scalps in two appearances.

In the 2022 IPL auction, Patel was bought by the Royal Challengers Bangalore for ₹10.75 crores. He briefly left the bio-bubble following the death of his sister.

In June 2022, he was named in India's squad for their T20I series against Ireland.

In the 2025 IPL auction, Patel was bought by the Sunrisers Hyderabad for ₹8.0 crores.
