= Virender Sharma =

Indian cricketer

Personal information
- Full name: Virender Kumar Sharma
- Born: 11 September 1971 (age 55); Hamirpur, Himachal Pradesh, India
- Role: Umpire

Umpiring information
- Tests umpired: 4 (2021–2022)
- ODIs umpired: 7 (2020–2025)
- T20Is umpired: 23 (2020–2025)
- WTests umpired: 1 (2024)
- WODIs umpired: 1 (2025)
- WT20Is umpired: 2 (2024)
- Source: ESPNcricinfo, 19 March 2023

Virender Sharma (born 11 September 1971) is an Indian international umpire and former cricketer. He played in fifty first-class and forty List A matches for Himachal Pradesh between 1990 and 2006. Sharma stood as an umpire in the Twenty20 tour match between India A vs South Africa on 29 September 2015.

In November 2016 during the Ranji Trophy match between Mumbai and Uttar Pradesh, Sharma was forced to stand at both ends for the entire day 2, after the other umpire Sam Nogajski was taken ill with food poisoning. The reserve umpire at the venue was not a member of the BCCI panel, which meant that he could only stand at square leg.

In March 2017, he stood in the final of the 2016–17 Vijay Hazare Trophy. On 10 January 2020, he stood in his first Twenty20 International (T20I) match, in the fixture between India and Sri Lanka. One week later, on 17 January 2020, he stood in his first One Day International (ODI) match, in the fixture between India and Australia.

In January 2021, the International Cricket Council (ICC) named him as one of the on-field umpires for the second Test match between India and England. On 13 February 2021, he stood in his first Test as an onfield umpire, between India and England.

In January 2023, he was named as one of the on-field umpires for the 2023 Under-19 Women's T20 World Cup.

== See also ==
- List of Test cricket umpires
- List of One Day International cricket umpires
- List of Twenty20 International cricket umpires
