= K. N. Ananthapadmanabhan =

Indian cricketer and umpire (born 1969)

Personal information
- Full name: Karumanaseri Narayanaiyer Ananthapadmanabhan
- Born: 8 September 1969 (age 57); Thiruvananthapuram, Kerala, India
- Batting: Right-handed
- Bowling: Right-arm leg break and googly

Domestic team information
- Years: Team
- 1988/89–2004/05: Kerala
- FC debut: 22 November 1988 Kerala v Hyderabad
- Last FC: 22 December 2004 Kerala v Jammu and Kashmir
- LA debut: 10 January 1993 Indian Board President's XI v Bombay
- Last LA: 11 December 2002 Kerala v Hyderabad

Umpiring information
- ODIs umpired: 10 (2021–2026)
- T20Is umpired: 28 (2021–2026)
- WTests umpired: 1 (2023)
- WODIs umpired: 7 (2010–2024)
- WT20Is umpired: 7 (2012–2018)

Career statistics
Competition	First-class	List A
Matches	105	54
Runs scored	2,891	493
Batting average	21.90	14.93
100s/50s	3/8	0/0
Top score	200	42
Balls bowled	21,573	2,435
Wickets	344	87
Bowling average	27.54	19.31
5 wickets in innings	25	2
10 wickets in match	5	0
Best bowling	8/57	5/38
Catches/stumpings	69/—	21/—
- Source: ESPNcricinfo, 17 March 2023

Karumanaseri Narayanaiyer Ananthapadmanabhan (born 8 September 1969) is an Indian cricket umpire and former first-class cricketer from the state of Kerala. He played for the India "A" national team in international cricket and for South Zone and Kerala in Indian domestic cricket. He is a former captain of Kerala state Ranji Trophy team. He now serves as an umpire at the first-class level and officiates in domestic cricket tournaments in India, including the Ranji Trophy and Indian Premier League. In August 2020, Ananthapadmanabhan was promoted to the International Panel of ICC Umpires.

== Playing career ==
Ananthapadmanabhan represented his state team Kerala and the South Zone in first-class and List A cricket in India. He also represent India "A" team in international cricket. He was a right-arm leg spin bowler and was efficient in bowling leg break and googly. In his first-class career, Ananthapadmanabhan took 344 wickets from the 105 matches he played. He also scored three hundreds, including a double century and thus played the role of an able all-rounder for his team. Ananthapadmanabhan enjoyed a very successful first-class career but could not go on to represent the national team India at the Test or ODI level, largely because his career coincided with the Indian leg spinner Anil Kumble. KN Anathapadamanabhan's miserable tale is one of the untold stories of Indian cricket.

== Umpiring career ==
Ananthapadmanabhan is now an umpire and has been officiating in major domestic tournaments in India since 2008. During the 2015–16 Ranji Trophy, he stood in the 2nd semi-final between Madhya Pradesh and Mumbai at Cuttack from 13 to 17 February 2016. During the 2016–17 Ranji Trophy, he officiated in the 2nd semi-final between Gujarat and Jharkhand at Nagpur from 1–5 January 2017. He also stood in matches in the 2016 and 2017 editions of Indian Premier League.

In August 2020 he was elevated to the ICC panel of international umpires. He stood in his first Twenty20 International (T20I) match, between India and England on 12 March 2021. He stood in his first One Day International (ODI) match, also between India and England, on 23 March 2021.

In January 2024, he was named as one of the sixteen match officials for 2024 Under-19 Cricket World Cup.

== See also ==
- List of One Day International cricket umpires
- List of Twenty20 International cricket umpires
