= Anil Chaudhary (umpire) =

Indian cricket umpire (born 1965)

Personal information
- Full name: Anil Kumar Chaudhary
- Born: 12 March 1965 (age 61); Delhi, India
- Role: Umpire

Umpiring information
- Tests umpired: 4 (2021–2022)
- ODIs umpired: 27 (2013–2023)
- T20Is umpired: 44 (2013–2023)
- WTests umpired: 1 (2023)
- WODIs umpired: 10 (2006–2017)
- WT20Is umpired: 3 (2016)
- Source: ESPNcricinfo, 24 December 2023

Anil Chaudhary (born 12 March 1965) is an Indian cricket umpire. He stood in his first Twenty20 International (T20I) on 10 October 2013, in a match between India and Australia. His first One Day International (ODI) as an umpire, between India and the West Indies, was played on 27 November 2013. He was one of the 17 on-field umpires for the 2018 Under-19 Cricket World Cup. In January 2020, he was named as one of the sixteen umpires for the 2020 Under-19 Cricket World Cup tournament in South Africa.

In January 2021, the International Cricket Council (ICC) named him as one of the on-field umpires for the first Test match between India and England. On 5 February 2021, he stood in his first Test as an onfield umpire, between India and England.

On 27 September 2023, he officiated an ODI between India and Australia, the last match he stood as an umpire. Later, he was replaced by Rohan Pandit in the International Panel of ICC Umpires for the 2023–24 season.

== See also ==
- List of Test cricket umpires
- List of One Day International cricket umpires
- List of Twenty20 International cricket umpires
