= 2024 Chennai Super Kings season =

2024 Indian Premier League cricket team

Chennai Super Kings
2024 season
- Coach: Stephen Fleming
- Captain: Ruturaj Gaikwad
- Ground(s): M. A. Chidambaram Stadium, Chennai
- IPL League: 5th
- Most runs: Ruturaj Gaikwad (583)
- Most wickets: Tushar Deshpande (17)
- Most catches: Daryl Mitchell (9)
- Most wicket-keeping dismissals: MS Dhoni (10)

The 2024 season was the 15th season for the Indian Premier League franchise Chennai Super Kings. They were one of the ten teams competed in the 2024 Indian Premier League. They were the defending champions, having won their 5th IPL title after defeating Gujarat Titans in the rain-affected 2023 Indian Premier League final. The Chennai Super Kings drew an average home attendance of 36,442 in the IPL in 2024.

Ahead of the 2024 season, MS Dhoni handed over the captaincy to Ruturaj Gaikwad. After their 7th loss on 18 May 2024, Chennai was eliminated from the 2024 Indian Premier League. They finished the League stage at the 5th place with 7 wins and 7 losses, garnering 14 points.

The team slightly improved on their home form winning 5 out of 7 in the league stage as compared to 4 in the previous year's title winning campaign. However, CSK's lack of away successes prevented the team from qualifying for the playoff by the barest of margins via NRR.

== Squad ==
- Players with international caps are listed in **bold**.
- * denotes a player who was unavailable for rest of the season.

| No. | Name | Nationality | Birth date | Batting style | Bowling style | Year signed | Salary | Notes |
Captain
| 31 | **Ruturaj Gaikwad** | India | 31 January 1997 (aged 27) | Right-handed | – | 2019 | ₹6 crore (US$630,000) | |
Batters
| 21 | **Ajinkya Rahane** | India | 6 June 1988 (aged 35) | Right-handed | Right-arm off spin | 2023 | ₹50 lakh (US$52,000) | |
| 66 | Shaik Rasheed | India | 24 September 2004 (aged 19) | Right-handed | Right-arm Leg spin | 2023 | ₹20 lakh (US$21,000) | |
| 1 | Sameer Rizvi | India | 6 December 2003 (aged 20) | Right-handed | – | 2024 | ₹8.40 crore (US$880,000) | |
Wicket-keepers
| 7 | **MS Dhoni** | India | 7 July 1981 (aged 42) | Right-handed | Right-arm medium | 2018 | ₹12 crore (US$1.3 million) | |
| 88 | **Devon Conway** | New Zealand | 8 July 1991 (aged 32) | Left-handed | Right-arm medium | 2022 | ₹1 crore (US$100,000) | Overseas; Withdrawn (Note: Richard Gleeson replaced Devon Conway, after the latter withdrew due to Thumb injury.) |
| 2 | Aravelly Avanish Rao | India | 2 June 2005 (aged 18) | Left-handed | – | 2024 | ₹20 lakh (US$21,000) | |
All-rounders
| 18 | **Moeen Ali** | England | 18 June 1987 (aged 36) | Left-handed | Right-arm off break | 2021 | ₹8 crore (US$840,000) | Overseas; Withdrawn (Note: English cricketers (including Moeen Ali) withdrew on 18 May 2024 due to the upcoming T20WC.) |
| 25 | **Shivam Dube** | India | 26 June 1993 (aged 30) | Left-handed | Right-arm medium | 2022 | ₹4 crore (US$420,000) | |
| 10 | Rajvardhan Hangargekar | India | 10 November 2002 (aged 21) | Right-handed | Right-arm fast-medium | 2022 | ₹1.5 crore (US$160,000) | |
| 8 | **Ravindra Jadeja** | India | 6 December 1988 (aged 35) | Left-handed | Left-arm slow orthodox | 2018 | ₹16 crore (US$1.7 million) | |
| 19 | Ajay Mandal | India | 25 February 1996 (aged 28) | Left-handed | Left-arm slow orthodox | 2023 | ₹20 lakh (US$21,000) | |
| 75 | **Daryl Mitchell** | New Zealand | 20 May 1991 (aged 32) | Right-handed | Right-arm medium | 2024 | ₹14 crore (US$1.5 million) | Overseas |
| 17 | **Rachin Ravindra** | New Zealand | 18 November 1999 (aged 24) | Left-handed | Left-arm slow orthodox | 2024 | ₹1.8 crore (US$190,000) | |
| 74 | **Mitchell Santner** | New Zealand | 5 February 1992 (aged 32) | Left-handed | Left-arm slow orthodox | 2018 | ₹1.9 crore (US$200,000) | Overseas |
| 27 | Nishant Sindhu | India | 9 April 2004 (aged 19) | Left-handed | Left-arm slow orthodox | 2023 | ₹60 lakh (US$63,000) | |
Pace bowlers
| 9 | **Deepak Chahar** | India | 7 August 1992 (aged 31) | Right-handed | Right-arm medium-fast | 2018 | ₹14 crore (US$1.5 million) | Withdrawn (Note: Deepak Chahar withrew due to Injury.) |
| 33 | Mukesh Choudhary | India | 6 July 1996 (aged 27) | Left-handed | Left-arm medium-fast | 2022 | ₹20 lakh (US$21,000) | |
| 24 | Tushar Deshpande | India | 15 May 1995 (aged 28) | Left-handed | Right-arm medium | 2022 | ₹20 lakh (US$21,000) | |
| 81 | **Matheesha Pathirana** | Sri Lanka | 18 December 2002 (aged 21) | Right-handed | Right-arm fast | 2022 | ₹20 lakh (US$21,000) | Overseas; Withdrawn (Note: Matheesha Pathirana withrew due to Jolt injury.) |
| 90 | **Mustafizur Rahman** | Bangladesh | 6 September 1995 (aged 28) | Left-handed | Left-arm fast-medium | 2024 | ₹2 crore (US$210,000) | Overseas; Withdrawn (Note: Mustafizur Rahman withrew due to National duty.) |
| 98 | Simarjeet Singh | India | 17 January 1998 (aged 26) | Right-handed | Right-arm medium-fast | 2022 | ₹20 lakh (US$21,000) | |
| 54 | **Shardul Thakur** | India | 16 October 1991 (aged 32) | Right-handed | Right-arm fast medium | 2024 | ₹4 crore (US$420,000) | |
| 11 | **Richard Gleeson** | England | 2 December 1987 (aged 36) | Right-handed | Right-arm fast medium | 2024 | ₹50 lakh (US$52,000) | Overseas; Replacement |
Spin bowlers
| 46 | Prashant Solanki | India | 22 February 2000 (aged 24) | Right-handed | Right-arm leg spin | 2022 | ₹1.2 crore (US$130,000) | |
| 61 | **Maheesh Theekshana** | Sri Lanka | 1 August 2000 (aged 23) | Right-handed | Right-arm off break | 2022 | ₹70 lakh (US$73,000) | Overseas |

- Source: ESPNcricinfo

== Administration and support staff ==
| Position | Name |
|---|---|
| CEO | Kasinath Viswanathan |
| Team manager | Russell Radhakrishnan |
| Head coach | Stephen Fleming |
| Batting coach | Michael Hussey |
| Bowling coach | Dwayne Bravo |
| Fielding coach | Rajiv Kumar |
Source: Official website

== Sponsors ==
- Kit manufacturer: SEVEN
- Main shirt sponsor: TVS Eurogrip
- Back shirt sponsor: Etihad Airways
- Chest branding: Gulf Oil

== League stage ==
=== Points table ===
| Pos | Grp | Team | Pld | W | L | NR | Pts | NRR | Qualification |
|---|---|---|---|---|---|---|---|---|---|
| 1 | A | Kolkata Knight Riders (C) | 14 | 9 | 3 | 2 | 20 | 1.428 | Advanced to Qualifier 1 |
| 2 | B | Sunrisers Hyderabad (R) | 14 | 8 | 5 | 1 | 17 | 0.414 | Advanced to Qualifier 1 |
| 3 | A | Rajasthan Royals (3rd) | 14 | 8 | 5 | 1 | 17 | 0.273 | Advanced to Eliminator |
| 4 | B | Royal Challengers Bengaluru (4th) | 14 | 7 | 7 | 0 | 14 | 0.459 | Advanced to Eliminator |
| 5 | B | Chennai Super Kings | 14 | 7 | 7 | 0 | 14 | 0.392 | Eliminated |
| 6 | A | Delhi Capitals | 14 | 7 | 7 | 0 | 14 | −0.377 | Eliminated |
| 7 | A | Lucknow Super Giants | 14 | 7 | 7 | 0 | 14 | −0.667 | Eliminated |
| 8 | B | Gujarat Titans | 14 | 5 | 7 | 2 | 12 | −1.063 | Eliminated |
| 9 | B | Punjab Kings | 14 | 5 | 9 | 0 | 10 | −0.353 | Eliminated |
| 10 | A | Mumbai Indians | 14 | 4 | 10 | 0 | 8 | −0.318 | Eliminated |

Source: ESPNcricinfo
(C) Champions; (R) Runners-up

=== League progression ===
League progression
| Team | Group matches | | | | | | | | | | | | | | Playoffs | | |
| Team | 1 | 2 | 3 | 4 | 5 | 6 | 7 | 8 | 9 | 10 | 11 | 12 | 13 | 14 | Q1/E | Q2 | F |
|---|---|---|---|---|---|---|---|---|---|---|---|---|---|---|---|---|---|
| Chennai Super Kings | 2 | 4 | 4 | 4 | 6 | 8 | 8 | 8 | 10 | 10 | 12 | 12 | 14 | 14 | | | |

| Win | Loss | No result |

- Note: The total points at the end of each group match are listed.
- Note: Click on the points (group matches) or W/L (playoffs) to see the match summary.

=== Fixtures and results ===
Match 1
22 March 2024
20:00 (N)
Scorecard

| Royal Challengers Bengaluru; 173/6 (20 overs) | v | Chennai Super Kings (H); 176/4 (18.4 overs) |
| Anuj Rawat 48 (25); Mustafizur Rahman 4/29 (4 overs) | | Rachin Ravindra 37 (15); Cameron Green 2/27 (3 overs) |

Chennai Super Kings won by 6 wickets
M. A. Chidambaram Stadium, Chennai
Umpires: Saiyed Khalid (Ind) and Virender Sharma (Ind)
Player of the match: Mustafizur Rahman (Chennai Super Kings)

- Royal Challengers Bengaluru won the toss and elected to bat.

Match 7
26 March 2024
19:30 (N)
Scorecard

| (H) Chennai Super Kings; 206/6 (20 overs) | v | Gujarat Titans; 143/8 (20 overs) |
| Shivam Dube 51 (23); Rashid Khan 2/49 (4 overs) | | Sai Sudharsan 37 (31); Tushar Deshpande 2/21 (4 overs) |

Chennai Super Kings won by 63 runs
M. A. Chidambaram Stadium, Chennai
Umpires: Tapan Sharma (Ind) and Alex Wharf (Eng)
Player of the match: Shivam Dube (Chennai Super Kings)

- Gujarat Titans won the toss and elected to field.

Match 13
31 March 2024
19:30 (N)
Scorecard

| (H) Delhi Capitals; 191/5 (20 overs) | v | Chennai Super Kings; 171/6 (20 overs) |
| David Warner 52 (35); Matheesha Pathirana 3/31 (4 overs) | | Ajinkya Rahane 45 (30); Mukesh Kumar 3/21 (3 overs) |

Delhi Capitals won by 20 runs
ACA-VDCA Cricket Stadium, Visakhapatnam
Umpires: Kumar Dharmasena (SL) and Vinod Seshan (Ind)
Player of the match: Khaleel Ahmed (Delhi Capitals)

- Delhi Capitals won the toss and elected to bat.

Match 18
5 April 2024
19:30 (N)
Scorecard

| Chennai Super Kings; 165/5 (20 overs) | v | Sunrisers Hyderabad (H); 166/4 (18.1 overs) |
| Shivam Dube 45 (24); Shahbaz Ahmed 1/11 (1 over) | | Aiden Markram 50 (36); Moeen Ali 2/23 (3 overs) |

Sunrisers Hyderabad won by 6 wickets
Rajiv Gandhi International Cricket Stadium, Hyderabad
Umpires: Yeshwant Barde (Ind) and Rohan Pandit (Ind)
Player of the match: Abhishek Sharma (Sunrisers Hyderabad)

- Sunrisers Hyderabad won the toss and elected to field.

Match 22
8 April 2024
19:30 (N)
Scorecard

| Kolkata Knight Riders; 137/9 (20 overs) | v | Chennai Super Kings (H); 141/3 (17.4 overs) |
| Shreyas Iyer 34 (32); Ravindra Jadeja 3/18 (4 overs) | | Ruturaj Gaikwad 67* (58); Vaibhav Arora 2/28 (4 overs) |

Chennai Super Kings won by 7 wickets
M. A. Chidambaram Stadium, Chennai
Umpires: Anil Chaudhary (Ind) and Saidharshan Kumar (Ind)
Player of the match: Ravindra Jadeja (Chennai Super Kings)

- Chennai Super Kings won the toss and elected to field.

Match 29
14 April 2024
19:30 (N)
Scorecard

| Chennai Super Kings; 206/4 (20 overs) | v | Mumbai Indians (H); 186/6 (20 overs) |
| Ruturaj Gaikwad 69 (40); Hardik Pandya 2/43 (3 overs) | | Rohit Sharma 105* (63); Matheesha Pathirana 4/28 (4 overs) |

Chennai Super Kings won by 20 runs
Wankhede Stadium, Mumbai
Umpires: Saiyed Khalid (Ind) and Nitin Menon (Ind)
Player of the match: Matheesha Pathirana (Chennai Super Kings)

- Mumbai Indians won the toss and elected to field.

Match 34
19 April 2024
19:30 (N)
Scorecard

| Chennai Super Kings; 176/6 (20 overs) | v | Lucknow Super Giants (H); 180/2 (19 overs) |
| Ravindra Jadeja 57* (40); Krunal Pandya 2/16 (3 overs) | | KL Rahul 82 (53); Matheesha Pathirana 1/29 (4 overs) |

Lucknow Super Giants won by 8 wickets
BRSABV Ekana Cricket Stadium, Lucknow
Umpires: Anil Chaudhary (Ind) and Rohan Pandit (Ind)
Player of the match: KL Rahul (Lucknow Super Giants)

- Lucknow Super Giants won the toss and elected to field.

Match 39
23 April 2024
19:30 (N)
Scorecard

| (H) Chennai Super Kings; 210/4 (20 overs) | v | Lucknow Super Giants; 213/4 (19.3 overs) |
| Ruturaj Gaikwad 108* (60); Matt Henry 1/28 (4 overs) | | Marcus Stoinis 124* (63); Matheesha Pathirana 2/35 (4 overs) |

Lucknow Super Giants won by 6 wickets
M. A. Chidambaram Stadium, Chennai
Umpires: Nikhil Patwardhan (Ind) and Tapan Sharma (Ind)
Player of the match: Marcus Stoinis (Lucknow Super Giants)

- Lucknow Super Giants won the toss and elected to field.

Match 46
28 April 2024
19:30 (N)
Scorecard

| (H) Chennai Super Kings; 212/3 (20 overs) | v | Sunrisers Hyderabad; 134 (18.5 overs) |
| Ruturaj Gaikwad 98 (54); Bhuvneshwar Kumar 1/38 (4 overs); Jaydev Unadkat 1/38 (4 overs) | | Aiden Markram 32 (26); Tushar Deshpande 4/27 (3 overs) |

Chennai Super Kings won by 78 runs
M. A. Chidambaram Stadium, Chennai
Umpires: Saidharshan Kumar (Ind) and Rohan Pandit (Ind)
Player of the match: Ruturaj Gaikwad (Chennai Super Kings)

- Sunrisers Hyderabad won the toss and elected to field.

Match 49
1 May 2024
19:30 (N)
Scorecard

| (H) Chennai Super Kings; 162/7 (20 overs) | v | Punjab Kings; 163/3 (17.5 overs) |
| Ruturaj Gaikwad 62 (48); Rahul Chahar 2/16 (4 overs) | | Jonny Bairstow 46 (30); Shivam Dube 1/14 (1 over) |

Punjab Kings won by 7 wickets
M. A. Chidambaram Stadium, Chennai
Umpires: Saiyed Khalid (Ind) and Virender Sharma (Ind)
Player of the match: Harpreet Brar (Punjab Kings)

- Punjab Kings won the toss and elected to field.

Match 53
5 May 2024
15:30 (N)
Scorecard

| Chennai Super Kings; 167/9 (20 overs) | v | Punjab Kings (H); 139/9 (20 overs) |
| Ravindra Jadeja 43 (26); Rahul Chahar 3/23 (4 overs) | | Prabhsimran Singh 30 (23); Ravindra Jadeja 3/20 (4 overs) |

Chennai Super Kings won by 28 runs
HPCA Stadium, Dharamshala
Umpires: Nand Kishore (Ind) and Vineet Kulkarni (Ind)
Player of the match: Ravindra Jadeja (Chennai Super Kings)

- Punjab Kings won the toss and elected to field.

Match 59
10 May 2024
19:30 (N)
Scorecard

| (H) Gujarat Titans; 231/3 (20 overs) | v | Chennai Super Kings; 196/8 (20 overs) |
| Shubman Gill 104 (55); Tushar Deshpande 2/33 (4 overs) | | Daryl Mitchell 63 (34); Mohit Sharma 3/31 (4 overs) |

Gujarat Titans won by 35 runs
Narendra Modi Stadium, Ahmedabad
Umpires: K. N. Ananthapadmanabhan (Ind) and Nikhil Patwardhan (Ind)
Player of the match: Shubman Gill (Gujarat Titans)

- Chennai Super Kings won the toss and elected to field.

Match 61
12 May 2024
15:30 (D/N)
Scorecard

| Rajasthan Royals; 141/5 (20 overs) | v | Chennai Super Kings (H); 145/5 (18.2 overs) |
| Riyan Parag 47* (35); Simarjeet Singh 3/26 (4 overs) | | Ruturaj Gaikwad 42* (41); Ravichandran Ashwin 2/35 (4 overs) |

Chennai Super Kings won by 5 wickets
M. A. Chidambaram Stadium, Chennai
Umpires: Yeshwant Barde (Ind) and Rohan Pandit (Ind)
Player of the match: Simarjeet Singh (Chennai Super Kings)

- Rajasthan Royals won the toss and elected to bat.

Match 68
18 May 2024
19:30 (N)
Scorecard

| (H) Royal Challengers Bengaluru; 218/5 (20 overs) | v | Chennai Super Kings; 191/7 (20 overs) |
| Faf du Plessis 54 (39); Shardul Thakur 2/61 (4 overs) | | Rachin Ravindra 61 (37); Yash Dayal 2/42 (4 overs) |

Royal Challengers Bengaluru won by 27 runs
M. Chinnaswamy Stadium, Bengaluru
Umpires: K. N. Ananthapadmanabhan (Ind) and Akshay Totre (Ind)
Player of the match: Faf du Plessis (Royal Challengers Bengaluru)

- Chennai Super Kings won the toss and elected to field.
- Royal Challengers Bengaluru qualified for the playoffs while Chennai Super Kings were eliminated from the playoffs as a result of this match.

== Statistics ==
=== Most runs ===
| Runs | Player | Innings | Highest score | Batting average |
|---|---|---|---|---|
| 583 | Ruturaj Gaikwad | 14 | 108not out | 53.00 |
| 396 | Shivam Dube | 14 | 66 not out | 36.00 |
| 318 | Daryl Mitchell | 13 | 63 | 28.90 |
| 267 | Ravindra Jadeja | 11 | 57 not out | 44.50 |
| 242 | Ajinkya Rahane | 12 | 45 | 20.16 |

Source: ESPNcricinfo |}

=== Most wickets ===
| Wickets | Player | Innings | Overs | Runs conceded | Best bowling | Bowling average |
|---|---|---|---|---|---|---|
| 17 | Tushar Deshpande | 13 | 48 | 424 | 4/27 | 24.94 |
| 14 | Mustafizur Rahman | 9 | 34.2 | 318 | 4/29 | 22.71 |
| 13 | Matheesha Pathirana | 6 | 22 | 169 | 4/28 | 13.00 |
| 8 | Ravindra Jadeja | 14 | 47 | 369 | 3/18 | 46.12 |
| 5 | Simarjeet Singh | 4 | 12 | 121 | 3/26 | 24.20 |

- Source: ESPNcricinfo

|}
