= 2023 Chennai Super Kings season =

Indian cricket team season

Chennai Super Kings
2023 season
- Coach: Stephen Fleming
- Captain: Mahendra Singh Dhoni
- Ground(s): M. A. Chidambaram Stadium, Chennai
- Indian Premier League: Champions (5th titles)
- Most runs: Devon Conway (672)
- Most wickets: Tushar Deshpande (21)
- Most catches: Ruturaj Gaikwad (17)

The 2023 season was the 14th season for the Indian Premier League franchise Chennai Super Kings. They are one of ten teams that competed in the 2023 Indian Premier League. The team have won the IPL title four times. This team qualified for the final of IPL 2023 for the 10th time. Chennai Super Kings won their 5th IPL Title after defeating Gujarat Titans in the rain affected 2023 Indian Premier League final.

== Squad ==
- Players with international caps are listed in **bold**.
- Ages are given as of 31 March 2023, the date of the first match of the season

No.	Name	Nationality	Birth date	Batting style	Bowling style	Year signed	Notes
Captain
7	**MS Dhoni**	India	7 July 1981 (aged 41)	Right-handed	Right-arm medium	2018	Wicket-keeper
Batters
9	**Ambati Rayudu**	India	23 September 1985 (aged 37)	Right-handed	Right-arm off break	2018	
21	**Ajinkya Rahane**	India	6 June 1988 (aged 34)	Right-handed	Right-arm off spin	2023	
88	**Devon Conway**	New Zealand	8 July 1991 (aged 31)	Left-handed	Right-arm medium	2022	Overseas; Wicket-keeper
30	Subhranshu Senapati	India	30 December 1996 (aged 26)	Right-handed	Right-arm medium	2022	
31	**Ruturaj Gaikwad**	India	31 January 1997 (aged 26)	Right-handed	Right-arm off break	2019	
66	Shaik Rasheed	India	24 September 2004 (aged 18)	Right-handed	Right-arm Leg spin	2023	
All-rounders
18	**Moeen Ali**	England	18 June 1987 (aged 35)	Left-handed	Right-arm off break	2021	Overseas
8	**Ravindra Jadeja**	India	6 December 1988 (aged 34)	Left-handed	Left-arm slow orthodox	2018	
29	**Dwaine Pretorius**	South Africa	29 March 1989 (aged 34)	Right-handed	Right-arm medium	2022	Overseas
55	**Ben Stokes**	England	4 June 1991 (aged 31)	Left-handed	Right-arm fast-medium	2023	Overseas
74	**Mitchell Santner**	New Zealand	5 February 1992 (aged 31)	Left-handed	Left-arm slow orthodox	2018	Overseas
25	**Shivam Dube**	India	26 June 1993 (aged 29)	Left-handed	Right-arm medium	2022	
19	Ajay Mandal	India	25 February 1996 (aged 27)	Left-handed	Left-arm slow orthodox	2023	
28	Bhagath Varma	India	21 September 1998 (aged 24)	Right-handed	Right-arm Off-break	2021	
10	Rajvardhan Hangargekar	India	10 November 2002 (aged 20)	Right-handed	Right-arm fast-medium	2022	
27	Nishant Sindhu	India	9 April 2004 (aged 18)	Left-handed	Left-arm slow orthodox	2023	
Spin bowlers
46	Prashant Solanki	India	22 February 2000 (aged 23)	Right-handed	Right-arm leg spin	2022	
61	**Maheesh Theekshana**	Sri Lanka	1 August 2000 (aged 22)	Right-handed	Right-arm off break	2022	Overseas
Pace bowlers
58	**Sisanda Magala**	South Africa	7 January 1991 (aged 32)	Right-handed	Right-arm fast	2023	Overseas
90	**Deepak Chahar**	India	7 August 1992 (aged 30)	Right-handed	Right-arm medium-fast	2018	
12	**Kyle Jamieson**	New Zealand	30 December 1994 (aged 28)	Right-handed	Right-arm Fast	2023	Overseas
24	Tushar Deshpande	India	15 May 1995 (aged 27)	Left-handed	Right-arm medium	2022	
33	Mukesh Choudhary	India	6 July 1996 (aged 26)	Left-handed	Left-arm medium-fast	2022	
17	Simarjeet Singh	India	17 January 1998 (aged 25)	Right-handed	Right-arm medium-fast	2022	
26	Akash Singh	India	26 April 2002 (aged 20)	Right-handed	Left-arm medium-fast	2023	
81	**Matheesha Pathirana**	Sri Lanka	18 December 2002 (aged 20)	Right-handed	Right-arm fast	2022	Overseas

== Administration and support staff ==
Position	Name
CEO	Kasinath Viswanathan
Team manager	Russell Radhakrishnan
Consultant	Sundar Raman
Head coach	Stephen Fleming
Batting coach	Michael Hussey
Bowling coach	Dwayne Bravo
Fielding coach	Rajiv Kumar

- Source: Chennai Super Kings

== Matches ==
=== League stage ===
The schedule for the group stages was published on 17 February 2023.

Match 1
31 March 2023
19:30 (N)
Scorecard

Chennai Super Kings; 178/7 (20 overs)	v	Gujarat Titans (H); 182/5 (19.2 overs)
Ruturaj Gaikwad 92 (50); Rashid Khan 2/26 (4 overs)		Shubman Gill 63 (36); Rajvardhan Hangargekar 3/36 (4 overs)

Gujarat Titans won by 5 wickets
Narendra Modi Stadium, Ahmedabad
Umpires: Saiyed Khalid (Ind) and Nitin Menon (Ind)
Player of the match: Rashid Khan (Gujarat Titans)

- Gujarat Titans won the toss and elected to field.
- Tushar Deshpande for Ambati Rayudu (Chennai Super Kings) and Sai Sudharsan for Kane Williamson (Gujarat Titans) were the first Impact Players to be used in the IPL.

Match 6
3 April 2023
19:30 (N)
Scorecard

(H) Chennai Super Kings; 217/7 (20 overs)	v	Lucknow Super Giants; 205/7 (20 overs)
Ruturaj Gaikwad 57 (31); Ravi Bishnoi 3/28 (4 overs)		Kyle Mayers 53 (22); Moeen Ali 4/26 (4 overs)

Chennai Super Kings won by 12 runs
M. A. Chidambaram Stadium, Chennai
Umpires: Bruce Oxenford (Aus) and Akshay Totre (Ind)
Player of the match: Moeen Ali (Chennai Super Kings)

- Lucknow Super Giants won the toss and elected to field.

Match 12
8 April 2023
19:30 (N)
Scorecard

(H) Mumbai Indians; 157/8 (20 overs)	v	Chennai Super Kings; 159/3 (18.1 overs)
Ishan Kishan 32 (21); Ravindra Jadeja 3/20 (4 overs)		Ajinkya Rahane 61 (27); Kumar Kartikeya 1/24 (4 overs)

Chennai Super Kings won by 7 wickets
Wankhede Stadium, Mumbai
Umpires: Chris Gaffaney (NZ) and Nikhil Patwardhan (Ind)
Player of the match: Ravindra Jadeja (Chennai Super Kings)

- Chennai Super Kings won the toss and elected to field.

Match 17
12 April 2023
19:30 (N)
Scorecard

Rajasthan Royals; 175/8 (20 overs)	v	Chennai Super Kings (H); 172/6 (20 overs)
Jos Buttler 52 (36); Ravindra Jadeja 2/21 (4 overs)		Devon Conway 50 (38); Ravichandran Ashwin 2/25 (4 overs)

Rajasthan Royals won by 3 runs
M. A. Chidambaram Stadium, Chennai
Umpires: Virender Sharma (Ind) and Vinod Seshan (Ind)
Player of the match: Ravichandran Ashwin (Rajasthan Royals)

- Chennai Super Kings won the toss and elected to field.

Match 24
17 April 2023
19:30 (N)
Scorecard

Chennai Super Kings; 226/6 (20 overs)	v	Royal Challengers Bangalore (H); 218/8 (20 overs)
Devon Conway 83 (45); Wanindu Hasaranga 1/21 (2 overs)		Glenn Maxwell 76 (36); Tushar Deshpande 3/45 (4 overs)

Chennai Super Kings won by 8 runs
M. Chinnaswamy Stadium, Bengaluru
Umpires: K. N. Ananthapadmanabhan (Ind) and Navdeep Singh (Ind)
Player of the match: Devon Conway (Chennai Super Kings)

- Royal Challengers Bangalore won the toss and elected to field.

Match 29
21 April 2023
19:30 (N)
Scorecard

Sunrisers Hyderabad; 134/7 (20 overs)	v	Chennai Super Kings (H); 138/3 (18.4 overs)
Abhishek Sharma 34 (26); Ravindra Jadeja 3/22 (4 overs)		Devon Conway 77* (57); Mayank Markande 2/23 (4 overs)

Chennai Super Kings won by 7 wickets
M. A. Chidambaram Stadium, Chennai
Umpires: Saiyed Khalid (Ind) and Virender Sharma (Ind)
Player of the match: Ravindra Jadeja (Chennai Super Kings)

- Chennai Super Kings won the toss and elected to field.

Match 33
23 April 2023
19:30 (N)
Scorecard

Chennai Super Kings; 235/4 (20 overs)	v	Kolkata Knight Riders (H); 186/8 (20 overs)
Ajinkya Rahane 71* (29); Kulwant Khejroliya 2/44 (3 overs)		Jason Roy 61 (26); Maheesh Theekshana 2/32 (4 overs)

Chennai Super Kings won by 49 runs
Eden Gardens, Kolkata
Umpires: Nitin Menon (Ind) and Tapan Sharma (Ind)
Player of the match: Ajinkya Rahane (Chennai Super Kings)

- Kolkata Knight Riders won the toss and elected to field.

Match 37
27 April 2023
19:30 (N)
Scorecard

(H) Rajasthan Royals; 202/5 (20 overs)	v	Chennai Super Kings; 170/6 (20 overs)
Yashasvi Jaiswal 77 (43); Tushar Deshpande 2/42 (4 overs)		Shivam Dube 52 (33); Adam Zampa 3/22 (3 overs)

Rajasthan Royals won by 32 runs
Sawai Mansingh Stadium, Jaipur
Umpires: Yeshwant Barde (Ind) and Akshay Totre (Ind)
Player of the match: Yashasvi Jaiswal (Rajasthan Royals)

- Rajasthan Royals won the toss and elected to bat.

Match 41
30 April 2023
15:30 (D/N)
Scorecard

(H) Chennai Super Kings; 200/4 (20 overs)	v	Punjab Kings; 201/6 (20 overs)
Devon Conway 92* (52); Sikandar Raza 1/31 (3 overs)		Prabhsimran Singh 42 (24); Tushar Deshpande 3/49 (4 overs)

Punjab Kings won by 4 wickets
M. A. Chidambaram Stadium, Chennai
Umpires: Ulhas Gandhe (Ind) and Rod Tucker (Aus)
Player of the match: Devon Conway (Chennai Super Kings)

- Chennai Super Kings won the toss and elected to bat.

Match 45
3 May 2023
15:30 (D/N)
Scorecard

(H) Lucknow Super Giants; 125/7 (19.2 overs)	v	Chennai Super Kings
Ayush Badoni 59* (33); Moeen Ali 2/13 (4 overs)

No result
BRSABV Ekana Cricket Stadium, Lucknow
Umpires: Anil Chaudhary (Ind) and Nikhil Patwardhan (Ind)

- Chennai Super Kings won the toss and elected to field.
- No further play was possible due to rain.
- The match was shifted from May 4 to May 3 due to the Lucknow Municipal Corporation elections.

Match 49
6 May 2023
15:30 (D/N)
Scorecard

Mumbai Indians; 139/8 (20 overs)	v	Chennai Super Kings (H); 140/4 (17.4 overs)
Nehal Wadhera 64 (51); Matheesha Pathirana 3/15 (4 overs)		Devon Conway 44 (42); Piyush Chawla 2/25 (4 overs)

Chennai Super Kings won by 6 wickets
M. A. Chidambaram Stadium, Chennai
Umpires: Bruce Oxenford (Aus) and Navdeep Singh (Ind)
Player of the match: Matheesha Pathirana (Chennai Super Kings)

- Chennai Super Kings won the toss and elected to field.
- Raghav Goyal (Mumbai Indians) made his T20 debut.

Match 55
10 May 2023
19:30 (N)
Scorecard

(H) Chennai Super Kings; 167/8 (20 overs)	v	Delhi Capitals; 140/8 (20 overs)
Shivam Dube 25 (12); Mitchell Marsh 3/18 (3 overs)		Rilee Rossouw 35 (37); Matheesha Pathirana 3/37 (4 overs)

Chennai Super Kings won by 27 runs
M. A. Chidambaram Stadium, Chennai
Umpires: Chris Gaffaney (NZ) and Nikhil Patwardhan (Ind)
Player of the match: Ravindra Jadeja (Chennai Super Kings)

- Chennai Super Kings won the toss and elected to bat.

Match 61
14 May 2023
19:30 (N)
Scorecard

(H) Chennai Super Kings; 144/6 (20 overs)	v	Kolkata Knight Riders; 147/4 (18.3 overs)
Shivam Dubey 48* (34); Sunil Narine 2/15 (4 overs)		Nitish Rana 57* (44); Deepak Chahar 3/27 (3 overs)

Kolkata Knight Riders won by 6 wickets
M. A. Chidambaram Stadium, Chennai
Umpires: Tapan Sharma (Ind) and Vinod Seshan (Ind)
Player of the match: Rinku Singh (Kolkata Knight Riders)

- Chennai Super Kings won the toss and elected to bat.

Match 67
20 May 2023
15:30 (D/N)
Scorecard

Chennai Super Kings; 223/3 (20 overs)	v	Delhi Capitals (H); 146/9 (20 overs)
Devon Conway 87 (52); Chetan Sakariya 1/36 (4 overs)		David Warner 86 (58); Deepak Chahar 3/22 (4 overs)

Chennai Super Kings won by 77 runs
Arun Jaitley Stadium, Delhi
Umpires: Chris Gaffaney (NZ) and Nikhil Patwardhan (Ind)
Player of the match: Ruturaj Gaikwad (Chennai Super Kings)

- Chennai Super Kings won the toss and elected to bat.
- Chennai Super Kings qualified for the playoffs as a result of this match.

== Playoffs ==
=== Qualifier 1 ===
23 May 2023
19:30 (N)
Scorecard

Chennai Super Kings; 172/7 (20 overs)	v	Gujarat Titans; 157 (20 overs)
Ruturaj Gaikwad 60 (44); Mohammed Shami 2/28 (4 overs)		Shubman Gill 42 (38); Ravindra Jadeja 2/18 (4 overs)

Chennai Super Kings won by 15 runs
M. A. Chidambaram Stadium, Chennai
Umpires: Anil Chaudhary (Ind) and Chris Gaffaney (NZ)
Player of the match: Ruturaj Gaikwad (Chennai Super Kings)

- Gujarat Titans won the toss and elected to field.
- Chennai Super Kings qualified for the final for the 10th time in IPL history.

== Final ==
29 May 2023
19:30 (N)
Scorecard

Gujarat Titans; 214/4 (20 overs)	v	Chennai Super Kings; 171/5 (15 overs)
Sai Sudharsan 96 (47); Matheesha Pathirana 2/44 (4 overs)		Devon Conway 47 (25); Mohit Sharma 3/36 (3 overs)

Chennai Super Kings won by 5 wickets (DLS method)
Narendra Modi Stadium, Ahmedabad
Umpires: Nitin Menon (Ind) and Rod Tucker (Aus)
Player of the match: Devon Conway (Chennai Super Kings)

- Chennai Super Kings won the toss and elected to field.
- The match was scheduled to be held on 28 May, but was pushed to 29 May owing to rain. It ended on 30 May at 01:35 IST, thus, becoming the longest ever IPL final. (Note: It was the first IPL in history which had a reserved day and the game held on it)
- Chennai Super Kings were set a revised target of 171 runs from 15 overs due to rain.
- By winning in the final, Chennai Super Kings equalled Mumbai Indians for winning the most IPL trophies (5).

== Statistics ==
=== Most runs ===
No.	Name	Match	Inns	NO	Runs	HS	Ave.	BF	SR	100s	50s	0	4s	6s
1	Devon Conway	16	15	2	672	92*	51.69	481	139.70	0	6	1	77	18
2	Ruturaj Gaikwad	16	15	1	590	92	42.14	400	147.50	0	4	0	46	30
3	Shivam Dube	16	14	3	418	52	38.00	264	158.33	0	3	0	12	35
4	Ajinkya Rahane	14	11	1	326	71*	32.60	189	172.48	0	2	0	24	16
5	Ravindra Jadeja	16	12	4	190	25*	23.75	133	142.85	0	0	0	11	9

=== Most wickets ===
No.	Name	Match	Inns	Overs	Maidens	Runs	Wickets	BBI	Ave.	Econ.	SR	4W	5W
1	Tushar Deshpande	16	16	56.5	0	564	21	3/45	26.85	9.95	16.23	0	0
2	Ravindra Jadeja	16	16	57.0	0	431	20	3/20	21.55	7.56	17.10	0	0
3	Matheesha Pathirana	12	12	46.2	0	376	19	3/15	19.52	8.00	14.63	0	0
4	Deepak Chahar	10	10	34.0	0	297	13	3/22	22.84	8.73	15.69	0	0
5	Maheesh Theekshana	13	13	49.0	0	392	11	2/23	35.63	8.00	26.72	0	0
