= Colombo Kaps =

Colombo based franchise cricket team of the Lanka Premier League

- League: Lanka Premier League

Personnel
- Captain: Kamindu Mendis
- Coach: Chamara Kapugedara
- Owner: Witness Sports Alliance

Team information
- City: Colombo, Western Province, Sri Lanka
- Colours: Yellow
- Founded: 2020: Colombo Kings; 2021: Colombo Stars; 2023: Colombo Strikers; 2025: Colombo Kaps
- Home ground: R. Premadasa Stadium, Colombo
- Capacity: 35,000

History
- LPL wins: 0
T20I kit

Colombo Kaps, formerly known as Colombo Stars, Colombo Kings and Colombo Strikers, is a franchise Twenty20 cricket team based in Colombo, Sri Lanka, that competes in the Lanka Premier League. Kusal Mendis is the captain of this franchise while Chamara Kapugedara is the head coach.

== Franchise history ==
=== 2020 season ===
In the inaugural season, Murfad Mustafa was the owner of the franchise. The team was supposed to be coached by former Australian cricketer Dav Whatmore. However he pulled out ahead of the 2020 Lanka Premier League for personal reasons and was replaced by former English cricketer Kabir Ali. Kabir Ali was again replaced by Herschelle Gibbs after he tested positive for COVID-19. Angelo Mathews was announced as the icon player and Andre Russell was named as the marquee foreign player.

=== 2021 season ===
In June 2021, Sri Lanka Cricket (SLC) terminated the franchise ahead of the 2021 Lanka Premier League, due to financial issues. In November 2021, the team changed its name to Colombo Stars after Softlogic Holdings PLC took over the ownership of the franchise.

=== 2023 season ===
In May 2023, LPL promoter and the chairman of IPG Group told that Softlogic Holdings PLC had part ways with Colombo Stars with mutual understanding. In May 2023, the team changed its name to Colombo Strikers after SKKY Group took over the ownership.

=== 2026 season ===
In April 2025, Sri Lanka Cricket (SLC) announced that franchise owners had been terminated ahead of the 2025 Lanka Premier League due to their failure to fulfill the obligations of a team owner in the Lanka Premier League. In mid-October 2025, it was announced that the Colombo franchise had been purchased by Witness Sports Alliance LLC, led by Indian entrepreneurs Saranyan Palaniswamy and K.C. Shyam Kangayan, and the franchise was renamed as "Colombo Kaps".

Before the 2026 player draft, the Mendis duo, Kusal Mendis and Kamindu Mendis, Jimmy Neesham and Ben McDermott signed with the Kaps as pre-draft signings. Chamara Kapugedera and Nuwan Kulasekara were appointed as the head coach and the bowling coach respectively.

== Current squad ==
No.	Name	Nat.	Date of birth	Batting style	Bowling style	Year signed	Salary (US$)	Category	Notes
Batters
2	Thanuka Dabare	(Sri Lanka)	20 August 1998 (age 28)	Left handed	Right-arm off break	2026	20,000	Local Classic	
Wicket-keepers
83	**Rubin Hermann**	(South Africa)	26 January 1997 (age 29)	Left handed	—N/a	2026	20,000	Overseas Classic	Replacement for Mohammad Haris
28	**Ben McDermott**	(Australia)	12 December 1994 (age 31)	Right handed	Right-arm medium fast	2026	60,000	Overseas Star	
23	**Sadeera Samarawickrama**	(Sri Lanka)	30 August 1995 (age 31)	Right handed	—N/a	2026	30,000	Local Gold	**Vice Captain**
25	Sharujan Shanmuganathan	(Sri Lanka)	25 April 2006 (age 20)	Right handed	Right-arm leg break	2026	10,000	Emerging U23	
All-rounders
19	**Ashen Bandara**	(Sri Lanka)	23 November 1998 (age 27)	Right handed	Right-arm leg break	2026	80,000	Local Icon	Replacement for Kusal Mendis
14	**Kushal Bhurtel**	(Nepal)	22 January 1997 (age 29)	Right handed	Right-arm leg break	2026	15,000	Associate Star	
95	**Janith Liyanage**	(Sri Lanka)	12 July 1995 (age 31)	Right handed	Right-arm medium fast	2026	30,000	Local Gold	
21	**Kamindu Mendis**	(Sri Lanka)	30 September 1998 (age 28)	Left handed	Ambidextrous spin	2026	60,000	Local Star	**Captain**
50	**James Neesham**	(New Zealand)	17 September 1990 (age 36)	Left handed	Right-arm medium fast	2026	80,000	Overseas Icon	
37	**Milan Rathnayake**	(Sri Lanka)	1 August 1996 (age 30)	Left handed	Right-arm medium fast	2026	30,000	Local Gold	
51	Movin Subasingha	(Sri Lanka)	6 July 2000 (age 26)	Right handed	Right-arm off break	2026	20,000	Local Classic	
10	Malsha Tharupathi	(Sri Lanka)	7 November 2004 (age 22)	Right handed	Right-arm leg break	2026	10,000	Emerging U23	
29	**Ravindu Fernando**	(Sri Lanka)	3 November 1999 (age 27)	Right handed	Right-arm off break	2026	20,000	Local Classic	Replacement for Jeffrey Vandersay
Pace bowlers
45	**Shahnawaz Dahani**	(Pakistan)	5 August 1998 (age 28)	Right handed	Right-arm medium fast	2026	30,000	Overseas Gold	
71	**Binura Fernando**	(Sri Lanka)	12 July 1995 (age 31)	Right handed	Left-arm medium fast	2026	50,000	Local Platinum	
24	**Ripon Mondol**	(Bangladesh)	21 March 2003 (age 23)	Right handed	Right-arm medium fast	2026	20,000	Overseas Classic	Replacement for Hasan Mahmud
69	Arul Pragasam	(Sri Lanka)	6 November 1993 (age 33)	Right handed	Right-arm medium fast	2026	20,000	Local Classic	
Spin bowlers
99	**Crishan Kalugamage**	(Italy)	16 June 1991 (age 35)	Right handed	Right-arm leg break	2026	15,000	Associate Star	Playing until Kushal Bhurtel is unavailable.
5	Wanuja Sahan	(Sri Lanka)	17 June 2003 (age 23)	Left handed	Slow left-arm orthodox	2026	30,000	Local Gold	
7	**Mujeeb Ur Rahman**	(Afghanistan)	28 March 2001 (age 25)	Right handed	Right-arm off break	2026	50,000	Overseas Platinum	
Source(s) | ThePapare, Inside Sport & Sri Lanka Cricket

== Administration and support staff ==
Position	Name
Head coach	Chamara Kapugedera
Bowling coach	Nuwan Kulasekara
Assistant coach	Vacant

=== History ===
Season	Head coach	Assistant coach
2020	Herschelle Gibbs	Rangana Herath
2021	Ruwan Kalpage	Trevin Mathew
2022	Ruwan Kalpage	Chamila Gamage
2023	Simon Helmot	Jerome Jayaratne
2024	Carl Crowe	Simon Helmot
2026	Chamara Kapugedera	Nuwan Kulasekara

== Captains ==
As of 05 August 2026

No.	Player	From	To	Mat	Won	Lost	Tie&W	Tie&L	NR	Win%
1	Angelo Mathews (Sri Lanka)	2020	2022	24	13	10	1	0	0	54.16
2	Dhananjaya de Silva (Sri Lanka)	2021	2021	4	1	3	0	0	0	25.00
3	Niroshan Dickwella (Sri Lanka)	2023	2023	5	2	3	0	0	0	40.00
4	Chamika Karunaratne (Sri Lanka)	2023	2023	2	1	1	0	0	0	50.00
5	Babar Azam (Pakistan)	2023	2023	1	0	1	0	0	0	0
6	Thisara Perera (Sri Lanka)	2024	2024	9	4	5	0	0	0	44.44
7	Kusal Mendis (Sri Lanka)	2026	2026	2	1	1	0	0	0	50.00
8	Kamindu Mendis (Sri Lanka)	2026	2026	8	4	4	0	0	0	50.00

- Source: Cricinfo

== Seasons ==
Year	League table standing	Final standing
2020	1st out of 5	Playoffs
2021	3rd out of 5	Playoffs
2022	3rd out of 5	Runners up
2023	5th out of 5	League Stage
2024	3rd out of 5	Playoffs
2026	3rd out of 5	Playoffs

== Statistics ==
=== By season ===
Season	Pld	W	L	NR	Win%	Pos.	Summary	Most runs	Most wickets
2020	9	6	3	0	66.67	1/5	Playoffs	Laurie Evans (289)	Qais Ahmad (12)
2021	9	4	5	0	44.44	3/5	Playoffs	Dinesh Chandimal (277)	Seekkuge Prasanna & Dushmantha Chameera (13)
2022	11	5	6	0	45.45	3/5	Runners-up	Dinesh Chandimal (287)	Kasun Rajitha (13)
2023	8	3	5	0	37.50	5/5	League Stage	Babar Azam (261)	Matheesha Pathirana (12)
2024	9	4	5	0	44.44	3/5	Playoffs	Glenn Phillips (252)	Shadab Khan (17)
2026	10	5	5	0	33.33	3/5	Playoffs	Kamindu Mendis (280)	Mujeeb Ur Rahman (13)
Total	56	27	29	0	48.21		0 Title	Dinesh Chandimal (810)	Matheesha Pathirana (27)

- Source: Cricinfo

=== Most runs ===
As of 07 August 2026

Runs	Player	Seasons
810	Dinesh Chandimal (Sri Lanka)	2020–2022
473	Angelo Mathews (Sri Lanka)	2020–2022
324	Sadeera Samarawickrama (Sri Lanka)	2024-2026
289	Laurie Evans (England)	2020
280	Kamindu Mendis (Sri Lanka)	2026
261	Babar Azam (Pakistan)	2023
253	Ben McDermott (Australia)	2026
252	Glenn Phillips (New Zealand)	2024
249	Pathum Nissanka (Sri Lanka)	2021-2023
245	Ravi Bopara (England)	2022

- Source: Cricinfo

=== Highest individual score ===
As of 11 August 2026

Runs	Player	Opposition	Venue	Date
108*	Laurie Evans (England)	Jaffna Stallions	Hambantota	10 December 2020
104	Babar Azam (Pakistan)	Galle Titans	Pallekele	7 August 2023
88*	Kamindu Mendis (Sri Lanka)	Dambulla Sixers	Dambulla	25 July 2026
80	Dinesh Chandimal (Sri Lanka)	Kandy Tuskers	Dambulla	26 November 2020
79	Kusal Mendis (Sri Lanka)	Galle Gallants	Colombo	18 July 2026

- Source: Cricinfo

=== Most career wickets ===
As of 07 August 2026

Wickets	Player	Seasons
27	Matheesha Pathirana (Sri Lanka)	2023-2024
22	Jeffrey Vandersay (Sri Lanka)	2020–2023
21	Dushmantha Chameera (Sri Lanka)	2020-2021
17	Shadab Khan (Pakistan)	2024
17	Binura Fernando (Sri Lanka)	2024-2026
15	Seekkuge Prasanna (Sri Lanka)	2021-2022
15	Naveen-ul-Haq (Afghanistan)	2021-2022
13	Kasun Rajitha (Sri Lanka)	2022
13	Mujeeb Ur Rahman (Afghanistan)	2026
12	Qais Ahmad (Afghanistan)	2020

- Source: CricInfo

==== Best figures in an innings ====
As of 12 August 2026

Figures	Player	Opposition	Venue	Date
6/25	Jeffrey Vandersay (Sri Lanka)	Kandy Warriors	Colombo	17 December 2021
5/22	Kasun Rajitha (Sri Lanka)	Dambulla Aura	Pallekele	14 December 2022
4/10	Shadab Khan (Pakistan)	Jaffna Kings	Colombo	14 July 2024
4/20	Kasun Rajitha (Sri Lanka)	Kandy Falcons	Colombo	22 December 2022
4/20	Matheesha Pathirana (Sri Lanka)	Galle Marvels	Colombo	15 July 2024

- Source: Cricinfo

== Team identity ==
=== Anthem ===
Year	Anthem	Artist(s)
2020	Say Colombo Kings	Pasan Liyanage, Pradhee, Shaa, Lucky
2021		Romaine Willis, Randhir Witana, Kaizer Kaiz

=== Kit manufacturers and sponsors ===
Year	Kit manufacturer	Shirt sponsor (front)	Shirt sponsor (back)	Chest branding	Sleeve branding
2020	Moose Clothing	Faza.ae	Sport Loop	Maaté	Safco International, 11 Wickets
2021		Softlogic Holdings		—N/a	Softlogic Life Insurance, Odel, Asiri Health
2022		MazaPlay		Softlogic Holdings	Softlogic Life Insurance, Odel, Asiri Health
2023		Kheloyar	1xBook		Mentos
2024		Babu88 Sports	Zetto Sports	Oateo	Turbo Energy Drink, GENXT
2026		Parimatch Sports	—N/a	Kasagala Group	
