= Otara Gunewardene =

Sri Lankan entrepreneur, animal welfare advocate, conservationist and philanthropist

Otara Del Gunewardene
- Born: Otara Del Gunewardene; 30 August 1964 (age 62); Colombo, Sri Lanka
- Education: Ladies' College, Colombo; Bowling Green State University
- Occupation: Entrepreneur
- Organization(s): Founder of ODEL and Embark
- Known for: Animal welfare Environmental conservation
- Notable work: Founding first public retail company in Sri Lanka
- Awards: Zonta Woman of Achievement Award; Entrepreneur of the Year 2001 Award
- Honours: World Animal Day Ambassador – Sri Lanka; Goodwill Ambassador for Habitat for Humanity - Sri Lanka; Ambassador Earth Hour - Sri Lanka
- Website: otara.lk

Otara Gunewardene (Sinhala: ඔටාරා ගුණවර්ධන) is a Sri Lankan entrepreneur, animal welfare advocate, conservationist and philanthropist. She is the founder of ODEL, Embark and Otara Foundation.

== Early life and education ==
Otara Del Gunawardene was born on 30 August 1964 in Colombo, Sri Lanka the third child to Norman and Delysia Gunewardene. Her father was a former Chairman of Aitken Spence and her mother, Delysia, established the Chitra Lane School for disabled children.

Gunawardene attended C. M. S. Ladies College in Colombo, where she excelled in athletics and swimming, representing the country. Gunawardene graduated from Bowling Green State University, Ohio with a degree in biology.

Whilst on holiday back home, she did some fashion modelling – shooting for high-profile brands and international apparel catalogues right after graduating from University.

== Career ==
In 1989, Gunawardene began selling factory surplus garments and apparel from her car boot to family and friends. In 1990 she opened her first store, ODEL, on Dickmans Road in Colombo and by 2010 had eighteen stores throughout Colombo.

In 2007 Gunewardene launched the Otara foundation, a non-profit organisation which focuses on environmental and wildlife conservation of Sri Lanka. In 2007 she also launched the fashion brand, Embark, some of the income from which is donated to fund eradication of rabies, canine vaccinations, sterilisation surgeries, puppy adoptions, and caring for injured street dogs.

In February 2010 she converted ODEL into a public limited liability company and it became the first fashion retail business to be listed on the Colombo Stock Exchange. On 11 September 2014 Gunewardene sold of all her shares in ODEL PLC to the Softlogic Group, to concentrate on Embark.

In 2015 Embark opened its first standalone store in Galle, which was followed by an additional three stores in Kandy City Centre, Bandaranaike International Airport and at Dickmans Road in Colombo. In September 2017 Embark opened its tenth store in K-Zone Ja-Ela.

== Advocacy ==
In 2015, Gunewardene launched a campaign asking the government to enact the proposed Animal Welfare Bill which gained over 100,000 signatures and led to the Cabinet Approval of the said bill at the time. This inspired a trend of creating petitions for social causes in the country. She continues to advocate for the revival and expedient of the Animal Welfare Bill, passing of which is continues to be stagnant.

In 2016, she launched a campaign against the Dehiwala zoo which resulted in the zoo improving the conditions in which wild animals are kept.

In 2020, she launched an online platform, Who We Are, to promote Sri Lankan entrepreneurs and small businesses who sell local, eco-friendly, ethically-sourced, cruelty-free and sustainable products.

== Awards and recognition ==
Gunewardene has achieved wide recognition in Sri Lanka and internationally.

- 2000 - Jaycees’ Most Outstanding Young Person in Sri Lanka
- 2001 - Federation of Chambers and Commerce and Industry of Sri Lanka (FCCISL) Entrepreneur of the Year 2001 Award
- 2002 - Zonta Woman of Achievement Award
- 2007 - Alankara Jewelry, Face of Alankara Brand Ambassador
- 2008 - Inducted into the Dallas-Hamilton Entrepreneurial Hall of Fame, class of 2009 as an outstanding innovator at the Bowling Green State University; South Asian Association for Regional Corporation’s (SAARC) Woman of Achievement; Retail Leadership Award, Asia Retail Congress, India; Woman of Saabstance, Saab Cars, Singapore; World Animal Day, Sri Lankan AmbassadorIn 2008 was bestowed the honour of World Animal Day Ambassador – Sri Lanka
- 2009 - Sri Lankan Goodwill Ambassador for Habitat for Humanity; Colombo Jewellery Stores, Dior Brand Ambassador
- 2010 - Orchid (Dendrobrium Otara) named after her by the Horticultural and Flora Conservation Society of Sri Lanka; Winner 'Best Female Entrepreneur' award at the seventh US Stevie Awards for Women in Business
- 2013 - named Echelon Magazine's 'Most Powerful Woman in Sri Lanka', listed in 'The Sri Lanka Rich List 2013'; her personal website, www.otara.lk won the ‘Best Personal Website’ award for the first time in 2010 conducted by the Lanka Domain Registry Office
- 2014 - Selected and honoured as one of the ‘Prominent Women of the Country’ by the Women’s Parliamentarians’ Caucus, for her achievements in business and for her service to the country; Ambassador Earth Hour Sri Lanka.
- 2017 - 'Passionate 2017' by Business Today.
- 2018 - Woman of the Year Award, Women in Management (WIM) in partnership with IFC, member of the World Bank Group. Featured in LMD’s 2018 A-List of Sri Lankan Top 50 Business People.

== Personal life ==
In 1990, Gunewardene married Raju Chandiram, with whom she had two sons, in 1994 and 2000. The couple separated in 2006. Chandiram served as a senior executive at Odel and following their divorce subsequently served as a Director on the SriLankan Airlines board from May 2005 until March 2008.
