= Embark =

Sri Lankan animal welfare organization

- Formation: 2007; 19 years ago
- Founder: Otara Gunewardene
- Type: Non-profit organisation
- Purpose: Animal welfare, Animal Rescue, Wildlife Conservation, Volunteerism
- Location: Sri Lanka
- Website: embarkpassion.com

Embark is a Sri Lankan animal rescue and welfare organization. Since 2007, Embark has been conducting rescues, adoptions, sterilizations, vaccinations, education programmes and advocacy campaigns for the welfare of homeless dogs, cats and other animals. Embark was founded by the award-winning entrepreneur, conservationist and advocate Otara Gunewardene.

== History ==
In 2007, Gunewardene launched the fashion brand, Embark, income from which has been utilized to conduct vaccinations, sterilizations, adoptions, and medical care for injured street dogs.

In 2015, Embark opened its first standalone store in Galle, followed by an additional three stores in Kandy City Centre, Bandaranaike International Airport and at Dickman's Road in Colombo.

In 2017 Embark opened its tenth store in K-Zone Ja-Ela and 11th store in Kurunegala.

In 2019, Embark opened its 12th store in Kandy.

== Projects ==
Embark conducts "Adoption Days" every weekend to help find homes for homeless puppies and rescued dogs. The dogs are taken care for by registered fosters until adoption day.

Embark rescues dogs on a daily basis and treats them at the Best Care Animal Hospital until recovered. Disabled dogs are given shelter in the hospital for a lifetime. Embark also tends to emergency calls about other animals in need of rescue

Embark's volunteer leadership program, has over 1000 volunteers whose contributions are awarded with an Annual Award Ceremony; the first ceremony was held in 2018 where Maleesha Gunawardana was awarded as The Most Passionate Volunteer and Shenal Burkey in 2019.

Embark conducts school education programs on animal welfare and wildlife conservation to instill compassion in younger generations.

Embark conducts catch-neuter-vaccinate-release programmes to control the homeless dog population and has a pet ambulance that rescues injured street dogs for free.
