= Ratnayaka =

Ratnayaka is a surname. Notable people with the surname include:

- Abeyratne Ratnayaka (1900-1977), Sri Lankan politician
- Madhubahashini Disanayaka Ratnayaka (fl. 1990–2011), Sri Lankan academic and author
- Sagala Ratnayaka (born 1968), Sri Lankan politician
