= 2023 Colombo Strikers season =

Colombo based franchise cricket team in Sri Lanka

Colombo Strikers
2023 season
- Coach: Simon Helmot
- Captain: Niroshan Dickwella
- Most runs: Babar Azam (261)
- Most wickets: Matheesha Pathirana (12)

The Colombo Strikers (abbreviated as CS) is a franchise cricket team which competes in 2023 Lanka Premier League. The team is based in Colombo, Western Province, Sri Lanka. In May 2023, they changed their name to Colombo Strikers after changing the ownership. The team was captained by Niroshan Dickwella and coached by Simon Helmot.

== Standings ==
Pos	Team	Pld	W	L	NR	Pts	NRR
1	Dambulla Aura (R)	8	6	2	0	12	0.793
2	Galle Titans (3rd)	8	4	4	0	8	0.353
3	B-Love Kandy (C)	8	4	4	0	8	0.185
4	Jaffna Kings (4th)	8	3	5	0	6	−0.179
5	Colombo Strikers	8	3	5	0	6	−1.215

Source: ESPN Cricinfo
- The top four teams qualified for the playoffs
- Advance to Qualifier 1
- Advance to Eliminator

== League fixtures ==
Match 1
30 July 2023
19:30 (N)
Scorecard

Jaffna Kings; 173/5 (20 overs)	v	Colombo Strikers; 152 (19.4 overs)
Towhid Hridoy 54 (39); Matheesha Pathirana 1/32 (4 overs)		Niroshan Dickwella 58 (34); Hardus Viljoen 3/31 (4 overs)

Jaffna Kings won by 21 runs
R. Premadasa Stadium, Colombo
Umpires: Gazi Sohel (Ban) and Raveendra Wimalasiri (SL)
Player of the match: Vijayakanth Viyaskanth (Jaffna Kings)

- Colombo Strikers won the toss and elected to field.

Match 3
31 July 2023
19:30 (N)
Scorecard

Colombo Strikers; 157/6 (20 overs)	v	B-Love Kandy; 130/8 (20 overs)
Babar Azam 59 (52); Isuru Udana 3/39 (4 overs)		Angelo Mathews 25 (22); Matheesha Pathirana 3/24 (4 overs)

Colombo Strikers won by 27 runs
R. Premadasa Stadium, Colombo
Umpires: Chandrika Amarasinghe (SL) and Gazi Sohel (Ban)
Player of the match: Babar Azam (Colombo Strikers)

- Colombo Strikers won the toss and elected to bat.

Match 8
5 August 2023
15:00
Scorecard

Dambulla Aura; 192/6 (20 overs)	v	Colombo Strikers; 182/4 (20 overs)
Kusal Mendis 87 (46); Matheesha Pathirana 3/31 (4 overs)		Nuwanidu Fernando 56* (39); Noor Ahmad 2/34 (4 overs)

Dambulla Aura won by 10 runs
Pallekele International Cricket Stadium, Pallekele
Umpires: Ravindra Kottahachchi (SL) and Gazi Sohel (Ban)
Player of the match: Kusal Mendis (Dambulla Aura)

- Colombo Strikers won the toss and elected to field.

Match 10
7 August 2023
15:00
Scorecard

Galle Titans; 188/3 (20 overs)	v	Colombo Strikers; 189/3 (19.5 overs)
Tim Seifert 54* (35); Lakshan Sandakan 1/29 (4 overs)		Babar Azam 104 (59); Tabraiz Shamsi 2/27 (4 overs)

Colombo Strikers won by 7 wickets
Pallekele International Cricket Stadium, Pallekele
Umpires: Kumar Dharmasena (SL) and Prageeth Rambukwella (SL)
Player of the match: Babar Azam (Colombo Strikers)

- Colombo Strikers won the toss and elected to field.

Match 13
8 August 2023
19:30
Scorecard

Colombo Strikers; 146/8 (20 overs)	v	Jaffna Kings; 150/4 (14.3 overs)
Pathum Nissanka 36 (25); Dunith Wellalage 2/9 (3 overs)		Nishan Madushka 46 (32); Naseem Shah 2/22 (3.3 overs)

Jaffna Kings won by 6 wickets
Pallekele International Cricket Stadium, Pallekele
Umpires: Chandrika Amarasinghe (SL) and Lyndon Hannibal (SL)
Player of the match: Dunith Wellalage (Jaffna Kings)

- Colombo Strikers won the toss and elected to bat.

Match 16
12 August 2023
19:30
Scorecard

Dambulla Aura; 166/5 (20 overs)	v	Colombo Strikers; 116 (19.4 overs)
Ben McDermott 69* (46); Matheesha Pathirana 2/36 (4 overs)		Nuwanidu Fernando 21 (20); Hasan Ali 3/16 (4 overs)

Dambulla Aura won by 50 runs
R. Premadasa Stadium, Colombo
Umpires: Lyndon Hannibal (SL) and Ranmore Martinesz (SL)
Player of the match: Ben McDermott (Dambulla Aura)

- Dambulla Aura won the toss and elected to bat.

Match 18
13 August 2023
19:30
Scorecard

Colombo Strikers; 169/9 (20 overs)	v	B-Love Kandy; 160/8 (20 overs)
Pathum Nissanka 51 (38); Wanindu Hasaranga 2/21 (4 overs)		Wanindu Hasaranga 40 (21); Matheesha Pathirana 2/32 (4 overs)

Colombo Strikers won by 9 runs
R. Premadasa Stadium, Colombo
Umpires: Ranmore Martinesz (SL) and Ruchira Palliyaguruge (SL)
Player of the match: Pathum Nissanka (Colombo Strikers)

- Colombo Strikers won the toss and elected to bat.

Match 20
15 August 2023
19:30
Scorecard

Colombo Strikers; 74 (15.4 overs)	v	Galle Titans; 75/2 (8.3 overs)
Nuwanidu Fernando 14 (11); Tabraiz Shamsi 4/20 (4 overs)		Lasith Croospulle 42* (25); Jeffrey Vandersay 1/18 (3 overs)

Galle Titans won by 8 wickets
R. Premadasa Stadium, Colombo
Umpires: Aleem Dar (Pak) and Lyndon Hannibal (SL)
Player of the match: Tabraiz Shamsi (Galle Titans)

- Galle Titans won the toss and elected to field.
