= Venkatram =

Venkatram is a surname. Notable people with the surname include:

- Lalita Venkatram (1909–1992), Indian singer
- M. V. Venkatram (1920–2000), Indian writer
- V. Venkatram (born 1956), Indian cricketer
- H. K. Venkatram (born 1965), Indian violinist
