= Ladies' College, Colombo =

Ladies’ College

Location
- 66 Sir Ernest de Silva mawatha, Colombo 7 Sri Lanka; 6°54′26″N 79°51′27″E

Information
- Type: Independent
- Motto: Latin: Haec Victoria Nostra Fides (Latin) (This is the victory, even our faith - 1 John 5: 4)
- Established: 1900
- Founder: Lilian Nixon
- Chairman of Governors: J. A. Setukavalar
- Principal: Nicole David Wijesinha
- Chaplain: Christy Joseph
- Staff: 120
- Faculty: 156
- Grades: Preschool - 14
- Gender: Girls
- Age: 2 1/2 to 19
- Enrollment: 1897
- Campus size: 4.32 hectares (10.7 acres)
- Campus type: Urban
- Colours: Red and white
- Affiliation: Anglican
- Website: ladiescollege.lk

Ladies' College is a private girls' school in Cinnamon Gardens, Colombo, Sri Lanka, founded on behalf of the Church Missionary Society (CMS) by Lilian Nixon in 1900. The school is managed by the Anglican Church of Ceylon, and falls under the Diocese of Colombo.

== History ==
The college was founded by Lilian Nixon in 1900 on behalf of the CMS. Nixon was a 26‑year old Irish woman and Old Girl of Victoria College, Belfast, and Cheltenham Ladies' College. She graduated with honours in modern literature from the Royal University of Ireland and later studied at Highbury Secondary Training College and the Froebel Institute, London. She was a firm believer in the importance of education for women and, aided by her colleague Elizabeth Whitney, founded the college in a large bungalow in Union Place, Slave Island, Colombo, with two students enrolled. In 1914 Nixon resigned due to ill health and the college was registered as a Grant in Aid school.

She was succeeded as principal by Gwen Opie, who began new buildings for the school. Opie died in 1944 and was buried in General Cemetery Kanatte. Rita Opie took over as acting principal. In 1945, there was a push towards abolition of tuition fees in state-aided denominational schools. Facilities in terms of teachers and equipment would henceforth be determined by the state, which would bear the cost of the running of the school. In 1946, Mabel E. Simon was appointed principal. Simon pushed to set up pre-vocational guidance services that would lead onto vocational guidance to help students find new careers.

On the retirement of Simon, Olive Hitchcock was appointed acting principal in 1964 and she in turn was succeeded by Sirancee Gunawardena in 1968. The decade following her appointment saw a policy of increasing state control. Eight years later, a liberalised economy began to encourage private enterprise. Whilst the need for English was downgraded in state schools, Ladies College continued to view English as a modern living language. English, therefore, remained the medium of instruction in the school.

"The most important fund raising project was in 1975 when the OGA collected money to establish the Department of Vocational Studies. This was to serve both the school and the community. It arose out of a need to cater to students who did not wish to continue at the universities. It also catered to a need in the wider community and society at large – equipping young people with the necessary skills to function effectively in their workplaces."

In 1998 Dr. Sriyanie Miththapala was appointed to succeed Gunawardena. The centenary celebrations in 2000 started on Founders' Day and continued throughout the year with various events.

"In the year 2000 we look back with pride and see an institution so deeply rooted, that it was able to weather the storms of a century. The effects of the changes that are being introduced at present can only be judged by future generations."

Nirmali Wickremasinghe became Principal in 2003 and during her tenure the school produced theatre productions in all three languages, including The Hunchback of Notre Dame and Sister Act 2 in English, a dance drama Draupadi Sabatham, in Tamil and a street theatre production in Sinhalese. Students have travelled abroad to take part in international competitions and exchange programs. New IT facilities were introduced for teachers.

Wickremasinghe also introduced many annual events and sports encounters, such as water polo with Visakha Vidyalaya, hockey with Bishop's College, a regatta with Musaeus College, the Lilian Nixon Interschool Debating Competition, Serendipity, Sinhala Day and Tamil Day. A thematic Wednesday was introduced and religious societies in the school also began to make presentations, fostering a better understanding of each other's religions among pupils.

Under Wickremasinghe's headship, the standard of sports improved greatly due to improved facilities and students have participated at both national and international levels. The building project included a new sports complex to house the badminton, squash courts and gym. The LC Walk was organized to help to fund the sports complex and the building programme has since been enlarged to meet the changing needs of the school. The old Willis Hall is now a three‑storey block of classrooms for the primary school; a new block of classrooms for the London 'A' Levels includes a large cafeteria, rooms for an office and an infirmary downstairs. The new building houses the college archives, the junior library, the bookshop and the table tennis room. Several buildings were refurbished including the hall, the green room, the hostel, the day care centre and the domestic science rooms. During this time the Boxford Building was renovated and transformed to a child friendly nursery. To encourage thrift among the students a savings bank was opened.

== Principals of Ladies' College ==
Name	Qualifications	Year
Lilian Nixon	BA (Trinity College, Dublin)	1900 - 1914
Elizabeth Whitney	BA	1914 - 1917
Gwen Opie	MA, Msc	1917 - 1944
Mabel Simon	BA Cert. Ed.	1946 - 1963
Olive Hitchock	MA Dip. Ed.	1966 - 1968
Sirancee Gunawardana	B.A.	1968 - 1998
Sriyani Miththapala	Ph.D.	1998 - 2003
Nirmali Wickremesinghe	Bsc	2003 - 2013
Eesha Speldewinde	LL.B	2014 - 2021
Deepika Dassenaike	Bachelor of Law, Master of Comparative Jurisprudence	2022 - 2025

== The College Today ==
=== Curriculum ===
The college has developed a multi-ethnic and multi-religious student population. It offers education from pre-school through to the G.C.E. Advanced Level (local and London exams). In addition to English, Maths and Science, London 'A' level options include art and design, business studies, economics, history, law and psychology. Local 'A' level options include Economics, Business Studies, Statistics, Accounting, Classics, English, French, Home Economics and Logic The college also offers a BTEC programme.

=== Houses ===
The college has used the house system since 1925

House	House motto	Emblem
Loos House	The utmost for the highest	A Sri Lankan lotus
Whitney House	Nothing less than the best	A Canadian maple leaf
Nixon House	Excelsior	An Irish shamrock
Dale House	No attainment without effort	A New Zealand fern

The house are named after three early mistresses at the college and a benefactress from New Zealand – Miss Dale. Each house has as its emblem a symbol representing the homeland of the woman whose name it bears.

=== Sports ===
The college has a full intra- and extramural sports programme. Sports offered include; athletics, badminton, basketball, karate, netball, rowing, squash, swimming and diving, tennis and water polo. Pupils have been awarded both Sri Lankan School Colours and Western Province Colours.

== Campus ==
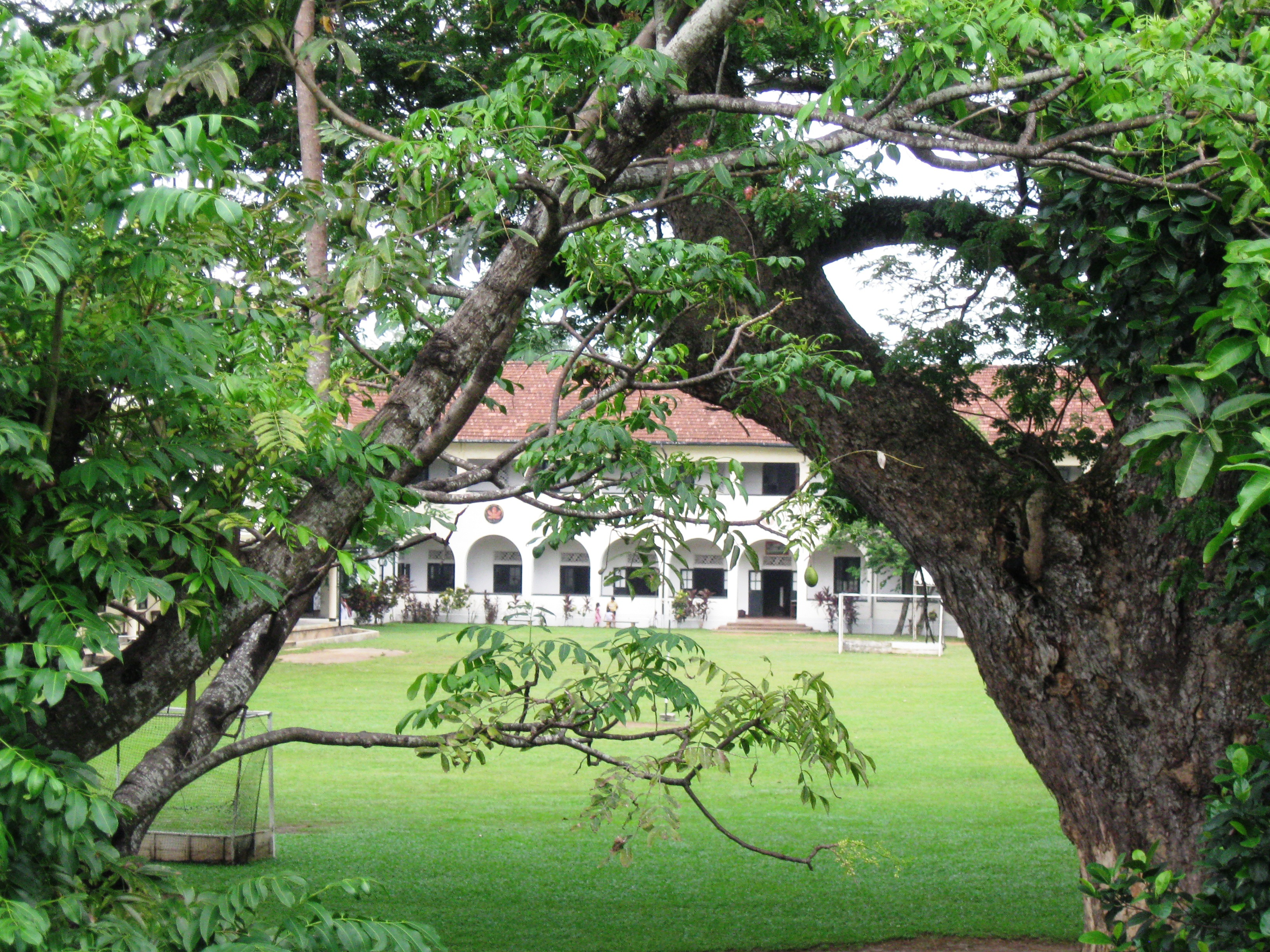
C.M.S. Ladies’ College grounds

The college sits on a 4.32 hectares (10.7 acres) campus close to the Indian Ocean in central Colombo.

The Ladies' College Hall is used for assemblies and school concerts. It is also the regular concert venue of the Symphony Orchestra of Sri Lanka, since 1958.

The foundation stone of the college chapel, called the Chapel of the Hope of the World, was laid on Founders' day 1933. Opie, Rev'd Gaster of the CMS and architect R. G. Booth planned the chapel on the site of the Hanover Villa, bought in 1928 to provide classroom space. The chapel was consecrated on 11 August 1933 and the first school service was held on 7 September in the same year. The chapel is a cruciform building with its high altar at the west end. Architecturally, the building shows influences of Kandyan art and traditional Anglican motifs, while the white pillar capitals portraying decorative foliage, birds and bulls suggest the Byzantine. The walls are pierced with tracery in Moorish style to enhance the lighting. In addition to being a place of worship, the chapel is used for choral performances by present and past pupils, and by the choirs of Colombo.

Ladies’ College was founded by Miss Lillian Nixon as part of her plan to further women's education during a time when women's rights were being advocated. Values like integrity and independence are inculcated in young girls from an early age in order that they may face the future with confidence. This institution has encountered many obstacles during times of war, however, it stands today unscathed as a witness to its capacity to withstand and overcome challenges from external forces.

The school also encourages students to give back to the community when they complete their secondary education. The school has produced students who are notably successful in their respective careers. The Alumni consists of former pupils who are entrepreneurs, authors, writers, educationists, doctors, diplomats and those involved in the media and music industry. These women have contributed their knowledge and expertise to make a change in their country and in the world.

== Notable alumni ==
Name	Notability	Reference
Radhika Coomaraswamy	Under Secretary General United Nations	
Damayanthi Dharsha OLY	Olympic Athlete, Multiple Gold Medalist in Asian Games and Asian Championships, Record Holder National, Asian Games, and Asian Championships	
Ashanthi De Alwis	Singer/Songwriter	
Varuni Amunugama Fernando	Founder TV Derana, Triad Advertising	
Otara Gunewardene	Founder ODEL	
Gladys Jayawardene	Physician	
Tamara Kunanayakam	Diplomat	
Madhubahashini Disanayaka Ratnayaka	Author	
Indira Samarasekera	President University of Alberta	
Asha de Vos	Marine biologist	
