= Disanayaka =

Disanayaka is a surname. Notable people with the surname include:

- Sithum Disanayaka (born 2000), Sri Lankan cricketer
- Madhubahashini Disanayaka Ratnayaka, Sri Lankan academic
