= 2023 Indian Premier League final =

Cricket match

- Match programme cover
- Event: 2023 Indian Premier League
Gujarat Titans	Chennai Super Kings
214/4	171/5
20 overs	15 overs
- Chennai Super Kings won by 5 wickets (DLS method)
- Date: 29 May 2023
- Venue: Narendra Modi Stadium, Ahmedabad
- Player of the match: Devon Conway (CSK)
- Umpires: Nitin Menon (Ind); Rod Tucker (Aus)
- Attendance: 101,566

The 2023 Indian Premier League final was played on 29 May 2023 at the Narendra Modi Stadium in Ahmedabad. It was a Day/Night Twenty20 match that would decide the winner of the 2023 season of the Indian Premier League (IPL), an annual Twenty20 tournament in India.

The match was originally scheduled to be played on 28 May, but was postponed to 29 May due to rain—marking the first time the IPL final had been postponed due to weather conditions. After winning the toss, Chennai Super Kings elected to field, with Gujarat Titans scoring 214 runs for 4 wickets, setting the record for the highest team total in an IPL final. Due to inclement weather, the Super Kings' innings was delayed by over an hour, and the target was adjusted by the Duckworth–Lewis–Stern (DLS) method to 171 runs in 15 overs; the team would ultimately win by five wickets, securing their fifth IPL title. CSK player Devon Conway was named player of the match.

The broadcasts of the match on JioCinema peaked at over 32 million concurrent viewers, overtaking the 2019 Cricket World Cup semi-final between India and New Zealand on Hotstar as India's most-watched livestreaming broadcast of all time.

== Background ==
On 17 February 2023, the BCCI announced the schedule for the 2023 season of the Indian Premier League. 12 venues were scheduled to host the group stage. The schedule for the playoffs was announced on 21 April. M. A. Chidambaram Stadium in Chennai was chosen to host qualifier 1 and the eliminator whereas the Narendra Modi Stadium was chosen to host qualifier 2 and the final. Chennai Super Kings and Gujarat Titans played the final on 29 May 2023. The Super Kings won the match by five wickets (DLS method).

== Road to the final ==
League progression
Team	Group matches														Playoffs		
Team	1	2	3	4	5	6	7	8	9	10	11	12	13	14	Q1/E	Q2	F
Gujarat Titans	2	4	4	6	6	8	10	12	12	14	16	16	18	20	L	W	L
Chennai Super Kings	0	2	4	4	6	8	10	10	10	11	13	15	15	17	W		W

Win	Loss	No result

- Note: The total points at the end of each group match are listed.
- Note: Click on the points (group matches) or W/L (playoffs) to see the match summary.

Gujarat Titans				Chennai Super Kings
League Stage
Opponent	Scorecard	Result	Titles	Opponent	Scorecard	Result
Chennai Super Kings	31 March 2023	Won	Match 1	Gujarat Titans	31 March 2023	Lost
Delhi Capitals	4 April 2023	Won	Match 2	Lucknow Super Giants	3 April 2023	Won
Kolkata Knight Riders	9 April 2023	Lost	Match 3	Mumbai Indians	8 April 2023	Won
Punjab Kings	13 April 2023	Won	Match 4	Rajasthan Royals	12 April 2023	Lost
Rajasthan Royals	16 April 2023	Lost	Match 5	Royal Challengers Bangalore	17 April 2023	Won
Lucknow Super Giants	22 April 2023	Won	Match 6	Sunrisers Hyderabad	21 April 2023	Won
Mumbai Indians	25 April 2023	Won	Match 7	Kolkata Knight Riders	23 April 2023	Won
Kolkata Knight Riders	29 April 2023	Won	Match 8	Rajasthan Royals	27 April 2023	Lost
Delhi Capitals	2 May 2023	Lost	Match 9	Punjab Kings	30 April 2023	Lost
Rajasthan Royals	5 May 2023	Won	Match 10	Lucknow Super Giants	3 May 2023	No result
Lucknow Super Giants	7 May 2023	Won	Match 11	Mumbai Indians	6 May 2023	Won
Mumbai Indians	12 May 2023	Lost	Match 12	Delhi Capitals	10 May 2023	Won
Sunrisers Hyderabad	15 May 2023	Won	Match 13	Kolkata Knight Riders	14 May 2023	Lost
Royal Challengers Bangalore	21 May 2023	Won	Match 14	Delhi Capitals	20 May 2023	Won
Playoff stage
Qualifier 1
Opponent	Scorecard	Result	Titles	Opponent	Scorecard	Result
Chennai Super Kings	23 May 2023	Lost	Match 15	Gujarat Titans	23 May 2023	Won
Opponent	Scorecard	Result	Titles
Mumbai Indians	26 May 2023	Won	Match 16
2023 Indian Premier League final

Source: Firstpost India Today

=== Group stage ===
Gujarat Titans started their season with a 5 wicket win over Chennai Super Kings at the Narendra Modi Stadium in Ahmedabad. After a victory over Delhi Capitals they were defeated by Kolkata Knight Riders. Then Titans defeated the Punjab Kings before they were defeated by the Rajasthan Royals. They went on a three match winning streak after that loss but lost three of their last five matches. They ended the group stage with 10 wins and 4 losses, finishing first on the points table for the second consecutive season.

Chennai Super Kings started their season with a loss of 5 wickets against Gujarat Titans at the Narendra Modi Stadium in Ahmedabad. After a winning streak of 2 matches they were defeated by Rajasthan Royals in their fourth fixture. Then after a three match winning streak they were again defeated by Rajasthan Royals. They won three of their last five matches. They ended the group stage with 8 wins and 5 losses excluding a washed out match against the Lucknow Super Giants thus, securing second position on the points table.

=== League stage matches between finalists ===
31 March 2023
19:30 (N)
Scorecard

Chennai Super Kings; 178/7 (20 overs)	v	Gujarat Titans (H); 182/5 (19.2 overs)

Gujarat Titans won by 5 wickets
Narendra Modi Stadium, Ahmedabad
Player of the match: Rashid Khan (Gujarat Titans)

Gujarat won the only fixture between the two teams by 5 wickets on 31 March in Ahmedabad. Rashid Khan took 2 wickets for 26 runs and was the player of the match.

=== Playoffs ===
The playoff stage of IPL was played according to the Page playoff system and provided Gujarat and Chennai, being the top and second-ranked teams, with two chances for qualifying for the Final. These teams first faced each other in Qualifier 1, with Chennai, as the winners, qualifying directly for the final; Gujarat, as the loser of Qualifier 1, played against the winner of the Eliminator in Qualifier 2, with the winner of that match qualifying for the final.

Qualifier 1
23 May 2023
19:30 (N)
Scorecard

Chennai Super Kings; 172/7 (20 overs)	v	Gujarat Titans; 157 (20 overs)

Chennai Super Kings won by 15 runs
Player of the match: Ruturaj Gaikwad (Chennai Super Kings)

In Qualifier 1, Gujarat won the toss and chose to field. Chennai Super Kings scored 172/7 in their 20 overs with Ruturaj Gaikwad top scored for Chennai with 60 runs in 44 balls. Mohammed Shami was Gujarat's best bowler and took 2 wickets for 28 runs. In reply, Gujarat was only able to score 157 in 19.5 overs and was all out. Shubman Gill scored 42 runs in 38 balls while Ravindra Jadeja, Deepak Chahar, Maheesh Theekshana and Matheesha Pathirana took 2 wickets each for Chennai. As a result, Chennai qualified for the 10th time in the IPL Final.

Mumbai Indians won against Lucknow Super Giants in the Eliminator to set up a match against Gujarat to decide the second finalist.

Qualifier 2
26 May 2023
19:30 (N)
Scorecard

Gujarat Titans; 233/3 (20 overs)	v	Mumbai Indians; 171 (18.2 overs)

Gujarat Titans won by 62 runs
Player of the match: Shubman Gill (Gujarat Titans)

In Qualifier 2, Mumbai won the toss and chose to field. Gujarat scored a record 233/3 runs in their 20 overs. Shubman Gill scored 129 runs in 60 balls. Though expensive, Piyush Chawla was best bowler for Mumbai as he took 1 wicket for 45 runs in 3 overs. In response, Mumbai was only able to score 171 runs in 18.2 overs and got all out. Suryakumar Yadav scored 61 runs from 38 balls while Mohit Sharma took 5 wickets for just 10 runs in 2.2 overs. Thus, Gujarat qualified for their second IPL final.

== Match ==
=== Match officials ===
- On-field umpires: Nitin Menon (Ind) and Rod Tucker (Aus)
- Third umpire: K. N. Ananthapadmanabhan (Ind)
- Reserve umpire: Jayaraman Madanagopal (Ind)
- Match referee: Javagal Srinath (Ind)
- Toss: Chennai Super Kings won the toss and elected to field.

=== Summary ===
In a rain delayed match, Chennai Super Kings won the toss and elected to field. The game was rained out on day 1 and moved over to the reserve day. Batting first, Gujarat Titans scored 214 runs for the loss of 4 wickets in their 20 overs. Left-handed batsman Sai Sudharsan top scored with 96 runs while Indian wicketkeeper Wriddhiman Saha scored 54 runs. Sri Lankan fast bowler Matheesha Pathirana took 2 wickets while conceding 44 runs for the Super Kings. In response, Chennai Super Kings chased the revised target of 171 runs from 15 overs. Devon Conway scored 47 runs from 25 balls while Mohit Sharma took 3 wickets from 36 runs in 3 overs. Thus, Super Kings won their 5th title and Conway was named as the player of the match

=== Gujarat Titans innings ===
Having been asked to bat, the Titans got off to a healthy start with openers Wriddhiman Saha and Shubman Gill helping the team get to 50 runs in 5.2 overs and went on to score 62 runs for the loss of no wickets at the end of the first power play at 6 overs. Gill was the first to fall, dismissed off a stumping by MS Dhoni off the bowling of Ravindra Jadeja. He scored 39 runs off 20 balls. Indian batsman Sai Sudharsan joined Saha, and the duo put on 64 runs before Saha was out caught by Dhoni off the bowling of Deepak Chahar. The score was 131 runs for the loss of 2 wickets at the end of 14 overs. Sudharsan was joined by captain Hardik Pandya, and the duo put on a quickfire 81 runs off 5 overs before Sudharsan was out leg before wicket off the bowling of Pathirana for 96 runs, his highest score, in the twentieth over. The Titans wrapped their innings scoring 214 runs having lost 4 wickets in their 20 overs. Sri Lankan fast bowler Matheesha Pathirana took 2 wickets while conceding 11 runs for the Super Kings.

=== Chennai Super Kings innings ===
The Super Kings innings was delayed by rain with the game being reduced to 15 overs and a revised target of 171 runs to win the finals and the championship. Indian batter Ruturaj Gaikwad and New Zealand batter Devon Conway opened the innings for Super Kings and got the team to a healthy start scoring 52 runs off 4 overs from the first power play. Gaikwad was the first to be dismissed when he was out for 26 runs caught at backward point by Afghan allrounder Rashid Khan off the bowling of fellow Afghan spinner Noor Ahmad. Conway was out the very same over dismissed caught by Mohit Sharma off Ahmad. Impact substitute Shivam Dube was joined by Indian batter Ajinkya Rahane and the duo took the score to 117 runs off 10.5 overs before Rahane was out caught by Vijay Shankar off the bowling of Sharma. Captain MS Dhoni came-in to bat when the team was down four wickets with Ambati Rayudu (Note: This was the last IPL game of Rayudu, earlier in the day he announced his retirement from IPL and Indian cricket.) dismissed caught and bowled off Sharma. Dhoni was out for a duck the very first ball caught by David Miller at extra cover off the bowling of Sharma.

The game came down to the last two deliveries with the Super Kings needing 10 runs to win. Indian batter Ravindra Jadeja was on strike facing Mohit Sharma. Jadeja hoisted the penultimate delivery for a six over long off before finishing the innings by scoring a boundary behind the leg stump. The Super Kings won the game and the championship off the last ball of the rain reduced innings of 15 overs. This was the Super Kings' fifth IPL title.

29 May 2023
19:30 (N)
Scorecard

Gujarat Titans; 214/4 (20 overs)	v	Chennai Super Kings; 171/5 (15 overs)
Sai Sudharsan 96 (47); Matheesha Pathirana 2/44 (4 overs)		Devon Conway 47 (25); Mohit Sharma 3/36 (3 overs)

Chennai Super Kings won by 5 wickets (DLS method)
Narendra Modi Stadium, Ahmedabad
Umpires: Nitin Menon (Ind) and Rod Tucker (Aus)
Player of the match: Devon Conway (Chennai Super Kings)

- Chennai Super Kings won the toss and elected to field.
- The match was originally scheduled to be held on 28 May 2023, but it was shifted due to rain.
- Chennai Super Kings were set a revised target of 171 runs from 15 overs due to rain.
- By winning in the final, Chennai Super Kings equaled Mumbai Indians for winning the most IPL trophies (5).

=== Scorecard ===
Key
- (IMP) indicates an impact player

Gujarat Titans innings
Player	Status	Runs	Balls	4s	6s	Strike rate
Wriddhiman Saha	c †Dhoni b Chahar	54	39	5	1	138.46
Shubman Gill	st †Dhoni b Jadeja	39	20	7	0	195.00
Sai Sudharsan	lbw Pathirana	96	47	8	6	204.25
Hardik Pandya	not out	21	12	0	2	175.00
Rashid Khan	c Gaikwad b Pathirana	0	2	0	0	0.00
Vijay Shankar	did not bat					
David Miller	did not bat					
Rahul Tewatia	did not bat					
Mohit Sharma	did not bat					
Noor Ahmad	did not bat					
Mohammed Shami	did not bat					
Extras 4 (b 1, lb 1, wd 2); Total 214/4 (20 overs)				20	9	10.70 RR

Fall of wickets: 67/1 (S. Gill, 6.6 ov), 131/2 (W. Saha, 13.6 ov), 212/3 (S. Sudharsan, 19.3 ov), 214/4 (R. Khan, 19.6 ov)

Chennai Super Kings bowling
Bowler	Overs	Maidens	Runs	Wickets	Econ	Wides	NBs
Deepak Chahar	4	0	38	1	9.50	0	0
Tushar Deshpande	4	0	56	0	14.00	0	0
Maheesh Theekshana	4	0	36	0	9.00	0	0
Ravindra Jadeja	4	0	38	1	9.50	0	0
Matheesha Pathirana	4	0	44	2	11.00	2	0

Impact players
Team	Out	In
Chennai Super Kings	Matheesha Pathirana	Shivam Dube
Gujarat Titans	Sai Sudharsan	Josh Little

Chennai Super Kings innings
Player	Status	Runs	Balls	4s	6s	Strike rate
Ruturaj Gaikwad	c Khan b Ahmad	26	16	3	1	162.50
Devon Conway	c Sharma b Ahmad	47	25	4	2	188.00
Shivam Dube (IMP)	not out	32	21	0	2	152.38
Ajinkya Rahane	c Shankar b Sharma	27	13	2	2	207.69
Ambati Rayudu	c & b Sharma	19	8	1	2	237.50
MS Dhoni	c Miller b Sharma	0	1	0	0	0.00
Ravindra Jadeja	not out	15	6	1	1	250.00
Moeen Ali	did not bat					
Deepak Chahar	did not bat					
Tushar Deshpande	did not bat					
Maheesh Theekshana	did not bat					
Extras 5 (lb 1, wd 4); Total 171/5 (15 overs)				11	10	11.40 RR

Fall of wickets: 74/1 (R. Gaikwad, 6.3 ov), 78/2 (D. Conway, 6.6 ov), 117/3 (A. Rahane, 10.5 ov), 149/4 (A. Rayudu, 12.4 ov), 149/5 (M. Dhoni, 12.5 ov)

Gujarat Titans bowling
Bowler	Overs	Maidens	Runs	Wickets	Econ	Wides	NBs
Mohammed Shami	3	0	29	0	9.66	0	0
Hardik Pandya	1	0	14	0	14.00	1	0
Rashid Khan	3	0	44	0	14.66	0	0
Noor Ahmad	3	0	17	2	5.66	3	0
Josh Little (IMP)	2	0	30	0	15.00	0	0
Mohit Sharma	3	0	36	3	12.00	0	0
