= 2022 Colombo Stars season =

Colombo based franchise cricket team in Sri Lanka

Colombo Stars
2022 season
- Coach: Ruwan Kalpage
- Captain: Angelo Mathews
- Tournament performance: Runners up (2nd)
- Most runs: Dinesh Chandimal (287)
- Most wickets: Kasun Rajitha (13)

The Colombo Stars (abbreviated as CS) is a franchise cricket team which competes in 2022 Lanka Premier League. The team is based in Colombo, Western Province, Sri Lanka. In November 2021, the team changed their name to Colombo Stars after changing owners. The team was captained by Angelo Mathews and coached by Ruwan Kalpage.

== Squad ==
- Players with international caps are listed in **bold**
- Ages given as of 6 December 2022, the date the first match was played in the tournament

No.	Name	Nationality	Birth date	Batting style	Bowling style	Notes
Batsman
72	**Charith Asalanka**	Sri Lanka	29 June 1997 (aged 25)	Left-handed	Right-arm off break	
	Chathuranga Kumara	Sri Lanka	19 January 1992 (aged 30)	Right-handed	Right-arm fast-medium	
	Navod Paranavithana	Sri Lanka	16 May 2002 (aged 20)	Left - handed	Left arm Slow medium	
All-rounders
69	**Angelo Mathews**	Sri Lanka	2 June 1987 (aged 35)	Right-handed	Right-arm medium	Captain
29	**Ravi Bopara**	England	4 May 1985 (aged 37)	Right-handed	Right-arm medium	Overseas player
29	Benny Howell	England	5 October 1988 (aged 34)	Right-handed	Right-arm medium	Overseas player
11	**Karim Janat**	Afghanistan	11 August 1998 (aged 24)	Right-handed	Right-arm medium-fast	Overseas player
41	**Seekkuge Prasanna**	Sri Lanka	27 June 1985 (aged 37)	Right-handed	Right-arm leg break	
17	**Dhananjaya Lakshan**	Sri Lanka	5 October 1998 (aged 24)	Left - handed	Right-arm medium-fast	
16	Ishan Jayaratne	Sri Lanka	26 June 1989 (aged 33)	Right-handed	Right-arm fast-medium	
20	Muditha Lakshan	Sri Lanka	20 December 2000 (aged 21)	Right-handed	Slow left arm orthodox	
	Lakshitha Manasinghe	Sri Lanka	21 November 1999 (aged 23)	Left - handed	Right-arm off break	
	Kevin Koththigoda	Sri Lanka	8 October 1998 (aged 24)	Left - handed	Right-arm leg break	
	Chamod Battage	Sri Lanka	25 September 2000 (aged 22)	Right-handed	Right-arm fast-medium	
Wicket-keepers
48	**Niroshan Dickwella**	Sri Lanka	23 June 1993 (aged 29)	Left - handed	—	
56	**Dinesh Chandimal**	Sri Lanka	18 November 1989 (aged 33)	Right-handed	Right-arm off break	
Spin bowlers
46	**Jeffrey Vandersay**	Sri Lanka	5 February 1990 (aged 32)	Right-handed	Right-arm leg break	
Pace bowlers
	**Suranga Lakmal**	Sri Lanka	10 March 1987 (aged 35)	Right-handed	Right-arm medium fast	
	**Kasun Rajitha**	Sri Lanka	1 June 1993 (aged 29)	Right-handed	Right-arm medium fast	
78	**Naveen-ul-Haq**	Afghanistan	23 September 1999 (aged 23)	Right-handed	Right-arm medium-fast	Overseas player
	**Dominic Drakes**	West Indies	6 February 1998 (aged 24)	Left-handed	Left-arm medium fast	Overseas player
	**Romario Shepherd**	West Indies	26 November 1994 (aged 28)	Right-handed	Right-arm fast medium	Overseas player

- Source: espncricinfo

== Seasonal standings ==
Pos	Team	Pld	W	L	NR	Pts	NRR
1	Kandy Falcons (3rd)	8	7	1	0	14	1.884
2	Jaffna Kings (C)	8	6	2	0	12	1.010
3	Colombo Stars (R)	8	3	5	0	6	−0.847
4	Galle Gladiators (4th)	8	2	6	0	4	−0.936
5	Dambulla Aura	8	2	6	0	4	−1.198

Source: ESPN Cricinfo
- The top four teams qualify for the playoffs
- Advance to Qualifier 1
- Advance to Eliminator

== League stage ==
Match 2
6 December 2022
19:30 (N)
Scorecard

Kandy Falcons; 199/1 (20 overs)	v	Colombo Stars; 90 (14.3 overs)
Andre Fletcher 102* (67); Seekkuge Prasanna 1/23 (3 overs)		Angelo Mathews 26 (23); Wanindu Hasaranga 4/14 (3 overs)

Kandy Falcons won by 109 runs.
Mahinda Rajapaksa International Cricket Stadium, Hambantota
Umpires: Chandrika Amarasinghe (SL) and Raveendra Wimalasiri (SL)
Player of the match: Andre Fletcher (Kandy Falcons)

- Colombo Stars won the toss and elected to field.

Match 5
8 December 2022
15:00 (D/N)
Scorecard

Colombo Stars; 165/9 (20 overs)	v	Dambulla Aura; 156/7 (20 overs)
Niroshan Dickwella 62 (41); Lahiru Kumara 4/36 (4 overs)		Tom Abell 33 (22); Suranga Lakmal 2/29 (4 overs)

Colombo Stars won by 9 runs
Mahinda Rajapaksa International Cricket Stadium, Hambantota
Umpires: Chandrika Amarasinghe (SL) and Lyndon Hannibal (SL)
Player of the match: Niroshan Dickwella (Colombo Stars)

- Colombo Stars won the toss and elected to bat.

Match 7
11 December 2022
15:00 (N)
Scorecard

Galle Gladiators; 174/6 (20 overs)	v	Colombo Stars; 149/7 (20 overs)
Lahiru Udara 45* (30); Jeffrey Vandersay 2/31 (4 overs)		Niroshan Dickwella 58* (44); Iftikhar Ahmed 2/12 (2 overs)

Galle Gladiators won by 25 runs
Pallekele International Cricket Stadium, Kandy
Umpires: Ruchira Palliyaguruge (SL) and Chamara de Soysa (SL)
Player of the match: Lahiru Udara (Galle Gladiators)

- Galle Gladiators won the toss and elected to bat.

Match 10
12 December 2022
19:30 (N)
Scorecard

Jaffna Kings; 178/5 (20 overs)	v	Colombo Stars; 172/8 (20 overs)
Shoaib Malik 35* (26); Benny Howell 2/37 (4 overs)		Angelo Mathews 73* (39); James Fuller 2/32 (4 overs); Vijayakanth Viyaskanth 2/32 (4 overs)

Jaffna Kings won by 6 runs
Pallekele International Cricket Stadium, Kandy
Umpires: Gregory Brathwaite (WI) and Ranmore Martinesz (SL)
Player of the match: James Fuller (Jaffna Kings)

- Colombo Stars won the toss and elected to field.

Match 12
13 December 2022
19:30 (N)
Scorecard

Galle Gladiators; 193/5 (20 overs)	v	Colombo Stars; 197/8 (20 overs)
Kusal Mendis 72 (49); Naveen-ul-Haq 2/33 (4 overs)		Dinesh Chandimal 63 (33); Nuwan Thushara 3/29 (4 overs)

Colombo Stars won by 2 wickets
Pallekele International Cricket Stadium, Kandy
Umpires: Ruchira Palliyaguruge (SL) and Prageeth Rambukwella (SL)
Player of the match: Ravi Bopara (Colombo Stars)

- Colombo Stars won the toss and elected to field.

Match 14
14 December 2022
19:30 (N)
Scorecard

Dambulla Aura; 89 (13.5 overs)	v	Colombo Stars; 90/1 (11.3 overs)
Pramod Madushan 23* (26); Kasun Rajitha 5/22 (4 overs)		Charith Asalanka 58* (36); Pramod Madushan 1/3 (2 overs)

Colombo Stars won by 9 wickets
Pallekele International Cricket Stadium, Kandy
Umpires: Lyndon Hannibal (SL) and Ranmore Martinesz (SL)
Player of the match: Kasun Rajitha (Colombo Stars)

- Colombo Stars won the toss and elected to field.

Match 16
17 December 2022
19:30 (D/N)
Scorecard

Colombo Stars; 106 (19.1 overs)	v	Kandy Falcons; 108/1 (16 overs)
Angelo Mathews 41 (38); Chamika Karunaratne 4/11 (3.1 overs)		Kamindu Mendis 51* (48); Suranga Lakmal 1/19 (2 overs)

Kandy Falcons won by 9 wickets
R. Premadasa Stadium, Colombo
Umpires: Wayne Knights (NZ) and Raveendra Wimalasiri (SL)
Player of the match: Chamika Karunaratne (Kandy Falcons)

- Colombo Stars won the toss and elected to bat.

Match 19
19 December 2022
15:00 (N)
Scorecard

Colombo Stars; 128/9 (20 overs)	v	Jaffna Kings; 131/2 (15.5 overs)
Dominic Drakes 38 (20); Shoaib Malik 2/4 (2 overs)		Rahmanullah Gurbaz 69 (40); Dominic Drakes 1/30 (2.5 overs)

Jaffna Kings won by 8 wickets
R. Premadasa Stadium, Colombo
Umpires: Lyndon Hannibal (SL) and Wayne Knights (NZ)
Player of the match: Rahmanullah Gurbaz (Jaffna Kings)

- Jaffna Kings won the toss and elected to field.

== Playoffs ==
=== Eliminator ===
Match 22
21 December 2022
19:30 (N)
Scorecard

Galle Gladiators; 108/9 (18 overs)	v	Colombo Stars; 109/3 (16.5 overs)
Sahan Arachchige 53 (31); Benny Howell 3/17 (2 overs)		Ravi Bopara 43* (28); Imad Wasim 1/18 (4 overs)

Colombo Stars won by 7 wickets
R. Premadasa Stadium, Colombo
Umpires: Lyndon Hannibal (SL) and Prageeth Rambukwella (SL)
Player of the match: Ravi Bopara (Colombo Stars)

- Colombo Stars won the toss and elected to field.
- The match was reduced to 18 overs per side due to rain.

=== Qualifier 2 ===
Match 23
22 December 2022
19:30 (N)
Scorecard

Kandy Falcons; 168/6 (20 overs)	v	Colombo Stars; 169/4 (18.5 overs)
Wanindu Hasaranga 77* (34); Kasun Rajitha 4/20 (4 overs)		Charith Asalanka 64 (40); Kamindu Mendis 2/26 (4 overs)

Colombo Stars won by 6 wickets
R. Premadasa Stadium, Colombo
Umpires: Wayne Knights (NZ) and Raveendra Wimalasiri (SL)
Player of the match: Kasun Rajitha (Colombo Stars)

- Colombo Stars won the toss and elected to field.

=== Final ===
Match 24
23 December 2022
19:30 (N)
Scorecard

Colombo Stars; 163/5 (20 overs)	v	Jaffna Kings; 164/8 (19.2 overs)
Dinesh Chandimal 49 (40); Thisara Perera 1/16 (2 overs)		Avishka Fernando 50 (43); Suranga Lakmal 3/23 (3 overs)

Jaffna Kings won by 2 wickets
R. Premadasa Stadium, Colombo
Umpires: Kumar Dharmasena (SL) and Wayne Knights (NZ)
Player of the match: Avishka Fernando (Jaffna Kings)

- Jaffna Kings won the toss and elected to field.
