= Kapuwatta =

Kapuwatta is one of the largest suburbs of Ja-Ela, outside of Colombo, Sri Lanka. It hosts many institutes including, but not limited to the Sri Lanka Thriposha Limited, and etc. The now closed shopping mall K Zone Ja-Ela, considered Gampaha District's largest shopping mall, was also located in Kapuwatte.
