= NH Collection Colombo =

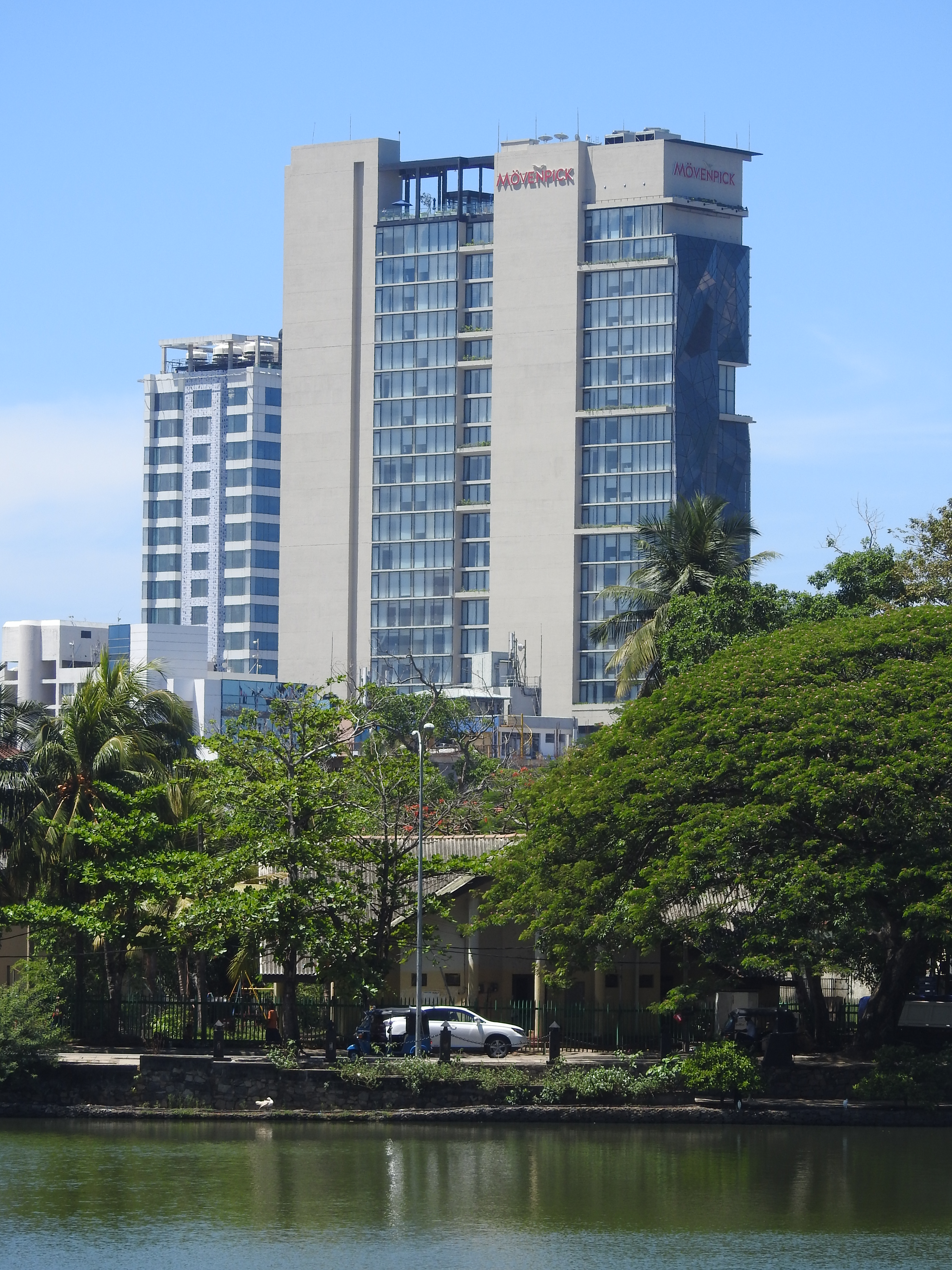
- The hotel as seen across the Beira Lake
- Former names: Mövenpick Hotel Colombo
- Hotel chain: NH Collection

General information
- Town or city: Colombo
- Country: Sri Lanka
- Coordinates: 6°54′42.6″N 79°51′03.0″E
- Opened: 2017
- Owner: Softlogic Holdings

Technical details
- Floor count: 24

Other information
- Number of rooms: 219
- Number of restaurants: 3

Website
- Official webpage

NH Collection Colombo, formerly known as Mövenpick Hotel Colombo, is a five-star luxury hotel in Colombo, Sri Lanka. The hotel is part of the hotel chain brand NH Collection from 2024 and is owned by the Sri Lankan conglomerate, Softlogic Holdings. The hotel was previously managed by Mövenpick Hotels & Resorts. It is the first hotel to be launched in Colombo in 25 years. The hotel is 24 storeys high and includes 219 rooms.

== History ==
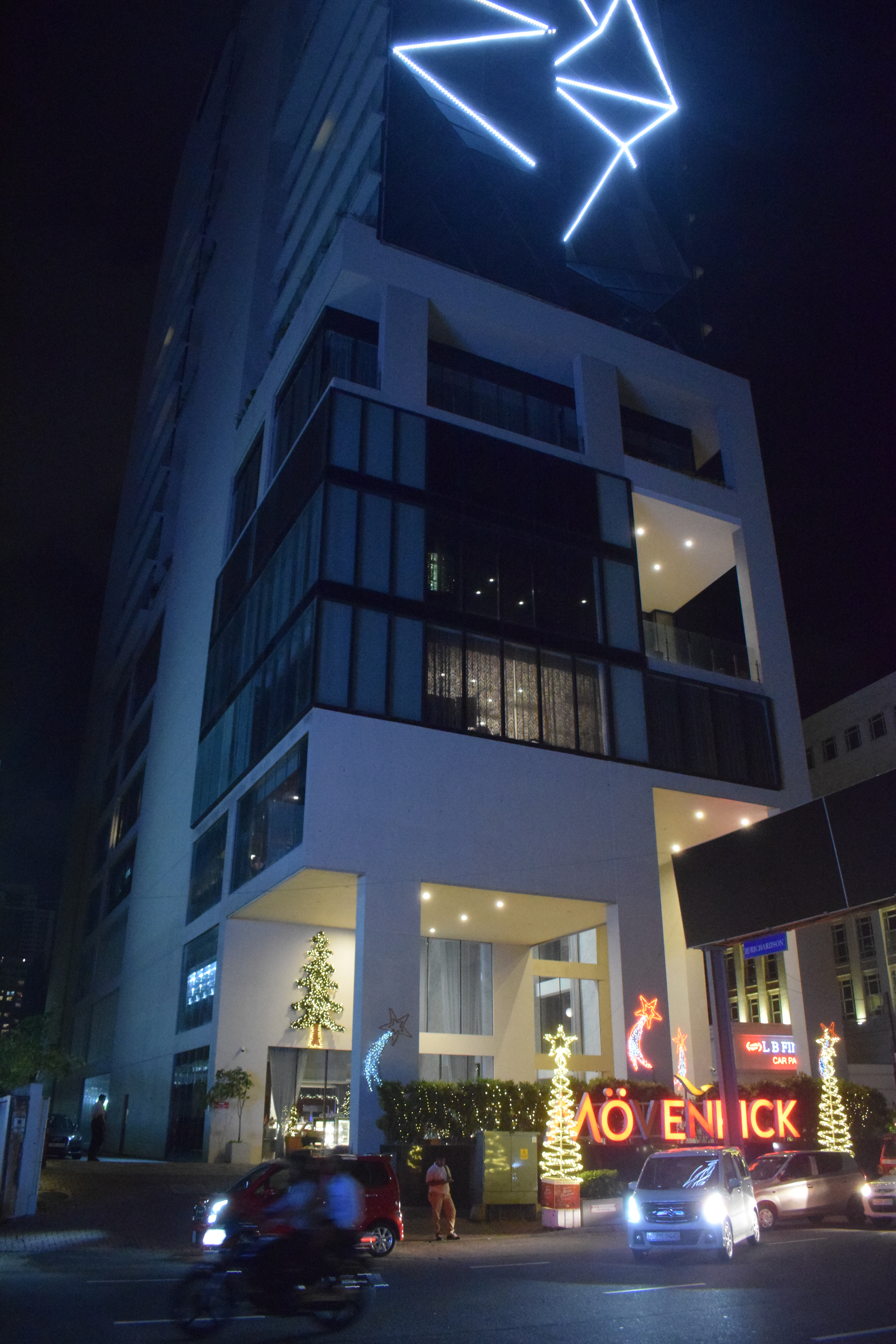
The entrance of the hotel

The hotel was declared open on 9 January 2017 by President Maithripala Sirisena. It is the first five-star hotel in Colombo in 25 years. The hotel has won the "Sri Lanka's Leading Hotel" award and the "Sri Lanka's Leading Hotel Suite" award at the World Travel Awards in 2017, 2018, and 2019. Roshan Perera, the new general manager, was appointed to the hotel in December 2020.

=== COVID-19 pandemic ===
A member of the hotel staff tested positive for COVID-19 on 26 December 2020 during a routine check. Mövenpick Hotel Colombo received the "Safe and Secure Level 1 Hotel" certification in March 2021. KPMG audited the hotel as part of the certification. After the temporary closure due to the COVID-19 pandemic, the hotel reopened in October 2021.

=== Post-pandemic ===
Softlogic Holdings announced that from 1 June 2024, the hotel would be operated by NH Collection. The hotel was rebranded as NH Collection Colombo.

== Amenities ==
The hotel has three restaurants, AYU, an International cuisine buffet restaurant; Robata Grill, an Asian cuisine restaurant; Vistas Bar, the rooftop bar on the 24th floor. Ayu restaurant is located on the fourth floor and has a walk-in wine and cheese cellar. The hotel's other amenities include an infinity pool, a whirlpool tub with a cityview, a branch of Spa Ceylon and a gym on the 23rd floor. The Mansion is the members-only executive lounge in the lobby of the hotel. Whiskey and Cigar Lounge is another members-only lounge in the hotel.

== See also ==
- List of hotels in Sri Lanka
