= Rajiv Kumar (cricketer) =

Indian former first-class cricketer (born 1976)

Personal information
- Born: 2 December 1976 (age 49); Patna, Bihar, India
- Batting: Right-handed
- Bowling: Right-arm medium
- Role: Batsman

Domestic team information
- Years: Team
- 1994/95–2003/04: Bihar
- 2004/05–2010/11: Jharkhand
- 2007/08–2008/09: Royal Bengal Tigers

Head coaching information
- Years: Team
- 2024–present: Pokhara Avengers

Career statistics
Competition	FC	LA	T20
Matches	84	63	9
Runs scored	5,078	1,956	175
Batting average	39.67	40.75	35.00
100s/50s	10/27	1/15	1/15
Top score	164	106*	45*
Balls bowled	114	108	–
Wickets	1	2	–
Bowling average	65.00	62.00	–
5 wickets in innings	0	0	–
10 wickets in match	0	0	–
Best bowling	1/12	2/35	–
Catches/stumpings	66/–	30/–	5/–
- Source: ESPNcricinfo, 15 February 2016

Rajiv Kumar (born 2 December 1976) is an Indian former first-class cricketer who played for Bihar and Jharkhand. He currently works as the head coach of Jharkhand and fielding coach for Chennai Super Kings

Rajiv also captained former Indian captain Mahendra Singh Dhoni in first class career

== Career ==
A right-handed batsman, Kumar appeared for Bihar between 1994/95 and 2003/04 seasons, as well as Jharkhand between 2004/05 and 2010/11. He also played in 1998 for India 'A against Australia, He was also part of the India A team touring Holland in 1999. He was the third highest run-getter of the 1997–98 Ranji Trophy with 805 runs at an average of 57.50 including three centuries. After Jharkhand replaced Bihar in domestic cricket in 2004/05, Kumar continued his career with the new team. He played for East Zone and Wills' XI as well and captained Jharkhand in a few matches. In late 2007, he joined the rebel Indian Cricket League (ICL) and played for Royal Bengal Tigers (Kolkata Tigers) until the next season. He returned to domestic cricket accepting BCCI's amnesty offer for ICL players. He played his last competitive match in December 2010.

Kumar became the Jharkhand under-19 coach in 2014. Ahead of the 2015/16 season, the Jharkhand State Cricket Association named Kumar as the head coach of Jharkhand senior team, replacing V. Venkatram at the position.

== Coaching career ==
He was appointed as Fielding coach for Chennai Super Kings.
