= Asiri Hospital Holdings =

Healthcare company in Sri Lanka

Asiri Hospital Holdings PLC
- Logo of Asiri Hospital Holdings
- Company type: Public
- Traded as: CSE: ASIR.N0000
- ISIN: LK0010N00005
- Industry: Healthcare
- Founded: September 29, 1980; 45 years ago
- Headquarters: Colombo, Sri Lanka
- Key people: Ashok Pathirage (Chairman/managing director); Manjula Karunaratne (Chief Executive Officer)
- Revenue: ▲LKR22,324 million (2022)
- Operating income: ▲LKR4,772 million (2022)
- Net income: ▲LKR3,803 million (2022)
- Total assets: ▲LKR39,243 million (2022)
- Total equity: ▲LKR15,823 million (2022)
- Parent: Softlogic Holdings
- Subsidiaries: See text
- Website: www.asirihealth.com

Asiri Hospital Holdings PLC (formerly Asiri Hospitals PLC), doing business as Asiri Health, is the largest private healthcare provider in Sri Lanka. The company commenced operations in 1986 and was listed on the Colombo Stock Exchange in the same year. Asiri Hospitals operate six hospitals and collectively has over an 800-bed capacity. Softlogic Holdings is the parent company of Asiri Hospitals group. Asiri Hospital Holdings ranked 57th in the LMD 100, an annual list of listed companies by revenue, in the 2020/21 edition.

== History ==
The company was incorporated in 1980. The company commenced operations in 1986 and was listed on the Colombo Stock Exchange in the same year. Asiri Group acquired Asha Central Hospital in 2007 and renamed the hospital Asiri Central Hospital. Asha Central Hospital's services in Cinnamon Gardens were transferred to Central Hospital in Norris Canal Road, Maradana. Asiri Surgical Hospital PLC divested its stake of 32% in Asiri Central Hospitals PLC to Asiri Hospital Holdings for LKR1.82 billion in 2012 as a part of internal restructuring. Subsequently, Asiri Central Hospitals PLC was delisted from the Colombo Stock Exchange and changed its legal name to Asiri Centrals Hospital Limited. The hospital group's 30-years anniversary of operations was celebrated in 2014.

TPG Growth acquired Actis's 28% stake in Asiri Hospitals in 2015. Asiri Hospitals shared 30% of private sector capacity in 2015. Asiri Group was rebranded as Asiri Health in 2016 in all the group hospitals. Asiri Hospitals Holdings acquired Hemas Galle Hospital from Hemas Holdings for LKR450 million in 2018. Hemas Galle Hospital was commissioned in 2009 with 50 beds. Asiri Hospital Kandy Ltd., a wholly owned subsidiary of Asiri Hospitals, amalgamated with the company in 2018 and ceased to exist. Four hospitals of the group (Airi Surgical, Asiri Medical and Asiri Galle, Asiri Matara) received accreditation from the Australian Council on Healthcare Standards International in 2020.

== Operations ==
Asiri Hospitals is the largest listed hospital group in terms of both market capitalisation and bed count. Asiri Laboratories control 60% of the market share in the diagnostics market. Inland Revenue Department imposed an LKR1.5 billion tax bill on Asiri Surgical Hospital, a subsidiary of Asiri Hospitals in 2016. Inland Revenue Department alleged that Asiri Surgical failed its agreement with the Board of Investment of Sri Lanka by not maintaining one ward with at least 10 beds and an outpatient unit for non-paying patients. The company operate six hospitals, viz. Asiri Central, Asiri Surgical, Asiri Medical in Colombo, Asiri Kandy, Asiri Galle, and Asiri Matara. In total, these six hospitals have over an 800-bed capacity. Asiri Hospitals divested a 50% stake in Asiri AOI Cancer Centre Pvt Ltd to Cancer Treatment Services International in 2017 for LKR212.5 million. Nawaloka Hospitals and Durdans Hospital joined Doc990, a doctor appointment booking platform developed by a joint venture of Dialog Axiata and Asiri Hospital Holdings. In 2022, Brand Finance estimated the brand value to be LKR2,450 million and ranked Asiri Health as the 42nd most valuable in the country.

== Subsidiaries ==
Subsidiary	Stake
Asiri Central Hospitals Ltd	99.06%
Asiri Hospital Matara (Pvt) Ltd.	100%
Asiri Diagnostics Services (Pvt) Ltd.	66.54%
Asiri Surgical Hospital PLC	79.96%
Central Hospital Ltd	99.73%
Asiri Laboratories (Pvt) Ltd.	100%
Asiri Hospital Galle (Pvt) Ltd.	100%
Asiri AOI Cancer Centre (Pvt) Ltd	39.98%
Asiri Myanmar Limited	100%
Asiri Diagnostic Services (Asia) Pte. Ltd	100%

Source: Annual Report, 2021/22

== See also ==
- List of companies listed on the Colombo Stock Exchange
