= Odel =

Sri Lankan department store chain

Odel plc
- Odel logo
- Type: Public
- Traded as: CSE: ODEL.N0000
- ISIN: LK0366N00001
- Industry: Retailing
- Founded: 1990; 36 years ago
- Founder: Otara Gunewardene
- Headquarters: Rajagiriya, Sri Lanka
- Key people: Ashok Pathirage (Chairman/Managing Director)
- Products: Clothing, Sportswear, Cosmetics, Footwear, Jewellery, Luggage, Food, Stationery and Souvenirs
- Revenue: ▲LKR8.253 billion (2023)
- Operating income: ▲LKR718 million (2023)
- Net income: ▲LKR(2.211) billion (2023)
- Total assets: ▲LKR30.880 billion (2023)
- Total equity: ▼LKR2.909 billion (2023)
- Number of employees: over 900 (2023)
- Parent: Softlogic Retail Holdings
- Subsidiaries: Cotton Collections
- Website: odel.lk/home

Odel (stylised as O▷ΞL and ODEL) is a public retail company, the first in Sri Lanka. Starting out as a single company focusing on the retail garment trade, Odel developed over the years to become the first department store in the country.

== History ==
The company started when Otara Gunewardene began selling factory surplus garments and apparel from her car boot to family and friends in 1989.

Gunewardene registered Odel (the name is based on her own name, Otara Del Gunawardene) as a private limited liability company on 31 October 1990 and the company opened its first 37 m^{2} (400 sq ft) store on Dickmans Road in Colombo. In 1994 they opened their second store in Majestic City and by 1995 the company had a total of nine stores located in city hotels and shopping centres throughout Colombo.

In 1996 Odel opened its 930 m^{2} (10,000 sq ft) flagship store in Alexandra Place, Colombo, which was further expanded to 3,700 m^{2} (40,000 sq ft) in 2000. In 2005 the company opened a store in the departure/transit lounge of Bandaranaike International Airport, Katunayake, as a part of an initiative in conjunction with the Airport Expansion Project. Odel opened two more stores in Kohuwela and Ja-Ela.

In 2009 they opened a further three stores in Nugegoda, Mount Lavinia and Moratuwa. The following year the company opened another three stores in Panadura, Maharagama and Battaramulla. On 24 February 2010, it was converted into a public limited liability company and in July Odel became the first fashion retail business to be listed on the Colombo Stock Exchange.

In 2012 the company opened stores in Wattala, Kiribathgoda and in the Kandy City Centre shopping complex, the first store outside the Western Province. Odel also launched Luv SL - a concept store carrying stylish souvenirs and products catering to locals and tourists - opening Luv SL stores at the Queen's Hotel, Kandy and the Old Colombo Dutch Hospital shopping precinct.

In July 2012 Parkson Retail Asia Limited purchased a 41.82 per cent stake in the company for Rs 1.424 billion.

In September 2014 Gunewardene sold her majority shareholdings in Odel PLC to the Softlogic Group for LKR 2.7 billion. Softlogic has subsequently increased its shareholding and on 30 June 30, 2016, it held a 96.67 per cent stake in the company.
