= Softlogic Holdings =

Sri Lankan conglomerate

Softlogic Holdings PLC
- Logo of Softlogic Holdings
- Company type: Public
- Traded as: CSE: SHL.N0000
- ISIN: LK0386N00009
- Industry: Conglomerate
- Founded: 1998; 27 years ago
- Founder: Ashok Pathirage
- Headquarters: Colombo, Sri Lanka
- Key people: Ashok Pathirage (Chairman)
- Products: Retail; Healthcare; Financial services; ICT; Automobiles; Leisure
- Revenue: ▼LKR96.899 billion (2023)
- Operating income: ▼LKR1.851 billion (2023)
- Net income: ▼LKR(23.657) billion (2023)
- Total assets: ▼LKR184.237 billion (2023)
- Total equity: ▼LKR(17.872) billion (2023)
- Owners: Asoka Pathirage (41.35%); Samena Ceylon Holdings Limited (20.75%); Haresh Kumar Kaimal (6.75%)
- Number of employees: 11,092 (2023)
- Website: www.softlogic.lk

Softlogic Holdings PLC is a diversified conglomerate in Sri Lanka engaged in ICT, healthcare, retail, financial services, automobiles and leisure.

== History ==
Softlogic began as a software development company in 1991 by Ashok Pathirage and twelve employees. The company later successfully obtained the Dell authorised distributorship in Sri Lanka. Softlogic ventured into the telecommunications sector with a partnership with Dialog Axiata offering corporate and individual Dialog GSM packages. Pathirage who realised the potential of mobile communications acquired the national dealership of Nokia in the year 2000. Softlogic went through a period of aggressive growth between 2006 and 2009 where they entered the retail sector with the acquisition of Uni Walkers (Pvt) Ltd. Softlogic which had begun to diversify entering retail and lifestyle sectors opened furniture stores and showrooms islandwide. Softlogic became the authorised dealer for Panasonic, Samsung, Nokia, Dell, Apple, Candy, Russell Hobbs, Kelvinator adding the brand names within its fold of Consumer Electronics. The branded apparel sector was also growing with the authorised distributor status for the jeanswear brand ‘Levis’ in 2009.

Later Softlogic acquired and renovated Ceysands Hotels and Resorts jointly with Centara chain of Hotels. They also acquired Asiri group of hospitals as well as a large stake in the retail chain ODEL and built a 5-star 24-storey hotel with Movenpick in Colombo.

== Sectors ==
=== Healthcare ===
Softlogic Holdings is represented in the healthcare sector by Asiri Health chain of hospitals.

=== Retail ===
- Consumer Electronics
- Branded Apparels - Galleria, ODEL
- Furniture
- Restaurants - Burger King, Baskin Robbins, Crystal Jade, Popeyes, Subway, Delifrance
- Softlogic Glomark Supermarkets
- Agora Super Stores - Bangladesh

=== Financial ===
- Softlogic Finance PLC
- Softlogic Life Insurance PLC
- Softlogic Stockbrokers (Pvt) Ltd

=== ICT ===
- Softlogic Information Technologies
- Softlogic Computers
- Softlogic Communications
- Softlogic International
- Office Automation
- Softlogic Australia
- Softlogic Mobile Distribution
- Softlogic BPO Services

=== Automobile ===
- Softlogic Automobiles
- Future Automobile

=== Leisure ===
- Abacus International Lanka
- Centara Ceysands Resort & Spa
- NH Collection Colombo

=== Sports ===
- Softlogic Holdings bought the ownership of Colombo Stars franchise ahead of the 2021 Lanka Premier League.
