= Softlogic Life Insurance =

Insurance company in Sri Lanka

Softlogic Life Insurance PLC
- Logo of Softlogic Life Insurance
- Formerly: Asian Alliance Insurance (1999-2016)
- Company type: Public
- Traded as: CSE: AAIC.N0000; S&P Sri Lanka 20 Index component
- ISIN: LK0314N00001
- Industry: Insurance
- Founded: April 21, 1999; 25 years ago
- Headquarters: One Galle Face, Colombo, Sri Lanka
- Number of locations: 116 (2023)
- Key people: Ashok Pathirage (Chairman); Iftikar Ahamed (Managing Director)
- Revenue: ▲LKR31.799 billion (2023)
- Operating income: ▼LKR3.197 billion (2023)
- Net income: ▲LKR2.838 billion (2023)
- Total assets: ▲LKR51.339 billion (2023)
- Total equity: ▲LKR13.333 billion (2023)
- Owners: Softlogic Capital PLC (51.72%); Dalvik Inclusion Pvt Ltd (19%); Milford (Ceylon) (19%)
- Number of employees: 999 (2022)
- Parent: Softlogic Capital PLC
- Website: softlogiclife.lk

Softlogic Life Insurance PLC, formerly known as Asian Alliance Insurance, is an insurance company in Sri Lanka. The company was founded in 1999 as Asian Alliance Insurance, a joint venture between Asia Capital PLC and Richard Pieris & Company. Softlogic Holdings and its subsidiary Softlogic Capital PLC acquired a controlling stake in the Asian Alliance Insurance in 2011 for LKR3.3 billion. The company segregated its life and non-life insurance businesses and then divested its non-life insurance to Fairfax Financial. The company changed its name in 2016 to Softlogic Life Insurance. The company is a constituent of the S&P Sri Lanka 20 Index. Softlogic Life is one of the LMD 100 companies in Sri Lanka. The company is also ranked among the 100 most valuable brands in the country.

== History ==
Asian Alliance Insurance was founded in 1999 as a joint venture between Asia Capital PLC and Richard Pieris & Company. Softlogic Holdings and its subsidiary Softlogic Capital PLC acquired a 73.5% of stake in Asian Alliance Insurance for LKR3.3 billion in 2011. Asia Capital PLC was the seller. When the announcement of Softlogic's acquisition came to light, Richard Pieris moved to incorporate a finance company and an insurance company. Richard Pieris also planned to move its insurance business out of Asian Alliance Insurance to the new venture. Richard Pieris accepted Softlogic Capital's mandatory offer and divested its 25% stake in Asian Alliance Insurance. Subsequently, Softlogic reduced its stake in the company by divesting 19% of the stake each to the development finance companies DEG and FMO for LKR1.8 billion in 2012.

The industry regulator, the Insurance Board of Sri Lanka, stipulated that insurance companies should segregate their life and non-life insurance businesses in 2015. Newly incorporated Asian Alliance General Insurance received the licence to operate in the non-life insurance sector. Softlogic sold Asian Alliance General Insurance to Fairfax Financial in 2016 for LKR1.1 billion. In the same year, the company was renamed Softlogic Life Insurance. Softlogic Life Insurance was featured in Forbes Asia's Best Under a Billion list in 2019.

== Operations ==
Softlogic Life Insurance was added to the S&P Sri Lanka 20 Index when an ad hoc index rebalancing occurred due to Commercial Leasing and Finance merging with LOLC Finance in March 2022. Softlogic Life is one of the LMD 100 companies in Sri Lanka. The company was ranked 60th in the 2021/22 edition of the list. LMD 100 is an annual list of listed companies in Sri Lanka by revenue. Brand Finance estimated the brand value of Softlogic Life Insurance to be LKR2,382 million in 2022, placing the company in the 44th in the brand value rankings in the country.

In 2022, the company recorded a market share of 17.1%, placing the company in second place among life insurance companies by gross written premiums. When the company's share price rose by 136%, Colombo Stock Exchange inquired the company twice about the unusual price movement. In a stock market disclosure, Softlogic Capital PLC stated that the company is considering a bid for Softlogic Life Insurance. The disclosure did not name the bidder. AIA Insurance Lanka Limited, the Sri Lankan subsidiary of AIA Group, had shown interest in the company.

Gross written premium market share of life insurance companies of Sri Lanka
Year	Ceylinco Life	Sri Lanka Insurance	Softlogic Life	AIA Life	Union Assurance	Others
2017	22.03	17.49	10.52	16.08	14.14	19.74
2018	22.18	16.45	12.46	15.87	14.00	19.04
2019	21.08	16.69	14.11	15.60	13.12	19.40
2020	21.43	18.70	15.20	13.64	12.73	18.30
2021	20.49	17.62	16.07	13.24	12.35	20.23

Source: Insurance Regulatory Commission of Sri Lanka, 2023 (p. 49)

== See also ==
- List of companies listed on the Colombo Stock Exchange
- List of Sri Lankan public corporations by market capitalisation
