= Simarjeet Singh =

Indian cricketer (born 1998)

Personal information
- Born: 17 January 1998 (age 28); Delhi, India
- Batting: Right handed
- Bowling: Right arm medium fast
- Role: Bowler

Domestic team information
- Years: Team
- 2018–present: Delhi
- 2022–2024: Chennai Super Kings
- 2025: Sunrisers Hyderabad

Career statistics
Competition	FC	LA	T20
Matches	15	23	37
Runs scored	117	55	12
Batting average	7.80	11.00	6.00
100s/50s	0/0	0/0	0/0
Top score	23*	25	3*
Balls bowled	2,546	1,010	709
Wickets	46	23	44
Bowling average	30.10	38.73	21.70
5 wickets in innings	1	0	0
10 wickets in match	0	–	–
Best bowling	5/75	4/36	3/16
Catches/stumpings	2/–	28/2	8/0
- Source: ESPNcricinfo, 28 March 2025

Simarjeet Singh (born 17 January 1998) is an Indian cricketer who represents Delhi in domestic cricket. He is a right handed batsman and right arm medium pacer.

== Career ==
Simarjeet made his List A debut for Delhi in the 2018–19 Vijay Hazare Trophy on 20 September 2018. He made his first-class debut for Delhi in the 2018–19 Ranji Trophy on 20 November 2018. He made his Twenty20 debut on 11 November 2019, for Delhi in the 2019–20 Syed Mushtaq Ali Trophy.

In June 2021, he was named as one of five net bowlers for India's tour of Sri Lanka. Following a positive case for COVID-19 in the Indian team, Singh was added to India's main squad for their final two Twenty20 International (T20I) matches of the tour.

In September 2021, Singh was added to the Mumbai Indians squad for the rest of the 2021 Indian Premier League tournament, replacing the injured Arjun Tendulkar. In February 2022, he was bought by the Chennai Super Kings in the auction for the 2022 Indian Premier League tournament.
