= V. Venkatram =

Indian cricketer (born 1956)

Vurity Venkatram
Personal information
- Born: 29 September 1956 (age 70); Jamshedpur, Bihar, India
- Batting: Right-handed
- Bowling: Right-arm off break
- Role: Bowler

Domestic team information
- Years: Team
- 1973/74–1991/92: Bihar

Career statistics
Competition	FC	List A
Matches	68	5
Runs scored	1,282	3
Batting average	22.10	1.50
100s/50s	0/5	0/0
Top score	84*	2*
Balls bowled	12,702	282
Wickets	217	5
Bowling average	26.52	37.80
5 wickets in innings	13	0
10 wickets in match	1	n/a
Best bowling	8/130	2/41
Catches/stumpings	38/–	1/–
- Source: ESPNcricinfo, 31 November 2015

Vurity Venkatram (born 29 September 1956) was a former Indian first-class cricketer who played 70+ First Class matches for Bihar cricket team from 1975-76 to 1991–92. He Captained Bihar Ranji Team for 1981-82 to 1986-87 season. After retirement, he became head coach of Jharkhand cricket team and he is a BCCI Certified Level ‘C’ Cricket Coach.

== Career ==
Venkatram was a right-arm off break bowler who represented Bihar cricket team. He played 68 first-class and 5 List A matches between the 1973/74 and 1991/92 seasons. He had a successful career as bowler, taking 217 wickets at an average of 26.52 with 13 five-wicket hauls. He was also a useful lower-order batsman with a first-class batting average of more than 22. He also went on to captain Bihar in a few matches and represent East Zone cricket team.

After his playing career, Venkatram took up the job of coaching. He became the coach of Tripura cricket team in 2000 and, in the 2004/05 season, he took up the same role with Jharkhand cricket team. Jharkhand had reached the Ranji semifinal during his tenure. In May 2008, he was appointed as the spin bowling coach of the National Cricket Academy. He had also been a coach at the National School of Cricket in Dehradun. He was named Jharkhand coach for a second time before the start of the 2014/15 domestic season. He is the chief coach of the Jharkhand Cricket Academy which functions in Jamshedpur.
