= Madhubahashini Disanayaka Ratnayaka =

Sri Lankan academic and author

Madhubhashini Disanayaka Ratnayaka is a Sri Lankan academic and author. Her novel There is Something I Have to Tell You won the Gratiaen Prize in 2011. She is the Head of English Language at the University of Sri Jayewardenepura.

== Early life ==
Madhubhashini Disanayaka Ratnayake is the daughter of Professor Emeritus J. B. Disanayaka. She was educated at Ladies' College, Colombo and went on to gain a BA at the University of Allahabad and won a Fulbright scholarship to study for a Masters in American and English Literature at the New York University.

== Works ==
The works she has authored include;

Novels
There is Something I have to Tell You

Short stories

- Driftwood (State Literary Award 1990)
- Tales of Shades and Shadow (Shortlist, Gratiaen Prize, 2001)
- A strange Tale of Love (Shortlist. Gratiaen Prize, 2004)

Radio plays

- Voices from Afar

Children's stories

- Raththa
- Animal Tales

Non fiction

- Contemporary Sinhala Fiction

== Awards and honors ==
- 2011: Gratiaen Prize, winner, There is Something I have to Tell You
- 2004: Gratiaen Prize, short-list, A strange Tale of Love
- 2001: Gratiaen Prize, short-list, Tales of Shades and Shadow
- 1990: State Literary Award, Best Collection of Short Stories in English, Driftwood
