= K-Zone Ja-Ela =

- Location: Kapuwatta, Ja-Ela, Colombo, Sri Lanka
- Coordinates: 7.0603°N 79.8959°E
- Address: 525 Colombo-Negombo Road, Ja-Ela, Sri Lanka
- Opened: October 2013; 13 years ago
- Closed: January 2024
- Manager: Susantha Ratnayake (Chairman/CEO)
- Owner: John Keells Holdings
- Architect: J
- Floor area: 13,000 m^{2} (140,000 sq ft)
- Floors: Ground and Mezzanine
- Parking: 135 approx

K-Zone was a two-storey shopping mall complex in the vicinity of the Kapuwatta suburb area of Ja-Ela, outside Colombo, Sri Lanka.

In 2011 John Keells Holdings acquired the 2.4 ha (5.9 acres) site on the Colombo-Negombo Road. The 13,000 m^{2} (140,000 sq ft) building, was constructed at a cost of Rs 119 million, and is owned and operated by John Keells Holdings. It was opened to the public in October 2013. It was permanently closed in January 2024 due to John Keels Holdings' plans to construct a residential complex ("Viman Ja-Ela") on the property.
