= Tushar Deshpande =

Indian cricketer (born 1995)

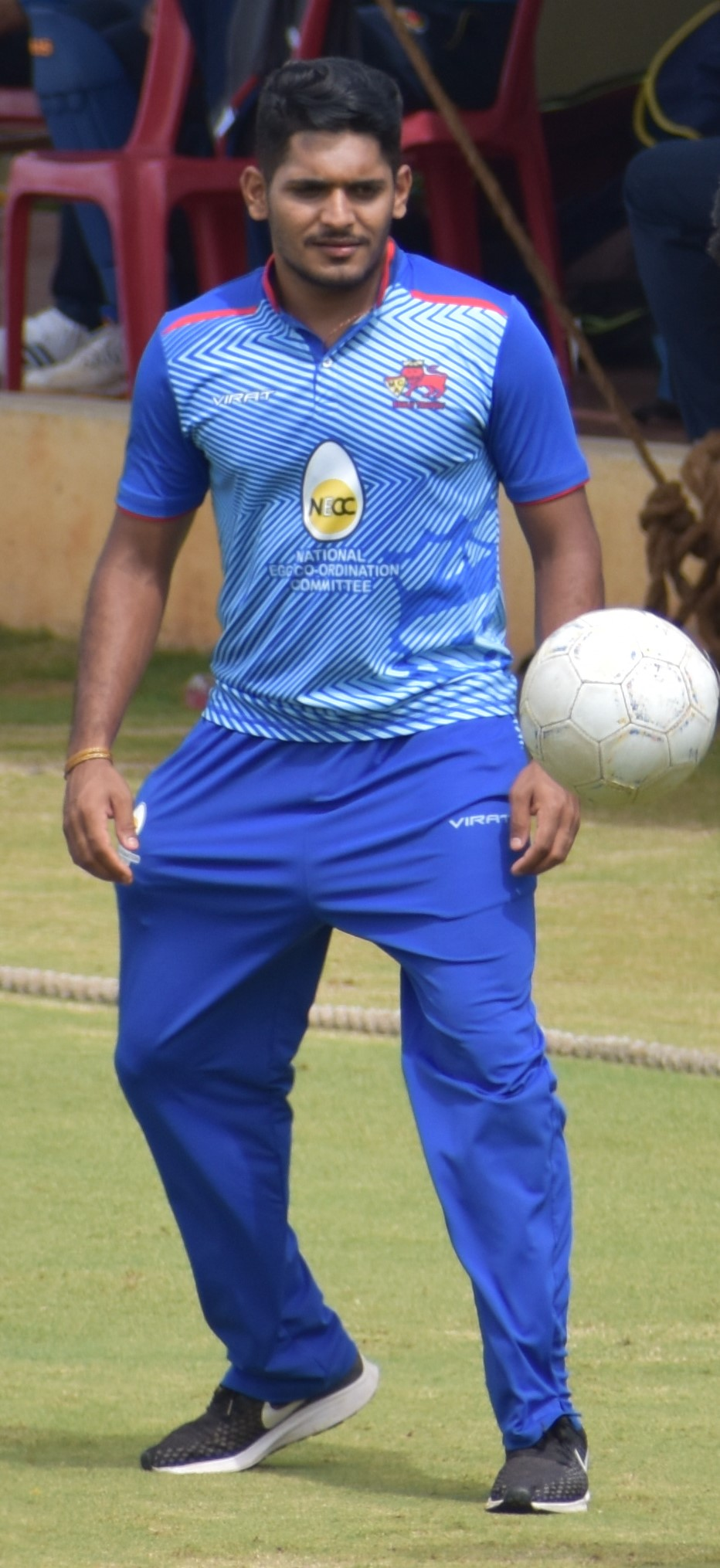
- Deshpande during the 2019–20 Vijay Hazare Trophy

Personal information
- Full name: Tushar Uday Deshpande
- Born: 15 May 1995 (age 31); Kalyan, Maharashtra, India
- Height: 5 ft 10 in (178 cm)
- Batting: Left-handed
- Bowling: Right-arm medium
- Role: Bowler

International information
- National side: India
- T20I debut (cap 115): 13 July 2024 v Zimbabwe
- Last T20I: 14 July 2024 v Zimbabwe
- T20I shirt no.: 36

Domestic team information
- Years: Team
- 2015–present: Mumbai
- 2020: Delhi Capitals
- 2022–2024: Chennai Super Kings
- 2025-present: Rajasthan Royals

Career statistics
Competition	T20I	FC	LA	T20
Matches	2	36	40	90
Runs scored	0	511	51	51
Batting average	–	14.19	8.50	7.28
100s/50s	0/0	1/1	0/0	0/0
Top score	–	123	24	20*
Balls bowled	36	5,154	1,801	1,916
Wickets	2	97	51	124
Bowling average	27.50	29.09	32.86	22.54
5 wickets in innings	0	5	1	0
10 wickets in match	–	0	–	0
Best bowling	1/25	6/70	5/23	4/13
Catches/stumpings	2/–	11/–	8/–	15/–
- Source: ESPNcricinfo, 30 April 2025

Tushar Deshpande (born 15 May 1995) is an Indian cricketer who has played for Indian national cricket team. He debuted for Indian team in July 2024 against Zimbabwe. He plays for Mumbai in domestic cricket and for Rajasthan Royals in the Indian Premier League. He is a right-arm medium pace bowler.

In August 2019, he was named in the India Blue team's squad for the 2019–20 Duleep Trophy. In the 2020 IPL auction, he was bought by the Delhi Capitals ahead of the 2020 Indian Premier League. In February 2022, he was bought by the Chennai Super Kings in the auction for the 2022 Indian Premier League tournament. He became the first Impact Player in the IPL history. In July 2024, he was included in India's squad for T20 series against Zimbabwe.
