= Kandy City Centre =

- Location: Kandy, Sri Lanka
- Coordinates: 7.2922°N 80.6369°E
- Address: 5 Dalada Veediya, Kandy
- Opened: December 2008
- Manager: Thusitha Wijayasena, Chairman
- Owner: Property Finance and Investments Kandy (Pvt) Ltd
- Architect: Chandra Abeyasinghe (AMC Architects); Ashley de Vos (ADV Consultants)
- Floor area: 44,000 sqm
- Website: www.kandycitycentre.lk

Kandy City Centre is a ten-storey commercial and retail complex which is located in Kandy, Sri Lanka near the Temple of Tooth Relic. Construction of the centre was started in 1993 and opened in 2008. The complex was the vision of Thusitha Wijayasena and undertaken by his company, Property Finance and Investments Kandy (Pvt) Ltd.

== Construction ==
The 5 ha (12 acres) site upon which this complex was built was owned by Walker Sons and Company and was occupied by a number of buildings including a cinema and other stores before the site was cleared in 1993. The construction of the centre was abandoned in 1998 due to several reasons and recommenced four years later in 2003. It was completed in 2005 but not formally opened until December 2008. The building was designed by AMC Architects of Singapore, in collaboration with local architecture firm, ADV Consultants and was constructed by Maga Engineering. This building was one of the first buildings in Sri Lanka to have an underground floor. This is also the only Board of Investment (BOI) approved project in Sri Lanka, which has been granted the flagship status.

== Design and features ==
The complex was designed with ultramodern features whilst incorporating the traditional architecture of Kandy. The Board of Investment has granted the prestigious "Flagship Status" to this project. The centre contains several leading banks, a fully equipped supermarket, modern restaurants, an entertainment zone including a cinema complex, a multi-cuisine food court, book store, florists, local and international clothing stores, perfume stores, an Ayurveda site and stalls of leading companies in Sri Lanka. There is a five-level car park outside managed separately by the Kandy Municipal Council and is the largest car park in Kandy.

The complex has fourteen elevators. Six of the ten floors has direct road access due to the innovative design of the complex. In addition 2,000 telephone lines, a 3MW full-time backup power and an ultra modern security system.

== See also ==
Other shopping complexes in Sri Lanka,

- Majestic City, Colombo
- Arcade Independence Square, Colombo
- Colombo City Centre, Colombo
