= 2021 Indian Premier League final =

Cricket match

- Event: 2021 Indian Premier League
Chennai Super Kings	Kolkata Knight Riders
192/3	165/9
20 overs	20 overs
- Chennai Super Kings won by 27 runs
- Date: 15 October 2021
- Venue: Dubai International Cricket Stadium, Dubai
- Player of the match: Faf du Plessis (CSK)
- Umpires: Richard Illingworth (Eng); Nitin Menon (Ind)
- Attendance: 18,453

The 2021 Indian Premier League final was played on 15 October 2021 at the Dubai International Cricket Stadium in UAE. It was a Day/Night Twenty20 match, which decided the winner of 2021 season of the Indian Premier League (IPL), an annual Twenty20 tournament in India. Originally scheduled to be held on 30 May 2021 at the Narendra Modi Stadium in Ahmedabad, the tournament, along with the final, was suspended in May 2021 due to the COVID-19 pandemic, and was relocated to the United Arab Emirates. Chennai Super Kings won the match by 27 runs beating Kolkata Knight Riders, to win their fourth IPL title.

== Background ==
On 7 March 2021, the Board of Control for Cricket in India (BCCI) announced the full schedule for the IPL. Six venues were chosen, with the Narendra Modi Stadium in Ahmedabad hosting 12 matches including the playoffs and the final. After the relocation to UAE, Dubai, which was also the host of the 2020 final, was chosen to host the final on 15 October.

== Road to the final ==
Source: ESPNcricinfo

Chennai Super Kings			vs	Kolkata Knight Riders
League Stage
Opponent	Scorecard	Result	Titles	Opponent	Scorecard	Result
Delhi Capitals	10 April 2021	Lost	Match 1	Sunrisers Hyderabad	11 April 2021	Won
Punjab Kings	16 April 2021	Won	Match 2	Mumbai Indians	13 April 2021	Lost
Rajasthan Royals	19 April 2021	Won	Match 3	Royal Challengers Bangalore	18 April 2021	Lost
Kolkata Knight Riders	21 April 2021	Won	Match 4	Chennai Super Kings	21 April 2021	Lost
Royal Challengers Bangalore	25 April 2021	Won	Match 5	Rajasthan Royals	24 April 2021	Lost
Sunrisers Hyderabad	28 April 2021	Won	Match 6	Punjab Kings	26 April 2021	Won
Mumbai Indians	01 May 2021	Lost	Match 7	Delhi Capitals	28 April 2021	Lost
Mumbai Indians	19 September 2021	Won	Match 8	Royal Challengers Bangalore	20 September 2021	Won
Royal Challengers Bangalore	24 September 2021	Won	Match 9	Mumbai Indians	23 September 2021	Won
Kolkata Knight Riders	26 September 2021	Won	Match 10	Chennai Super Kings	26 September 2021	Lost
Sunrisers Hyderabad	30 September 2021	Won	Match 11	Delhi Capitals	28 September 2021	Won
Rajasthan Royals	02 October 2021	Lost	Match 12	Punjab Kings	01 October 2021	Lost
Delhi Capitals	04 October 2021	Lost	Match 13	Sunrisers Hyderabad	03 October 2021	Won
Punjab Kings	07 October 2021	Lost	Match 14	Rajasthan Royals	07 October 2021	Won
Playoff stage
Qualifier 1				Eliminator
Opponent	Scorecard	Result	Titles	Opponent	Scorecard	Result
Delhi Capitals	10 October 2021	Won	Match 15	Royal Challengers Bangalore	11 October 2021	Won
				Qualifier 2
				Opponent	Scorecard	Result
			Match 16	Delhi Capitals	13 October 2021	Won
2021 Indian Premier League final

=== Group stage ===
The Chennai Super Kings started their campaign with a 7-wicket loss against Delhi Capitals in Mumbai. They went on to win five consecutive matches, before their run was brought to an end by Mumbai Indians. CSK started the UAE leg of the tournament with four wins, but lost their final three group matches. They ended the group stage with 9 wins and 5 losses, finishing second in the table behind Delhi Capitals.

Kolkata Knight Riders started with a 10-run win over Sunrisers Hyderabad in Chennai, but won only one of their next six games in India. In the UAE leg, Kolkata started with a 9-wicket win over Royal Challengers Bangalore. They won four of their remaining six matches and ended the group stage with 7 wins and 7 losses. Kolkata qualified as the fourth placed team after Mumbai Indians failed to beat Hyderabad by the required margin on the last day of the group stage.

=== League stage matches between finalists ===
21 April 2021
19:30 (N)
Scorecard

Chennai Super Kings; 220/3 (20 overs)	v	Kolkata Knight Riders; 202 (19.1 overs)

Chennai won by 18 runs
Wankhede Stadium, Mumbai
Player of the match: Faf du Plessis (Chennai)

26 September 2021
15:30 (D/N)
Scorecard

Kolkata Knight Riders; 171/6 (20 overs)	v	Chennai Super Kings; 172/8 (20 overs)

Chennai won by 2 wickets
Sheikh Zayed Cricket Stadium, Abu Dhabi
Player of the match: Ravindra Jadeja (Chennai)

Chennai won both the games played between the sides in the group stage, first one by 18 runs in Mumbai on 21 April, and second one by 2 wickets in Abu Dhabi on 26 September.

=== Playoffs ===
In the playoffs, Chennai Super Kings, as the second-placed team, played in the first qualifier against Delhi in Dubai, whereas Kolkata Knight Riders played in the eliminator against Royal Challengers Bangalore.

Qualifier 1
10 October 2021
19:30 (N)
Scorecard

Delhi Capitals; 172/5 (20 overs)	v	Chennai Super Kings; 173/6 (19.4 overs)

Chennai won by 4 wickets
Dubai International Cricket Stadium, Dubai
Player of the match: Ruturaj Gaikwad (Chennai)

Eliminator
11 October 2021
19:30 (N)
Scorecard

Royal Challengers Bangalore; 138/7 (20 overs)	v	Kolkata Knight Riders; 139/6 (19.4 overs)

Kolkata won by 4 wickets
Sharjah Cricket Stadium, Sharjah
Player of the match: Sunil Narine (Kolkata)

Chennai qualified directly for the final, and Kolkata advanced to the second qualifier to play against the Capitals.

Qualifier 2
13 October 2021
19:30 (N)
Scorecard

Delhi Capitals; 135/5 (20 overs)	v	Kolkata Knight Riders; 136/7 (19.5 overs)

Kolkata won by 3 wickets
Sharjah Cricket Stadium, Sharjah
Player of the match: Venkatesh Iyer (Kolkata)

Kolkata beat Delhi and qualified for their first final since 2014, and their third final overall.

== Match ==
=== Match officials ===
- On-field umpires: Richard Illingworth (Eng) and Nitin Menon (Ind)
- Third umpire: Sundaram Ravi (Ind)
- Reserve umpire: Virender Sharma (Ind)
- Match referee: Javagal Srinath (Ind)
- Toss: Kolkata Knight Riders won the toss and elected to field.

=== Summary ===
Eoin Morgan of the Kolkata Knight Riders won the toss and elected to put the opposition, Chennai Super Kings to bat. The Super Kings scored a total of 192 runs in their 20 overs, with Faf du Plessis scoring the highest with 86 runs from 59 balls. Chasing 193 runs for victory, the Knight Riders fell short and scored 165 runs in 20 overs for the loss of 9 wickets. Shardul Thakur was the highest wicket taker taking 3 wickets for 38 runs. The Super Kings won their fourth Indian Premier League Championship by winning the game by 27 runs. Du Plessis was declared as the player of the match.

=== Chennai Super Kings Innings ===
Batting first, the Super Kings had Indian batsman Ruturaj Gaikwad and South African batsman Faf du Plessis open the innings. In the first powerplay consisting of the mandatory six overs, the pair put on a total of 50 runs and remained unbeaten, with Gaikwad at 26 and du Plessis at 22 runs. The pair put on an additional 11 runs in the next two overs to reach a total of 61 runs at the first strategic timeout during which Gaikwad surpassed KL Rahul as holder of the Orange Cap. Du Plessis continued his fine form and brought up his 50 from 35 balls, including two sixes and five fours. Gaikwad was the first wicket to fall, when he was out caught by Shivam Mavi off the bowling of Sunil Narine scoring a total of 32 runs, bringing former Indian batter Robin Uthappa to the crease. Du Plessis and Uthappa put on a total of 63 runs for the second wicket before Uthappa was out leg before wicket to Narine for a score of 31, at a strike rate of over 200. The Super Kings brought up their 150 runs at the end of the 17th over. English cricketer Moeen Ali joined du Plesis to contribute a quickfire 37 from 20 balls. The team went on to score 192 for the loss of 3 wickets, with du Plessis being out caught by Venkatesh Iyer at long-on off the bowling of Mavi at the last ball of the innings. Ali remained unbeaten. Narine was the pick of the bowlers taking a total of 2 wickets conceding 26 runs, while Mavi took 1 wicket for 32 runs.

=== Kolkata Knight Riders Innings ===
Chasing a total of 193 to win from 20 overs, the Knight Riders opened with Shubman Gill and Venkatesh Iyer. The duo got off to a healthy start scoring a total of 55 runs in the first mandatory power play of six overs. The pair scored an additional four runs at the end of 7 overs when the Super Kings brought in their first strategic time out, with Gill unbeaten at 23 and Iyer unbeaten at 34. Iyer went on to bring up his 50 from 31 balls with a total of 3 sixes and 5 fours. However, the flow was interrupted when Iyer was dismissed by Shardul Thakur with Ravindra Jadeja taking a simple catch at deep cover for a lofted shot by Iyer. This triggered a fall of wickets, with Thakur claiming Nitish Rana off the very next ball, caught by du Plesis. Knight Riders lost the next four wickets having added only 27 runs, ending at 120 runs for the loss of 6 wickets during the next strategic time out taken at the end of the 15th over. New Zealand all-rounder Lockie Ferguson and Indian bowler Shivam Mavi mounted a late resistance, but, was not sufficient to get the team to the winning score. Knight Riders ended the innings at 165 runs for the loss of 9 wickets enabling a Super Kings win by 27 runs. Thakur was the pick of the bowlers taking 3 wickets while conceding 38 runs, while Josh Hazlewood and Jadeja took 2 wickets each.

Faf du Plesis was declared the player of the match in what was also his 100th game in the Indian Premier League. This was the Chennai Super Kings' fourth Indian Premier League championship victory.

15 October 2021
19:30 (N)
Scorecard

Chennai Super Kings; 192/3 (20 overs)	v	Kolkata Knight Riders; 165/9 (20 overs)
Faf du Plessis 86 (59); Sunil Narine 2/26 (4 overs)		Shubman Gill 51 (43); Shardul Thakur 3/38 (4 overs)

Chennai Super Kings won by 27 runs
Dubai International Cricket Stadium, Dubai
Umpires: Richard Illingworth (Eng) and Nitin Menon (Ind)
Player of the match: Faf du Plessis (Chennai Super Kings)

- Kolkata Knight Riders won the toss and elected to field.

=== Scorecard ===
Source: ESPNcricinfo

Chennai Super Kings innings
Batsman	Method of dismissal	Runs	Balls	Strike rate
Ruturaj Gaikwad	c Mavi b Narine	32	27	118.51
Faf du Plessis	c Iyer b Mavi	86	59	145.76
Robin Uthappa	lbw b Narine	31	15	206.66
Moeen Ali	not out	37	20	185.00
Ambati Rayudu	did not bat			
MS Dhoni* †	did not bat			
Ravindra Jadeja	did not bat			
Dwayne Bravo	did not bat			
Shardul Thakur	did not bat			
Deepak Chahar	did not bat			
Josh Hazlewood	did not bat			
Extras	(1 b, 1lb, 1nb, 3wd)	6		
Totals	(20 overs, 9.60 runs per over)	192/3		

Fall of wickets: 1–61 (Gaikwad, 8.1 overs), 2–124 (Uthappa, 13.3 overs), 3–192 (du Plessis, 19.6 overs)

Kolkata Knight Riders bowling
Bowler	Overs	Maidens	Runs	Wickets	Economy
Shakib Al Hasan	3	0	33	0	11.00
Shivam Mavi	4	0	32	1	8.00
Lockie Ferguson	4	0	56	0	14.00
Varun Chakravarthy	4	0	38	0	9.50
Sunil Narine	4	0	26	2	6.50
Venkatesh Iyer	1	0	5	0	5.00

Kolkata Knight Riders innings
Batsman	Method of dismissal	Runs	Balls	Strike rate
Shubman Gill	lbw b Chahar	51	46	118.60
Venkatesh Iyer	c Jadeja b Thakur	50	32	156.25
Nitish Rana	c du Plessis b Thakur	0	1	0.00
Sunil Narine	c Jadeja b Hazlewood	2	2	100.00
Eoin Morgan*	c Chahar b Hazlewood	2	4	50.00
Dinesh Karthik †	c Rayudu b Jadeja	9	7	128.57
Shakib Al Hasan	lbw b Jadeja	0	1	0.00
Rahul Tripathi	c Ali b Thakur	2	3	66.67
Lockie Ferguson	not out	18	11	163.64
Shivam Mavi	c Chahar b Bravo	20	13	153.85
Varun Chakravarthy	not out	0	0	-
Extras	(1nb, 8wd)	9		
Totals	(20 overs, 8.25 runs per over)	165/9		

Fall of wickets: 1–91 (Iyer, 10.4 overs), 2–93 (Rana, 10.6 overs), 3–97 (Narine, 11.3 overs), 4–108 (Gill, 13.2 overs), 5–119 (Karthik, 14.5 overs), 6–120 (Shakib, 14.6 overs), 7–123 (Tripathi, 15.4 overs), 8–125 (Morgan, 16.3 overs), 9–164 (Mavi, 19.5 overs)

Chennai Super Kings bowling
Bowler	Overs	Maidens	Runs	Wickets	Economy
Deepak Chahar	4	0	32	1	8.00
Josh Hazlewood	4	0	29	2	7.25
Shardul Thakur	4	0	38	3	9.50
Dwayne Bravo	4	0	29	1	7.25
Ravindra Jadeja	4	0	37	2	9.25
