= 2021 Kolkata Knight Riders season =

Kolkata Knight Riders in 2021

Kolkata Knight Riders
2021 season
- Coach: Brendon McCullum
- Captain: Eoin Morgan
- Ground(s): Eden Gardens
- 2021 Indian Premier League: Runner up
- Most runs: Shubman Gill (478)
- Most wickets: Varun Chakravarthy (18)

The 2021 season was the 14th season for the Indian Premier League (IPL) franchise Kolkata Knight Riders (KKR). They were one of the eight teams that competed in the 2021 IPL. The franchise won the tournament in 2012 and 2014. The team was captained by Eoin Morgan with Brendon McCullum as the team coach. They finished their 2021 IPL campaign as runners-up.

== Background ==
=== Player retention and transfers ===
The franchise retained 17 players and released six players.

Retained
Eoin Morgan, Andre Russell, Dinesh Karthik, Kamlesh Nagarkoti, Kuldeep Yadav, Lockie Ferguson, Nitish Rana, Prasidh Krishna, Rinku Singh, Sandeep Warrier, Shivam Mavi, Shubman Gill, Sunil Narine, Pat Cummins, Rahul Tripathi, Varun Chakravarthy, Tim Seifert

Released
Chris Green, Harry Gurney, M Siddharth, Nikhil Naik, Siddhesh Lad, Tom Banton

Added
Harbhajan Singh, Shakib Al Hasan, Sheldon Jackson, Vaibhav Arora, Venkatesh Iyer, Karun Nair, Ben Cutting

== Squad ==
- Players with international caps are listed in **bold**.

No.	Name	Nationality	Birth date	Batting style	Bowling style	Year signed	Salary	Notes
Batsmen
16	**Eoin Morgan**	England	10 September 1986 (aged 34)	Left-handed	Right-arm medium	2020	₹5.25 crore (US$545,000)	Overseas; Captain
18	**Gurkeerat Singh**	India	29 June 1990 (aged 30)	Right-handed	Right-arm off break	2021	₹50 lakh (US$52,000)	Replacement for Rinku Singh
27	**Nitish Rana**	India	27 December 1993 (aged 27)	Left-handed	Right-arm off break	2018	₹3.4 crore (US$353,000)	
35	Rinku Singh	India	12 October 1997 (aged 23)	Left-handed	Right-arm off break	2018	₹80 lakh (US$83,000)	Unavailable due to knee injury
52	Rahul Tripathi	India	2 March 1991 (aged 30)	Right-handed	Right-arm fast medium	2020	₹60 lakh (US$62,000)	
66	**Karun Nair**	India	6 December 1991 (aged 29)	Right-handed	Right-arm off break	2021	₹50 lakh (US$52,000)	
77	**Shubman Gill**	India	8 September 1999 (aged 21)	Right-handed	Right-arm off break	2018	₹1.8 crore (US$187,000)	
All-Rounder
12	**Andre Russell**	Jamaica	29 April 1988 (aged 32)	Right-handed	Right-arm fast-medium	2018	₹7 crore (US$726,897.50)	Overseas, Injured
15	**Pawan Negi**	India	6 January 1993 (aged 28)	Left-handed	Left-arm orthodox	2021	₹50 lakh (US$52,000)	
25	Venkatesh Iyer	India	25 December 1994 (aged 26)	Left-handed	Right-arm medium	2021	₹20 lakh (US$21,000)	
31	**Ben Cutting**	Australia	30 January 1987 (aged 34)	Right-handed	Right-arm fast-medium	2021	₹75 lakh (US$78,000)	Overseas
75	**Shakib Al Hasan**	Bangladesh	24 March 1987 (aged 34)	Left-handed	Left-arm orthodox	2021	₹3.2 crore (US$332,000)	Overseas
Wicket-Keepers
19	**Dinesh Karthik**	India	1 June 1985 (aged 35)	Right-handed	Right-arm off break	2018	₹7.4 crore (US$768,434.50)	Vice-captain
21	Sheldon Jackson	India	27 September 1986 (aged 34)	Right-handed	Right-arm off break	2021	₹20 lakh (US$21,000)	
43	**Tim Seifert**	New Zealand	14 December 1994 (aged 26)	Right-handed	Right-arm fast-medium	2020	₹20 lakh (US$21,000)	Overseas
Spin-Bowlers
3	**Harbhajan Singh**	India	3 July 1980 (aged 40)	Right-handed	Right-arm off break	2021	₹2 crore (US$210,000)	
23	**Kuldeep Yadav**	India	14 December 1994 (aged 26)	Left-handed	Left-arm unorthodox	2018	₹5.8 crore (US$602,000)	
29	**Varun Chakravarthy**	India	29 August 1991 (aged 29)	Right-handed	Right-arm leg break	2020	₹4 crore (US$420,000)	
74	**Sunil Narine**	Trinidad and Tobago	26 May 1988 (aged 32)	Left-handed	Right-arm off break	2018	₹8.5 crore (US$882,661.30)	Overseas
Pace Bowlers
5	Kamlesh Nagarkoti	India	28 December 1999 (aged 21)	Right-handed	Right-arm fast	2018	₹3.2 crore (US$332,000)	
14	Vaibhav Arora	India	14 December 1997 (aged 23)	Right-handed	Right-arm fast-medium	2021	₹20 lakh (US$21,000)	
24	**Prasidh Krishna**	India	19 February 1996 (aged 25)	Right-handed	Right-arm fast-medium	2018	₹20 lakh (US$21,000)	
26	Shivam Mavi	India	26 November 1998 (aged 22)	Right-handed	Right-arm fast-medium	2018	₹3 crore (US$312,000)	
30	**Pat Cummins**	Australia	8 May 1993 (aged 27)	Right-handed	Right-arm fast	2020	₹15.5 crore (US$1.6 million)	Overseas, Unavailable due to Personal reasons
43	**Tim Southee**	New Zealand	11 December 1988 (aged 32)	Right-handed	Right-arm fast-medium	2021	₹75 lakh (US$78,000)	Overseas, Replacement for Pat Cummins
63	**Sandeep Warrier**	India	4 April 1991 (aged 30)	Right-handed	Right-arm medium-fast	2019	₹20 lakh (US$21,000)	
69	**Lockie Ferguson**	New Zealand	13 June 1991 (aged 29)	Right-handed	Right-arm fast	2019	₹1.6 crore (US$170,000)	Overseas
Source: KKR Players

== Administration and support staff ==
Position	Name
Owner	Shah Rukh Khan (Red Chillies Entertainment), Jay Mehta (Mehta Group)
CEO and Managing Director	Venky Mysore
Team manager	Wayne Bentley
Head coach	Brendon McCullum
Assistant coach	Abhishek Nayar
Mentor	David Hussey
Bowling coach	Kyle Mills
Fielding coach	James Foster
Head Physiotherapist	Kamlesh Jain
Strength and Conditioning coach	Chris Donaldson
Source: KKR Staff

== Kit manufacturers and sponsors ==
Kit manufacturer	Shirt sponsor (chest)	Shirt sponsor (back)	Chest Branding
Wrogn Active	MPL	Unacademy	Lux Cozi
Source :kkr.in

T20 uniform

== Teams and standings ==
=== Results by match ===
Round	1	2	3	4	5	6	7	8	9	10	11	12	13	14
Result	W	L	L	L	L	W	L	W	W	L	W	L	W	W
Position	2	5	6	6	8	5	7	5	4	4	4	4	4	4

Source: Fixtures
W = Win; L = Loss; NR = No Result

=== League table ===
Pos	Team	Pld	W	L	NR	Pts	NRR	
1	Delhi Capitals (3rd)	14	10	4	0	20	0.481	Advanced to Qualifier 1
2	Chennai Super Kings (C)	14	9	5	0	18	0.455	Advanced to Qualifier 1
3	Royal Challengers Bangalore (4th)	14	9	5	0	18	−0.140	Advanced to the Eliminator
4	Kolkata Knight Riders (R)	14	7	7	0	14	0.587	Advanced to the Eliminator
5	Mumbai Indians	14	7	7	0	14	0.116	
6	Punjab Kings	14	6	8	0	12	−0.001	
7	Rajasthan Royals	14	5	9	0	10	−0.993	
8	Sunrisers Hyderabad	14	3	11	0	6	−0.545	

Source: ESPNcricinfo
(C) Champions; (R) Runners-up
The four top-ranked teams qualified for the playoffs.

== League stage ==
The full schedule was published on the IPL website on 7 March 2021.

=== Matches ===
Match 3
11 April 2021
19:30 (N)
Scorecard

Kolkata Knight Riders; 187/6 (20 overs)	v	Sunrisers Hyderabad; 177/5 (20 overs)
Nitish Rana 80 (56); Rashid Khan 2/24 (4 overs)		Manish Pandey 61* (44); Prasidh Krishna 2/35 (4 overs)

Kolkata Knight Riders won by 10 runs
M. A. Chidambaram Stadium, Chennai
Umpires: K. N. Ananthapadmanabhan (Ind) and Nitin Menon (Ind)
Player of the match: Nitish Rana (Kolkata Knight Riders)

- Sunrisers Hyderabad won the toss and elected to field.
- This was the 100th win in the IPL for Kolkata Knight Riders.

Match 5
13 April 2021
19:30 (N)
Scorecard

Mumbai Indians; 152 (20 overs)	v	Kolkata Knight Riders; 142/7 (20 overs)
Suryakumar Yadav 56 (36); Andre Russell 5/15 (2 overs)		Nitish Rana 57 (47); Rahul Chahar 4/27 (4 overs)

Mumbai Indians won by 10 runs
M. A. Chidambaram Stadium, Chennai
Umpires: Chris Gaffaney (NZ) and Chettithody Shamshuddin (Ind)
Player of the match: Rahul Chahar (Mumbai Indians)

- Kolkata Knight Riders won the toss and elected to field.

Match 10
18 April 2021
15:30 (D/N)
Scorecard

Royal Challengers Bangalore; 204/4 (20 overs)	v	Kolkata Knight Riders; 166/8 (20 overs)
Glenn Maxwell 78 (49); Varun Chakravarthy 2/39 (4 overs)		Andre Russell 31 (20); Kyle Jamieson 3/41 (3 overs)

Royal Challengers Bangalore won by 38 runs
M. A. Chidambaram Stadium, Chennai
Umpires: Nitin Menon (Ind) and Chettithody Shamshuddin (Ind)
Player of the match: AB de Villiers (Royal Challengers Bangalore)

- Royal Challengers Bangalore won the toss and elected to bat.

Match 15
21 April 2021
19:30 (N)
Scorecard

Chennai Super Kings; 220/3 (20 overs)	v	Kolkata Knight Riders; 202 (19.1 overs)
Faf du Plessis 95* (60); Andre Russell 1/27 (2 overs)		Pat Cummins 66* (34); Deepak Chahar 4/29 (4 overs)

Chennai Super Kings won by 18 runs
Wankhede Stadium, Mumbai
Umpires: Anil Dandekar (Ind) and Paul Reiffel (Aus)
Player of the match: Faf du Plessis (Chennai Super Kings)

- Kolkata Knight Riders won the toss and elected to field.

Match 18
24 April 2021
19:30 (N)
Scorecard

Kolkata Knight Riders; 133/9 (20 overs)	v	Rajasthan Royals; 134/4 (18.5 overs)
Rahul Tripathi 36 (26); Chris Morris 4/23 (4 overs)		Sanju Samson 42* (41); Varun Chakravarthy 2/32 (4 overs)

Rajasthan Royals won by 6 wickets
Wankhede Stadium, Mumbai
Umpires: Sundaram Ravi (Ind) and Navdeep Singh (Ind)
Player of the match: Chris Morris (Rajasthan Royals)

- Rajasthan Royals won the toss and elected to field.

Match 21
26 April 2021
19:30 (N)
Scorecard

Punjab Kings; 123/9 (20 overs)	v	Kolkata Knight Riders; 126/5 (16.4 overs)
Mayank Agarwal 31 (34); Prasidh Krishna 3/30 (4 overs)		Eoin Morgan 47* (40); Moises Henriques 1/5 (1 over)

Kolkata Knight Riders won 5 wickets
Narendra Modi Stadium, Ahmedabad
Umpires: Yeshwant Barde (Ind) and Paul Reiffel (Aus)
Player of the match: Eoin Morgan (Kolkata Knight Riders)

- Kolkata Knight Riders won the toss and elected to field.

Match 25
29 April 2021
19:30 (N)
Scorecard

Kolkata Knight Riders; 154/6 (20 overs)	v	Delhi Capitals; 156/3 (16.3 overs)
Andre Russell 45* (27); Lalit Yadav 2/13 (3 overs)		Prithvi Shaw 82 (41); Pat Cummins 3/24 (4 overs)

Delhi Capitals won by 7 wickets
Narendra Modi Stadium, Ahmedabad
Umpires: Yeshwant Barde (Ind) and Anil Chaudhary (Ind)
Player of the match: Prithvi Shaw (Delhi Capitals)

- Delhi Capitals won the toss and elected to field.

Match 31
20 September 2021
19:30 (N)
Scorecard

Royal Challengers Bangalore; 92 (19 overs)	v	Kolkata Knight Riders; 94/1 (10 overs)
Devdutt Padikkal 22 (20); Andre Russell 3/9 (3 overs)		Shubman Gill 48 (34); Yuzvendra Chahal 1/23 (2 overs)

Kolkata Knight Riders won by 9 wickets
Sheikh Zayed Cricket Stadium, Abu Dhabi
Umpires: Chris Gaffaney (NZ) and Sundaram Ravi (Ind)
Player of the match: Varun Chakravarthy (Kolkata Knight Riders)

- Royal Challengers Bangalore won the toss and elected to bat.
- Virat Kohli (Royal Challengers Bangalore) became the first player to play 200 matches for a single franchise.

Match 34
23 September 2021
19:30 (N)
Scorecard

Mumbai Indians; 155/6 (20 overs)	v	Kolkata Knight Riders; 159/3 (15.1 overs)
Quinton de Kock 55 (42); Lockie Ferguson 2/27 (4 overs)		Rahul Tripathi 74* (42); Jasprit Bumrah 3/43 (4 overs)

Kolkata Knight Riders won by 7 wickets
Sheikh Zayed Cricket Stadium, Abu Dhabi
Umpires: Sundaram Ravi (Ind) and Virender Sharma (Ind)
Player of the match: Sunil Narine (Kolkata Knight Riders)

- Kolkata Knight Riders won the toss and elected to field.

Match 38
26 September 2021
15:30 (D/N)
Scorecard

Kolkata Knight Riders; 171/6 (20 overs)	v	Chennai Super Kings; 172/8 (20 overs)
Rahul Tripathi 45 (33); Shardul Thakur 2/20 (4 overs)		Faf du Plessis 43 (30); Sunil Narine 3/41 (4 overs)

Chennai Super Kings won by 2 wickets
Sheikh Zayed Cricket Stadium, Abu Dhabi
Umpires: Chris Gaffaney (NZ) and Tapan Sharma (Ind)
Player of the match: Ravindra Jadeja (Chennai Super Kings)

- Kolkata Knight Riders won the toss and elected to bat.

Match 41
28 September 2021
15:30 (D/N)
Scorecard

Delhi Capitals; 127/9 (20 overs)	v	Kolkata Knight Riders; 130/7 (18.2 overs)
Steve Smith 39 (34); Lockie Ferguson 2/10 (2 overs)		Nitish Rana 36* (27); Avesh Khan 3/13 (3 overs)

Kolkata Knight Riders won by 3 wickets
Sharjah Cricket Stadium, Sharjah
Umpires: Saiyed Khalid (Ind) and Nitin Menon (Ind)
Player of the match: Sunil Narine (Kolkata Knight Riders)

- Kolkata Knight Riders won the toss and elected to field.

Match 45
1 October 2021
19:30 (N)
Scorecard

Kolkata Knight Riders; 165/7 (20 overs)	v	Punjab Kings; 168/5 (19.3 overs)
Venkatesh Iyer 67 (49); Arshdeep Singh 3/32 (4 overs)		KL Rahul 67 (55); Varun Chakravarthy 2/24 (4 overs)

Punjab Kings won by 5 wickets
Dubai International Cricket Stadium, Dubai
Umpires: K. N. Ananthapadmanabhan (Ind) and Richard Illingworth (Eng)
Player of the match: KL Rahul (Punjab Kings)

- Punjab Kings won the toss and elected to field.
- Delhi Capitals qualified for the playoffs as a result of this match.

Match 49
3 October 2021
19:30 (N)
Scorecard

Sunrisers Hyderabad; 115/8 (20 overs)	v	Kolkata Knight Riders; 119/4 (19.4 overs)
Kane Williamson 26 (21); Tim Southee 2/26 (4 overs); Varun Chakravarthy 2/26 (4 overs)		Shubman Gill 57 (51); Jason Holder 2/32 (4 overs)

Kolkata Knight Riders won by 6 wickets
Dubai International Cricket Stadium, Dubai
Umpires: Michael Gough (Eng) and Jayaraman Madanagopal (Ind)
Player of the match: Shubman Gill (Kolkata Knight Riders)

- Sunrisers Hyderabad won the toss and elected to bat.

Match 54
7 October 2021
19:30 (N)
Scorecard

Kolkata Knight Riders; 171/4 (20 overs)	v	Rajasthan Royals; 85 (16.1 overs)
Shubman Gill 56 (44); Rahul Tewatia 1/11 (1 over)		Rahul Tewatia 44 (36); Shivam Mavi 4/21 (3.1 overs)

Kolkata Knight Riders won by 86 runs
Sharjah Cricket Stadium, Sharjah
Umpires: Michael Gough (Eng) and Saiyed Khalid (Ind)
Player of the match: Shivam Mavi (Kolkata Knight Riders)

- Rajasthan Royals won the toss and elected to field.
- Punjab Kings and Rajasthan Royals were eliminated as a result of this match.

== Playoffs ==
Eliminator

11 October 2021
19:30 (N)
Scorecard

Royal Challengers Bangalore; 138/7 (20 overs)	v	Kolkata Knight Riders; 139/6 (19.4 overs)
Virat Kohli 39 (33); Sunil Narine 4/21 (4 overs)		Shubman Gill 29 (18); Yuzvendra Chahal 2/16 (4 overs)

Kolkata Knight Riders won by 4 wickets
Sharjah Cricket Stadium, Sharjah
Umpires: Chris Gaffaney (NZ) and Virender Sharma (Ind)
Player of the match: Sunil Narine (Kolkata Knight Riders)

- Royal Challengers Bangalore won the toss and elected to bat.

Qualifier 2

13 October 2021
19:30 (N)
Scorecard

Delhi Capitals; 135/5 (20 overs)	v	Kolkata Knight Riders; 136/7 (19.5 overs)
Shikhar Dhawan 36 (39); Varun Chakaravarthy 2/26 (4 overs)		Venkatesh Iyer 55 (41); Kagiso Rabada 2/23 (4 overs)

Kolkata Knight Riders won by 3 wickets
Sharjah Cricket Stadium, Sharjah
Umpires: K. N. Ananthapadmanabhan (Ind) and Michael Gough (Eng)
Player of the match: Venkatesh Iyer (Kolkata Knight Riders)

- Kolkata Knight Riders won the toss and elected to field.

Final

15 October 2021
19:30 (N)
Scorecard

Chennai Super Kings; 192/3 (20 overs)	v	Kolkata Knight Riders; 165/9 (20 overs)
Faf du Plessis 86 (59); Sunil Narine 2/26 (4 overs)		Shubman Gill 51 (43); Shardul Thakur 3/38 (4 overs)

Chennai Super Kings won by 27 runs
Dubai International Cricket Stadium, Dubai
Umpires: Richard Illingworth (Eng) and Nitin Menon (Ind)
Player of the match: Faf du Plessis (Chennai Super Kings)

- Kolkata Knight Riders won the toss and elected to field.

== Statistics ==
=== Most runs ===
No.	Name	Match	Inns	NO	Runs	HS	Ave.	BF	SR	100s	50s	0s	4s	6s
1	Shubman Gill	17	17	0	478	94	45.11	402	118.90	0	2	0	39	11
2	Rahul Tripathi	17	16	2	397	74*	28.35	283	140.28	0	2	0	41	11
3	Nitish Rana	17	16	3	383	80	29.46	314	121.97	0	2	2	34	17
4	Venkatesh Iyer	10	10	1	370	67	41.11	288	128.47	0	4	0	37	14
5	Dinesh Karthik	17	15	5	223	40	22.30	170	131.17	0	0	1	22	7
6	Andre Russell	10	9	2	183	54	26.14	120	152.50	0	1	0	14	14
7	Eoin Morgan	17	16	4	133	47*	11.08	139	95.68	0	0	4	8	6
8	Pat Cummins	7	5	2	93	66*	31.00	56	166.07	0	1	1	5	8
9	Sunil Narine	14	10	2	62	26	7.75	47	113.91	0	0	3	3	5
10	Shakib Al Hasan	8	6	1	47	26	9.40	48	97.91	0	0	2	3	1
11	Shivam Mavi	9	2	0	25	20	12.50	20	125.00	0	0	0	2	2

- Source: ESPNcricinfo

=== Most wickets ===
No.	Name	Match	Inns	Overs	Maidens	Runs	Wickets	BBI	Avg.	Econ.	SR	4W	5W
1	Varun Chakravarthy	17	17	68.0	0	448	18	3/13	24.88	6.58	22.66	0	0
2	Sunil Narine	14	14	56.0	0	361	16	4/21	22.56	6.44	21.0	1	0
3	Lockie Ferguson	8	8	30.0	0	224	13	3/18	17.23	7.46	13.84	0	0
4	Prasidh Krishna	10	10	38.3	0	351	12	3/30	29.25	9.11	19.25	0	0
5	Shivam Mavi	9	9	32.1	0	233	11	4/21	21.18	7.24	17.54	1	0
6	Andre Russell	10	8	19.0	0	188	11	5/15	17.09	9.89	10.36	0	1
7	Pat Cummins	7	7	26.5	0	237	9	3/24	26.33	8.83	17.88	0	0
8	Shakib Al Hasan	8	8	26.0	0	187	4	1/1	46.75	7.19	39.0	0	0
9	Venkatesh Iyer	10	4	8.3	0	69	3	2/29	20.00	8.11	17.00	0	0
10	Tim Southee	3	3	12.0	0	95	3	2/26	31.66	7.91	24.00	0	0

- Source: ESPNcricinfo

== Player of the match awards ==
No.	Date	Player	Opponent	Result	Contribution	Ref.
1	11 April 2021	Nitish Rana	Sunrisers Hyderabad	Won by 10 runs	80 (56)	
2	26 April 2021	Eoin Morgan	Punjab Kings	Won by 5 Wickets	47* (40)	
3	20 September 2021	Varun Chakravarthy	Royal Challengers Bangalore	Won by 9 Wickets	3/13 (4)	
4	23 September 2021	Sunil Narine	Mumbai Indians	Won by 7 Wickets	1/20 (4)	
5	28 September 2021	Sunil Narine	Delhi Capitals	Won by 3 Wickets	2/18 (4) and 21 (10)	
6	3 October 2021	Shubman Gill	Sunrisers Hyderabad	Won by 6 Wickets	57 (51)	
7	7 October 2021	Shivam Mavi	Rajasthan Royals	Won by 86 runs	4/21 (4 overs)	
8	11 October 2021: Eliminator	Sunil Narine	Royal Challengers Bangalore	Won by 4 wickets	4/21 (4 overs) and 26 (15)	
9	13 October 2021: Qualifier 2	Venkatesh Iyer	Delhi Capitals	Won by 3 wickets	55 (41)	
