= 2021 Sunrisers Hyderabad season =

Indian Premier League cricket team season

Sunrisers Hyderabad
2021 season
- Coach: Trevor Bayliss
- Captain: David Warner; Kane Williamson (Note: Kane Williamson replaced David Warner as the captain after six matches.); Manish Pandey (Note: Manish Pandey captained last match of the season with Warner, Williamson and Kumar rested for the match.)
- Ground(s): Rajiv Gandhi International Cricket Stadium, Hyderabad
- IPL: League stage (8th)
- Most runs: Manish Pandey (292)
- Most wickets: Rashid Khan (18)
- Most catches: Abdul Samad (8)
- Most wicket-keeping dismissals: Wriddhiman Saha (6)

The Sunrisers Hyderabad (often abbreviated as SRH) are a franchise cricket team based in Hyderabad, Telangana, which plays in the Indian Premier League (IPL). They were one of the eight teams to compete in the 2021 Indian Premier League, making their ninth appearance in all IPL tournaments. The team was coached by Trevor Bayliss with Brad Haddin as assistant coach, Muttiah Muralitharan as bowling coach and VVS Laxman as mentor.

They began the season with a loss against the Kolkata Knight Riders and failed to qualify for the playoffs finishing eighth at the end of the tournament.

== Background ==
On 15 December 2020, Tom Moody was appointed as the Director of Cricket for Sunrisers Hyderabad. He coached the Sunrisers since its inception in 2013 until the end of 2019 season. The Sunrisers won their only IPL title in 2016 under his charge.

== Player acquisition ==
The Sunrisers Hyderabad retained 22 players and released five players as they announced their retention list on 20 January 2021 ahead of the auction. They will enter into the auction with the remaining salary cap of ₹10.75 crore (US$1.3 million) to fill minimum of three domestic and one overseas players' slot.

The players' auction took place on 18 February 2021 in Chennai. The Sunrisers acquired services of two domestic players and an overseas player.

Retained players
David Warner, Manish Pandey, Kane Williamson, Jonny Bairstow, Wriddhiman Saha, Shreevats Goswami, Priyam Garg, Virat Singh, Rashid Khan, Vijay Shankar, Mohammad Nabi, Abhishek Sharma, Mitchell Marsh, Jason Holder, Abdul Samad, Thangarasu Natarajan, Bhuvneshwar Kumar, Shahbaz Nadeem, Khaleel Ahmed, Siddarth Kaul, Sandeep Sharma, Basil Thampi

Released players
Sanjay Yadav, Bavanaka Sandeep, Billy Stanlake, Fabian Allen, Prithvi Raj

Added players
Jagadeesha Suchith, Kedar Jadhav, Mujeeb Ur Rahman

Replacement players
Jason Roy, Sherfane Rutherford, Umran Malik

== Squad ==
- Players with international caps are listed in **bold**.
- **Year signed** denotes the season the player first played for the team

No.	Name	Nationality	Birth date	Batting style	Bowling style	Year signed	Salary	Notes
Batsmen
1	Abdul Samad	India	28 October 2001 (aged 19)	Right-handed	Right-arm leg break	2020	₹20 lakh (US$24,000)	
8	Virat Singh	India	8 December 1997 (aged 23)	Left-handed	Right-arm leg spin	2020	₹1.9 crore (US$220,000)	
11	Priyam Garg	India	30 November 2000 (aged 20)	Right-handed	Right-arm medium-fast	2020	₹1.9 crore (US$220,000)	
18	**Kedar Jadhav**	India	26 March 1985 (aged 36)	Right-handed	Right-arm off break	2021	₹2 crore (US$240,000)	
20	**Jason Roy**	England	21 July 1990 (aged 30)	Right-handed	Right-arm medium	2021	₹2 crore (US$240,000)	Overseas, Replacement for Marsh.
21	**Manish Pandey**	India	10 September 1989 (aged 31)	Right-handed		2018	₹11 crore (US$1.3 million)	
22	**Kane Williamson**	New Zealand	8 August 1990 (aged 30)	Right-handed	Right-arm off break	2015	₹3 crore (US$350,000)	Captain, Overseas
31	**David Warner**	Australia	27 October 1986 (aged 34)	Left-handed	Right-arm leg break	2014	₹12 crore (US$1.4 million)	Overseas
All-rounders
4	Abhishek Sharma	India	4 September 2000 (aged 20)	Left-handed	Left-arm orthodox	2019	₹55 lakh (US$65,000)	
5	**Mitchell Marsh**	Australia	20 October 1991 (aged 29)	Right-handed	Right-arm medium-fast	2020	₹2 crore (US$240,000)	Overseas. Pulled out on 31 March for personal reasons.
7	**Mohammad Nabi**	Afghanistan	1 January 1985 (aged 36)	Right-handed	Right-arm off break	2017	₹1 crore (US$120,000)	Overseas
59	**Vijay Shankar**	India	26 January 1991 (aged 30)	Right-handed	Right-arm medium-fast	2019	₹3.2 crore (US$380,000)	Isolated as primary contact for COVID-19.
98	**Jason Holder**	Barbados	5 November 1991 (aged 29)	Right-handed	Right-arm fast	2020	₹75 lakh (US$89,000)	Overseas
	**Sherfane Rutherford**	Guyana	15 August 1998 (aged 22)	Left-handed	Right-arm medium-fast	2021	₹75 lakh (US$89,000)	Overseas, Replacement for Bairstow. Pulled out on 23 September for personal reasons.
Wicket-keepers
6	**Wriddhiman Saha**	India	24 October 1984 (aged 36)	Right-handed		2018	₹1.2 crore (US$140,000)	
36	Shreevats Goswami	India	18 May 1989 (aged 31)	Left-handed		2018	₹1 crore (US$120,000)	
51	**Jonny Bairstow**	England	26 September 1989 (aged 31)	Right-handed		2019	₹2.2 crore (US$260,000)	Overseas. Pulled out on 11 September owing to bubble fatigue.
Bowlers
9	**Siddarth Kaul**	India	19 May 1990 (aged 30)	Right-handed	Right-arm medium-fast	2016	₹3.8 crore (US$450,000)	
15	**Bhuvneshwar Kumar**	India	5 February 1990 (aged 31)	Right-handed	Right-arm medium-fast	2014	₹8.5 crore (US$1.0 million)	
19	**Rashid Khan**	Afghanistan	20 September 1998 (aged 22)	Right-handed	Right-arm leg break	2017	₹9 crore (US$1.1 million)	Overseas
24	Umran Malik	India	22 November 1999 (aged 21)	Right-handed	Right-arm medium-fast	2021	₹10 lakh (US$12,000)	Short-term replacement for Natarajan.
25	**Khaleel Ahmed**	India	5 December 1997 (aged 23)	Right-handed	Left-arm medium-fast	2018	₹3 crore (US$350,000)	
30	Basil Thampi	India	11 September 1993 (aged 27)	Right-handed	Right-arm medium-fast	2018	₹95 lakh (US$110,000)	
44	**T. Natarajan**	India	4 April 1991 (aged 30)	Left-handed	Left-arm medium-fast	2018	₹40 lakh (US$47,000)	Pulled out on 22 April due to knee injury and returned for UAE leg. Tested positive for COVID-19 on 22 September.
45	Jagadeesha Suchith	India	16 January 1994 (aged 27)	Left-handed	Left-arm orthodox	2021	₹30 lakh (US$35,000)	
66	**Sandeep Sharma**	India	18 May 1993 (aged 27)	Right-handed	Right-arm medium-fast	2018	₹3 crore (US$350,000)	
77	**Mujeeb Ur Rahman**	Afghanistan	28 March 2001 (aged 20)	Right-handed	Right-arm off break	2021	₹1.5 crore (US$180,000)	Overseas
88	**Shahbaz Nadeem**	India	12 August 1989 (aged 31)	Right-handed	Left-arm orthodox	2019	₹3.2 crore (US$380,000)	

Last updated: 24 September 2021.
Source: IPLT20

== Administration and support staff ==
Position	Name
Owner	Kalanithi Maran (Sun Network)
CEO	K Shanmughan
Director of cricket	Tom Moody
Head coach	Trevor Bayliss
Assistant coach	Brad Haddin
Bowling coach	Muttiah Muralitharan
Fielding coach	Biju George
Physio	Theo Kapakoulakis
Physical trainer	Mario Villavarayan

== Kit manufacturers and sponsors ==
Kit manufacturers	Shirt sponsor (front)	Shirt sponsor (back)	Chest branding
TYKA Sports	JK Lakshmi Cement	Ralco Tyres	Kent RO Systems
Source :

T20 uniform

== Season overview ==
=== League stage ===
==== Standings ====
Pos	Team	Pld	W	L	NR	Pts	NRR	
1	Delhi Capitals (3rd)	14	10	4	0	20	0.481	Advanced to Qualifier 1
2	Chennai Super Kings (C)	14	9	5	0	18	0.455	Advanced to Qualifier 1
3	Royal Challengers Bangalore (4th)	14	9	5	0	18	−0.140	Advanced to the Eliminator
4	Kolkata Knight Riders (R)	14	7	7	0	14	0.587	Advanced to the Eliminator
5	Mumbai Indians	14	7	7	0	14	0.116	
6	Punjab Kings	14	6	8	0	12	−0.001	
7	Rajasthan Royals	14	5	9	0	10	−0.993	
8	Sunrisers Hyderabad	14	3	11	0	6	−0.545	

Source: ESPNcricinfo
(C) Champions; (R) Runners-up
The four top-ranked teams qualified for the playoffs.

==== Results by match ====
Match	1	2	3	4	5	6	7	8	9	10	11	12	13	14
Ground	H	H	A	A	H	A	A	A	H	H	H	A	A	H
Result	L	L	L	W	L	L	L	L	L	W	L	L	W	L
Position	7	7	8	5	7	8	8	8	8	8	8	8	8	8

Source: Fixtures
A = Away; H = Home; W = Win; L = Loss; NR = No Result

== Fixtures ==
=== League stage ===
11 April	Kolkata Knight Riders; 187/5 (20 overs)	v	Sunrisers Hyderabad (H); 177/6 (20 overs)	Kolkata Knight Riders won by 10 runs
19:30 (D/N) Match 1 Scorecard	Kolkata Knight Riders; 187/5 (20 overs)	v	Sunrisers Hyderabad (H); 177/6 (20 overs)	M. A. Chidambaram Stadium, Chennai; Umpires: K. N. Ananthapadmanabhan (Ind) and Nitin Menon (Ind); Player of the match: Nitish Rana (Kolkata Knight Riders)
19:30 (D/N) Match 1 Scorecard	Nitish Rana 80 (56); Rashid Khan 2/24 (4 overs)		Manish Pandey 61* (44); Prasidh Krishna 2/35 (4 overs)	M. A. Chidambaram Stadium, Chennai; Umpires: K. N. Ananthapadmanabhan (Ind) and Nitin Menon (Ind); Player of the match: Nitish Rana (Kolkata Knight Riders)
Sunrisers Hyderabad won the toss and elected to field.				M. A. Chidambaram Stadium, Chennai; Umpires: K. N. Ananthapadmanabhan (Ind) and Nitin Menon (Ind); Player of the match: Nitish Rana (Kolkata Knight Riders)

14 April	Royal Challengers Bangalore; 149/8	v	Sunrisers Hyderabad (H); 143/9	Royal Challengers Bangalore won by 6 runs
19:30 (D/N) Match 2 Scorecard	Royal Challengers Bangalore; 149/8	v	Sunrisers Hyderabad (H); 143/9	M. A. Chidambaram Stadium, Chennai; Umpires: Ulhas Gandhe (Ind) and Nitin Menon (Ind); Player of the match: Glenn Maxwell (Royal Challengers Bangalore)
19:30 (D/N) Match 2 Scorecard	Glenn Maxwell 59 (41); Jason Holder 3/30 (4 overs)		David Warner 54 (37); Shahbaz Ahmed 3/7 (2 overs)	M. A. Chidambaram Stadium, Chennai; Umpires: Ulhas Gandhe (Ind) and Nitin Menon (Ind); Player of the match: Glenn Maxwell (Royal Challengers Bangalore)
Sunrisers Hyderabad won the toss and elected to field.				M. A. Chidambaram Stadium, Chennai; Umpires: Ulhas Gandhe (Ind) and Nitin Menon (Ind); Player of the match: Glenn Maxwell (Royal Challengers Bangalore)

17 April	(H) Mumbai Indians; 150/5 (20 overs)	v	Sunrisers Hyderabad; 137 (19.4 overs)	Mumbai Indians won by 13 runs
19:30 (D/N) Match 3 Scorecard	(H) Mumbai Indians; 150/5 (20 overs)	v	Sunrisers Hyderabad; 137 (19.4 overs)	M. A. Chidambaram Stadium, Chennai; Umpires: Chris Gaffaney (NZ) and Krishnamachari Srinivasan (Ind); Player of the match: Kieron Pollard (Mumbai Indians)
19:30 (D/N) Match 3 Scorecard	Quinton de Kock 40 (39); Vijay Shankar 2/19 (3 overs)		Jonny Bairstow 43 (22); Rahul Chahar 3/19 (4 overs)	M. A. Chidambaram Stadium, Chennai; Umpires: Chris Gaffaney (NZ) and Krishnamachari Srinivasan (Ind); Player of the match: Kieron Pollard (Mumbai Indians)
Mumbai Indians won the toss and elected to bat.				M. A. Chidambaram Stadium, Chennai; Umpires: Chris Gaffaney (NZ) and Krishnamachari Srinivasan (Ind); Player of the match: Kieron Pollard (Mumbai Indians)

21 April	(H) Punjab Kings; 120 (19.4 overs)	v	Sunrisers Hyderabad; 121/1 (18.4 overs)	Sunrisers Hyderabad won by 9 wickets
15:30 (D/N) Match 4 Scorecard	(H) Punjab Kings; 120 (19.4 overs)	v	Sunrisers Hyderabad; 121/1 (18.4 overs)	M. A. Chidambaram Stadium, Chennai; Umpires: Nitin Menon (Ind) and Krishnamachari Srinivasan (Ind); Player of the match: Jonny Bairstow (Sunrisers Hyderabad)
15:30 (D/N) Match 4 Scorecard	Shahrukh Khan 22 (17); Khaleel Ahmed 3/21 (4 overs)		Jonny Bairstow 63* (56); Fabian Allen 1/22 (4 overs)	M. A. Chidambaram Stadium, Chennai; Umpires: Nitin Menon (Ind) and Krishnamachari Srinivasan (Ind); Player of the match: Jonny Bairstow (Sunrisers Hyderabad)
Punjab Kings won the toss and elected to bat.				M. A. Chidambaram Stadium, Chennai; Umpires: Nitin Menon (Ind) and Krishnamachari Srinivasan (Ind); Player of the match: Jonny Bairstow (Sunrisers Hyderabad)

25 April	Delhi Capitals; 159/4 (20 overs)	v	(H) Sunrisers Hyderabad; 159/7 (20 overs)	Match tied (Delhi Capitals won the Super Over)
19:30 (D/N) Match 5 Scorecard	Delhi Capitals; 159/4 (20 overs)	v	(H) Sunrisers Hyderabad; 159/7 (20 overs)	M. A. Chidambaram Stadium, Chennai; Umpires: K. N. Ananthapadmanabhan (Ind) and Chris Gaffaney (NZ); Player of the match: Prithvi Shaw (Delhi Capitals)
19:30 (D/N) Match 5 Scorecard	Prithvi Shaw 53 (39); Siddarth Kaul 2/31 (4 overs)		Kane Williamson 66* (51); Avesh Khan 3/34 (4 overs)	M. A. Chidambaram Stadium, Chennai; Umpires: K. N. Ananthapadmanabhan (Ind) and Chris Gaffaney (NZ); Player of the match: Prithvi Shaw (Delhi Capitals)
Delhi Capitals won the toss and elected to bat.; Super Over: Sunrisers Hyderabad 7/0 (1 over), Delhi Capitals 8/0 (1 over)				M. A. Chidambaram Stadium, Chennai; Umpires: K. N. Ananthapadmanabhan (Ind) and Chris Gaffaney (NZ); Player of the match: Prithvi Shaw (Delhi Capitals)

28 April	Sunrisers Hyderabad; 171/3 (20 overs)	v	(H) Chennai Super Kings; 173/3 (18.3 overs)	Chennai Super Kings won by 7 wickets
19:30 (D/N) Match 6 Scorecard	Sunrisers Hyderabad; 171/3 (20 overs)	v	(H) Chennai Super Kings; 173/3 (18.3 overs)	Arun Jaitley Stadium, Delhi; Umpires: C. K. Nandan (Ind) and Chettithody Shamshuddin (Ind); Player of the match: Ruturaj Gaikwad (Chennai Super Kings)
19:30 (D/N) Match 6 Scorecard	Manish Pandey 61 (46); Lungi Ngidi 2/35 (4 overs)		Ruturaj Gaikwad 75 (46); Rashid Khan 3/36 (4 overs)	Arun Jaitley Stadium, Delhi; Umpires: C. K. Nandan (Ind) and Chettithody Shamshuddin (Ind); Player of the match: Ruturaj Gaikwad (Chennai Super Kings)
Sunrisers Hyderabad won the toss and elected to bat.				Arun Jaitley Stadium, Delhi; Umpires: C. K. Nandan (Ind) and Chettithody Shamshuddin (Ind); Player of the match: Ruturaj Gaikwad (Chennai Super Kings)

2 May	(H) Rajasthan Royals; 220/3 (20 overs)	v	Sunrisers Hyderabad; 165/8 (20 overs)	Rajasthan Royals won by 55 runs
15:30 (D/N) Match 7 Scorecard	(H) Rajasthan Royals; 220/3 (20 overs)	v	Sunrisers Hyderabad; 165/8 (20 overs)	Arun Jaitley Stadium, Delhi; Umpires: Chris Gaffaney (NZ) and Chettithody Shamshuddin (Ind); Player of the match: Jos Buttler (Rajasthan Royals)
15:30 (D/N) Match 7 Scorecard	Jos Buttler 124 (64); Rashid Khan 1/24 (4 overs)		Manish Pandey 31 (20); Mustafizur Rahman 3/20 (4 overs)	Arun Jaitley Stadium, Delhi; Umpires: Chris Gaffaney (NZ) and Chettithody Shamshuddin (Ind); Player of the match: Jos Buttler (Rajasthan Royals)
Sunrisers Hyderabad won the toss and elected to field.				Arun Jaitley Stadium, Delhi; Umpires: Chris Gaffaney (NZ) and Chettithody Shamshuddin (Ind); Player of the match: Jos Buttler (Rajasthan Royals)

22 September	Sunrisers Hyderabad; 134/9 (20 overs)	v	Delhi Capitals (H); 139/2 (17.5 overs)	Delhi Capitals won by 8 wickets
19:30 (D/N) Match 8 Scorecard	Sunrisers Hyderabad; 134/9 (20 overs)	v	Delhi Capitals (H); 139/2 (17.5 overs)	Dubai International Cricket Stadium, Dubai; Umpires: K. N. Ananthapadmanabhan (Ind) and Richard Illingworth (Eng); Player of the match: Anrich Nortje (Delhi Capitals)
19:30 (D/N) Match 8 Scorecard	Abdul Samad 28 (21); Kagiso Rabada 3/37 (4 overs)		Shreyas Iyer 47* (41); Rashid Khan 1/26 (4 overs)	Dubai International Cricket Stadium, Dubai; Umpires: K. N. Ananthapadmanabhan (Ind) and Richard Illingworth (Eng); Player of the match: Anrich Nortje (Delhi Capitals)
Sunrisers Hyderabad won the toss and elected to bat.				Dubai International Cricket Stadium, Dubai; Umpires: K. N. Ananthapadmanabhan (Ind) and Richard Illingworth (Eng); Player of the match: Anrich Nortje (Delhi Capitals)

25 September	Punjab Kings; 125/7 (20 overs)	v	(H) Sunrisers Hyderabad; 120/7 (20 overs)	Punjab Kings won by 5 runs
19:30 (D/N) Match 9 Scorecard	Punjab Kings; 125/7 (20 overs)	v	(H) Sunrisers Hyderabad; 120/7 (20 overs)	Sharjah Cricket Stadium, Sharjah; Umpires: Yeshwant Barde (Ind) and Richard Illingworth (Eng); Player of the match: Jason Holder (Sunrisers Hyderabad)
19:30 (D/N) Match 9 Scorecard	Aiden Markram 27 (32); Jason Holder 3/19 (4 overs)		Jason Holder 47* (29); Ravi Bishnoi 3/24 (4 overs)	Sharjah Cricket Stadium, Sharjah; Umpires: Yeshwant Barde (Ind) and Richard Illingworth (Eng); Player of the match: Jason Holder (Sunrisers Hyderabad)
Sunrisers Hyderabad won the toss and elected to field.				Sharjah Cricket Stadium, Sharjah; Umpires: Yeshwant Barde (Ind) and Richard Illingworth (Eng); Player of the match: Jason Holder (Sunrisers Hyderabad)

27 September	Rajasthan Royals; 164/5 (20 overs)	v	Sunrisers Hyderabad (H); 167/3 (18.3 overs)	Sunrisers Hyderabad won by 7 wickets
19:30 (D/N) Match 10 Scorecard	Rajasthan Royals; 164/5 (20 overs)	v	Sunrisers Hyderabad (H); 167/3 (18.3 overs)	Dubai International Cricket Stadium, Dubai; Umpires: K. N. Ananthapadmanabhan (Ind) and Navdeep Singh (Ind); Player of the match: Jason Roy (Sunrisers Hyderabad)
19:30 (D/N) Match 10 Scorecard	Sanju Samson 82* (57); Siddarth Kaul 2/36 (4 overs)		Jason Roy 60 (42); Mahipal Lomror 1/22 (3 overs)	Dubai International Cricket Stadium, Dubai; Umpires: K. N. Ananthapadmanabhan (Ind) and Navdeep Singh (Ind); Player of the match: Jason Roy (Sunrisers Hyderabad)
Rajasthan Royals won the toss and elected to bat.				Dubai International Cricket Stadium, Dubai; Umpires: K. N. Ananthapadmanabhan (Ind) and Navdeep Singh (Ind); Player of the match: Jason Roy (Sunrisers Hyderabad)

30 September	(H) Sunrisers Hyderabad; 134/7 (20 overs)	v	Chennai Super Kings; 139/4 (19.4 overs)	Chennai Super Kings won by 6 wickets
19:30 (D/N) Match 11 Scorecard	(H) Sunrisers Hyderabad; 134/7 (20 overs)	v	Chennai Super Kings; 139/4 (19.4 overs)	Sharjah Cricket Stadium, Sharjah; Umpires: Yeshwant Barde (Ind) and Nitin Menon (Ind); Player of the match: Josh Hazlewood (Chennai Super Kings)
19:30 (D/N) Match 11 Scorecard	Wriddhiman Saha 44 (46); Josh Hazlewood 3/24 (4 overs)		Ruturaj Gaikwad 45 (38); Jason Holder 3/27 (4 overs)	Sharjah Cricket Stadium, Sharjah; Umpires: Yeshwant Barde (Ind) and Nitin Menon (Ind); Player of the match: Josh Hazlewood (Chennai Super Kings)
Chennai Super Kings won the toss and elected to field.				Sharjah Cricket Stadium, Sharjah; Umpires: Yeshwant Barde (Ind) and Nitin Menon (Ind); Player of the match: Josh Hazlewood (Chennai Super Kings)

3 October	Sunrisers Hyderabad; 115/8 (20 overs)	v	(H) Kolkata Knight Riders; 119/4 (19.4 overs)	Kolkata Knight Riders won by 6 wickets
19:30 (D/N) Match 12 Scorecard	Sunrisers Hyderabad; 115/8 (20 overs)	v	(H) Kolkata Knight Riders; 119/4 (19.4 overs)	Dubai International Cricket Stadium, Dubai; Umpires: Michael Gough (Eng) and Jayaraman Madanagopal (Ind); Player of the match: Shubman Gill (Kolkata Knight Riders)
19:30 (D/N) Match 12 Scorecard	Kane Williamson 26 (21); Varun Chakravarthy 2/26 (4 overs)		Shubman Gill 57 (51); Jason Holder 2/32 (4 overs)	Dubai International Cricket Stadium, Dubai; Umpires: Michael Gough (Eng) and Jayaraman Madanagopal (Ind); Player of the match: Shubman Gill (Kolkata Knight Riders)
Sunrisers Hyderabad won the toss and elected to bat.				Dubai International Cricket Stadium, Dubai; Umpires: Michael Gough (Eng) and Jayaraman Madanagopal (Ind); Player of the match: Shubman Gill (Kolkata Knight Riders)

6 October	(H) Royal Challengers Bangalore; 141/7 (20 overs)	v	Sunrisers Hyderabad; 137/6 (20 overs)	Sunrisers Hyderabad won by 4 runs
19:30 (D/N) Match 13 Scorecard	(H) Royal Challengers Bangalore; 141/7 (20 overs)	v	Sunrisers Hyderabad; 137/6 (20 overs)	Sharjah Cricket Stadium, Sharjah; Umpires: Sundaram Ravi (Ind) and Ulhas Gandhe (Ind); Player of the match: Kane Williamson (Sunrisers Hyderabad)
19:30 (D/N) Match 13 Scorecard	Jason Roy 44 (38); Harshal Patel 3/33 (4 overs)		Devdutt Padikkal 41 (52); Umran Malik 1/21 (4 overs)	Sharjah Cricket Stadium, Sharjah; Umpires: Sundaram Ravi (Ind) and Ulhas Gandhe (Ind); Player of the match: Kane Williamson (Sunrisers Hyderabad)
Royal Challengers Bangalore won the toss and elected to field.				Sharjah Cricket Stadium, Sharjah; Umpires: Sundaram Ravi (Ind) and Ulhas Gandhe (Ind); Player of the match: Kane Williamson (Sunrisers Hyderabad)

8 October	(H) Sunrisers Hyderabad; 193/8 (20 overs)	v	Mumbai Indians; 235/9 (20 overs)	Mumbai Indians won by 42 runs
15:30 (D/N) Match 14 Scorecard	(H) Sunrisers Hyderabad; 193/8 (20 overs)	v	Mumbai Indians; 235/9 (20 overs)	Sheikh Zayed Cricket Stadium, Abu Dhabi; Umpires: Tapan Sharma (Ind) and Virender Sharma (Ind)
15:30 (D/N) Match 14 Scorecard	Ishan Kishan 84 (32); Jason Holder 4/52 (4 overs)		Manish Pandey 69* (41); James Neesham 2/28 (3 overs)	Sheikh Zayed Cricket Stadium, Abu Dhabi; Umpires: Tapan Sharma (Ind) and Virender Sharma (Ind)
Mumbai Indians won the toss and elected to bat.				Sheikh Zayed Cricket Stadium, Abu Dhabi; Umpires: Tapan Sharma (Ind) and Virender Sharma (Ind)

== Statistics ==
No.	Name	Mat	Runs	HS	Ave	SR	Wkts	BBI	Ave	Eco	Ct	St
1	Abdul Samad	11	111	28	12.33	127.58	1	1/9	9.00	9.00	8	–
4	Abhishek Sharma	8	98	33	16.33	130.66	4	2/4	16.00	6.40	2	–
6	Wriddhiman Saha	9	131	44	14.55	93.57	–	–	–	–	6	0
7	Mohammad Nabi	3	34	17	11.33	170.00	2	2/32	43.00	10.75	5	–
8	Virat Singh	3	15	11	7.50	57.69	–	–	–	–	2	–
9	Siddarth Kaul	8	8	7*	–	100.00	7	2/31	35.28	8.23	1	–
11	Priyam Garg	5	72	29	14.40	97.29	–	–	–	–	0	–
15	Bhuvneshwar Kumar	11	34	14*	34.00	113.33	6	1/16	55.83	7.97	0	–
18	Kedar Jadhav	6	55	19	13.75	105.76	–	–	–	–	2	–
19	Rashid Khan	14	83	22	10.37	120.28	18	3/36	20.83	6.69	2	–
20	Jason Roy	5	150	60	30.00	123.96	–	–	–	–	3	–
21	Manish Pandey	8	292	69*	48.66	123.72	–	–	–	–	5	–
22	Kane Williamson	10	266	66*	44.33	113.19	–	–	–	–	7	–
24	Umran Malik	3	–	–	–	–	2	1/21	48.00	8.00	0	–
25	Khaleel Ahmed	7	1	1	1.00	50.00	5	3/21	43.80	8.11	0	–
31	David Warner	8	195	57	24.37	107.73	–	–	–	–	2	–
44	T. Natarajan	2	0	0*	–	–	2	1/32	34.50	8.62	0	–
45	Jagadeesha Suchith	2	14	14*	–	233.33	0	–	–	9.42	1	–
51	Jonny Bairstow	7	248	63*	41.33	141.71	–	–	–	–	2	1
59	Vijay Shankar	7	58	28	11.60	111.53	3	2/19	33.33	9.09	3	–
66	Sandeep Sharma	7	8	8*	8.00	114.28	3	1/20	67.66	8.63	1	–
77	Mujeeb Ur Rahman	1	1	1*	–	100.00	2	2/29	14.50	7.25	0	–
88	Shahbaz Nadeem	1	0	0	0.00	0.00	1	1/36	36.00	9.00	1	–
98	Jason Holder	8	85	47*	14.16	118.05	16	4/52	15.43	7.75	2	–

Last updated: 13 October 2021.
Source: ESPNcricinfo

== Awards and achievements ==
=== Awards ===
Man of the Match

No.	Date	Player	Opponent	Venue	Result	Contribution	Ref.
1	21 April 2021	Jonny Bairstow	Punjab Kings	Chennai	Won by 9 wickets	63* (56)	
2	25 September 2021	Jason Holder	Punjab Kings	Sharjah	Lost by 5 runs	3/19 (4 overs) and 47* (29)	
3	27 September 2021	Jason Roy	Rajasthan Royals	Dubai	Won by 7 wickets	60 (42)	
4	6 October 2021	Kane Williamson	Royal Challengers Bangalore	Sharjah	Won by 4 runs	31 (29) and 2 catches	

=== Achievements ===
- Mohammad Nabi became the first player in the IPL history to take five catches in a single match.

== Reaction ==
Trevor Bayliss and Brad Haddin stepped down as the head-coach and assistant coach of the Sunrisers Hyderabad following the last-place finish. VVS Laxman stepped down as mentor to take the job as the Director of Cricket at the National Cricket Academy. On 23 December 2021, Tom Moody, predecessor to Bayliss, was announced as the head-coach of the Sunrisers Hyderabad for the 2022 Indian Premier League with Simon Katich appointed as the assistant-coach. Dale Steyn, Brian Lara and Hemang Badani were also appointed as pace-bowling, batting and fielding coaches.
