= 2021 Indian Premier League =

Cricket tournament

- Dates: 9 April – 15 October 2021
- Administrator: Board of Control for Cricket in India (BCCI)
- Cricket format: Twenty20
- Tournament format(s): Double round-robin and playoffs
- Hosts: India; United Arab Emirates
- Champions: Chennai Super Kings (4th title)
- Runners-up: Kolkata Knight Riders
- Participants: 8
- Matches: 60
- Most valuable player: Harshal Patel (RCB)
- Most runs: Ruturaj Gaikwad (CSK) (635)
- Most wickets: Harshal Patel (RCB) (32)
- Official website: www.iplt20.com

The 2021 Indian Premier League (also known as IPL 14, or for sponsorship reasons, VIVO IPL 2021) was the fourteenth season of the Indian Premier League (IPL), a professional Twenty20 cricket league established by the Board of Control for Cricket in India (BCCI) in 2007.

Mumbai Indians were the two-time defending champions. Ahead of the tournament, Kings XI Punjab were renamed as the Punjab Kings. In March 2021, the BCCI announced the fixtures for the tournament. The tournament started on 9 April. However, on 4 May, the tournament was suspended indefinitely, after a rise in COVID-19 cases within the bio bubbles of some teams. At the time of the suspension, 31 of the scheduled 60 matches were still left to be played. On 29 May 2021, the BCCI announced that the remaining matches of the tournament would be played in the United Arab Emirates in September and October 2021. The schedule for the remainder of the tournament was released in July 2021.

In the final, Chennai Super Kings beat Kolkata Knight Riders to win their fourth IPL title. Ruturaj Gaikwad scored the most runs in the tournament, while Harshal Patel took the most wickets and also won the Most Valuable Player award.

== Background ==
Mumbai Indians were the two-time defending champions, having won both the 2019 and the 2020 seasons. Although early reports suggested the addition of two more teams in the season, the Board of Control for Cricket in India (BCCI) announced in their 89th AGM that the inclusion of two new teams would be delayed until the 2022 season. The Kings XI Punjab were renamed to Punjab Kings ahead of the tournament.

On 30 January 2021, the BCCI announced that they expected to host the tournament in India, and that the UAE, which had hosted the previous season due to the COVID-19 pandemic, was not being considered as a backup venue. On the day of the auction, the BCCI also confirmed that Vivo had returned as the title sponsor, after it had pulled out of the previous tournament. As of late February, the BCCI was considering hosting the tournament in a few shortlisted cities: Kolkata, Delhi, Bangalore, Ahmedabad and Chennai, with Mumbai as an additional option.

On 7 March 2021, the BCCI announced the full schedule for the season. Six venues, including all the five shortlisted venues and the additional option, Mumbai, were scheduled to host matches. To avoid home advantage, no team was scheduled to play at their home venue. The season was scheduled to start from 9 April, with the final taking place on 30 May at the Narendra Modi Stadium in Ahmedabad. The BCCI also confirmed that the tournament would begin behind closed doors, and a call on letting spectators in would be taken at a later stage. After the sudden rise in COVID-19 cases in India, Hyderabad was also added as a backup venue, though no matches were played there.

== Personnel changes ==
The released players were announced on 20 January 2021. Steve Smith, Aaron Finch and Glenn Maxwell were the prominent names among the released players. Piyush Chawla, the costliest Indian player at the 2020 auction, was also released.

The players' auction was held on 18 February 2021 in Chennai. Chris Morris was the most expensive player, purchased by the Rajasthan Royals for ₹16.25 crore (US$1.7 million). The most expensive Indian player sold was Krishnappa Gowtham, who was purchased by the Chennai Super Kings for ₹9.25 crore (US$960,000).

== COVID-19 impact ==
Due to the worsening COVID-19 situation in India, several players, including Liam Livingstone and Adam Zampa, withdrew from the tournament. After the Chennai leg of the tournament, Ravichandran Ashwin left the Delhi Capitals bio-bubble to "support [his] family" during the pandemic. On 3 May 2021, the scheduled match between Kolkata Knight Riders and Royal Challengers Bangalore was postponed after two Kolkata players tested positive for COVID-19. On the same day, three members of the Chennai Super Kings camp – including their bowling coach Lakshmipathy Balaji and CEO Kasi Viswanathan, tested positive. Later, the entire Delhi Capitals team was put into quarantine. Mumbai Indians and Sunrisers Hyderabad skipped their practice sessions ahead of their match on 4 May. As a result, the BCCI looked at hosting the remaining fixtures of the tournament in Mumbai.

However, on 4 May 2021, the Chennai Super Kings versus Rajasthan Royals match, scheduled for the following day, was also postponed due to the Chennai players being in quarantine. Later the same day, Hyderabad's Wriddhiman Saha and Delhi's Amit Mishra tested positive for the virus. On 4 May, the season was suspended indefinitely. On 5 May 2021, Michael Hussey, the batting coach of Chennai, became the first overseas individual to test positive. Tim Seifert and Prasidh Krishna of Kolkata tested positive as well.

On 6 May 2021, a group of English counties made an offer to host the remaining matches of the tournament in England in September 2021. But Sourav Ganguly, the president of the BCCI, ruled out the possibility of the tournament being completed in England or India, citing difficulties around quarantine rules. The BCCI were looking to play the remaining matches in September and October 2021, a plan that was confirmed on 25 July. It was then announced that the remainder of the tournament would take place in the UAE. The second half started on 19 September, with the final to be held on 15 October in Dubai. After the relocation to the UAE, the organisers were looking to allow at least 50% capacity of vaccinated audience in the stadium, if permitted by the local government. Four days before the restart, spectators who followed COVID-19 protocols were allowed in.

== Venues ==
Matches during the first stage of the competition were played in Delhi, Ahmedabad, Mumbai and Chennai. Eden Gardens in Kolkata and the M. Chinnaswamy Stadium in Bangalore were also scheduled to host matches, but these were relocated.

India
Delhi	Ahmedabad	Mumbai	Chennai
Arun Jaitley Stadium	Narendra Modi Stadium	Wankhede Stadium	M. A. Chidambaram Stadium
Capacity: 41,000	Capacity: 132,000	Capacity: 33,000	Capacity: 39,000
2021 Indian Premier League is located in India

After the tournament was shifted to the UAE, matches were held in Dubai, Sharjah, and Abu Dhabi.

United Arab Emirates
Dubai	Sharjah	Abu Dhabi
Dubai International Cricket Stadium	Sharjah Cricket Stadium	Sheikh Zayed Cricket Stadium
Capacity: 25,000	Capacity: 16,000	Capacity: 20,000
2021 Indian Premier League is located in United Arab Emirates

== Teams and standings ==
=== Points table ===
Each team received two points for a victory, one each for a no-result match, and none for a loss. The teams were ranked based on the number of points. If it was equal, the net run rate would determine the rankings.

Pos	Team	Pld	W	L	NR	Pts	NRR	
1	Delhi Capitals (3rd)	14	10	4	0	20	0.481	Advanced to Qualifier 1
2	Chennai Super Kings (C)	14	9	5	0	18	0.455	Advanced to Qualifier 1
3	Royal Challengers Bangalore (4th)	14	9	5	0	18	−0.140	Advanced to the Eliminator
4	Kolkata Knight Riders (R)	14	7	7	0	14	0.587	Advanced to the Eliminator
5	Mumbai Indians	14	7	7	0	14	0.116	
6	Punjab Kings	14	6	8	0	12	−0.001	
7	Rajasthan Royals	14	5	9	0	10	−0.993	
8	Sunrisers Hyderabad	14	3	11	0	6	−0.545	

Source: ESPNcricinfo
(C) Champions; (R) Runners-up
The four top-ranked teams qualified for the playoffs.

=== Match summary ===
Team	Group matches														Playoffs			
Team	1	2	3	4	5	6	7	8	9	10	11	12	13	14	Q1	E	Q2	F
Chennai Super Kings	0	2	4	6	8	10	10	12	14	16	18	18	18	18	W			W
Delhi Capitals	2	2	4	6	8	8	10	12	14	16	16	18	20	20	L		L	
Kolkata Knight Riders	2	2	2	2	2	4	4	6	8	8	10	10	12	14		W	W	L
Mumbai Indians	0	2	4	4	4	6	8	8	8	8	10	10	12	14				
Punjab Kings	2	2	2	2	4	4	6	6	6	8	8	10	10	12				
Rajasthan Royals	0	2	2	2	4	4	6	8	8	8	8	10	10	10				
Royal Challengers Bengaluru	2	4	6	8	8	10	10	10	10	12	14	16	16	18		L		
Sunrisers Hyderabad	0	0	0	2	2	2	2	2	2	4	4	4	6	6				

Win	Loss	No result

- Note: The total points at the end of each group match are listed.
- Note: Click on the points (group matches) or W/L (playoffs) to see the match summary.

Visitor team →	CSK	DC	KKR	MI	PBKS	RR	RCB	SRH
Home team ↓	CSK	DC	KKR	MI	PBKS	RR	RCB	SRH
Chennai Super Kings		Delhi; 7 wickets	Chennai; 2 wickets	Chennai; 20 runs	Punjab; 6 wickets	Chennai; 45 runs	Chennai; 69 runs	Chennai; 7 wickets
Delhi Capitals	Delhi; 3 wickets		Delhi; 7 wickets	Delhi; 6 wickets	Delhi; 6 wickets	Delhi; 33 runs	Bengaluru; 1 run	Delhi; 8 wickets
Kolkata Knight Riders	Chennai; 18 runs	Kolkata; 3 wickets		Mumbai; 10 runs	Punjab; 5 wickets	Kolkata; 86 runs	Kolkata; 9 wickets	Kolkata; 6 wickets
Mumbai Indians	Mumbai; 4 wickets	Delhi; 4 wickets	Kolkata; 7 wickets		Mumbai; 6 wickets	Mumbai; 7 wickets	Bengaluru; 2 wickets	Mumbai; 13 runs
Punjab Kings	Chennai; 6 wickets	Delhi; 7 wickets	Kolkata; 5 wickets	Punjab; 9 wickets		Rajasthan; 2 runs	Punjab; 34 runs	Hyderabad; 9 wickets
Rajasthan Royals	Rajasthan; 7 wickets	Rajasthan; 3 wickets	Rajasthan; 6 wickets	Mumbai; 8 wickets	Punjab; 4 runs		Bengaluru; 7 wickets	Rajasthan; 55 runs
Royal Challengers Bengaluru	Chennai; 6 wickets	Bengaluru; 7 wickets	Bengaluru; 38 runs	Bengaluru; 54 runs	Bengaluru; 6 runs	Bengaluru; 10 wickets		Hyderabad; 4 runs
Sunrisers Hyderabad	Chennai; 6 wickets	Delhi; Super Over	Kolkata; 10 runs	Mumbai; 42 runs	Punjab; 5 runs	Hyderabad; 7 wickets	Bengaluru; 6 runs	

Home team won	Visitor team won

- Note: Results listed are according to the home (horizontal) and visitor (vertical) teams.
- Note: Click on a result to see a summary of the match.

== League stage ==
The schedule for the league stages was published on the official IPL website on 7 March, and the schedule of the postponed matches to be held in the UAE was released on 25 July. The final two games of the league stage were played concurrently for the first time in the IPL history, as decided in the IPL Governing Council meeting on 28 September. The league follows the double round-robin format, where every team plays each other twice, and the top four teams advance to the playoffs. There were no home and away games, and no team played at their home ground. Rules and regulations dictated by the International Cricket Council were followed. If both teams score the same number of runs, a super over would follow.

=== Matches ===
==== India ====
Match 1
9 April 2021
19:30 (N)
Scorecard

Mumbai Indians; 159/9 (20 overs)	v	Royal Challengers Bangalore; 160/8 (20 overs)
Chris Lynn 49 (35); Harshal Patel 5/27 (4 overs)		AB de Villiers 48 (27); Jasprit Bumrah 2/26 (4 overs)

Royal Challengers Bangalore won by 2 wickets
M. A. Chidambaram Stadium, Chennai
Umpires: K. N. Ananthapadmanabhan (Ind) and Nitin Menon (Ind)
Player of the match: Harshal Patel (Royal Challengers Bangalore)

- Royal Challengers Bangalore won the toss and elected to field.

Match 2
10 April 2021
19:30 (N)
Scorecard

Chennai Super Kings; 188/7 (20 overs)	v	Delhi Capitals; 190/3 (18.4 overs)
Suresh Raina 54 (36); Chris Woakes 2/18 (3 overs)		Shikhar Dhawan 85 (54); Shardul Thakur 2/53 (3.4 overs)

Delhi Capitals won by 7 wickets
Wankhede Stadium, Mumbai
Umpires: Anil Chaudhary (Ind) and Virender Sharma (Ind)
Player of the match: Shikhar Dhawan (Delhi Capitals)

- Delhi Capitals won the toss and elected to field.

Match 3
11 April 2021
19:30 (N)
Scorecard

Kolkata Knight Riders; 187/6 (20 overs)	v	Sunrisers Hyderabad; 177/5 (20 overs)
Nitish Rana 80 (56); Rashid Khan 2/24 (4 overs)		Manish Pandey 61* (44); Prasidh Krishna 2/35 (4 overs)

Kolkata Knight Riders won by 10 runs
M. A. Chidambaram Stadium, Chennai
Umpires: K. N. Ananthapadmanabhan (Ind) and Nitin Menon (Ind)
Player of the match: Nitish Rana (Kolkata Knight Riders)

- Sunrisers Hyderabad won the toss and elected to field.
- This was the 100th win in the IPL for Kolkata Knight Riders.

Match 4
12 April 2021
19:30 (N)
Scorecard

Punjab Kings; 221/6 (20 overs)	v	Rajasthan Royals; 217/7 (20 overs)
KL Rahul 91 (50); Chetan Sakariya 3/31 (4 overs)		Sanju Samson 119 (63); Arshdeep Singh 3/35 (4 overs)

Punjab Kings won by 4 runs
Wankhede Stadium, Mumbai
Umpires: Anil Chaudhary (Ind) and Sundaram Ravi (Ind)
Player of the match: Sanju Samson (Rajasthan Royals)

- Rajasthan Royals won the toss and elected to field.

Match 5
13 April 2021
19:30 (N)
Scorecard

Mumbai Indians; 152 (20 overs)	v	Kolkata Knight Riders; 142/7 (20 overs)
Suryakumar Yadav 56 (36); Andre Russell 5/15 (2 overs)		Nitish Rana 57 (47); Rahul Chahar 4/27 (4 overs)

Mumbai Indians won by 10 runs
M. A. Chidambaram Stadium, Chennai
Umpires: Chris Gaffaney (NZ) and Chettithody Shamshuddin (Ind)
Player of the match: Rahul Chahar (Mumbai Indians)

- Kolkata Knight Riders won the toss and elected to field.

Match 6
14 April 2021
19:30 (N)
Scorecard

Royal Challengers Bangalore; 149/8 (20 overs)	v	Sunrisers Hyderabad; 143/9 (20 overs)
Glenn Maxwell 59 (41); Jason Holder 3/30 (4 overs)		David Warner 54 (37); Shahbaz Ahmed 3/7 (2 overs)

Royal Challengers Bangalore won by 6 runs
M. A. Chidambaram Stadium, Chennai
Umpires: Ulhas Gandhe (Ind) and Nitin Menon (Ind)
Player of the match: Glenn Maxwell (Royal Challengers Bangalore)

- Sunrisers Hyderabad won the toss and elected to field.

Match 7
15 April 2021
19:30 (N)
Scorecard

Delhi Capitals; 147/8 (20 overs)	v	Rajasthan Royals; 150/7 (19.4 overs)
Rishabh Pant 51 (32); Jaydev Unadkat 3/15 (4 overs)		David Miller 62 (43); Avesh Khan 3/32 (4 overs)

Rajasthan Royals won by 3 wickets
Wankhede Stadium, Mumbai
Umpires: Sundaram Ravi (Ind) and Virender Sharma (Ind)
Player of the match: Jaydev Unadkat (Rajasthan Royals)

- Rajasthan Royals won the toss and elected to field.

Match 8
16 April 2021
19:30 (N)
Scorecard

Punjab Kings; 106/8 (20 overs)	v	Chennai Super Kings; 107/4 (15.4 overs)
Shahrukh Khan 47 (36); Deepak Chahar 4/13 (4 overs)		Moeen Ali 46 (31); Mohammed Shami 2/21 (4 overs)

Chennai Super Kings won by 6 wickets
Wankhede Stadium, Mumbai
Umpires: Anil Chaudhary (Ind) and Anil Dandekar (Ind)
Player of the match: Deepak Chahar (Chennai Super Kings)

- Chennai Super Kings won the toss and elected to field.

Match 9
17 April 2021
19:30 (N)
Scorecard

Mumbai Indians; 150/5 (20 overs)	v	Sunrisers Hyderabad; 137 (19.4 overs)
Quinton de Kock 40 (39); Vijay Shankar 2/19 (3 overs)		Jonny Bairstow 43 (22); Rahul Chahar 3/19 (4 overs)

Mumbai Indians won by 13 runs
M. A. Chidambaram Stadium, Chennai
Umpires: Chris Gaffaney (NZ) and Krishnamachari Srinivasan (Ind)
Player of the match: Kieron Pollard (Mumbai Indians)

- Mumbai Indians won the toss and elected to bat.

Match 10
18 April 2021
15:30 (D/N)
Scorecard

Royal Challengers Bangalore; 204/4 (20 overs)	v	Kolkata Knight Riders; 166/8 (20 overs)
Glenn Maxwell 78 (49); Varun Chakravarthy 2/39 (4 overs)		Andre Russell 31 (20); Kyle Jamieson 3/41 (3 overs)

Royal Challengers Bangalore won by 38 runs
M. A. Chidambaram Stadium, Chennai
Umpires: Nitin Menon (Ind) and Chettithody Shamshuddin (Ind)
Player of the match: AB de Villiers (Royal Challengers Bangalore)

- Royal Challengers Bangalore won the toss and elected to bat.

Match 11
18 April 2021
19:30 (N)
Scorecard

Punjab Kings; 195/4 (20 overs)	v	Delhi Capitals; 198/4 (18.2 overs)
Mayank Agarwal 69 (36); Lukman Meriwala 1/32 (3 overs)		Shikhar Dhawan 92 (49); Jhye Richardson 2/41 (4 overs)

Delhi Capitals won by 6 wickets
Wankhede Stadium, Mumbai
Umpires: Anil Chaudhary (Ind) and Paul Reiffel (Aus)
Player of the match: Shikhar Dhawan (Delhi Capitals)

- Delhi Capitals won the toss and elected to field.

Match 12
19 April 2021
19:30 (N)
Scorecard

Chennai Super Kings; 188/9 (20 overs)	v	Rajasthan Royals; 143/9 (20 overs)
Faf du Plessis 33 (17); Chetan Sakariya 3/36 (4 overs)		Jos Buttler 49 (35); Moeen Ali 3/7 (3 overs)

Chennai Super Kings won by 45 runs
Wankhede Stadium, Mumbai
Umpires: Paul Reiffel (Aus) and Virender Sharma (Ind)
Player of the match: Moeen Ali (Chennai Super Kings)

- Rajasthan Royals won the toss and elected to field.
- MS Dhoni became the first player to play 200 matches as a captain in the IPL.

Match 13
20 April 2021
19:30 (N)
Scorecard

Mumbai Indians; 137/9 (20 overs)	v	Delhi Capitals; 138/4 (19.1 overs)
Rohit Sharma 44 (30); Amit Mishra 4/24 (4 overs)		Shikhar Dhawan 45 (42); Kieron Pollard 1/9 (1.1 overs)

Delhi Capitals won by 6 wickets
M. A. Chidambaram Stadium, Chennai
Umpires: Chris Gaffaney (NZ) and Chettithody Shamshuddin (Ind)
Player of the match: Amit Mishra (Delhi Capitals)

- Mumbai Indians won the toss and elected to bat.

Match 14
21 April 2021
15:30 (D/N)
Scorecard

Punjab Kings; 120 (19.4 overs)	v	Sunrisers Hyderabad; 121/1 (18.4 overs)
Shahrukh Khan 22 (17); Khaleel Ahmed 3/21 (4 overs)		Jonny Bairstow 63* (56); Fabian Allen 1/22 (4 overs)

Sunrisers Hyderabad won by 9 wickets
M. A. Chidambaram Stadium, Chennai
Umpires: Nitin Menon (Ind) and Krishnamachari Srinivasan (Ind)
Player of the match: Jonny Bairstow (Sunrisers Hyderabad)

- Punjab Kings won the toss and elected to bat.

Match 15
21 April 2021
19:30 (N)
Scorecard

Chennai Super Kings; 220/3 (20 overs)	v	Kolkata Knight Riders; 202 (19.1 overs)
Faf du Plessis 95* (60); Andre Russell 1/27 (2 overs)		Pat Cummins 66* (34); Deepak Chahar 4/29 (4 overs)

Chennai Super Kings won by 18 runs
Wankhede Stadium, Mumbai
Umpires: Anil Dandekar (Ind) and Paul Reiffel (Aus)
Player of the match: Faf du Plessis (Chennai Super Kings)

- Kolkata Knight Riders won the toss and elected to field.

Match 16
22 April 2021
19:30 (N)
Scorecard

Rajasthan Royals; 177/9 (20 overs)	v	Royal Challengers Bangalore; 181/0 (16.3 overs)
Shivam Dube 46 (32); Mohammed Siraj 3/27 (4 overs)		Devdutt Padikkal 101* (52)

Royal Challengers Bangalore won by 10 wickets
Wankhede Stadium, Mumbai
Umpires: Jayaraman Madanagopal (Ind) and Sundaram Ravi (Ind)
Player of the match: Devdutt Padikkal (Royal Challengers Bangalore)

- Royal Challengers Bangalore won the toss and elected to field.
- Virat Kohli (Royal Challengers Bangalore) became the first player to score 6,000 runs in the IPL.

Match 17
23 April 2021
19:30 (N)
Scorecard

Mumbai Indians; 131/6 (20 overs)	v	Punjab Kings; 132/1 (17.4 overs)
Rohit Sharma 63 (52); Ravi Bishnoi 2/21 (4 overs); Mohammed Shami 2/21 (4 overs)		KL Rahul 60* (52); Rahul Chahar 1/19 (4 overs)

Punjab Kings won by 9 wickets
M. A. Chidambaram Stadium, Chennai
Umpires: Nitin Menon (Ind) and Chettithody Shamshuddin (Ind)
Player of the match: KL Rahul (Punjab Kings)

- Punjab Kings won the toss and elected to field.

Match 18
24 April 2021
19:30 (N)
Scorecard

Kolkata Knight Riders; 133/9 (20 overs)	v	Rajasthan Royals; 134/4 (18.5 overs)
Rahul Tripathi 36 (26); Chris Morris 4/23 (4 overs)		Sanju Samson 42* (41); Varun Chakravarthy 2/32 (4 overs)

Rajasthan Royals won by 6 wickets
Wankhede Stadium, Mumbai
Umpires: Sundaram Ravi (Ind) and Navdeep Singh (Ind)
Player of the match: Chris Morris (Rajasthan Royals)

- Rajasthan Royals won the toss and elected to field.

Match 19
25 April 2021
15:30 (D/N)
Scorecard

Chennai Super Kings; 191/4 (20 overs)	v	Royal Challengers Bangalore; 122/9 (20 overs)
Ravindra Jadeja 62* (28); Harshal Patel 3/51 (4 overs)		Devdutt Padikkal 34 (15); Ravindra Jadeja 3/13 (4 overs)

Chennai Super Kings won by 69 runs
Wankhede Stadium, Mumbai
Umpires: Anil Chaudhary (Ind) and Virender Sharma (Ind)
Player of the match: Ravindra Jadeja (Chennai Super Kings)

- Chennai Super Kings won the toss and elected to bat.
- Harshal Patel (Royal Challengers Bangalore) bowled the joint-most expensive over in an IPL match, conceding 37 runs.

Match 20
25 April 2021
19:30 (N)
Scorecard

Delhi Capitals; 159/4 (20 overs)	v	Sunrisers Hyderabad; 159/7 (20 overs)
Prithvi Shaw 53 (39); Siddarth Kaul 2/31 (4 overs)		Kane Williamson 66* (51); Avesh Khan 3/34 (4 overs)

Match tied
(Delhi Capitals won the Super Over)
M. A. Chidambaram Stadium, Chennai
Umpires: K. N. Ananthapadmanabhan (Ind) and Chris Gaffaney (NZ)
Player of the match: Prithvi Shaw (Delhi Capitals)

- Delhi Capitals won the toss and elected to bat.
- Super Over: Sunrisers Hyderabad 7/0 (1 over), Delhi Capitals 8/0 (1 over)

Match 21
26 April 2021
19:30 (N)
Scorecard

Punjab Kings; 123/9 (20 overs)	v	Kolkata Knight Riders; 126/5 (16.4 overs)
Mayank Agarwal 31 (34); Prasidh Krishna 3/30 (4 overs)		Eoin Morgan 47* (40); Moises Henriques 1/5 (1 over)

Kolkata Knight Riders won 5 wickets
Narendra Modi Stadium, Ahmedabad
Umpires: Yeshwant Barde (Ind) and Paul Reiffel (Aus)
Player of the match: Eoin Morgan (Kolkata Knight Riders)

- Kolkata Knight Riders won the toss and elected to field.

Match 22
27 April 2021
19:30 (N)
Scorecard

Royal Challengers Bangalore; 171/5 (20 overs)	v	Delhi Capitals; 170/4 (20 overs)
AB de Villiers 75* (42); Avesh Khan 1/24 (4 overs)		Rishabh Pant 58* (48); Harshal Patel 2/37 (4 overs)

Royal Challengers Bangalore won by 1 run
Narendra Modi Stadium, Ahmedabad
Umpires: Sundaram Ravi (Ind) and Virender Sharma (Ind)
Player of the match: AB de Villiers (Royal Challengers Bangalore)

- Delhi Capitals won the toss and elected to field.
- AB de Villiers (Royal Challengers Bangalore) became the sixth player, and the second overseas one, to score 5,000 runs in the IPL.

Match 23
28 April 2021
19:30 (N)
Scorecard

Sunrisers Hyderabad; 171/3 (20 overs)	v	Chennai Super Kings; 173/3 (18.3 overs)
Manish Pandey 61 (46); Lungi Ngidi 2/35 (4 overs)		Ruturaj Gaikwad 75 (44); Rashid Khan 3/36 (4 overs)

Chennai Super Kings won by 7 wickets
Arun Jaitley Stadium, Delhi
Umpires: C. K. Nandan (Ind) and Chettithody Shamshuddin (Ind)
Player of the match: Ruturaj Gaikwad (Chennai Super Kings)

- Sunrisers Hyderabad won the toss and elected to bat.
- David Warner (Sunrisers Hyderabad) became the first player to hit fifty fifties in the IPL, and fourth to score 10,000 runs in T20s.

Match 24
29 April 2021
15:30 (D/N)
Scorecard

Rajasthan Royals; 171/4 (20 overs)	v	Mumbai Indians; 172/3 (18.3 overs)
Sanju Samson 42 (27); Rahul Chahar 2/33 (4 overs)		Quinton de Kock 70* (50); Chris Morris 2/33 (4 overs)

Mumbai Indians won by 7 wickets
Arun Jaitley Stadium, Delhi
Umpires: K. N. Ananthapadmanabhan (Ind) and Chris Gaffaney (NZ)
Player of the match: Quinton de Kock (Mumbai Indians)

- Mumbai Indians won the toss and elected to field.

Match 25
29 April 2021
19:30 (N)
Scorecard

Kolkata Knight Riders; 154/6 (20 overs)	v	Delhi Capitals; 156/3 (16.3 overs)
Andre Russell 45* (27); Lalit Yadav 2/13 (3 overs)		Prithvi Shaw 82 (41); Pat Cummins 3/24 (4 overs)

Delhi Capitals won by 7 wickets
Narendra Modi Stadium, Ahmedabad
Umpires: Yeshwant Barde (Ind) and Anil Chaudhary (Ind)
Player of the match: Prithvi Shaw (Delhi Capitals)

- Delhi Capitals won the toss and elected to field.

Match 26
30 April 2021
19:30 (N)
Scorecard

Punjab Kings; 179/5 (20 overs)	v	Royal Challengers Bangalore; 145/8 (20 overs)
KL Rahul 91* (57); Kyle Jamieson 2/32 (3 overs)		Virat Kohli 35 (34); Harpreet Brar 3/19 (4 overs)

Punjab Kings won by 34 runs
Narendra Modi Stadium, Ahmedabad
Umpires: Sundaram Ravi (Ind) and Virender Sharma (Ind)
Player of the match: Harpreet Brar (Punjab Kings)

- Royal Challengers Bangalore won the toss and elected to field.

Match 27
1 May 2021
19:30 (N)
Scorecard

Chennai Super Kings; 218/4 (20 overs)	v	Mumbai Indians; 219/6 (20 overs)
Ambati Rayudu 72* (27); Kieron Pollard 2/12 (2 overs)		Kieron Pollard 87* (34); Sam Curran 3/34 (4 overs)

Mumbai Indians won by 4 wickets
Arun Jaitley Stadium, Delhi
Umpires: KN Ananthapadmanabhan (Ind) and C. K. Nandan (Ind)
Player of the match: Kieron Pollard (Mumbai Indians)

- Mumbai Indians won the toss and elected to field.

Match 28
2 May 2021
15:30 (D/N)
Scorecard

Rajasthan Royals; 220/3 (20 overs)	v	Sunrisers Hyderabad; 165/8 (20 overs)
Jos Buttler 124 (64); Rashid Khan 1/24 (4 overs)		Manish Pandey 31 (20); Mustafizur Rahman 3/20 (4 overs)

Rajasthan Royals won by 55 runs
Arun Jaitley Stadium, Delhi
Umpires: Chris Gaffaney (NZ) and Chettithody Shamshuddin (Ind)
Player of the match: Jos Buttler (Rajasthan Royals)

- Sunrisers Hyderabad won the toss and elected to field.

Match 29
2 May 2021
19:30 (N)
Scorecard

Punjab Kings; 166/6 (20 overs)	v	Delhi Capitals; 167/3 (17.4 overs)
Mayank Agarwal 99* (58); Kagiso Rabada 3/36 (4 overs)		Shikhar Dhawan 69* (47); Harpreet Brar 1/19 (3 overs)

Delhi Capitals won by 7 wickets
Narendra Modi Stadium, Ahmedabad
Umpires: Anil Chaudhary (Ind) and Anil Dandekar (Ind)
Player of the match: Mayank Agarwal (Punjab Kings)

- Delhi Capitals won the toss and elected to field.

==== UAE ====
Match 30
19 September 2021
19:30 (N)
Scorecard

Chennai Super Kings; 156/6 (20 overs)	v	Mumbai Indians; 136/8 (20 overs)
Ruturaj Gaikwad 88* (58); Adam Milne 2/21 (4 overs)		Saurabh Tiwary 50* (40); Dwayne Bravo 3/25 (4 overs)

Chennai Super Kings won by 20 runs
Dubai International Cricket Stadium, Dubai
Umpires: Richard Illingworth (Eng) and Nitin Menon (Ind)
Player of the match: Ruturaj Gaikwad (Chennai Super Kings)

- Chennai Super Kings won the toss and elected to bat.

Match 31
20 September 2021
19:30 (N)
Scorecard

Royal Challengers Bangalore; 92 (19 overs)	v	Kolkata Knight Riders; 94/1 (10 overs)
Devdutt Padikkal 22 (20); Andre Russell 3/9 (3 overs)		Shubman Gill 48 (34); Yuzvendra Chahal 1/23 (2 overs)

Kolkata Knight Riders won by 9 wickets
Sheikh Zayed Cricket Stadium, Abu Dhabi
Umpires: Chris Gaffaney (NZ) and Sundaram Ravi (Ind)
Player of the match: Varun Chakravarthy (Kolkata Knight Riders)

- Royal Challengers Bangalore won the toss and elected to bat.
- Virat Kohli (Royal Challengers Bangalore) became the first player to play 200 matches for a single franchise.

Match 32
21 September 2021
19:30 (N)
Scorecard

Rajasthan Royals; 185 (20 overs)	v	Punjab Kings; 183/4 (20 overs)
Yashasvi Jaiswal 49 (36); Arshdeep Singh 5/32 (4 overs)		Mayank Agarwal 67 (43); Kartik Tyagi 2/29 (4 overs)

Rajasthan Royals won by 2 runs
Dubai International Cricket Stadium, Dubai
Umpires: Anil Chaudhary (Ind) and Michael Gough (Eng)
Player of the match: Kartik Tyagi (Rajasthan Royals)

- Punjab Kings won the toss and elected to field.

Match 33
22 September 2021
19:30 (N)
Scorecard

Sunrisers Hyderabad; 134/9 (20 overs)	v	Delhi Capitals; 139/2 (17.5 overs)
Abdul Samad 28 (21); Kagiso Rabada 3/37 (4 overs)		Shreyas Iyer 47* (41); Rashid Khan 1/26 (4 overs)

Delhi Capitals won by 8 wickets
Dubai International Cricket Stadium, Dubai
Umpires: K. N. Ananthapadmanabhan (Ind) and Richard Illingworth (Eng)
Player of the match: Anrich Nortje (Delhi Capitals)

- Sunrisers Hyderabad won the toss and elected to bat.

Match 34
23 September 2021
19:30 (N)
Scorecard

Mumbai Indians; 155/6 (20 overs)	v	Kolkata Knight Riders; 159/3 (15.1 overs)
Quinton de Kock 55 (42); Lockie Ferguson 2/27 (4 overs)		Rahul Tripathi 74* (42); Jasprit Bumrah 3/43 (4 overs)

Kolkata Knight Riders won by 7 wickets
Sheikh Zayed Cricket Stadium, Abu Dhabi
Umpires: Sundaram Ravi (Ind) and Virender Sharma (Ind)
Player of the match: Sunil Narine (Kolkata Knight Riders)

- Kolkata Knight Riders won the toss and elected to field.

Match 35
24 September 2021
19:30 (N)
Scorecard

Royal Challengers Bangalore; 156/6 (20 overs)	v	Chennai Super Kings; 157/4 (18.1 overs)
Devdutt Padikkal 70 (50); Dwayne Bravo 3/24 (4 overs)		Ruturaj Gaikwad 38 (26); Harshal Patel 2/25 (3.1 overs)

Chennai Super Kings won by 6 wickets
Sharjah Cricket Stadium, Sharjah
Umpires: Anil Chaudhary (Ind) and Nitin Menon (Ind)
Player of the match: Dwayne Bravo (Chennai Super Kings)

- Chennai Super Kings won the toss and elected to field.

Match 36
25 September 2021
15:30 (D/N)
Scorecard

Delhi Capitals; 154/6 (20 overs)	v	Rajasthan Royals; 121/6 (20 overs)
Shreyas Iyer 43 (32); Mustafizur Rahman 2/22 (4 overs)		Sanju Samson 70* (53); Anrich Nortje 2/18 (4 overs)

Delhi Capitals won by 33 runs
Sheikh Zayed Cricket Stadium, Abu Dhabi
Umpires: Chris Gaffaney (NZ) and Ulhas Gandhe (Ind)
Player of the match: Shreyas Iyer (Delhi Capitals)

- Rajasthan Royals won the toss and elected to field.

Match 37
25 September 2021
19:30 (N)
Scorecard

Punjab Kings; 125/7 (20 overs)	v	Sunrisers Hyderabad; 120/7 (20 overs)
Aiden Markram 27 (32); Jason Holder 3/19 (4 overs)		Jason Holder 47* (29); Ravi Bishnoi 3/24 (4 overs)

Punjab Kings won by 5 runs
Sharjah Cricket Stadium, Sharjah
Umpires: Yeshwant Barde (Ind) and Richard Illingworth (Eng)
Player of the match: Jason Holder (Sunrisers Hyderabad)

- Sunrisers Hyderabad won the toss and elected to field.

Match 38
26 September 2021
15:30 (D/N)
Scorecard

Kolkata Knight Riders; 171/6 (20 overs)	v	Chennai Super Kings; 172/8 (20 overs)
Rahul Tripathi 45 (33); Shardul Thakur 2/20 (4 overs)		Faf du Plessis 43 (30); Sunil Narine 3/41 (4 overs)

Chennai Super Kings won by 2 wickets
Sheikh Zayed Cricket Stadium, Abu Dhabi
Umpires: Chris Gaffaney (NZ) and Tapan Sharma (Ind)
Player of the match: Ravindra Jadeja (Chennai Super Kings)

- Kolkata Knight Riders won the toss and elected to bat.

Match 39
26 September 2021
19:30 (N)
Scorecard

Royal Challengers Bangalore; 165/6 (20 overs)	v	Mumbai Indians; 111 (18.1 overs)
Glenn Maxwell 56 (37); Jasprit Bumrah 3/36 (4 overs)		Rohit Sharma 43 (28); Harshal Patel 4/17 (3.1 overs)

Royal Challengers Bangalore won by 54 runs
Dubai International Cricket Stadium, Dubai
Umpires: Anil Chaudhary (Ind) and Michael Gough (Eng)
Player of the match: Glenn Maxwell (Royal Challengers Bangalore)

- Mumbai Indians won the toss and elected to field.
- Virat Kohli (Royal Challengers Bangalore) became the first Indian player and fifth overall to score 10,000 runs in T20s.
- Harshal Patel (Royal Challengers Bangalore) took a hat-trick.

Match 40
27 September 2021
19:30 (N)
Scorecard

Rajasthan Royals; 164/5 (20 overs)	v	Sunrisers Hyderabad; 167/3 (18.3 overs)
Sanju Samson 82 (57); Siddarth Kaul 2/36 (4 overs)		Jason Roy 60 (42); Mahipal Lomror 1/22 (3 overs)

Sunrisers Hyderabad won by 7 wickets
Dubai International Cricket Stadium, Dubai
Umpires: K. N. Ananthapadmanabhan (Ind) and Navdeep Singh (Ind)
Player of the match: Jason Roy (Sunrisers Hyderabad)

- Rajasthan Royals won the toss and elected to bat.

Match 41
28 September 2021
15:30 (D/N)
Scorecard

Delhi Capitals; 127/9 (20 overs)	v	Kolkata Knight Riders; 130/7 (18.2 overs)
Steve Smith 39 (34); Lockie Ferguson 2/10 (2 overs)		Nitish Rana 36* (27); Avesh Khan 3/13 (3 overs)

Kolkata Knight Riders won by 3 wickets
Sharjah Cricket Stadium, Sharjah
Umpires: Saiyed Khalid (Ind) and Nitin Menon (Ind)
Player of the match: Sunil Narine (Kolkata Knight Riders)

- Kolkata Knight Riders won the toss and elected to field.

Match 42
28 September 2021
19:30 (N)
Scorecard

Punjab Kings; 135/6 (20 overs)	v	Mumbai Indians; 137/4 (19 overs)
Aiden Markram 42 (29); Kieron Pollard 2/8 (1 over)		Saurabh Tiwary 45 (37); Ravi Bishnoi 2/25 (4 overs)

Mumbai Indians won by 6 wickets
Sheikh Zayed Cricket Stadium, Abu Dhabi
Umpires: Sundaram Ravi (Ind) and Virender Sharma (Ind)
Player of the match: Kieron Pollard (Mumbai Indians)

- Mumbai Indians won the toss and elected to field.

Match 43
29 September 2021
19:30 (N)
Scorecard

Rajasthan Royals; 149/9 (20 overs)	v	Royal Challengers Bangalore; 153/3 (17.1 overs)
Evin Lewis 58 (37); Harshal Patel 3/34 (4 overs)		Glenn Maxwell 50* (30); Mustafizur Rahman 2/20 (3 overs)

Royal Challengers Bangalore won by 7 wickets
Dubai International Cricket Stadium, Dubai
Umpires: K. N. Ananthapadmanabhan (Ind) and Anil Dandekar (Ind)
Player of the match: Yuzvendra Chahal (Royal Challengers Bangalore)

- Royal Challengers Bangalore won the toss and elected to field.

Match 44
30 September 2021
19:30 (N)
Scorecard

Sunrisers Hyderabad; 134/7 (20 overs)	v	Chennai Super Kings; 139/4 (19.4 overs)
Wriddhiman Saha 44 (46); Josh Hazlewood 3/24 (4 overs)		Ruturaj Gaikwad 45 (38); Jason Holder 3/27 (4 overs)

Chennai Super Kings won by 6 wickets
Sharjah Cricket Stadium, Sharjah
Umpires: Yeshwant Barde (Ind) and Nitin Menon (Ind)
Player of the match: Josh Hazlewood (Chennai Super Kings)

- Chennai Super Kings won the toss and elected to field.
- Chennai Super Kings qualified for the playoffs and Sunrisers Hyderabad were eliminated as a result of this match.

Match 45
1 October 2021
19:30 (N)
Scorecard

Kolkata Knight Riders; 165/7 (20 overs)	v	Punjab Kings; 168/5 (19.3 overs)
Venkatesh Iyer 67 (49); Arshdeep Singh 3/32 (4 overs)		KL Rahul 67 (55); Varun Chakravarthy 2/24 (4 overs)

Punjab Kings won by 5 wickets
Dubai International Cricket Stadium, Dubai
Umpires: K. N. Ananthapadmanabhan (Ind) and Richard Illingworth (Eng)
Player of the match: KL Rahul (Punjab Kings)

- Punjab Kings won the toss and elected to field.
- Delhi Capitals qualified for the playoffs as a result of this match.

Match 46
2 October 2021
15:30 (D/N)
Scorecard

Mumbai Indians; 129/8 (20 overs)	v	Delhi Capitals; 132/6 (19.1 overs)
Suryakumar Yadav 33 (26); Avesh Khan 3/15 (4 overs)		Shreyas Iyer 33* (33); Krunal Pandya 1/18 (2.1 overs)

Delhi Capitals won by 4 wickets
Sharjah Cricket Stadium, Sharjah
Umpires: Anil Chaudhary (Ind) and Michael Gough (Eng)
Player of the match: Axar Patel (Delhi Capitals)

- Delhi Capitals won the toss and elected to field.

Match 47
2 October 2021
19:30 (N)
Scorecard

Chennai Super Kings; 189/4 (20 overs)	v	Rajasthan Royals; 190/3 (17.3 overs)
Ruturaj Gaikwad 101* (60); Rahul Tewatia 3/39 (4 overs)		Shivam Dube 64* (42); Shardul Thakur 2/30 (4 overs)

Rajasthan Royals won by 7 wickets
Sheikh Zayed Cricket Stadium, Abu Dhabi
Umpires: Chris Gaffaney (NZ) and Virender Sharma (Ind)
Player of the match: Ruturaj Gaikwad (Chennai Super Kings)

- Rajasthan Royals won the toss and elected to field.

Match 48
3 October 2021
15:30 (D/N)
Scorecard

Royal Challengers Bangalore; 164/7 (20 overs)	v	Punjab Kings; 158/6 (20 overs)
Glenn Maxwell 57 (33); Moises Henriques 3/12 (4 overs)		Mayank Agarwal 57 (42); Yuzvendra Chahal 3/29 (4 overs)

Royal Challengers Bangalore won by 6 runs
Sharjah Cricket Stadium, Sharjah
Umpires: K. N. Ananthapadmanabhan (Ind) and Richard Illingworth (Eng)
Player of the match: Glenn Maxwell (Royal Challengers Bangalore)

- Royal Challengers Bangalore won the toss and elected to bat.
- Royal Challengers Bangalore qualified for the playoffs as a result of this match.

Match 49
3 October 2021
19:30 (N)
Scorecard

Sunrisers Hyderabad; 115/8 (20 overs)	v	Kolkata Knight Riders; 119/4 (19.4 overs)
Kane Williamson 26 (21); Tim Southee 2/26 (4 overs); Varun Chakravarthy 2/26 (4 overs)		Shubman Gill 57 (51); Jason Holder 2/32 (4 overs)

Kolkata Knight Riders won by 6 wickets
Dubai International Cricket Stadium, Dubai
Umpires: Michael Gough (Eng) and Jayaraman Madanagopal (Ind)
Player of the match: Shubman Gill (Kolkata Knight Riders)

- Sunrisers Hyderabad won the toss and elected to bat.

Match 50
4 October 2021
19:30 (N)
Scorecard

Chennai Super Kings; 136/5 (20 overs)	v	Delhi Capitals; 139/7 (19.4 overs)
Ambati Rayudu 55* (55); Axar Patel 2/18 (4 overs)		Shikhar Dhawan 39 (35); Shardul Thakur 2/13 (4 overs)

Delhi Capitals won by 3 wickets
Dubai International Cricket Stadium, Dubai
Umpires: Anil Chaudhary (Ind) and Nitin Menon (Ind)
Player of the match: Axar Patel (Delhi Capitals)

- Delhi Capitals won the toss and elected to field.

Match 51
5 October 2021
19:30 (N)
Scorecard

Rajasthan Royals; 90/9 (20 overs)	v	Mumbai Indians; 94/2 (8.2 overs)
Evin Lewis 24 (19); Nathan Coulter-Nile 4/14 (4 overs)		Ishan Kishan 50* (25); Mustafizur Rahman 1/32 (2.2 overs)

Mumbai Indians won by 8 wickets
Sharjah Cricket Stadium, Sharjah
Umpires: Anil Chaudhary (Ind) and Michael Gough (Eng)
Player of the match: Nathan Coulter-Nile (Mumbai Indians)

- Mumbai Indians won the toss and elected to field.
- Kuldip Yadav (Rajasthan Royals) made his T20 debut.

Match 52
6 October 2021
19:30 (N)
Scorecard

Sunrisers Hyderabad; 141/7 (20 overs)	v	Royal Challengers Bangalore; 137/6 (20 overs)
Jason Roy 44 (38); Harshal Patel 3/33 (4 overs)		Devdutt Padikkal 41 (52); Umran Malik 1/21 (4 overs)

Sunrisers Hyderabad won by 4 runs
Sheikh Zayed Cricket Stadium, Abu Dhabi
Umpires: Ulhas Gandhe (Ind) and Sundaram Ravi (Ind)
Player of the match: Kane Williamson (Sunrisers Hyderabad)

- Royal Challengers Bangalore won the toss and elected to field.

Match 53
7 October 2021
15:30 (D/N)
Scorecard

Chennai Super Kings; 134/6 (20 overs)	v	Punjab Kings; 139/4 (13 overs)
Faf du Plessis 76 (55); Chris Jordan 2/20 (3 overs)		KL Rahul 98* (42); Shardul Thakur 3/28 (3 overs)

Punjab Kings won by 6 wickets
Dubai International Cricket Stadium, Dubai
Umpires: Richard Illingworth (Eng) and Krishnamachari Srinivasan (Ind)
Player of the match: KL Rahul (Punjab Kings)

- Punjab Kings won the toss and elected to field.
- Delhi Capitals advanced to Qualifier 1 as a result of this match.

Match 54
7 October 2021
19:30 (N)
Scorecard

Kolkata Knight Riders; 171/4 (20 overs)	v	Rajasthan Royals; 85 (16.1 overs)
Shubman Gill 56 (44); Rahul Tewatia 1/11 (1 over)		Rahul Tewatia 44 (36); Shivam Mavi 4/21 (3.1 overs)

Kolkata Knight Riders won by 86 runs
Sharjah Cricket Stadium, Sharjah
Umpires: Michael Gough (Eng) and Saiyed Khalid (Ind)
Player of the match: Shivam Mavi (Kolkata Knight Riders)

- Rajasthan Royals won the toss and elected to field.
- Punjab Kings and Rajasthan Royals were eliminated as a result of this match.

Match 55
8 October 2021
19:30 (N)
Scorecard

Mumbai Indians; 235/9 (20 overs)	v	Sunrisers Hyderabad; 193/8 (20 overs)
Ishan Kishan 84 (32); Jason Holder 4/52 (4 overs)		Manish Pandey 69* (41); James Neesham 2/28 (3 overs)

Mumbai Indians won by 42 runs
Sheikh Zayed Cricket Stadium, Abu Dhabi
Umpires: Tapan Sharma (Ind) and Virender Sharma (Ind)
Player of the match: Ishan Kishan (Mumbai Indians)

- Mumbai Indians won the toss and elected to bat.
- Kolkata Knight Riders qualified for the playoffs and Mumbai Indians were eliminated as a result of this match.

Match 56
8 October 2021
19:30 (N)
Scorecard

Delhi Capitals; 164/5 (20 overs)	v	Royal Challengers Bangalore; 166/3 (20 overs)
Prithvi Shaw 48 (31); Mohammed Siraj 2/25 (4 overs)		K. S. Bharat 78* (52); Anrich Nortje 2/24 (4 overs)

Royal Challengers Bangalore won by 7 wickets
Dubai International Cricket Stadium, Dubai
Umpires: K. N. Ananthapadmanabhan (Ind) and Nitin Menon (Ind)
Player of the match: K. S. Bharat (Royal Challengers Bangalore)

- Royal Challengers Bangalore won the toss and elected to field.
- Chennai Super Kings advanced to Qualifier 1 having a better net run rate than the Royal Challengers Bangalore.

== Playoffs ==
The top-four teams qualified for the playoffs. The first two teams would play each other in the first qualifier, where the winner would progress to the final, while the loser would play in the second qualifier. The eliminator was played between the third and fourth teams. While the loser was knocked off, the winner would advance to the second qualifier. The winner of this match would qualify as the second finalist. The IPL 2021 playoffs started on 10 October 2021, and the final was played on 15 October.

Qualifier 1 / Eliminator
10 October 2021 — Dubai
1	Delhi Capitals	172/5 (20 overs)
2	Chennai Super Kings	173/6 (19.4 overs)
11 October 2021 — Sharjah
3	Royal Challengers Bangalore	138/7 (20 overs)
4	Kolkata Knight Riders	139/6 (19.4 overs)

Qualifier 2
13 October 2021 — Sharjah
Q1L	Delhi Capitals	135/5 (20 overs)
EW	Kolkata Knight Riders	136/7 (19.5 overs)

Final
15 October 2021 — Dubai
Q1W	Chennai Super Kings	192/3 (20 overs)
Q2W	Kolkata Knight Riders	165/9 (20 overs)

=== Qualifier 1 ===
10 October 2021
19:30 (N)
Scorecard

Delhi Capitals; 172/5 (20 overs)	v	Chennai Super Kings; 173/6 (19.4 overs)
Prithvi Shaw 60 (34); Josh Hazlewood 2/29 (4 overs)		Ruturaj Gaikwad 70 (50); Tom Curran 3/29 (3.4 overs)

Chennai Super Kings won by 4 wickets
Dubai International Cricket Stadium, Dubai
Umpires: Richard Illingworth (Eng) and Nitin Menon (Ind)
Player of the match: Ruturaj Gaikwad (Chennai Super Kings)

- Chennai Super Kings won the toss and elected to field.

=== Eliminator ===
11 October 2021
19:30 (N)
Scorecard

Royal Challengers Bangalore; 138/7 (20 overs)	v	Kolkata Knight Riders; 139/6 (19.4 overs)
Virat Kohli 39 (33); Sunil Narine 4/21 (4 overs)		Shubman Gill 29 (18); Yuzvendra Chahal 2/16 (4 overs)

Kolkata Knight Riders won by 4 wickets
Sharjah Cricket Stadium, Sharjah
Umpires: Chris Gaffaney (NZ) and Virender Sharma (Ind)
Player of the match: Sunil Narine (Kolkata Knight Riders)

- Royal Challengers Bangalore won the toss and elected to bat.

=== Qualifier 2 ===
13 October 2021
19:30 (N)
Scorecard

Delhi Capitals; 135/5 (20 overs)	v	Kolkata Knight Riders; 136/7 (19.5 overs)
Shikhar Dhawan 36 (39); Varun Chakaravarthy 2/26 (4 overs)		Venkatesh Iyer 55 (41); Kagiso Rabada 2/23 (4 overs)

Kolkata Knight Riders won by 3 wickets
Sharjah Cricket Stadium, Sharjah
Umpires: K. N. Ananthapadmanabhan (Ind) and Michael Gough (Eng)
Player of the match: Venkatesh Iyer (Kolkata Knight Riders)

- Kolkata Knight Riders won the toss and elected to field.

=== Final ===
15 October 2021
19:30 (N)
Scorecard

Chennai Super Kings; 192/3 (20 overs)	v	Kolkata Knight Riders; 165/9 (20 overs)
Faf du Plessis 86 (59); Sunil Narine 2/26 (4 overs)		Shubman Gill 51 (43); Shardul Thakur 3/38 (4 overs)

Chennai Super Kings won by 27 runs
Dubai International Cricket Stadium, Dubai
Umpires: Richard Illingworth (Eng) and Nitin Menon (Ind)
Player of the match: Faf du Plessis (Chennai Super Kings)

- Kolkata Knight Riders won the toss and elected to field.

Kolkata Knight Riders won the toss and opted to bowl. Chennai Super Kings scored 192 runs in 20 overs, losing 3 wickets. Faf du Plessis became the highest scorer with 86 runs, while Ruturaj Gaikwad and Moeen Ali complimented with substantial scores. For the fielding team, Sunil Narine took 2 wickets. In the second innings, Kolkata started well after Venkatesh Iyer made a fifty. But they soon lost many wickets, with Shardul Thakur taking 3 of them. Chennai went on to win the match by 27 runs.

== Statistics and awards ==
Players are given several awards with a trophy and prize money at the end of each season. The Most Valuable Player award is given to the player who accumulates the most points, depending upon their overall performance like the number of fours, sixes and wickets. The Orange Cap is given to the player who scored the most runs, while the Purple Cap is presented to the one with most wickets. The Emerging Player award is given to a young player with the most promising performance, who meets the given guidelines. Fairplay award is given to the team which played most in accordance with the rules, being fair, and upholding the spirit of the game. The player who changed the game for their teams gets the Gamechanger award, and the one with the highest strike rate is presented with the Super Striker award. The player hitting the most sixes gets an award, along with the one who performs the best in the powerplay. The Perfect Catch of the Season award is given to the player who took the best catch in the season. Ravi Bishnoi of the Punjab Kings won the award for his catch taken against Kolkata Knight Riders in match 21 to dismiss Sunil Narine, where he took a diving catch at deep mid-wicket.

=== Most runs ===
Player	Team	Mat	Inns	Runs	HS
Ruturaj Gaikwad	Chennai Super Kings	16	16	635	101*
Faf du Plessis	Chennai Super Kings	16	16	633	95*
KL Rahul	Punjab Kings	13	13	626	98*
Shikhar Dhawan	Delhi Capitals	16	16	587	92
Glenn Maxwell	Royal Challengers Bangalore	15	14	513	78

- Orange Cap

=== Most wickets ===
Player	Team	Mat	Inns	Wkts	BBI
Harshal Patel	Royal Challengers Bangalore	15	15	32	5/27
Avesh Khan	Delhi Capitals	16	16	24	3/13
Jasprit Bumrah	Mumbai Indians	14	14	21	3/36
Shardul Thakur	Chennai Super Kings	16	16	21	3/28
Mohammed Shami	Punjab Kings	14	14	19	3/21

- Purple Cap

=== End of the season awards ===
Player	Team	Award	Prize
Ruturaj Gaikwad	Chennai Super Kings	Emerging Player of the Season	₹10 lakh (US$10,000)
	Rajasthan Royals	Fairplay Award	Team trophy
Ravi Bishnoi	Punjab Kings	Catch of the season	₹10 lakh (US$10,000)
Harshal Patel	Royal Challengers Bangalore	Gamechanger award	₹10 lakh (US$10,000)
Shimron Hetmyer	Delhi Capitals	Super Striker	₹10 lakh (US$10,000) and a car
KL Rahul	Punjab Kings	Most sixes	₹10 lakh (US$10,000)
Venkatesh Iyer	Kolkata Knight Riders	Power player	₹10 lakh (US$10,000)
Harshal Patel	Royal Challengers Bangalore	Most Valuable Player	₹10 lakh (US$10,000)

== See also ==
- Impact of the COVID-19 pandemic on cricket
