= Venkatesh Iyer =

Indian cricketer (born 1994)

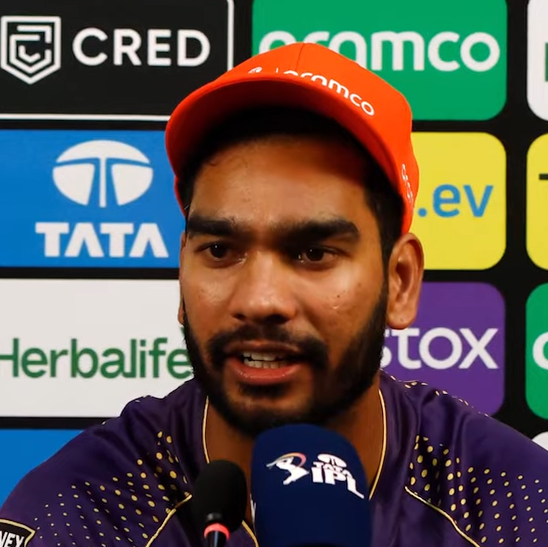

Personal information
- Full name: Venkatesh Rajasekaran Iyer
- Born: 25 December 1994 (age 31); Indore, Madhya Pradesh, India
- Height: 6 ft 4 in (193 cm)
- Batting: Left-handed
- Bowling: Right-arm medium
- Role: Batting all-rounder

International information
- National side: India (2021–2022)
- ODI debut (cap 242): 19 January 2022 v South Africa
- Last ODI: 21 January 2022 v South Africa
- T20I debut (cap 93): 17 November 2021 v New Zealand
- Last T20I: 27 February 2022 v Sri Lanka

Domestic team information
- Years: Team
- 2015–present: Madhya Pradesh
- 2021–2025: Kolkata Knight Riders
- 2024: Lancashire
- 2026–present: Royal Challengers Bengaluru

Career statistics
| Competition | ODI | T20I | FC | LA |
|---|---|---|---|---|
| Matches | 2 | 9 | 34 | 61 |
| Runs scored | 24 | 133 | 2,025 | 1,744 |
| Batting average | 12.00 | 33.25 | 38.20 | 37.10 |
| 100s/50s | 0/0 | 0/0 | 2/16 | 4/6 |
| Top score | 22 | 35* | 174 | 198 |
| Balls bowled | 30 | 55 | 1,349 | 1,305 |
| Wickets | 0 | 5 | 20 | 34 |
| Bowling average | – | 15.00 | 32.10 | 36.02 |
| 5 wickets in innings | – | 0 | 0 | 0 |
| 10 wickets in match | – | 0 | 0 | 0 |
| Best bowling | – | 2/23 | 3/23 | 4/44 |
| Catches/stumpings | 0/– | 4/– | 15/– | 28/– |
- Source: Cricinfo, 22 October 2026

Venkatesh Rajasekaran Iyer (born 25 December 1994) is an Indian cricketer who plays for Madhya Pradesh in domestic cricket and Royal Challengers Bengaluru in the Indian Premier League.

== Domestic career ==
Iyer made his Twenty20 debut against Railways cricket team at Holkar Stadium in March 2015 and made his List A debut against Saurashtra cricket team at Saurashtra Cricket Association Stadium in December of the same year, while he was pursuing a Bachelor of Commerce degree. After passing the CA Intermediate examinations, he decided to dropout and enroll himself in a Master of Business Administration in finance to allow him to pursue cricket further. He made his first-class debut for Madhya Pradesh in the 2018–19 Ranji Trophy on 6 December 2018. Iyer finished as Madhya Pradesh's top scorer in the 2021-22 Syed Mushtaq Ali Trophy with 155 runs at an average of 51.66. He continued his form in the 2021-22 Vijay Hazare Trophy scoring 379 runs at an average of 63.16 with a strike rate of over 133, batting in the lower middle order. This included two centuries, one of which was a score of 151, which made him the first batsman to score a score of 150 or more whilst batting at number six or lower in the Vijay Hazare Trophy. He also took 9 wickets in six matches.

== Indian Premier League ==
In February 2021, Iyer was bought by the Kolkata Knight Riders in the IPL auction ahead of the 2021 Indian Premier League. On 20 September 2021, upon resumption of the IPL in the United Arab Emirates, he made his IPL debut against Royal Challengers Bangalore. On 23 September 2021, he scored his maiden IPL fifty against Mumbai Indians.

Iyer emerged as a key player for KKR for the rest of the tournament, aiding in their run to the final, by scoring 370 runs at an average of 41 and a strike rate of 129. He was named as player of the match in the second qualifier, after scoring 55 runs and he followed this up with another half century in the final. Alongside his opening partner Shubman Gill, he put on an opening stand of 91, which proved to be in vain as KKR lost the match.

On 16 April 2023, Iyer scored his maiden IPL Century against Mumbai Indians scoring 104 runs in 51 balls. Thus, he became only the 2nd Batter to score a century for KKR after Brendon McCullum did in the first match of IPL 2008, 15 years ago, but his century went in vain as KKR was defeated by Mumbai Indians.

On 24 November 2024, Iyer was bought back by Kolkata Knight Riders for Rs.23.75 crore, becoming one of the most expensive players in the history of the IPL. He was announced as the vice-captain of the team for the 2025 edition, succeeding Nitish Rana.

He was released by Kollata Knight Riders ahead of the 2026 IPL season, subsequently on 16 December 2025, Iyer was bought by Royal Challengers Bangalore for Rs.7 crore.

== International career ==
He was asked to stay back in UAE to be a net bowler in India's 2021 ICC T20 World Cup squad. In November 2021, he was named in India's Twenty20 International (T20I) squad for their series against New Zealand. He made his T20I debut on 17 November 2021, for India against New Zealand. He made his international bowling debut in the final match of this series, returning figures of 3-0-12-1.

In December 2021, he was named in India's One Day International (ODI) squad for their series against South Africa. He made his ODI debut on 19 January 2022, for India against South Africa.

In January 2022, he was named in India's T20I squad for their series against the West Indies, where he played all three matches, playing a finishing role in the lower middle order scoring his runs at a strike rate of 179.24. He also picked up two wickets in the series.

In June 2022, Iyer was named in India's squad for their T20I series against Ireland.

== Personal life ==
On 2 June 2024, Iyer married Shruti Raghunathan.
