= Ruturaj Gaikwad =

Indian cricketer (born 1997)

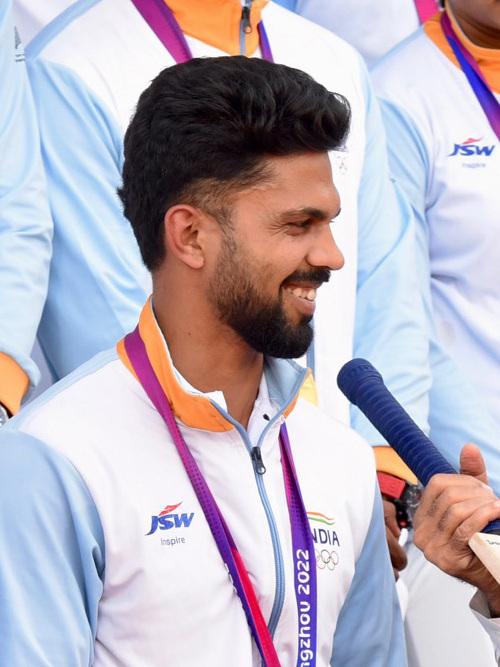
- Ruturaj at the 2022 Asian Games

Personal information
- Full name: Ruturaj Dashrat Gaikwad
- Born: 31 January 1997 (age 29); Pune, Maharashtra, India
- Nickname: Rutu, Rocket Raja
- Batting: Right-handed
- Bowling: Right arm off break
- Role: Batsman, Occasionally Wicket Keeper

International information
- National side: India (2021–present)
- ODI debut (cap 246): 6 October 2022 v South Africa
- Last ODI: 13 November 2026 v New Zealand
- ODI shirt no.: 31
- T20I debut (cap 88): 28 July 2021 v Sri Lanka
- Last T20I: 13 July 2024 v Zimbabwe
- T20I shirt no.: 31

Domestic team information
- Years: Team
- 2016–present: Maharashtra
- 2019–present: Chennai Super Kings
- 2023–present: Puneri Bappa

Career statistics
Competition	ODI	T20I	FC	LA
Matches	9	23	45	104
Runs scored	228	633	3,258	5,334
Batting average	28.5	39.56	45.25	58.61
100s/50s	1/1	1/4	9/17	21/20
Top score	105	123*	195	220*
Catches/stumpings	4/0	11/0	38/0	40/0
Medal record
Men's cricket
Representing India
Asian Games
Gold medal – first place	2022 Hangzhou
- Source: ESPNcricinfo, 08 June 2026

Ruturaj Dashrat Gaikwad (born 31 January 1997) is an Indian cricketer who plays for the India national cricket team. He is a right-handed top order batter. He captained the Indian team that won the gold medal in the 2022 Asian Games.

Ruturaj made his T20 International debut for the Indian team against Sri Lanka in July 2021. He played his first One Day International in October 2022 against South Africa. In domestic cricket, he plays for Maharashtra and captains the side in the T20 and List A formats. He holds the records for the most number of centuries in the Vijay Hazare Trophy and the fastest century for Maharashtra in List A cricket. He has also represented the West Zone and captained the Rest of India side in the past.

In franchise cricket, Ruturaj plays for and captains the Chennai Super Kings in the Indian Premier League (IPL). He has won the IPL title in 2021 and 2023 with the Super Kings. He was the leading run-scorer in the 2021 IPL season and won emerging player of the season award.

== Early and personal life ==
Ruturaj Dashrat Gaikwad was born on 31 January 1997 in a Marathi family in Pune, Maharashtra. His father Dasharath Gaikwad worked with the Defence Research and Development Organisation, and his mother Sawita is a school teacher. He did his schooling from St Joseph's Boys' High School in Khadki, and Lakashmibai Nadgude school in Pimple Nilakh, Pune. He attended the Marathvada Mitra Mandal's Polytechnic. According to Ruturaj, his parents encouraged him to take up cricket.

Ruturaj lives in the Sangvi area of Pimpri-Chinchwad in Pune. On 3 June 2023, he married his long-time girlfriend Utkarsha Pawar at Mahabaleshwar.

== Early career ==
Ruturaj joined the Varroc Dilip Vengsarkar academy in Thergaon at the age of 13. In the 2010 Cadence trophy, he scored 63 runs in a match against Mumbai's MIG Cricket club and was declared the player of the match. At the 2015 Maharashtra invitational tournament, he scored 306 runs in an innings.

Ruturaj represented the Maharashtra Under-19 team in the 2014-15 edition of the Vinoo Mankad Trophy and scored 313 runs from four innings including a century and two half centuries. In the Cooch Behar Trophy that followed, he scored 826 runs in 11 innings at an average of 82.60, and was the second highest run getter in the tournament. In the 2015-16 edition of the Vinoo Mankad Trophy, he represented the West Zone Under-19 team and scored 151 runs from four innings. In the Cooch Behar Trophy, he led the Maharashtra U-19 side, and scored 875 runs from 11 innings, averaging 97.22 with four centuries .

== Domestic career ==
Ruturaj made his first-class debut for Maharashtra in the 2016-17 season of the Ranji Trophy on 6 October 2016. He made his Twenty20 debut in the 2016–17 Inter State Twenty-20 Tournament on 2 February 2017, and List A debut in the 2016-17 edition of the Vijay Hazare Trophy on 25 February 2017. In the Vijay Hazare tournament, he finished as the third highest run getter with 444 runs at an average of 63.42 including a century and three half-centuries. He represented the West zone in the zonal tournaments. In October 2018, he was named in India B squad for the 2018–19 Deodhar Trophy. In the 2019-20 Ranji Trophy season, he scored 184 runs including a century for Maharashtra against Chhattisgarh, and was awarded the player of the match for his efforts.

In August 2019, Ruturaj was named in the India Blue squad for the 2019–20 Duleep Trophy. In the subsequent 2019–20 Deodhar Trophy held in October 2019, he was part of the India B squad. He scored four centuries in four matches in the 2019 Mandke trophy. He scored 259 runs in five matches at an average of 51.80, including three fifties in the 2021-22 season of the Syed Mushtaq Ali Trophy Twenty20 competition. In the 2021–22 season of the Vijay Hazare trophy, he scored over 600 runs with four centuries, and equaled Virat Kohli's earlier record for the maximum centuries in a single edition of the tournament.

In November 2022, during the quarter-final match between Maharashtra and Uttar Pradesh in the 2022–23 Vijay Hazare Trophy, Ruturaj became the first batter to hit seven sixes in a six-ball over (including one of a no ball) in all forms of cricket. In the final against Saurashtra, he scored another century, his 12th in the history of the tournament. With this, he took the record for the most number of centuries in the tournament, which he earlier jointly held with Robin Uthappa and Ankit Bawne (11 each). He finished as the second highest run-getter in the tournament with 660 runs in five games.

Ruturaj was named the captain of the India C team for the 2024-25 Duleep Trophy tournament, in which he ended up in the top five run-getters. He was later named a captain of the Rest of India cricket team for the 2024-25 Irani Cup match against Mumbai. In December 2024, in the Vijay Hazare trophy match against Services, he recorded the fastest century for Maharastra in 57 balls. In August 2025, he was named in the West zone squad for 2025–26 Duleep Trophy, playing his first professional game since his elbow injury in April. He scored 200 runs across two innings including an unbeaten 184 in the first innings. He was named as the vice-captain for the Rest Of India team for the 2025–26 Irani Cup against the Ranji Trophy winners Vidarbha.

In the opening match of the 2025–26 Ranji Trophy season against Kerala, Maharashtra lost five wickets for 18 runs, before Ruturaj and Jalaj Saxena stitched a partnership of 122 runs with Ruturaj himself scoring 91 runs. The match ended in a draw, Ruturaj was awarded the player of the match award. In the second match against Chandigarh, he scored 142 runs across two innings including a century in the first innings to help Maharashtra secure a win. He shared the player of the match award with team-mate Prithvi Shaw. In the 2025–26 Vijay Hazare Trophy, he played in the middle-order unlike this usual position in the top order, and finished as the top scorer for Maharashtra with 413 runs at an average of 82.60 with two centuries.

== International career ==
In December 2018, Ruturaj was named in the Indian under-23 team for the 2018 ACC Emerging Teams Asia Cup. In June 2019, he scored 187 runs for India A in the win against Sri Lanka A and was awarded the player of the match.

In June 2021, Ruturaj was named in the India squad for the One Day International (ODI) and Twenty20 International (T20I) matches for the away series against Sri Lanka. He made his T20I debut on 28 July 2021 in the second match of the series. Though he was named in India's ODI squad for their away series against South Africa in December 2021, and the home series against the West Indies in January 2022, he did not play any of the matches. In June 2022, he scored his maiden T20I half-century against South Africa. In July 2022, he was again named in India's ODI squad for their away series against the West Indies, without playing a match. On 6 October 2022, he made his ODI debut in the first match of the home series against South Africa.

In June 2023, Ruturaj was named in the Test squad for the first time for the away series against the West Indies. In July 2023, he was named as India's vice-captain for the series away series against Ireland. He ended the series as the leading run scorer with 77 runs from the two matches. In September 2023, he was part of the ODI squad for the first two matches in the home series against Australia. On September 22, he scored 71 runs in the first match of the series which was his maiden half-century in ODIs. In July 2023, he was named as captain of the Indian T20I team for the 2022 Asian Games. He led India to win the gold medal in the competition and became the first Indian captain to do so in Men's Cricket at the Asian Games and the first Indian captain to win the medal at the Asian Games.

In November 2023, Ruturaj was named the vice-captain for the first three matches of the T20I series against Australia. After a duck in the first match, he followed that up with a half-century in the second T20I and scored his maiden international century in the third match of the series. His performance (127 runs) in the third match secured multiple records including becoming the third highest score by an Indian batter, the first Indian to score a century against Australia in T20Is and the highest score by a batter against Australia in T20Is. In June 2024, he was named in the Indian squad for the tour of Zimbabwe. In the second match of the series against Zimbabwe, he scored 77 runs in 49 balls in a 137 run partnership with Abhishek Sharma. In the next match, he hit 49 runs of 28 balls in a win for the Indian team.

In October 2024, Ruturaj was named as the captain of the India A side for the tour of Australia to play two first class games. While he was initially named as a part of the India A squad for the tour of England, he didn't feature due to his elbow injury sustained earlier. He made a comeback to the India A team for the home series against South Africa A in November 2025. in which he scored 210 runs across the three match series, most by anyone, He was awarded Man of the Series for his match winning performances.

In November 2025, Ruturaj made a comeback to the Indian team for the home series against South Africa. In the second match of the series, he scored his maiden ODI century.

== Franchise career ==
=== Indian Premier League ===
In December 2018, Ruturaj was bought by the Chennai Super Kings in the player auction for the 2019 season of the Indian Premier League (IPL). He made his debut for the Super Kings during the 2020 season of the IPL. On 2 October 2021, he scored his first IPL century, with an unbeaten 101 against the Rajasthan Royals in the 2021 season. In the finals, the Super Kings beat the Kolkata Knight Riders to win their fourth IPL title. He won the Orange Cap for scoring the most runs (635) in the 2021 season and was also awarded the Emerging Player of the Year award. After his performance in the 2021 season, he was retained by the Super Kings for ₹60 million (US$640,000) ahead of the 2022 IPL auction. In the 2023 IPL season, he scored 590 runs across 14 matches and was amongst the top ten run scorers in the tournament. The team finished second in the group stage with 17 points from eight wins. The Super Kings beat defending champions Gujarat Titans by five wickets to win a record equaling fifth IPL title.

On 21 March 2024, Ruturaj was appointed as the captain of the Super Kings following the decision of long-term captain M S Dhoni to step down from the role. He had an excellent tournament with the bat during the 2024 IPL season, finishing second on the run scoring charts with 583 runs. However, the Super Kings finished with 14 points from seven wins from 14 matches, and was tied with three other teams in the competition for the fourth and final play-off spot. However, the team was classified fifth on net run rate, and failed to qualify for the IPL playoffs for only the third time in the history of the competition. He played only five matches in the 2025 IPL season, before being ruled out of the tournament with an elbow injury.

=== Others ===
In 2023, Ruturaj was bought by Puneri Bappa in the Maharashtra Premier League T20 competition for ₹148 million (US$1.6 million). The franchise later named as announced him as the captain for inaugural season.

Ruturaj signed with Yorkshire for the County Championship in 2025, which also included One-Day cup stint. However, he later pulled out of the deal due to personal reasons.

== Honours ==
Chennai Super Kings

- Indian Premier League: 2021, 2023

India

- Asian Games gold medal: 2022

Individual

- Indian Premier League Orange Cap: 2021
