= Shivam Mavi =

Indian cricketer (born 1998)

Personal information
- Full name: Shivam Pankaj Mavi
- Born: 26 November 1998 (age 27); Noida, Uttar Pradesh, India
- Height: 1.75 m (5 ft 9 in)
- Batting: Right-handed
- Bowling: Right-arm fast-medium
- Role: Bowler

International information
- National side: India (2023)
- T20I debut (cap 100): 3 January 2023 v Sri Lanka
- Last T20I: 1 February 2023 v New Zealand

Domestic team information
- Years: Team
- 2018–present: Uttar Pradesh
- 2018–2022: Kolkata Knight Riders
- 2026: Sunrisers Hyderabad

Career statistics
Competition	T20I	FC	LA	T20
Matches	6	19	46	61
Runs scored	28	355	330	158
Batting average	14.00	18.68	16.50	8.77
100s/50s	0/0	0/0	0/1	0/0
Top score	26	48	52*	45*
Balls bowled	84	3,002	2,083	1,218
Wickets	7	72	72	57
Bowling average	17.57	21.95	24.09	29.29
5 wickets in innings	0	3	2	0
10 wickets in match	0	0	0	0
Best bowling	4/22	6/44	5/29	4/14
Catches/stumpings	3/–	8/–	21/–	26/–
Medal record
Men's cricket
Representing India
ICC U19 Cricket World Cup
Winner	2018 New Zealand
- Source: ESPNcricinfo, 4 February 2025

Shivam Pankaj Mavi (born 26 November 1998) is an Indian international cricketer, who is a right-arm fast-medium bowler. He made his international debut for the Indian cricket team in January 2023.

== Domestic and T20 franchise career ==
In January 2018, he was bought by the Kolkata Knight Riders in the 2018 IPL auction. He made his Twenty20 debut for the Kolkata Knight Riders in the 2018 Indian Premier League on 14 April 2018.

On the opening day of the 2018–19 Vijay Hazare Trophy in September 2018, Mavi took a hat-trick for Uttar Pradesh against Saurashtra.

He made his first-class debut for Uttar Pradesh in the 2018–19 Ranji Trophy on 1 November 2018. On his Ranji debut, Mavi took a 4-fer against Goa in Kanpur, as Uttar Pradesh bowled Goa out for just 152. In his second first-class match against Odisha, he picked up his maiden five-wicket haul.

In February 2018, he was bought by the Kolkata Knight Riders in the auction for the 2018 Indian Premier League tournament.

== International career ==
In December 2017, he was named in India's squad for the 2018 Under-19 Cricket World Cup. In July 2018, he was selected to play for the India A cricket team in the 2018 India Quadrangular Series. He made his List A debut for India A against South Africa A in the Quadrangular Series on 27 August 2018.

In December 2018, he was named in India's team for the 2018 ACC Emerging Teams Asia Cup. In November 2019, he replaced injured Arshdeep Singh in India's squad for the 2019 ACC Emerging Teams Asia Cup.

In December 2022, Mavi earned his maiden call-up to the Indian cricket team for their Twenty20 International (T20I) series against Sri Lanka. On 3 January 2023, he made his T20I debut for India against Sri Lanka at Wankhede Stadium, Mumbai. He picked up 4 wickets for 22 runs and became the third Indian cricketer to take four wickets on T20I debut. His outstanding spell on debut helped India to register a thrilling 2-run victory over Sri Lanka in the opening T20I match.
