= Nitish Rana =

Indian cricketer (born 1993)

Personal information
- Born: 27 December 1993 (age 32); Delhi, India
- Height: 5 ft 10 in (1.78 m)
- Batting: Left-handed
- Bowling: Right-arm off break
- Role: Batting allrounder

International information
- National side: India
- Only ODI (cap 239): 23 July 2021 v Sri Lanka
- T20I debut (cap 90): 28 July 2021 v Sri Lanka
- Last T20I: 29 July 2021 v Sri Lanka

Domestic team information
- Years: Team
- 2012/13–present: Delhi
- 2016–2017: Mumbai Indians (squad no. 27)
- 2018–2024: Kolkata Knight Riders (squad no. 27)
- 2023/24–2024/25: Uttar Pradesh
- 2025: Rajasthan Royals
- 2026: Delhi Capitals

Career statistics
Competition	ODI	T20I
Matches	1	2
Runs scored	7	15
Batting average	7.00	7.50
100s/50s	0/0	0/0
Top score	7	9
Catches/stumpings	0/–	0/–
- Source: ESPNcricinfo, 28 March 2025

Nitish Rana (born 27 December 1993) is an Indian cricketer who represented the national team in One Day International and Twenty20 International cricket in 2021. He is a left-handed batsman and an off spin bowler. In the Indian Premier League (IPL), he has played for the Mumbai Indians, Kolkata Knight Riders and was acquired by the Rajasthan Royals ahead of the 2025 IPL season. In November 2018, he was appointed captain of Delhi cricket team, succeeding former captain Gautam Gambhir. He also captained Kolkata Knight Riders during the IPL 2023 season in place of regular captain Shreyas Iyer who was out with an injury.

== Domestic career ==
After Delhi lost three of their top four batsmen for single digit scores against Baroda, Rana top-scored once again with 53 off just 29 balls and helped his team chase down Baroda's total of 153. Against Jharkhand, he hit an unbeaten 60 off 44 balls after Delhi were reduced to 14 for 3 in their chase of 135 and helped his team to a 5-wicket win. In January 2018, he was bought by the Kolkata Knight Riders in the 2018 IPL auction.

In October 2018, Rana was named in India A's squad for the 2018–19 Deodhar Trophy. In December 2018, he was named in India's team for the 2018 ACC Emerging Teams Asia Cup. In October 2019, he was named in India B's squad for the 2019–20 Deodhar Trophy.

Rana was one of 22 players banned by Board of Control for Cricket in India (BCCI) for age-fudging in 2015. Ahead of the 2020 Indian Premier League, Rana was reportedly investigated again for his involvement in age-fudging but the allegations were proved wrong.

== IPL 2026 ==
Ahead of IPL 2026, Rana joined Delhi Capitals after being traded to them from Rajasthan Royals.

== International career ==
In June 2021, Rana was named in India's One Day International (ODI) and Twenty20 International (T20I) squads for their series against Sri Lanka. He made his ODI debut on 23 July 2021, for India against Sri Lanka. He scored 7 runs off 14 balls on his debut. He made his T20I debut on 28 July 2021, for India against Sri Lanka.

== Personal life ==
Rana was born on 27 December 1993 in Delhi. On 18 February 2019, Rana married his long-term girlfriend Saachi Marwah, who is a cousin of Indian comedian Krushna Abhishek.
