= 2012 Delhi Daredevils season =

Indian Premier League cricket team season

Delhi Daredevils
2012 season
- Coach: Eric Simons
- Captains: Virender Sehwag; Mahela Jayawardene; Ross Taylor (stand-in captain)
- Overseas players: List: Doug Bracewell; Aaron Finch; Mahela Jayawardene; Glenn Maxwell; Morné Morkel; Kevin Pietersen; Andre Russell; Ross Taylor; Roelof van der Merwe; David Warner; Travis Birt (withdrawn); Colin Ingram (withdrawn)
- Indian Premier League: 3rd place
- Champions League Twenty20: Semi-finals
- Most runs: Virender Sehwag (569) (Note: These statistics do not cover practice matches or matches abandoned without a toss.)
- Most wickets: Morné Morkel (31)
- Most catches: Virender Sehwag, Irfan Pathan (8)
- Most wicket-keeping dismissals: Naman Ojha (20)

Delhi Daredevils (abbreviated as DD) is a franchise cricket team based in Delhi, India, which plays in the Indian Premier League (IPL). The team competed in the 2012 IPL and finished at the third place, thus qualified for the 2012 Champions League Twenty20 (CLT20). It topped the league and the group stage in the IPL and the CLT20 respectively; however, it failed to win any match in the playoffs.

After finishing last in the previous season, the Daredevils added players such as Mahela Jayawardene, Andre Russell, Kevin Pietersen and Ross Taylor to the squad. Eric Simons succeeded Greg Shipperd as the head coach and T. A. Sekhar took the mentorship. The team won 11 of the 16 matches played in the league stage of the IPL and topped the point table. However, it lost both its two matches in the playoffs and finished at the third place. In the CLT20, they won two of its four group stage matches, while the other two were abandoned due to rain. It topped its group and reached the semi-final, where it lost to the Highveld Lions. Morné Morkel was the highest wicket-taker in the IPL, whereas skipper Virender Sehwag became the first batsman to score five consecutive fifties in the league. After the CLT20, the team released fourteen of its players, including Robin Bist, Aaron Finch and Venugopal Rao, signing Jesse Ryder, Johan Botha and Jeevan Mendis.

== Background ==
The Delhi Daredevils is a franchise cricket team based in Delhi, India which plays in the IPL. It is owned by the GMR Group, which bought it for US$84 million. It reached the IPL playoffs in the 2008 and the 2009 seasons, while topping the league stage in 2009. It had a "shocking performance" in the 2011 season, finishing at the last position. In the 2012 IPL auction, the team purchased Mahela Jayawardene for $1.4 million, Andre Russell for $450,000 and Doug Bracewell for $50,000. It got Kevin Pietersen and Ross Taylor from the Deccan Chargers and the Rajasthan Royals respectively in a transfer window, and it gave Andrew McDonald to the Royal Challengers Bangalore. It also released Ashok Dinda and James Hopes to the Pune Warriors India. It signed Pawan Negi, Manpreet Juneja and Kuldeep Raval, dropping out Robert Frylinck, Sridharan Sriram, Vivek Yadav, Rajesh Pawar and Matthew Wade. Glenn Maxwell and Gulam Bodi were signed as the replacements for withdrawn players Travis Birt and Colin Ingram.

Before the season, Daredevils' head coach Greg Shipperd was replaced by Eric Simons, who was the previous assistant coach of the team and the then bowling coach of the India. T. A. Sekhar became the team mentor for the second time, after working with the Mumbai Indians in the previous two seasons. The theme song was also changed from Khelo Front Foot pe to Munday Dilli ke.

In her preview of the Daredevils for ESPNcricinfo, Sharda Ugra termed the buying of Pietersen and Jayawardene as the "repair work for the new season." She termed the team's middle order as a "perfect mixture: batsmen of calibre combining with the game's leading entertainers," and identified Virender Sehwag and Jayawardene as the key players.

== Squad ==
The following players made at least one appearance for the Daredevils in 2012. The age given is at the start of the team's first match of the year (5 April 2012).

Batsmen
Name	Nationality (Note: The information in the nationality column is according to ESPNcricinfo. This information may not necessarily reflect the player's birthplace or citizenship.)	Birth date	Batting style	Bowling style
Unmukt Chand	India	26 March 1993 (aged 19)	Right-handed	Right-arm off break
Aaron Finch	Australia	17 November 1986 (aged 25)	Right-handed	Left arm spin orthodox
Kevin Pietersen	England	27 June 1980 (aged 31)	Right-handed	Right arm off break
Mahela Jayawardene	Sri Lanka	27 May 1977 (aged 34)	Right-handed	Right arm medium
Venugopal Rao	India	26 February 1982 (aged 30)	Right-handed	Right arm off break
Virender Sehwag (captain)	India	20 October 1978 (aged 33)	Right-handed	Right arm off break
Ross Taylor	New Zealand	8 March 1984 (aged 28)	Right-handed	Right arm off break
David Warner	Australia	27 October 1986 (aged 25)	Left-handed	Right-arm leg break

All-rounders
Name	Nationality	Birth date	Batting style	Bowling style
Glenn Maxwell	Australia	14 October 1988 (aged 23)	Right-handed	Right-arm off break
Yogesh Nagar	India	6 November 1990 (aged 21)	Right-handed	Right-arm off break
Irfan Pathan	India	27 October 1984 (aged 27)	Left-handed	Left-arm medium-fast
Andre Russell	West Indies	29 April 1988 (aged 23)	Right-handed	Right arm fast
Roelof van der Merwe	South Africa	31 December 1984 (aged 27)	Right-handed	Slow left arm orthodox

Wicket-keepers
Name	Nationality	Birth date	Batting style	Bowling style
Naman Ojha	India	20 July 1983 (aged 28)	Right-handed	—

Bowlers
Name	Nationality	Birth date	Batting style	Bowling style
Varun Aaron	India	29 October 1989 (aged 22)	Right-handed	Right-arm fast
Ajit Agarkar	India	4 December 1977 (aged 34)	Right-handed	Right-arm fast-medium
Doug Bracewell	New Zealand	28 September 1990 (aged 21)	Right-handed	Right-arm fast-medium
Sunny Gupta	India	27 September 1988 (aged 23)	Right-handed	Right-arm off break
Morné Morkel	South Africa	6 October 1984 (aged 27)	Left-handed	Right-arm fast
Shahbaz Nadeem	India	12 August 1989 (aged 22)	Right-handed	Slow left arm orthodox
Pawan Negi	India	6 January 1993 (aged 19)	Left-handed	Slow left arm orthodox
Umesh Yadav	India	25 October 1987 (aged 24)	Right-handed	Right-arm fast

== Indian Premier League ==
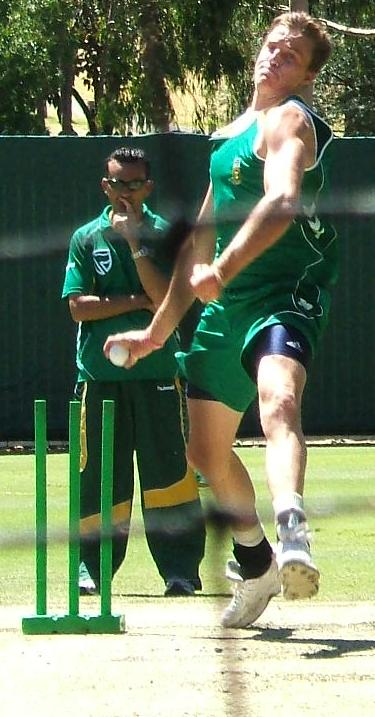
Morné Morkel was awarded the Purple cap for taking the most wickets in the 2012 IPL.

The Daredevils finished in third place in the 2012 IPL, which was "another season of dominance at the league stage ended without a win in the playoffs." After a disappointing season in 2011, the 2012 IPL saw a return of the Daredevils to being one of the more consistent IPL teams. Ugra said that despite having Virender Sehwag and David Warner as the openers, bowler Morné Morkel was the key player in the tournament, and Umesh Yadav was a nice assistant for him. Shahbaz Nadeem acted as a "tidy option" for a team which lacked spinners. Venugopal Rao, brought for $700,000, was termed as a "flop buy" by Ugra. Rao made 122 runs in ten matches, and had a strike-rate lower than 104. The team was captained by Sehwag, with Jayawardene acting as the stand-in captain in two matches.

The Daredevils topped the points table in the league stage, in which they won 11 out of 16 matches. They played its first match against the Kolkata Knight Riders, and won by eight wickets. This was followed by a 20-run loss against the Royal Challengers Bangalore. It won its next match against the Chennai Super Kings by eight wickets, and then in the "battle of the heavyweights", aggressive bowling by the Daredevils earned it a win against the Mumbai Indians. In the match against the Deccan Chargers, it got a five-wickets victory, and Pietersen played a 103-run innings. This was followed by two matches against the Pune Warriors India; it lost the first by 20 runs, and won the second by eight wickets. Their next match against Mumbai saw a 37-run victory for the squad. Then in the match against the Rajasthan Royals, Morkel's "sensational penultimate over" gave the Daredevils a one-run victory, and also saw Sehwag becoming the only player to make four consecutive half-centuries in the IPL. The team's next fixture was also against the Royals, which was a six-wicket win. Sehwag scored 73 runs from 38 balls, extending his record to five consecutive fifties. In the "clash between the two most impressive teams in the tournament," the Knight Riders beat the Daredevils by six wickets. This caused the Daredevils to lose the top spot in the points table, a position it had held "virtually from the start of the tournament". In its next game, a ton by David Warner and a half-century by Naman Ojha led the team to a nine wickets win, and it regained the top spot. Then "came a cropper on a lively pitch", as the Daredevils lost to the Super Kings by nine wickets. It became the first team to get into the playoffs when it registered a five wickets win against the Kings XI Punjab. Against the Royal Challengers Bangalore, it faced a 204-runs partnership between Chris Gayle and Virat Kohli, the second best in Twenty20, and lost the match by 21 runs. It finished its league stage campaign with a six wickets win over the Kings XI.

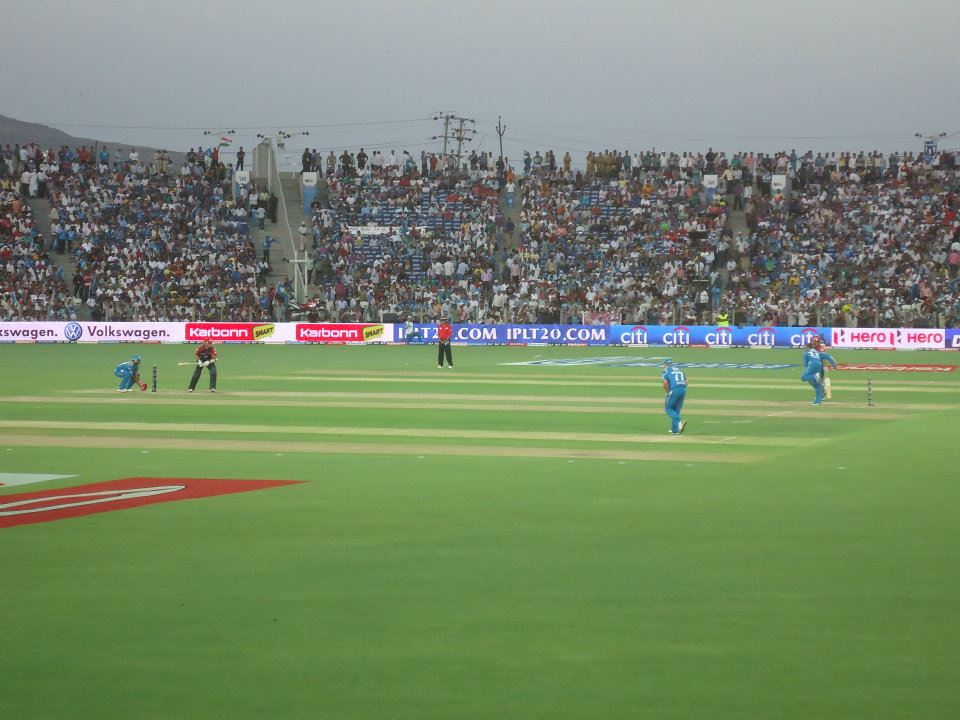
The Daredevils playing against the Warriors at the Subrata Roy Sahara Stadium, Pune. Played on 24 April, this match was won by the Daredevils by 8 wickets.

The Daredevils played the first qualifier against the Knight Riders. The winner of this match qualified for the final, whereas the loser got another chance to get to it. The Knight Riders scored 162 runs for four wickets, 56 of which came in the last four overs. Irfan Pathan, Yadav and Negi each got one wicket, whereas Varun Aaron conceded 48 runs in four overs. Chasing the total, the Daredevils lost its openers Warner and Sehwag at seven and ten runs respectively. Ojha made 28 runs, whereas Rao scored 13 runs off 22 balls. Some economical overs and Rao's struggle forced Jayawardene to attack, which eventually resulted in him getting out at 40. When the team required 55 runs off 32 balls, Negi was sent in before Taylor. Taylor later hit a six on the third ball he faced from Sunil Narine, "but it was too late by then." The Daredevils managed to score 144 runs for eight wickets, losing the match by 18 runs. In the second qualifier against the Super Kings, Morkel was benched, a decision which made a "significant difference". "Virtually unknown offspinner" Sunny Gupta made his IPL debut in the match, and this was "one of the biggest tactical goof-ups in IPL history." Murali Vijay scored a century for the Super Kings, and it reached to a total of 222. Gupta conceded 47 runs in his three overs; Aaron gave 63 in his four overs: the least economical bowling figure in IPL. The match also saw, for the first time in the season, Sehwag not opening for the Daredevils. Warner went for three runs, whereas Sehwag scored one run off six balls. Jayawardene made a half-century, and Taylor made 24 runs. Wickets felt at regular intervals, and the Daredevils eventually got all out at 136 runs, registering the biggest loss of the season. After the match, coach Simons clarified that Morkel was dropped to an allrounder in the form of Russell. Morkel was later awarded the Purple cap for claiming the most number of wickets in the tournament., for claiming the most wickets in the tournament: 25.

=== Season standings ===
Pos	Team	Pld	W	L	NR	Pts	NRR
1	Delhi Daredevils (3rd)	16	11	5	0	22	0.617
2	Kolkata Knight Riders (C)	16	10	5	1	21	0.561
3	Mumbai Indians (4th)	16	10	6	0	20	−0.100
4	Chennai Super Kings (RU)	16	8	7	1	17	0.100
5	Royal Challengers Bangalore	16	8	7	1	17	−0.022
6	Kings XI Punjab	16	8	8	0	16	−0.216
7	Rajasthan Royals	16	7	9	0	14	0.201
8	Deccan Chargers	16	4	11	1	9	−0.509
9	Pune Warriors India	16	4	12	0	8	−0.551

- The top four teams qualified for the playoffs
- C refers to the eventual winners of the tournament, RU to the runners-up

=== Match logs and statistics ===
Match logs
No.	Stage	Date	Opponents	Venue	Result
1	League stage	5 April	Kolkata Knight Riders	Eden Gardens, Kolkata	Won by 8 wickets
2	League stage	7 April	Royal Challengers Bangalore	M. Chinnaswamy Stadium, Bangalore	Lost by 20 runs
3	League stage	10 April	Chennai Super Kings	Feroz Shah Kotla Ground, Delhi	Won by 8 wickets
4	League stage	16 April	Mumbai Indians	Wankhede Stadium, Mumbai	Won by 7 wickets
5	League stage	19 April	Deccan Chargers	Feroz Shah Kotla Ground, Delhi	Won by 5 wickets
6	League stage	21 April	Pune Warriors India	Feroz Shah Kotla Ground, Delhi	Lost by 20 runs
7	League stage	24 April	Pune Warriors India	Subrata Roy Sahara Stadium, Pune	Won by 8 wickets
8	League stage	27 April	Mumbai Indians	Feroz Shah Kotla Ground, Delhi	Won by 37 runs
9	League stage	29 April	Rajasthan Royals	Feroz Shah Kotla Ground, Delhi	Won by 1 run
10	League stage	1 May	Rajasthan Royals	Sawai Mansingh Stadium, Jaipur	Won by 6 wickets
11	League stage	7 May	Kolkata Knight Riders	Feroz Shah Kotla Ground, Delhi	Lost by 6 wickets
12	League stage	10 May	Deccan Chargers	Rajiv Gandhi International Stadium, Hyderabad	Won by 9 wickets
13	League stage	12 May	Chennai Super Kings	M. A. Chidambaram Stadium, Chennai	Lost by 9 wickets
14	League stage	15 May	Kings XI Punjab	Feroz Shah Kotla Ground, Delhi	Won by 5 wickets
15	League stage	17 May	Royal Challengers Bangalore	Feroz Shah Kotla Ground, Delhi	Lost by 21 runs
16	League stage	19 May	Kings XI Punjab	HPCA Stadium, Dharamshala	Won by 6 wickets
17	Qualifier	22 May	Kolkata Knight Riders	Subrata Roy Sahara Stadium, Pune	Lost by 18 runs
18	Qualifier	25 May	Chennai Super Kings	M. A. Chidambaram Stadium, Chennai	Lost by 86 runs

Batting averages
Player	Matches	Innings	Runs	Average	Strike rate	Highest score	100s	50s
Kevin Pietersen	8	8	305	61.00	147.34	103*	1	1
David Warner	8	8	256	36.57	164.10	109*	1	1
Virender Sehwag	16	16	495	33.00	161.23	87*	0	5
Yogesh Nagar	13	8	153	30.60	115.03	44*	0	0
Mahela Jayawardene	16	15	335	27.91	112.41	56*	0	3
Irfan Pathan	17	12	176	25.14	139.68	42*	0	0
Naman Ojha	18	16	255	23.18	113.83	64*	0	1
Venugopal Rao	10	7	132	22.00	112.41	36	0	0
Ross Taylor	12	12	197	19.70	115.20	55	0	1
Qualification: 100 runs. Source: ESPNcricinfo

Bowling averages
Player	Matches	Overs	Wickets	Average	Economy	BBI	4wi
Morné Morkel	15	63.0	25	18.12	7.19	4/20	1
Pawan Negi	8	22.0	7	21.71	6.90	4/18	1
Umesh Yadav	17	61.0	19	23.84	7.42	3/19	0
Roelof van der Merwe	3	10.0	2	30.00	6.00	2/28	0
Varun Aaron	8	31.0	8	33.87	8.74	2/19	0
Shahbaz Nadeem	12	45.0	8	39.75	7.06	3/16	0
Ajit Agarkar	4	14.2	3	44.66	9.34	2/27	0
Irfan Pathan	17	60.0	8	58.12	7.75	2/46	0
Andre Russell	4	16.0	1	161.00	10.06	1/51	0
Qualification: 10 overs. Source: ESPNcricinfo

== Champions League Twenty20 ==
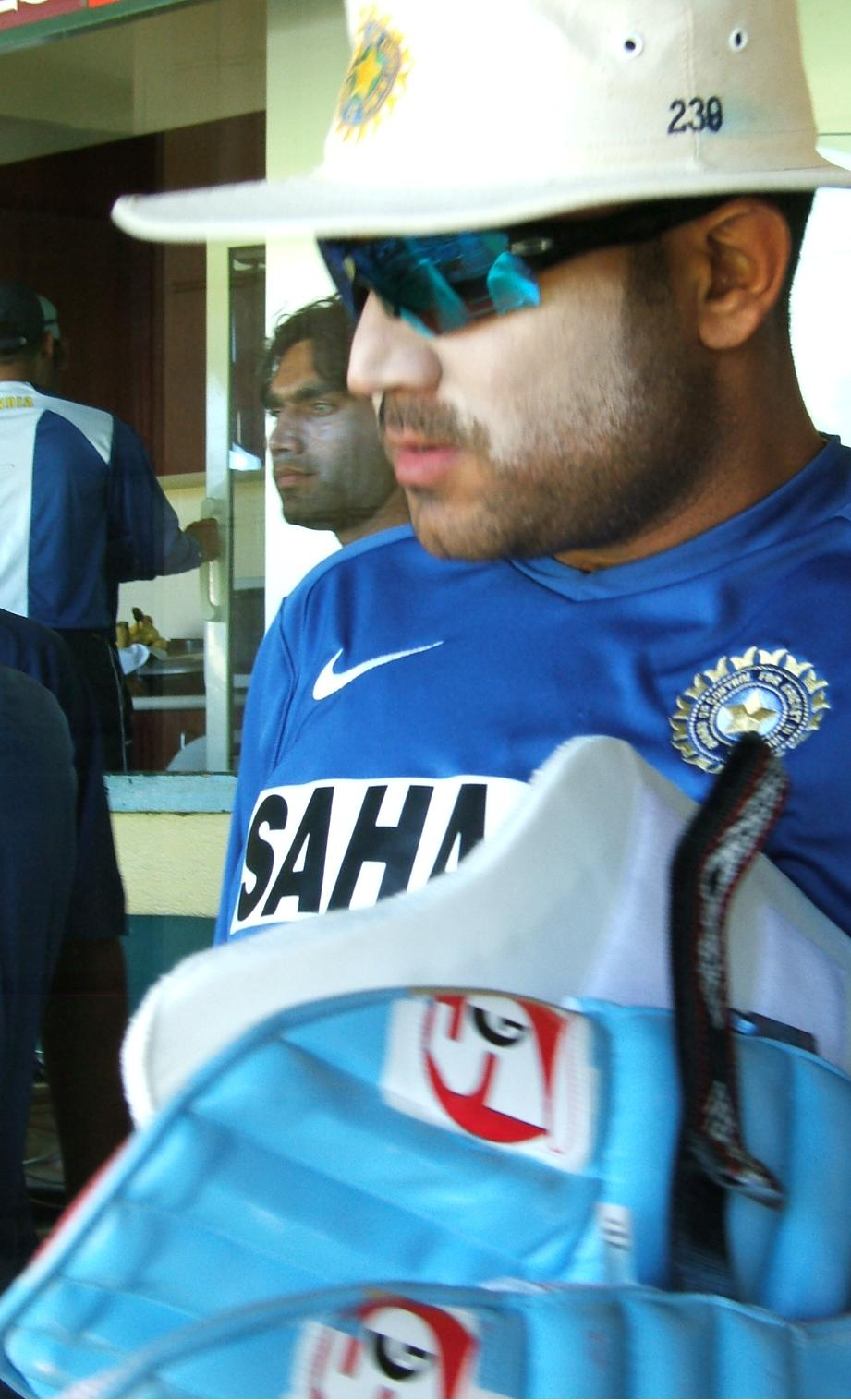
Sehwag, who gave up the captaincy prior to the CLT20, was initially doubtful for the tournament due to injury.

By finishing third in the IPL, the Daredevils qualified for the 2012 CLT20. Before the tournament, Morkel decided to play for the Daredevils and not for his home team the Titans. The franchise changed the team captain to Jayawardene as per the suggestion of Sehwag, who wanted to be "relieved of the responsibility" in order to "bat freely". Aavishkar Salvi came in as a replacement for Aaron, who was going to go through tonsillectomy. Sehwag strained a ligament during the 2012 ICC World Twenty20, due to which he was initially doubtful for the CLT20; however he recovered from the injury and played in the tournament. In his preview for ESPNcricinfo, Sidharth Monga said that the team had "some of the best names Twenty20 cricket can throw up." He termed Morkel as the key player and Unmukt Chand as the "surprise package". However, he said that the team's failure in big-matches and lack of spinners were its weaknesses. The team had a practice match with the Sydney Sixers, which it lost by 5 wickets.

Directly qualifying to the group stage, two of the four group matches of the Daredevils were abandoned due to rain. It played its first match with the Knight Riders, and won it by 52 runs. The Daredevils' innings ended at 160 runs for eight wickets, and Chand emerged as the top-scorer with 40 runs. In response, the Knight Riders got all out for 108 runs; Yadav, Ajit Agarkar and Morkel took two wickets each. The match against the Auckland Aces was abandoned due to rain. Playing against the Perth Scorchers, the Daredevils restricted its opponent to 121 runs, "a score which is rarely defended in Twenty20 cricket." Morkel took three wickets for 19 runs, and the team's "four-pronged pace attack was at its best." Chasing the total, only Sehwag, who made 52 runs, could reach the double figures among the top order. However Agarkar's 11 runs from seven balls helped the team eventually win the match. For the last league match against the Titans, Jayawardene was replaced by Warner and Taylor was appointed as the captain. However the match was abandoned due to rain. In the semi-final, the Daredevils played against the Highveld Lions. It again rested Jayawardene to make space for Warner. The bowlers restricted Lions to 139 runs; Yadav took two wickets conceding 20 runs. Batting second, the Daredevils lost its openers early, and no other specialist batsman, except Pietersen, was able to reach a double figure. Pietersen scored a half-century, while Morkel remained not out at 18 runs. The team managed to score 117 run for nine wickets and lost the match by 22 runs. After the match, Taylor cited that the team's fielding was one of the reasons for the loss.

=== Season standings ===
Key: Pld = Played, W = Wins, L = Losses, NR = No result, Pts = Points, NRR = Net run rate.

Group A
Team	Pld	W	L	NR	Pts	NRR
Delhi Capitals*	4	2	0	2	12	+1.440
Titans*	4	2	1	1	10	−0.017
Kolkata Knight Riders^{†}	4	1	2	1	6	+0.488
Perth Scorchers^{†}	4	1	2	1	6	−0.474
Auckland Aces^{†}	4	1	2	1	6	−0.963

Notes:
Teams marked * progressed to the next stage of the competition.
Teams marked † were eliminated from the competition.

=== Match logs and statistics ===
Practice Match
Date	Opponent	Venue	Result
11 October	Sydney Sixers	SuperSport Park, Centurion	Lost by 5 wickets

Match logs
No.	Stage	Date	Opponents	Venue	Result
1	Group A	13 October	Kolkata Knight Riders	SuperSport Park, Centurion	Won by 52 runs
2	Group A	19 October	Auckland Aces	Kingsmead, Durban	Abandoned due to rain
3	Group A	21 October	Perth Scorchers	Newlands, Cape Town	Won by 3 wickets
4	Group A	23 October	Titans	SuperSport Park, Centurion	No result (Note: This match is regarded as played under the International Cricket Council regulations since the toss was made.)
5	Semi-final	25 October	Highveld Lions	Kingsmead, Durban	Lost by 22 runs

Batting averages
Player	Matches	Innings	Runs	Average	Strike rate	Highest score	50s
Virender Sehwag	4	3	74	24.66	119.35	52	1
Kevin Pietersen	4	3	73	24.33	102.81	50	1
Unmukt Chand	4	3	52	17.33	98.11	40	0
Ross Taylor	4	3	42	14.00	113.51	36	0
Qualification: 40 runs. Source: ESPNcricinfo

Bowling averages
Player	Matches	Overs	Wickets	Average	Economy	BBI
Morné Morkel	4	12.0	6	12.66	6.33	3/19
Umesh Yadav	4	12.0	4	14.25	4.75	2/13
Ajit Agarkar	4	12.0	4	15.75	5.25	2/14
Irfan Pathan	4	11.0	2	33.00	6.00	2/19
Pawan Negi	4	9.0	1	51.00	5.66	1/21
Qualification: 5 overs. Source: ESPNcricinfo

== Reaction ==
Daredevils released fourteen of its players for 2013 IPL. This release included Robin Bist, Bodi, Bracewell, Aaron Finch, Sunny Gupta, Maxwell, Salvi and Rao. It signed Kedar Jadhav for ₹2 million (US$21,000). Later in the year, the franchise also started Fastrax Daredevils School Cup, an Inter-School Twenty20 tournament. The franchise, under its "Dare to Care" campaign, launched the website The Cheer-O-Meter. The campaign, supported by UNICEF India, is meant to protect the right of adolescent girls facing "various forms of discrimination, exploitation and abuse".

In the 2013 auction, the Daredevils signed Jesse Ryder, Johan Botha and Jeevan Mendis. Mushtaq Ahmed and Jeremy Snape were appointed as the bowling consultant and performance coach respectively. The team also signed Muralidharen Gautam and exchanged Taylor for Ashish Nehra, who was a part of the Warriors.

== See also ==
- List of Delhi Daredevils cricketers
- List of Indian Premier League records and statistics
- List of Indian Premier League centuries
- List of Indian Premier League five-wicket hauls
