= 2012 Deccan Chargers season =

Indian cricket team season

Deccan Chargers
2012 season
- Coach: Darren Lehmann
- Captain: Kumar Sangakkara; Cameron White (Note: Cameron White acted as the captain in the first match as Sangakkara left the squad on the national duty for the England tour of Sri Lanka.)
- Ground(s): Rajiv Gandhi International Cricket Stadium, Hyderabad (Capacity: 55,000) (Note: Only four home-matches of the Deccan Chargers for the 2012 IPL were conducted in Hyderabad and the rest were shifted to the multiple stadiums.)
- IPL: Group Stage (8th)
- Most runs: Shikhar Dhawan (569)
- Most wickets: Dale Steyn (18)
- Most catches: JP Duminy (6); Daniel Christian (6)
- Most wicket-keeping dismissals: Kumar Sangakkara (9)

The Deccan Chargers (DC) were a franchise cricket team based in Hyderabad, India, that competed in the Indian Premier League (IPL), a professional Twenty20 cricket (T20) league in India. They were one of the nine teams that competed in the 2012 Indian Premier League, making their fifth appearance in all IPL tournaments. The team was captained by Kumar Sangakkara and coached by Darren Lehmann.

The Deccan Chargers started their campaign by losing their opening fixture of the IPL on 7 April against the Chennai Super Kings and failed to qualify for playoffs finishing eighth in the group stage. On 14 September 2012, the IPL governing council terminated the Deccan Chargers for breaching contract terms and put the Hyderabad franchise on auction. The bid was won by the Sun TV Network and the team was renamed as the Sunrisers Hyderabad.

== Player acquisition ==
Players retained: Akash Bhandari, Bharat Chipli, Daniel Christian, Shikhar Dhawan, Kedar Devdhar, JP Duminy, Ravi Teja Dwaraka, Manpreet Gony, Ishank Jaggi, Chris Lynn, Amit Mishra, Anand Rajan, Ashish Reddy, Kumar Sangakkara, Ankit Sharma, Ishant Sharma, Sunny Sohal, Dale Steyn, Rusty Theron, Cameron White, Arjun Yadav

Players released: Michael Lumb, Ishan Malhotra, Jaydev Shah

Players traded away: Harmeet Singh Bansal, Pragyan Ojha, Kevin Pietersen

Players acquired by trade: Abhishek Jhunjhunwala

Players added in the auction: Darren Bravo, Daniel Harris, Parthiv Patel

Uncapped players acquired: Sneha Kishore Chikkam, Tanmay Mishra, Syed Quadri, Akshath Reddy, Biplab Samantray, Veer Pratap Singh, Tanmay Srivastava, Sudhindra Taduri, Atchuta Rao Tekkami

Players who withdrew from the competition: Darren Bravo, Ishant Sharma

== Squad ==
- Players with international caps are listed in **bold**.
- **Year signed Year** is the season the player first signed for the team

Name	Nationality	Birth date	Batting style	Bowling style	Year signed	Notes
Batsmen
**Darren Bravo**	West Indies	6 February 1989 (aged 23)	Left-handed	Right-arm medium fast	2012	Overseas.
Bharat Chipli	India	27 January 1983 (aged 29)	Right-handed	Right-arm medium fast	2011	
**Shikhar Dhawan**	India	5 December 1985 (aged 26)	Left-handed	Right-arm off break	2011	
Ravi Teja Dwaraka	India	5 September 1988 (aged 23)	Right-handed	Right-arm leg break	2008	
Daniel Harris	Australia	31 December 1979 (aged 32)	Right-handed	Right-arm medium fast	2012	Overseas.
Ishank Jaggi	India	27 October 1989 (aged 22)	Right-handed	Right-arm leg break	2011	
Abhishek Jhunjhunwala	India	1 December 1982 (aged 29)	Right-handed	Right-arm off break	2012	
Chris Lynn	Australia	10 April 1990 (aged 21)	Right-handed	Slow left-arm orthodox	2011	Overseas.
Tanmay Mishra	India	22 December 1986 (aged 25)	Right-handed	Right-arm medium fast	2012	Registered as an uncapped Indian player.
Akshath Reddy	India	11 February 1991 (aged 21)	Right-handed	Right-arm leg break	2012	
Sunny Sohal	India	10 November 1987 (aged 24)	Right-handed	Right-arm leg break	2011	
Tanmay Srivastava	India	7 November 1989 (aged 22)	Left-handed	Right-arm medium fast	2012	
**Cameron White**	Australia	18 August 1983 (aged 28)	Right-handed	Right-arm leg break	2011	Overseas and Vice-captain.
Arjun Yadav	India	23 December 1981 (aged 30)	Right-handed	Right-arm off break	2008	
All-rounders
**Daniel Christian**	Australia	4 May 1983 (aged 28)	Right-handed	Right-arm medium fast	2011	Overseas.
**JP Duminy**	South Africa	14 April 1984 (aged 27)	Left-handed	Right-arm off break	2011	Overseas.
Syed Quadri	India	2 December 1981 (aged 30)	Right-handed	Right-arm off break	2012	
Ashish Reddy	India	24 February 1991 (aged 21)	Right-handed	Right-arm medium fast	2010	
Biplab Samantray	India	14 December 1988 (aged 23)	Right-handed	Right-arm medium fast	2012	
Wicket-keepers
Kedar Devdhar	India	14 December 1989 (aged 22)	Right-handed		2011	
**Parthiv Patel**	India	9 March 1985 (aged 27)	Left-handed		2012	
**Kumar Sangakkara**	Sri Lanka	27 October 1977 (aged 34)	Left-handed	Right-arm off break	2011	Overseas and Captain.
Bowlers
Akash Bhandari	India	10 June 1993 (aged 18)	Right-handed	Right-arm leg break	2011	
Sneha Kishore Chikkam	India	31 December 1993 (aged 18)	Right-handed	Slow left-arm orthodox	2012	
**Manpreet Gony**	India	4 January 1984 (aged 28)	Right-handed	Right-arm medium fast	2011	
**Amit Mishra**	India	24 November 1982 (aged 29)	Right-handed	Right-arm leg break	2011	
Anand Rajan	India	17 April 1987 (aged 24)	Right-handed	Right-arm medium fast	2011	
Ankit Sharma	India	20 April 1991 (aged 20)	Left-handed	Slow left-arm orthodox	2011	
**Ishant Sharma**	India	2 September 1988 (aged 23)	Right-handed	Right-arm medium fast	2011	Ruled out of IPL due to ankle surgery.
Veer Pratap Singh	India	3 May 1992 (aged 19)	Right-handed	Right-arm medium fast	2012	
**Dale Steyn**	South Africa	27 June 1983 (aged 28)	Right-handed	Right-arm fast	2011	Overseas.
Sudhindra Taduri	India	24 April 1984 (aged 27)	Left-handed	Right-arm fast	2012	Suspended owing to the corruption allegations.
Atchuta Rao Tekkami	India	21 August 1986 (aged 25)	Left-handed	Left-arm medium fast	2012	
**Rusty Theron**	South Africa	24 June 1985 (aged 26)	Right-handed	Right-arm medium fast	2011	Overseas.

== Kit manufacturers and sponsors ==
Kit Manufacturers	Shirt Sponsor (Chest)	Shirt Sponsor (Back)	Chest Branding
Puma	Fly Emirates	Jaypee Cements	McDowell's No.1
Source :

T20 uniform

== Season overview ==
=== Standings ===
Pos	Team	Pld	W	L	NR	Pts	NRR
1	Delhi Daredevils (3rd)	16	11	5	0	22	0.617
2	Kolkata Knight Riders (C)	16	10	5	1	21	0.561
3	Mumbai Indians (4th)	16	10	6	0	20	−0.100
4	Chennai Super Kings (RU)	16	8	7	1	17	0.100
5	Royal Challengers Bangalore	16	8	7	1	17	−0.022
6	Kings XI Punjab	16	8	8	0	16	−0.216
7	Rajasthan Royals	16	7	9	0	14	0.201
8	Deccan Chargers	16	4	11	1	9	−0.509
9	Pune Warriors India	16	4	12	0	8	−0.551

- The top four teams qualified for the playoffs
- C refers to the eventual winners of the tournament, RU to the runners-up

=== Results by match ===
Round	1	2	3	4	5	6	7	8	9	10	11	12	13	14	15	16
Ground	H	H	A	A	H	A	A	A	H	A	A	H	H	A	H	H
Result	L	L	L	L	L	D	W	L	W	L	L	L	L	L	W	W

Source: Fixtures
A = Away; H = Home; W = Win; D = Draw; L = Loss

== Fixtures ==
All times are in Indian Standard Time (UTC+05:30)

=== Group stage ===
7 April	Chennai Super Kings; 193/6 (20 overs)	v	Deccan Chargers (H); 119 (17.1 overs)	Chennai Super Kings won by 74 runs
20:00 (D/N) Round 1 Scorecard	Chennai Super Kings; 193/6 (20 overs)	v	Deccan Chargers (H); 119 (17.1 overs)	ACA-VDCA Stadium, Visakhapatnam; Player of the match: Ravindra Jadeja (Chennai Super Kings)
20:00 (D/N) Round 1 Scorecard	Ravindra Jadeja 48 (29); Dale Steyn 2/25 (4 overs)		Cameron White 23 (16); Ravindra Jadeja 5/16 (4 overs)	ACA-VDCA Stadium, Visakhapatnam; Player of the match: Ravindra Jadeja (Chennai Super Kings)
Deccan Chargers won the toss and elected to field.				ACA-VDCA Stadium, Visakhapatnam; Player of the match: Ravindra Jadeja (Chennai Super Kings)

9 April	(H) Deccan Chargers; 138/9 (20 overs)	v	Mumbai Indians; 142/5 (20 overs)	Mumbai Indians won by 5 wickets
20:00 (D/N) Round 2 Scorecard	(H) Deccan Chargers; 138/9 (20 overs)	v	Mumbai Indians; 142/5 (20 overs)	ACA-VDCA Stadium, Visakhapatnam; Player of the match: Rohit Sharma (Mumbai Indians)
20:00 (D/N) Round 2 Scorecard	Shikhar Dhawan 41 (24); Munaf Patel 4/20 (4 overs)		Rohit Sharma 73* (50); Dale Steyn 3/12 (4 overs)	ACA-VDCA Stadium, Visakhapatnam; Player of the match: Rohit Sharma (Mumbai Indians)
Deccan Chargers won the toss and elected to bat.				ACA-VDCA Stadium, Visakhapatnam; Player of the match: Rohit Sharma (Mumbai Indians)

17 April	Deccan Chargers; 196/2 (20 overs)	v	Rajasthan Royals (H); 197/5 (19.4 overs)	Rajasthan Royals won by 5 wickets
16:00 (D/N) Round 3 Scorecard	Deccan Chargers; 196/2 (20 overs)	v	Rajasthan Royals (H); 197/5 (19.4 overs)	Sawai Mansingh Stadium, Jaipur; Player of the match: Brad Hodge (Rajasthan Royals)
16:00 (D/N) Round 3 Scorecard	JP Duminy 58* (26); Amit Mishra 3/32 (4 overs)		Brad Hodge 48* (21); Siddharth Trivedi 1/27 (4 overs)	Sawai Mansingh Stadium, Jaipur; Player of the match: Brad Hodge (Rajasthan Royals)
Deccan Chargers won the toss and elected to bat.				Sawai Mansingh Stadium, Jaipur; Player of the match: Brad Hodge (Rajasthan Royals)

19 April	Deccan Chargers; 157/8 (20 overs)	v	Delhi Daredevils (H); 162/5 (19.1 overs)	Delhi Daredevils won by 5 wickets
16:00 (D/N) Round 4 Scorecard	Deccan Chargers; 157/8 (20 overs)	v	Delhi Daredevils (H); 162/5 (19.1 overs)	Feroz Shah Kotla, Delhi; Player of the match: Kevin Pietersen (Delhi Daredevils)
16:00 (D/N) Round 4 Scorecard	Parthiv Patel 45 (27); Morné Morkel 3/23 (4 overs)		Kevin Pietersen 103* (64); Dale Steyn 2/19 (4 overs)	Feroz Shah Kotla, Delhi; Player of the match: Kevin Pietersen (Delhi Daredevils)
Deccan Chargers won the toss and elected to bat.				Feroz Shah Kotla, Delhi; Player of the match: Kevin Pietersen (Delhi Daredevils)

22 April	(H) Deccan Chargers; 126/7 (20 overs)	v	Kolkata Knight Riders; 127/5 (19 overs)	Kolkata Knight Riders won by 5 wickets
20:00 (D/N) Round 5 Scorecard	(H) Deccan Chargers; 126/7 (20 overs)	v	Kolkata Knight Riders; 127/5 (19 overs)	Barabati Stadium, Cuttack; Player of the match: Brett Lee (Kolkata Knight Riders)
20:00 (D/N) Round 5 Scorecard	Shikhar Dhawan 50 (50); Lakshmipathy Balaji 2/22 (4 overs)		Manoj Tiwary 30* (28); Dale Steyn 2/24 (4 overs)	Barabati Stadium, Cuttack; Player of the match: Brett Lee (Kolkata Knight Riders)
Kolkata Knight Riders won the toss and elected to field.; The match had a delayed start, but was not shortened.				Barabati Stadium, Cuttack; Player of the match: Brett Lee (Kolkata Knight Riders)

24 April	(H) Kolkata Knight Riders	v	Deccan Chargers	Match abandoned
20:00 (D/N) Round 6 Scorecard	(H) Kolkata Knight Riders	v	Deccan Chargers	Eden Gardens, Kolkata
Match abandoned without a toss due to rain.				Eden Gardens, Kolkata

26 April	Deccan Chargers; 177/4 (20 overs)	v	Pune Warriors India (H); 159/7 (20 overs)	Deccan Chargers won by 18 runs
20:00 (D/N) Round 7 Scorecard	Deccan Chargers; 177/4 (20 overs)	v	Pune Warriors India (H); 159/7 (20 overs)	Subrata Roy Sahara Stadium, Pune; Player of the match: Cameron White (Deccan Chargers)
20:00 (D/N) Round 7 Scorecard	Cameron White 78 (46); Bhuvneshwar Kumar 1/34 (4 overs)		Robin Uthappa 29 (27); Ashish Reddy 2/32 (4 overs)	Subrata Roy Sahara Stadium, Pune; Player of the match: Cameron White (Deccan Chargers)
Deccan Chargers won the toss and elected to bat.				Subrata Roy Sahara Stadium, Pune; Player of the match: Cameron White (Deccan Chargers)

29 April	Deccan Chargers; 100 (18.4 overs)	v	Mumbai Indians (H); 101/5 (18.1 overs)	Mumbai Indians won by 5 wickets
20:00 (D/N) Round 8 Scorecard	Deccan Chargers; 100 (18.4 overs)	v	Mumbai Indians (H); 101/5 (18.1 overs)	Wankhede Stadium, Mumbai; Player of the match: Dale Steyn (Deccan Chargers)
20:00 (D/N) Round 8 Scorecard	Shikhar Dhawan 29 (32); Lasith Malinga 4/16 (3.4 overs)		Rohit Sharma 42 (48); Dale Steyn 2/10 (4 overs)	Wankhede Stadium, Mumbai; Player of the match: Dale Steyn (Deccan Chargers)
Mumbai Indians won the toss and elected to field.				Wankhede Stadium, Mumbai; Player of the match: Dale Steyn (Deccan Chargers)

1 May	(H) Deccan Chargers; 186/4 (20 overs)	v	Pune Warriors India; 173/5 (20 overs)	Deccan Chargers won by 13 runs
16:00 (D/N) Round 9 Scorecard	(H) Deccan Chargers; 186/4 (20 overs)	v	Pune Warriors India; 173/5 (20 overs)	Barabati Stadium, Cuttack; Player of the match: Kumar Sangakkara (Deccan Chargers)
16:00 (D/N) Round 9 Scorecard	Kumar Sangakkara 82 (52); Wayne Parnell 1/25 (4 overs)		Steve Smith 47* (27); Ankit Sharma 1/9 (2 overs)	Barabati Stadium, Cuttack; Player of the match: Kumar Sangakkara (Deccan Chargers)
Deccan Chargers won the toss and elected to bat.				Barabati Stadium, Cuttack; Player of the match: Kumar Sangakkara (Deccan Chargers)

4 May	(H) Chennai Super Kings; 160/6 (20 overs)	v	Deccan Chargers; 150/5 (20 overs)	Chennai Super Kings won by 10 runs
20:00 (D/N) Round 10 Scorecard	(H) Chennai Super Kings; 160/6 (20 overs)	v	Deccan Chargers; 150/5 (20 overs)	M. A. Chidambaram Stadium, Chennai; Player of the match: Suresh Raina (Chennai Super Kings)
20:00 (D/N) Round 10 Scorecard	Francois du Plessis 42 (35); Veer Pratap Singh 2/35 (3 overs)		Cameron White 77 (53); Suresh Raina 1/5 (1 over)	M. A. Chidambaram Stadium, Chennai; Player of the match: Suresh Raina (Chennai Super Kings)
Chennai Super Kings won the toss and elected to bat.				M. A. Chidambaram Stadium, Chennai; Player of the match: Suresh Raina (Chennai Super Kings)

6 May	Deccan Chargers; 181/2 (20 overs)	v	Royal Challengers Bangalore (H); 185/5 (18.5 overs)	Royal Challengers Bangalore won by 5 wickets
20:00 (D/N) Round 11 Scorecard	Deccan Chargers; 181/2 (20 overs)	v	Royal Challengers Bangalore (H); 185/5 (18.5 overs)	M. Chinnaswamy Stadium, Bangalore; Player of the match: AB de Villiers (Royal Challengers Bangalore)
20:00 (D/N) Round 11 Scorecard	Shikhar Dhawan 73* (52); Prasanth Parameswaran 1/45 (4 overs)		Tillakaratne Dilshan 71 (54); Amit Mishra 2/28 (4 overs)	M. Chinnaswamy Stadium, Bangalore; Player of the match: AB de Villiers (Royal Challengers Bangalore)
Royal Challengers Bangalore won the toss and elected to field.				M. Chinnaswamy Stadium, Bangalore; Player of the match: AB de Villiers (Royal Challengers Bangalore)

8 May	Kings XI Punjab; 170/5 (20 overs)	v	Deccan Chargers (H); 145/8 (20 overs)	Kings XI Punjab won by 25 runs
20:00 (D/N) Round 12 Scorecard	Kings XI Punjab; 170/5 (20 overs)	v	Deccan Chargers (H); 145/8 (20 overs)	Rajiv Gandhi International Cricket Stadium, Hyderabad; Player of the match: Mandeep Singh (Kings XI Punjab)
20:00 (D/N) Round 12 Scorecard	Mandeep Singh 75 (48); Ashish Reddy 2/39 (4 overs)		Daniel Harris 30 (29); David Hussey 2/2 (1 over)	Rajiv Gandhi International Cricket Stadium, Hyderabad; Player of the match: Mandeep Singh (Kings XI Punjab)
Deccan Chargers won the toss and elected to field.				Rajiv Gandhi International Cricket Stadium, Hyderabad; Player of the match: Mandeep Singh (Kings XI Punjab)

10 May	(H) Deccan Chargers; 187/4 (20 overs)	v	Delhi Daredevils; 193/1 (16.4 overs)	Delhi Daredevils won by 9 wickets
16:00 (D/N) Round 13 Scorecard	(H) Deccan Chargers; 187/4 (20 overs)	v	Delhi Daredevils; 193/1 (16.4 overs)	Rajiv Gandhi International Cricket Stadium, Hyderabad; Player of the match: David Warner (Delhi Daredevils)
16:00 (D/N) Round 13 Scorecard	Shikhar Dhawan 84 (49); Varun Aaron 2/30 (4 overs)		David Warner 109* (54); Shikhar Dhawan 1/27 (2 overs)	Rajiv Gandhi International Cricket Stadium, Hyderabad; Player of the match: David Warner (Delhi Daredevils)
Deccan Chargers won the toss and elected to bat.				Rajiv Gandhi International Cricket Stadium, Hyderabad; Player of the match: David Warner (Delhi Daredevils)

13 May	Deccan Chargers; 190/4 (20 overs)	v	Kings XI Punjab (H); 194/6 (20 overs)	Kings XI Punjab won by 4 wickets
20:00 (D/N) Round 14 Scorecard	Deccan Chargers; 190/4 (20 overs)	v	Kings XI Punjab (H); 194/6 (20 overs)	Punjab Cricket Association Stadium, Mohali, Chandigarh; Player of the match: David Hussey (Kings XI Punjab)
20:00 (D/N) Round 14 Scorecard	Shikhar Dhawan 71 (50); Azhar Mahmood 2/39 (4 overs)		David Hussey 65* (35); Dale Steyn 2/26 (4 overs)	Punjab Cricket Association Stadium, Mohali, Chandigarh; Player of the match: David Hussey (Kings XI Punjab)
Deccan Chargers won the toss and elected to bat.				Punjab Cricket Association Stadium, Mohali, Chandigarh; Player of the match: David Hussey (Kings XI Punjab)

18 May	Rajasthan Royals; 126/8 (20 overs)	v	Deccan Chargers (H); 128/5 (18.4 overs)	Deccan Chargers won by 5 wickets
20:00 (D/N) Round 15 Scorecard	Rajasthan Royals; 126/8 (20 overs)	v	Deccan Chargers (H); 128/5 (18.4 overs)	Rajiv Gandhi International Cricket Stadium, Hyderabad; Player of the match: Dale Steyn (Deccan Chargers)
20:00 (D/N) Round 15 Scorecard	Akshath Reddy 42 (35); Siddharth Trivedi 2/20 (4 overs)		Rahul Dravid 39 (36); Dale Steyn 2/16 (4 overs)	Rajiv Gandhi International Cricket Stadium, Hyderabad; Player of the match: Dale Steyn (Deccan Chargers)
Rajasthan Royals won the toss and elected to bat.				Rajiv Gandhi International Cricket Stadium, Hyderabad; Player of the match: Dale Steyn (Deccan Chargers)

20 May	(H) Deccan Chargers; 132/7 (20 overs)	v	Royal Challengers Bangalore; 123/9 (20 overs)	Deccan Chargers won by 9 runs
16:00 (D/N) Round 16 Scorecard	(H) Deccan Chargers; 132/7 (20 overs)	v	Royal Challengers Bangalore; 123/9 (20 overs)	Rajiv Gandhi International Cricket Stadium, Hyderabad; Player of the match: Dale Steyn (Deccan Chargers)
16:00 (D/N) Round 16 Scorecard	JP Duminy 74 (53); Vinay Kumar 3/22 (4 overs)		Virat Kohli 42 (40); Dale Steyn 3/8 (4 overs)	Rajiv Gandhi International Cricket Stadium, Hyderabad; Player of the match: Dale Steyn (Deccan Chargers)
Royal Challengers Bangalore won the toss and elected to field.				Rajiv Gandhi International Cricket Stadium, Hyderabad; Player of the match: Dale Steyn (Deccan Chargers)

== Statistics ==
Name	Mat	Runs	HS	Ave	SR	Wkts	BBI	Ave	Eco	Ct	St
JP Duminy	9	244	74	81.33	128.42	1	1/8	104.00	8.66	6	–
Cameron White	13	479	78	43.54	149.68	0	–	–	9.00	3	–
Shikhar Dhawan	15	569	84	40.64	129.61	3	1/8	18.33	9.16	5	–
Daniel Christian	7	145	39	29.00	122.88	8	2/26	29.12	8.62	6	–
Daniel Harris	4	111	47	27.75	109.90	0	–	–	8.66	2	–
Akshath Reddy	5	73	42	24.33	123.72	–	–	–	–	0	–
Kumar Sangakkara	12	200	82	18.18	108.69	–	–	–	–	9	0
Parthiv Patel	14	194	45	17.63	117.57	–	–	–	–	5	1
Bharat Chipli	5	37	25*	12.33	105.71	–	–	–	–	1	–
Abhishek Jhunjhunwala	5	24	19	12.00	92.30	1	1/13	38.00	6.33	2	–
Ashish Reddy	9	35	10*	8.75	120.68	11	3/25	21.54	8.72	0	–
Ishank Jaggi	3	15	10*	7.50	71.42	–	–	–	–	1	–
Ankit Sharma	9	18	15	6.00	138.46	4	1/9	41.25	6.82	0	–
Chris Lynn	1	6	6	6.00	66.66	–	–	–	–	1	–
Amit Mishra	14	16	8*	5.33	80.00	13	3/32	29.00	8.02	1	–
Manpreet Gony	6	4	4	4.00	50.00	3	1/26	69.00	8.62	1	–
Dale Steyn	12	19	7	3.80	90.47	18	3/8	15.83	6.10	4	–
Ravi Teja Dwaraka	2	4	4	2.00	100.00	–	–	–	–	0	–
Veer Pratap Singh	9	0	0	0.00	0.00	10	2/31	29.60	8.70	0	–
Rusty Theron	2	7	7*	–	116.66	2	2/37	33.00	8.25	0	–
Biplab Samantray	1	2	2*	–	100.00	–	–	–	–	0	–
Sudhindra Taduri	3	0	0*	–	–	1	1/46	136.00	11.65	0	–
Anand Rajan	4	–	–	–	–	3	1/11	36.33	9.21	0	–
Tanmay Mishra	1	–	–	–	–	–	–	–	–	1	–

Source: 2012 IPL Statistics Full Table on ESPNcricinfo

== Awards and achievements ==
=== Awards ===
Man of the Match

No.	Date	Player	Opponent	Venue	Result	Contribution	Ref
1	26 April 2012	Cameron White	Pune Warriors India	Pune	Won by 18 runs	78 (46)	
2	29 April 2012	Dale Steyn	Mumbai Indians	Mumbai	Lost by 5 wickets	3 (5) & 2/10 (4 overs)	
3	1 May 2012	Kumar Sangakkara	Pune Warriors India	Cuttack	Won by 13 runs	82 (52)	
4	18 May 2012	Dale Steyn	Rajasthan Royals	Hyderabad	Won by 5 wickets	2/16 (4 overs)	
5	20 May 2012	Dale Steyn	Royal Challengers Bangalore	Hyderabad	Won by 9 runs	3/8 (4 overs)	

=== Achievements ===
- Best batting average in the 2012 IPL : JP Duminy (81.33)
- Most maiden overs bowled in the 2012 IPL : Dale Steyn (2)
- Fastest ball bowled in the 2012 IPL : Dale Steyn (154.40 km/h)

== Termination ==
Due to financial problems Deccan Chronicle Holdings Ltd, the team owner of Deccan Chargers announced a sale of their team by auction. The sale, announced in a newspaper advertisement on Thursday, was to be through a bidding process that was to be completed on 13 September, with the winning bid to be announced on the same day. However the auction for the franchise on 13 September 2012 ended with no results as the team's owners rejecting the sole bid they received from PVP Ventures. It was reported that Deccan Chargers owner rejected the bid by PVP ventures as DCHL's bankers were not happy with PVP's plan to divide the bid amount in two parts over the next ten years. Later on 14 September 2012, the IPL governing council terminated the Chargers for breaching contract terms. The Sun TV Network won the bid for the Hyderabad franchise, the BCCI confirmed on 25 October 2012. The new team was named the Sunrisers Hyderabad.
