= List of Delhi Capitals cricketers =

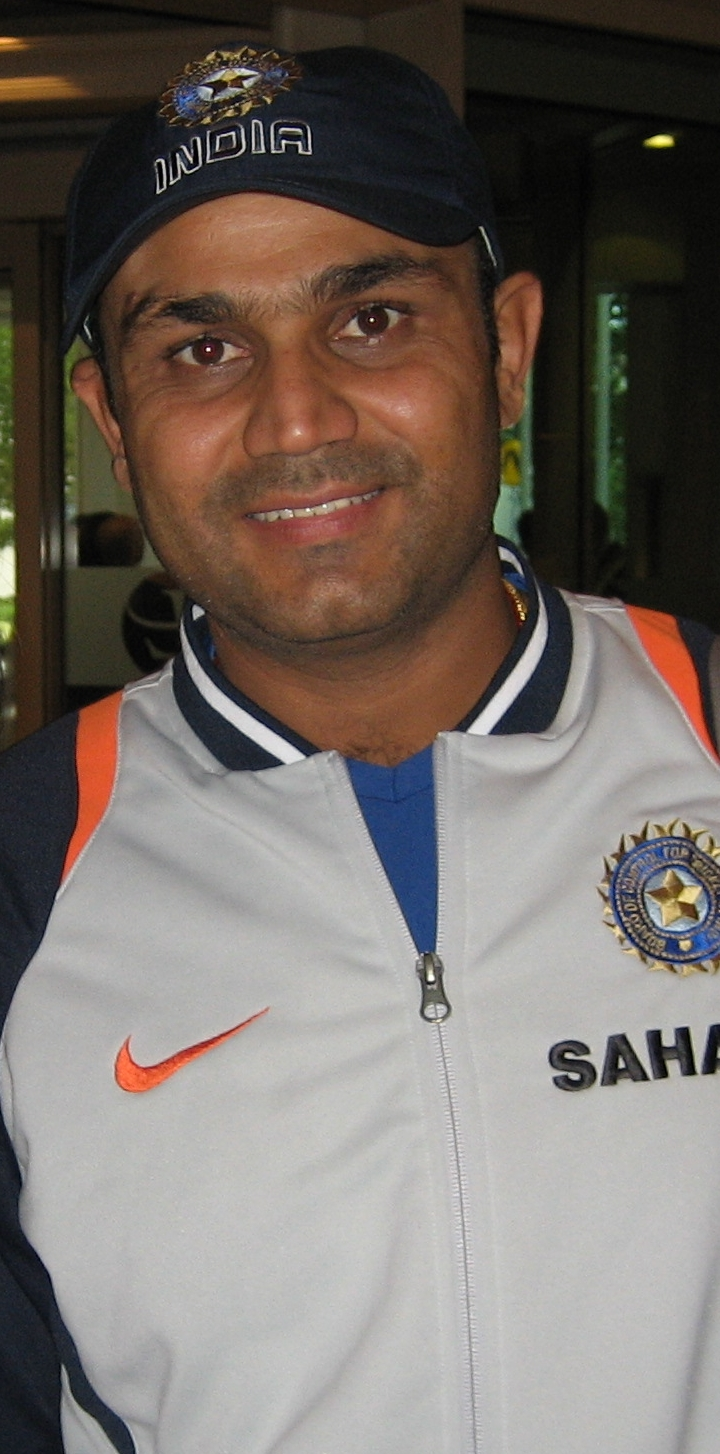
Virender Sehwag has represented Delhi Daredevils in 86 matches.

The Delhi Capitals are a franchise cricket team based in Delhi, India, and are one of the teams participating in the Indian Premier League (IPL). The Capitals played their first match in the first season of the IPL against the Rajasthan Royals. The Capitals reached the IPL playoffs three times, and have topped the group stage table twice. Their performances in the competition have resulted in their qualification for the 2009 and 2012 Champions League Twenty20, in which they reached the semi-finals on the second occasion. In total, 108 players have played for the Capitals, of whom Rishabh Pant has played the most matches: 111 since his debut for the franchise in 2016.

The leading run-scorer for the Capitals is Rishabh Pant with 3,284 runs. Rishabh Pant's innings of 128 not out against the Sunrisers Hyderabad in 2018 is the highest individual score in an innings by a Capitals batsman. David Warner and Shikhar Dhawan both have scored two centuries each for the Capitals, whereas Virender Sehwag, AB de Villiers, Kevin Pietersen, Quinton de Kock, Sanju Samson, and Rishabh Pant have scored one each. Albie Morkel has the team's best batting average: 86.00, though among batters who has scored more than 1,000 runs, JP Duminy has the best average with 44.13. (Note: Players like Doug Bracewell and Siddharth Kaul, who have been not out in all their innings for DD, are not considered because their batting average cannot be calculated.) Among Capitals's bowlers, Amit Mishra has taken more wickets than any other, with 106. The best bowling average is Tristan Stubbs's 5.00, though among bowlers who have bowled more than 20 overs, Farveez Maharoof has the best average with 19.26. Mishra has the best bowling figures in an innings: he got a five wicket haul against the Deccan Chargers in a 2008 match, while conceding only 17 runs. Rishabh Pant has taken the most catches as wicket-keeper for the Capitals, with 75, while also making the most stumpings: 23. Axar Patel has claimed the highest number of catches among fielders, taking 47.

== Players ==
Key

- § – Member of the current squad
- † – Captain
- ‡ – Wicket-keeper
- First – Year of Twenty20 debut for the Capitals
- Last – Year of latest Twenty20 match for the Capitals
- * – Batsman remained not out

Statistics are correct as of the Capitals's match against the Mumbai Indians at Arun Jaitley Cricket Stadium, New Delhi, 2026 IPL, 4 April 2026.
These statistics do not cover practice matches or matches abandoned without a toss.

The Capitals capped cricketers
General						Batting								Bowling				Fielding	
Name	Nationality (Note: The information in the nationality column is according to ESPNcricinfo. This information may not necessarily reflect the player's birthplace or citizenship.)	First	Last	Mat	Inn	NO	Runs	HS	100	50 (Note: A century made is not listed as an additional half century.)	Avg	SR	Balls (Note: This does not include illegal deliveries like no-balls and wides.)	Wkt	BBI (Note: The BBI has not been provided for those bowlers who have not taken any wicket while playing for RR.)	ER (Note: Average runs concede by bowlers while playing for RR.)	Ave	Ca	St
Shoaib Malik	Pakistan	2008	2008	7	5	1	52	24	0	0	13.00	110.64	51	2	1/6	10.00	42.50	5	0
Brett Geeves	Australia	2008	2008	2	0	0	–	–	0	0	–	–	48	1	1/50	11.38	91.00	3	0
Mohammad Asif	Pakistan	2008	2008	8	2	0	3	3	0	0	1.50	50.00	192	8	2/19	9.25	37.00	1	0
Glenn McGrath	Australia	2008	2009	16	3	2	4	4*	0	0	4.00	80.00	360	14	4/29	6.70	28.71	2	0
AB de Villiers ‡	South Africa	2008	2010	28	26	5	671	105*	1	3	31.95	117.31	0	–	–	–	–	22	0
Rajat Bhatia	India	2008	2010	26	15	3	95	21	0	0	7.91	106.74	410	20	4/15	7.55	25.80	6	0
Tillakaratne Dilshan ‡	Sri Lanka	2008	2010	31	30	4	615	67*	0	4	23.65	113.46	211	7	2/16	6.25	31.42	17	0
Farveez Maharoof	Sri Lanka	2008	2010	20	14	4	177	39	0	0	17.70	143.90	420	27	3/34	7.43	19.26	4	0
Yo Mahesh	India	2008	2010	13	5	3	15	6*	0	0	7.50	55.56	283	18	4/36	8.86	23.22	5	0
Mithun Manhas ‡	India	2008	2010	21	15	7	257	32*	0	0	32.12	104.89	0	–	–	–	–	8	0
Daniel Vettori	New Zealand	2008	2010	12	7	4	67	29	0	0	22.33	113.56	257	11	3/15	7.75	30.18	4	0
Pradeep Sangwan	India	2008	2010	30	10	5	19	6*	0	0	3.80	61.299	622	29	3/18	8.07	28.86	5	0
Virender Sehwag †	India	2008	2013	86	85	5	2382	119	1	17	29.40	158.16	136	6	2/18	10.36	39.17	30	0
Dinesh Karthik ‡ †	India	2008	2014	60	53	8	1128	69	0	7	25.06	126.03	0	–	–	–	–	31	15
Manoj Tiwary	India	2008	2015	27	22	7	355	61*	0	1	25.35	113.41	18	0	0/11	13.00	–	6	0
Gautam Gambhir †	India	2008	2018	50	48	4	1200	86	0	9	27.27	120.24	0	–	–	–	–	8	0
Shikhar Dhawan	India	2008	2021	63	63	10	2066	106*	2	16	38.98	131.01	0	–	–	–	–	27	0
Amit Mishra	India	2008	2021	103	34	17	200	31	0	0	11.76	83.33	2142	110	5/17	7.37	23.93	17	0
Owais Shah	England	2009	2009	4	4	1	74	39*	0	0	24.66	105.71	0	–	–	–	–	2	0
Dirk Nannes	Australia	2009	2010	26	2	1	4	3	0	0	4.00	30.76	592	31	4/24	6.84	21.77	5	0
Andrew McDonald	Australia	2009	2011	6	5	3	76	33*	0	0	38.00	120.63	114	5	2/37	9.63	36.60	0	0
Aavishkar Salvi	India	2009	2011	8	0	0	–	–	0	0	–	–	150	7	2/19	8.00	28.57	2	0
Yogesh Nagar	India	2009	2012	27	21	6	295	44*	0	0	19.66	106.49	81	6	2/9	9.92	22.33	6	0
Ashish Nehra	India	2009	2013	30	8	3	25	22*	0	0	5.00	86.20	667	36	3/26	7.41	22.88	6	0
David Warner †	Australia	2009	2024	91	90	8	2572	109*	2	22	31.36	135.36	0	–	–	–	–	40	0
Paul Collingwood	England	2010	2010	8	7	2	203	75*	0	3	40.60	130.13	89	5	2/19	6.81	20.20	4	0
Moises Henriques	Australia	2010	2010	1	1	0	11	11	0	0	11.00	220.00	24	1	1/35	8.75	35.00	1	0
Sarabjit Ladda	India	2010	2010	5	2	1	0	0*	0	0	–	0.00	90	4	2/44	9.53	35.75	0	0
Umesh Yadav	India	2010	2013	51	15	11	45	12*	0	0	11.25	80.35	1037	47	4/24	7.93	29.17	11	0
Kedar Jadhav ‡	India	2010	2015	41	37	14	566	63*	0	2	24.61	134.44	0	–	–	–	–	13	4
Travis Birt	Australia	2011	2011	5	5	0	75	27	0	0	15.00	129.31	0	–	–	–	–	0	0
Sridharan Sriram	India	2011	2011	1	1	0	4	4	0	0	4.00	57.14	6	0	0/25	25.00	–	0	0
Matthew Wade ‡	Australia	2011	2011	3	3	0	22	11	0	0	7.33	66.67	0	–	–	–	–	0	0
James Hopes †	Australia	2011	2011	10	8	3	196	55	0	2	39.20	124.05	192	7	1/25	8.50	38.86	3	0
Ashok Dinda	India	2011	2011	6	1	0	0	0	0	0	0.00	0.00	102	5	2/42	8.94	30.40	0	0
Aaron Finch	Australia	2011	2012	8	8	0	102	30	0	0	12.75	105.15	12	0	0/13	6.50	–	4	0
Varun Aaron	India	2011	2012	12	3	1	1	1	0	0	0.50	12.50	258	10	2/19	8.21	35.30	1	0
Unmukt Chand ‡	United States	2011	2013	17	16	0	248	41	0	0	15.50	96.49	0	–	–	–	–	7	0
Venugopal Rao	India	2011	2013	25	21	3	468	60	0	1	26.00	115.27	24	0	0/12	13.00	–	4	0
Irfan Pathan	India	2011	2013	50	40	15	490	44*	0	0	19.60	110.85	1009	31	3/28	7.47	40.54	16	0
Roelof van der Merwe	Netherlands	2011	2013	10	6	4	36	14	0	0	18.00	87.80	215	10	3/20	6.22	22.30	3	0
Ajit Agarkar	India	2011	2013	20	9	4	53	13	0	0	10.60	101.92	398	16	2/14	8.33	34.56	6	0
Morne Morkel	South Africa	2011	2013	41	16	7	118	23*	0	0	13.11	157.33	948	51	4/20	7.52	23.31	2	0
Naman Ojha ‡	India	2011	2018	39	36	7	438	64*	0	1	15.10	105.28	0	–	–	–	–	27	2
Shahbaz Nadeem	India	2011	2018	61	19	7	32	6	0	0	2.67	41.03	1205	40	3/16	7.37	37.00	14	0
Colin Ingram	South Africa	2011	2019	15	15	3	205	47	0	0	17.08	113.89	0	–	–	–	–	1	0
Doug Bracewell	New Zealand	2012	2012	1	1	1	12	12*	0	0	–	133.33	24	3	3/32	8.00	10.67	1	0
Sunny Gupta	India	2012	2012	1	1	0	0	0	0	0	0.00	0.00	18	0	0/47	15.67	–	0	0
Mahela Jayawardene †	Sri Lanka	2012	2013	33	32	3	691	66	0	5	23.82	108.47	0	–	–	–	–	11	0
Kevin Pietersen †	England	2012	2014	23	22	4	672	103*	1	3	37.33	131.50	60	0	0/16	8.90	–	7	0
Ross Taylor †	New Zealand	2012	2014	20	19	3	298	55	0	1	18.62	111.61	0	–	–	–	–	8	0
Andre Russell	West Indies	2012	2014	7	4	0	58	31	0	0	14.50	145.00	138	1	1/51	9.96	229.00	1	0
Pawan Negi	India	2012	2016	21	13	7	101	19*	0	0	16.83	100.00	264	9	4/18	7.15	35.00	4	0
Glenn Maxwell	Australia	2012	2018	14	14	1	175	47	0	0	13.46	133.59	114	6	2/22	8.11	25.67	4	0
Manprit Juneja	India	2013	2013	7	7	0	125	49	0	0	17.86	97.66	0	–	–	–	–	0	0
Bharat Chipli	India	2013	2013	1	1	0	16	16	0	0	16.00	88.89	0	–	–	–	–	0	0
Ben Rohrer	Australia	2013	2013	8	8	2	193	64*	0	1	32.17	137.86	6	0	0/12	12.00	–	3	0
Johan Botha	South Africa	2013	2013	6	6	0	43	23	0	0	7.17	82.69	100	5	2/11	6.54	21.80	5	0
Jeevan Mendis	Sri Lanka	2013	2013	3	3	0	23	12	0	0	7.67	85.19	30	1	1/16	7.20	36.00	2	0
Siddarth Kaul	India	2013	2014	11	2	2	9	7*	0	0	–	81.82	209	6	2/27	8.50	49.33	1	0
C. M. Gautam ‡	India	2013	2015	4	4	1	48	30	0	0	16.00	123.08	0	–	–	–	–	0	1
Wayne Parnell	South Africa	2014	2014	8	2	1	2	2	0	0	2.00	100.00	181	6	2/21	7.39	37.17	2	0
Murali Vijay	India	2014	2014	11	11	0	207	52	0	1	18.82	107.81	6	0	0/13	13.00	–	8	0
James Neesham	New Zealand	2014	2014	4	3	0	42	22	0	0	14.00	91.30	54	1	1/29	10.11	91.00	0	0
Laxmi Shukla	India	2014	2014	5	3	0	31	21	0	0	10.33	81.58	56	1	1/31	8.89	83.00	1	0
Rahul Sharma	India	2014	2014	2	0	0	–	–	0	0	–	–	36	1	1/33	10.83	65.00	0	0
Rahul Shukla	India	2014	2014	3	3	2	18	14	0	0	18.00	85.71	54	2	1/13	10.89	49.00	1	0
Jaydev Unadkat	India	2014	2015	10	2	1	1	1*	0	0	1.00	16.67	205	9	3/32	8.78	33.33	0	0
Mayank Agarwal	India	2014	2016	21	21	1	355	68	0	2	17.75	121.16	0	–	–	–	–	4	0
Quinton de Kock ‡	South Africa	2014	2016	23	23	1	720	108	1	5	32.73	134.83	0	–	–	–	–	4	2
JP Duminy †	South Africa	2014	2016	38	35	12	1015	78*	0	6	44.13	130.80	342	13	4/17	7.39	32.38	13	0
Nathan Coulter-Nile	Australia	2014	2016	17	8	4	29	7*	0	0	7.25	90.63	369	20	4/20	7.51	23.10	5	0
Imran Tahir	South Africa	2014	2016	20	5	1	18	5	0	0	4.50	78.26	434	29	4/28	8.61	21.48	3	0
Mohammed Shami	India	2014	2018	32	13	6	48	21	0	0	6.86	117.07	654	20	2/34	9.17	50.00	3	0
Saurabh Tiwary	India	2015	2015	7	6	6	109	28*	0	0	–	139.74	0	–	–	–	–	5	0
Yuvraj Singh	India	2015	2015	14	13	0	248	57	0	2	19.08	118.10	54	1	1/14	8.00	72.00	2	0
Albie Morkel	South Africa	2015	2015	4	3	2	86	73*	0	1	86.00	132.31	72	3	2/21	9.08	36.33	1	0
Gurinder Sandhu	Australia	2015	2015	3	0	0	–	–	0	0	–	–	48	1	1/33	10.25	82.00	1	0
Domnic Joseph	India	2015	2015	6	2	1	1	1	0	0	1.00	33.33	84	4	2/18	7.21	25.25	0	0
Jayant Yadav	India	2015	2017	10	2	0	6	5	0	0	3.00	60.00	180	4	1/8	6.53	49.00	2	0
Angelo Mathews	Sri Lanka	2015	2017	14	12	3	176	31	0	0	19.56	134.35	210	7	2/15	8.63	43.14	7	0
Zaheer Khan †	India	2015	2017	30	5	2	10	4	0	0	3.33	38.46	648	27	3/20	7.46	29.85	4	0
Shreyas Iyer †	India	2015	2021	87	87	12	2375	96	0	16	31.67	123.96	0	–	–	–	–	34	0
Sam Billings ‡	England	2016	2017	11	10	0	226	55	0	2	22.60	134.52	0	–	–	–	–	7	0
Sanju Samson ‡	India	2016	2017	28	28	3	677	102	1	3	27.08	127.26	0	–	–	–	–	7	1
Carlos Brathwaite	West Indies	2016	2017	10	8	0	95	34	0	0	11.88	179.25	175	8	3/47	8.78	32.00	3	0
Chris Morris	South Africa	2016	2019	34	26	11	427	82*	0	2	28.47	160.53	732	41	4/26	8.17	24.32	19	0
Rishabh Pant ‡ †	India	2016	2024	111	110	17	3284	128*	1	18	35.31	148.93	0	–	–	–	–	75	23
Karun Nair § †	India	2016	2025	36	32	2	836	89	0	5	26.97	131.03	0	–	–	–	–	7	0
Ankit Bawne	India	2017	2017	1	1	1	12	12*	0	0	–	100.00	0	–	–	–	–	0	0
Marlon Samuels	West Indies	2017	2017	5	4	0	29	27	0	0	7.25	93.55	18	0	0/12	11.33	–	1	0
Aditya Tare ‡	India	2017	2017	3	3	0	18	18	0	0	6.00	78.26	0	–	–	–	–	0	0
Corey Anderson	United States	2017	2017	11	11	4	142	41*	0	0	20.29	115.45	113	3	1/23	9.88	62.00	5	0
Pat Cummins	Australia	2017	2017	12	9	4	77	24	0	0	15.40	145.28	277	15	2/20	8.08	24.87	1	0
Kagiso Rabada	South Africa	2017	2021	50	18	8	138	44	0	0	13.80	102.99	1140	76	4/21	8.21	20.53	23	0
Jason Roy	England	2018	2018	5	5	1	120	91*	0	1	30.00	127.66	0	–	–	–	–	4	0
Abhishek Sharma	India	2018	2018	3	3	2	63	46*	0	0	63.00	190.91	0	–	–	–	–	1	0
Dan Christian	Australia	2018	2018	4	3	1	26	13	0	0	13.00	78.79	71	4	2/35	8.54	25.25	0	0
Vijay Shankar	India	2018	2018	13	11	7	212	54*	0	1	53.00	143.24	30	1	1/22	11.60	58.00	6	0
Junior Dala	South Africa	2018	2018	1	0	0	–	–	0	0	–	–	18	0	0/34	11.33	–	0	0
Liam Plunkett	England	2018	2018	7	2	1	1	1*	0	0	1.00	33.33	150	4	3/17	9.00	56.25	2	0
Colin Munro	New Zealand	2018	2019	9	9	0	147	40	0	0	16.33	132.43	0	–	–	–	–	2	0
Rahul Tewatia	India	2018	2019	13	9	5	76	24	0	0	19.00	116.92	170	8	3/18	7.59	26.88	8	0
Trent Boult	New Zealand	2018	2019	19	4	2	7	6	0	0	3.50	116.67	430	23	2/20	8.78	27.35	11	0
Sandeep Lamichhane	Nepal	2018	2019	9	1	0	0	0	0	0	0.00	0.00	210	13	3/36	8.34	22.46	2	0
Harshal Patel	India	2018	2020	12	6	2	81	36*	0	0	20.25	137.29	243	12	3/28	9.33	31.50	1	0
Avesh Khan	India	2018	2021	24	2	1	9	5	0	0	9.00	150.00	522	28	3/13	8.34	25.93	5	0
Prithvi Shaw §	India	2018	2024	79	79	0	1892	99	0	14	23.95	147.47	0	–	–	–	–	17	0
Sherfane Rutherford	West Indies	2019	2019	7	7	2	73	28*	0	0	14.60	135.19	41	1	1/6	8.63	59.00	5	0
Keemo Paul	West Indies	2019	2019	8	6	1	18	7	0	0	3.60	75.00	163	9	3/17	8.72	26.33	5	0
Hanuma Vihari	India	2019	2019	2	2	0	4	2	0	0	2.00	50.00	6	0	0/9	9.00	–	0	0
Ishant Sharma	India	2019	2024	34	6	6	12	10*	0	0	–	109.09	678	34	3/34	8.38	27.85	4	0
Axar Patel § †	India	2019	2026	96	74	22	1230	66	0	3	23.65	138.36	1938	69	3/21	7.18	33.62	52	0
Alex Carey ‡	Australia	2020	2020	3	3	1	32	14*	0	0	16.00	110.34	0	–	–	–	–	2	0
Daniel Sams	Australia	2020	2020	3	1	0	0	0	0	0	0.00	0.00	72	0	0/30	9.50	–	3	0
Tushar Deshpande	India	2020	2020	5	2	1	21	20*	0	0	21.00	175.00	102	3	2/37	11.29	64.00	1	0
Marcus Stoinis	Australia	2020	2021	27	24	6	441	65	0	3	24.50	142.72	245	15	3/26	9.80	26.67	5	0
Shimron Hetmyer	West Indies	2020	2021	26	24	9	427	53*	0	1	28.47	158.74	0	–	–	–	–	11	0
Ajinkya Rahane	India	2020	2021	11	9	0	121	60	0	1	13.44	105.22	0	–	–	–	–	4	0
Ravichandran Ashwin	India	2020	2021	28	11	5	81	20*	0	0	13.50	106.58	574	20	3/29	7.55	36.10	5	0
Praveen Dubey	India	2020	2023	4	2	1	23	16	0	0	23.00	69.70	66	1	1/19	8.27	91.00	1	0
Anrich Nortje	South Africa	2020	2024	46	15	9	49	23*	0	0	8.17	100.00	1054	60	3/33	8.96	26.23	10	0
Mohit Sharma	India	2020	2025	9	2	1	1	1*	0	0	1.00	33.33	174	3	1/10	10.41	100.67	1	0
Chris Woakes	England	2021	2021	3	1	1	15	15*	0	0	–	136.36	66	5	2/18	7.45	16.40	0	0
Steve Smith	Australia	2021	2021	8	7	1	157	39	0	0	25.33	112.59	0	–	–	–	–	9	0
Tom Curran	England	2021	2021	3	2	1	21	21	0	0	21.00	123.53	68	4	3/29	9.18	26.00	0	0
Lukman Meriwala	India	2021	2021	1	0	0	–	–	0	0	–	–	18	1	1/32	10.67	32.00	0	0
Ripal Patel	India	2021	2023	9	7	2	80	23	0	0	16.00	109.59	18	0	0/22	7.33	–	0	0
Lalit Yadav	India	2021	2024	27	21	5	305	48*	0	0	19.06	105.17	288	10	2/11	8.85	42.50	16	0
K. S. Bharat ‡	India	2022	2022	2	2	0	8	8	0	0	4.00	114.29	0	–	–	–	–	0	0
Tim Seifert ‡	New Zealand	2022	2022	2	2	0	24	21	0	0	12.00	126.32	0	–	–	–	–	1	0
Mandeep Singh	India	2022	2022	3	3	0	18	18	0	0	6.00	78.26	0	–	–	–	–	1	0
Kamlesh Nagarkoti	India	2022	2022	1	0	0	–	–	0	0	–	–	12	0	0/29	14.50	–	0	0
Shardul Thakur	India	2022	2022	14	10	2	120	29*	0	0	15.00	137.93	290	15	4/36	9.79	31.53	7	0
Rovman Powell	West Indies	2022	2023	17	15	2	257	67*	0	1	19.77	146.02	18	1	1/18	11.67	35.00	10	0
Mustafizur Rahman	Bangladesh	2022	2025	13	3	2	4	3*	0	0	4.00	57.15	300	13	3/18	8.20	31.54	1	0
Chetan Sakariya	India	2022	2023	5	2	1	4	4	0	0	4.00	66.67	114	6	2/23	9.11	28.83	2	0
Khaleel Ahmed	India	2022	2024	33	2	0	0	0	0	0	0.00	0.00	733	42	3/25	8.96	26.07	3	0
Mitchell Marsh	Australia	2022	2024	21	21	0	440	89	0	3	20.95	135.80	241	17	4/27	9.34	22.06	3	0
Kuldeep Yadav §	India	2022	2026	55	27	18	144	35*	0	0	16.00	91.72	1198	64	4/14	7.89	24.61	11	0
Yash Dhull	India	2023	2023	4	3	0	16	13	0	0	5.33	69.57	0	–	–	–	–	2	0
Sarfaraz Khan ‡	India	2023	2023	10	9	2	144	36*	0	0	20.57	111.63	0	–	–	–	–	4	0
Priyam Garg	India	2023	2023	2	2	0	22	12	0	0	11.00	95.65	0	–	–	–	–	0	0
Manish Pandey	India	2023	2023	10	9	0	160	50	0	1	17.78	109.59	0	–	–	–	–	3	0
Rilee Rossouw	South Africa	2023	2023	9	9	2	209	82*	0	1	29.86	148.23	0	–	–	–	–	3	0
Phil Salt ‡	England	2023	2023	9	9	1	218	87	0	2	27.75	163.91	0	–	–	–	–	5	0
Aman Khan	India	2023	2023	11	9	1	110	51	0	1	13.75	108.91	0	–	–	–	–	9	0
Abhishek Porel § ‡	India	2023	2025	31	29	3	661	65	0	3	25.42	149.89	0	–	–	–	–	9	0
Mukesh Kumar §	India	2023	2026	34	5	4	10	6*	0	0	10.00	55.56	672	38	4/33	10.22	30.13	12	0
Ricky Bhui	India	2024	2024	2	2	0	3	3	0	0	1.50	33.33	0	–	–	–	–	0	0
Shai Hope ‡	West Indies	2024	2024	9	9	1	183	41	0	0	22.88	150.00	0	–	–	–	–	6	0
Kumar Kushagra ‡	India	2024	2024	4	3	0	3	2	0	0	1.00	42.86	0	–	–	–	–	1	0
Sumit Kumar	India	2024	2024	4	3	1	18	9*	0	0	9.00	75.00	20	0	0/19	11.40	–	1	0
Rasikh Salam	India	2024	2024	11	4	0	28	10	0	0	7.00	93.33	147	9	3/34	10.98	29.89	1	0
Jhye Richardson	Australia	2024	2024	1	1	0	2	2	0	0	2.00	100.00	24	0	0/40	10.00	–	0	0
Lizaad Williams	South Africa	2024	2024	2	1	1	1	1*	0	0	–	50.00	36	1	1/38	12.00	72.00	1	0
Jake Fraser-McGurk	Australia	2024	2025	15	15	0	385	84	0	4	25.67	199.48	0	–	–	–	–	6	0
Tristan Stubbs § ‡	South Africa	2024	2026	30	28	15	720	71*	0	3	55.38	166.28	24	3	2/11	13.75	18.33	20	1
Faf du Plessis	South Africa	2025	2025	9	9	0	202	62	0	2	22.44	123.93	0	–	–	–	–	4	0
KL Rahul § ‡	India	2025	2026	15	15	3	540	112*	1	3	45.00	148.35	0	–	–	–	–	4	0
Sameer Rizvi §	India	2025	2026	7	6	2	281	90	0	3	70.25	158.76	0	–	–	–	–	2	0
Donovan Ferreira	South Africa	2025	2025	1	1	0	1	1	0	0	1.00	33.33	0	–	–	–	–	0	0
Ashutosh Sharma §	India	2025	2025	13	9	2	204	66*	0	1	29.14	160.63	0	–	–	–	–	2	0
Dushmantha Chameera §	Sri Lanka	2025	2025	6	3	3	10	8*	0	0	–	71.43	90	4	1/24	11.40	42.75	1	0
Vipraj Nigam §	India	2025	2026	16	8	1	142	39	0	0	20.29	179.75	258	12	2/18	9.02	32.33	3	0
Mitchell Starc §	Australia	2025	2025	11	6	4	6	2	0	0	3.00	60.00	216	14	5/35	10.17	26.14	7	0
T. Natarajan §	India	2025	2026	4	0	0	–	–	0	0	–	–	60	4	3/29	10.20	25.50	0	0
Sediqullah Atal	Afghanistan	2025	2025	1	1	0	22	22	0	0	22.00	137.50	0	–	–	–	–	0	0
Madhav Tiwari §	India	2025	2025	1	1	0	3	3	0	0	3.00	75.00	0	–	–	–	–	1	0
Pathum Nissanka §	Sri Lanka	2026	2026	2	2	0	45	44	0	0	22.50	128.57	0	–	–	–	–	0	0
Nitish Rana §	India	2026	2026	2	2	0	15	15	0	0	7.50	75.00	0	–	–	–	–	1	0
Lungi Ngidi §	South Africa	2026	2026	2	0	0	–	–	0	0	–	–	46	4	3/27	7.96	15.25	0	0
David Miller §	South Africa	2026	2026	2	1	1	21	21*	0	0	–	116.67	0	–	–	–	–	1	0

== Captains ==
Key

- First – Year of first match captained for the Capitals
- Last – Year of latest match captained for the Capitals

Statistics are correct as of the Capitals's match against the Mumbai Indians at Feroz Shah Kotla Ground, Delhi, 2018 IPL, 20 May 2018.
These statistics do not cover practice matches or matches abandoned without a toss.

The Capitals captains
Name	First	Last	Mat	Won	Lost	Tie	NR	Win% (Note: Games that did not have a result are not included in calculating the win percentage. Ties are counted as half a win.)
Virender Sehwag	2008	2012	52	28	24	0	0	53.84
Gautam Gambhir	2009	2018	25	12	13	0	0	48.00
Dinesh Karthik	2010	2014	6	2	4	0	0	33.33
James Hopes	2011	2011	3	0	2	0	1	0.00
Mahela Jayawardene	2012	2013	18	6	11	1	0	36.11
Ross Taylor	2012	2012	2	0	1	0	1	0.00
Kevin Pietersen	2014	2014	11	1	10	0	0	9.09
JP Duminy	2014	2016	16	6	9	0	1	40.00
Zaheer Khan	2016	2017	23	10	13	0	0	43.47
Karun Nair	2017	2017	3	2	1	0	0	66.66
Shreyas Iyer	2018	2020	41	21	18	2	0	53.66
David Warner	2013	2023	16	5	11	0	0	31.25
Rishabh Pant	2021	2024	43	23	19	1	0	54.66
Axar Patel	2024	2025	3	2	1	0	0	66.66
Total			262	118	137	4	3	45.73

== See also ==
- GMR Group
- Munday Dilli ke
