= 2012 Kings XI Punjab season =

Indian Premier League cricket team season

Kings XI Punjab
2012 season
- Coach: Adam Gilchrist
- Captain: Adam Gilchrist
- Ground(s): PCA Stadium, Mohali
- IPL: 6th
- Most runs: Mandeep Singh (432)
- Most wickets: Piyush Chawla (16)

Kings XI Punjab (KXIP) is a franchise cricket team based in Mohali, India, which plays in the Indian Premier League (IPL). They were one of the nine teams that competed in the 2012 Indian Premier League. They were captained by Adam Gilchrist. Kings XI Punjab finished 6th in the IPL and did not qualify for the champions league T20.

== Squad ==
Players with international caps prior to the 2012 season are listed in bold.

No.	Name	Nat	Birth date	Batting Style	Bowling Style	Notes
Batsmen
07	Paul Valthaty	(India)	7 December 1983 (aged 28)	Right-handed	Right-arm medium	
12	Mandeep Singh	(India)	18 December 1991 (aged 20)	Right-handed	Right-arm medium	
14	**Shaun Marsh**	(Australia)	9 July 1983 (aged 28)	Left-handed	Slow left arm orthodox	Overseas
16	Paras Dogra	(India)	19 November 1984 (aged 27)	Right-handed	Right-arm leg break	
20	**David Miller**	(South Africa)	10 June 1989 (aged 22)	Left-handed	Right-arm off break	Overseas
22	Gurkeerat Singh	(India)	29 June 1990 (aged 21)	Right-handed	Right-arm off break	
29	**David Hussey**	(Australia)	15 July 1977 (aged 34)	Right-handed	Right-arm off break	Vice-captain
–	Sunny Singh	(India)	18 December 1986 (aged 25)	Right-handed	Right-arm medium	
–	Siddharth Chitnis	(India)	6 May 1987 (aged 24)	Right-handed	Right-arm off break	
All-rounders
04	Bipul Sharma	(India)	28 September 1983 (aged 28)	Left-handed	Slow left arm orthodox	
06	**James Faulkner**	(Australia)	29 April 1990 (aged 21)	Right-handed	Left-arm medium-fast	Overseas
17	**Dimitri Mascarenhas**	(England)	30 October 1977 (aged 34)	Right-handed	Right-arm fast-medium	Overseas
23	Rajagopal Sathish	(India)	14 January 1981 (aged 31)	Right-handed	Right-arm medium	
25	**Abhishek Nayar**	(India)	8 October 1983 (aged 28)	Left-handed	Right-arm medium	
27	**Azhar Mahmood**	(England)	28 February 1975 (aged 37)	Right-handed	Right-arm fast-medium	Overseas
–	Ben Cutting	(Australia)	30 January 1987 (aged 25)	Right-handed	Right-arm medium-fast	Overseas
–	Amit Yadav	(India)	10 October 1989 (aged 22)	Right-handed	Right-arm off break	
Wicket-keepers
18	**Adam Gilchrist**	(Australia)	14 November 1971 (aged 40)	Left-handed	Right-arm off break	Captain
63	Nitin Saini	(India)	28 October 1988 (aged 23)	Right-handed	–	
Bowlers
03	Harmeet Singh	(India)	9 October 1987 (aged 24)	Right-handed	Right-arm medium	
08	**Stuart Broad**	(England)	24 June 1986 (aged 25)	Left-handed	Right-arm fast-medium	Overseas
11	**Piyush Chawla**	(India)	24 December 1988 (aged 23)	Left-handed	Right-arm leg break	
13	Bhargav Bhatt	(India)	13 May 1990 (aged 21)	Left-handed	Slow left arm orthodox	
34	Parvinder Awana	(India)	19 July 1986 (aged 25)	Right-handed	Right-arm fast-medium	
45	**Ryan Harris**	(Australia)	11 October 1979 (aged 32)	Right-handed	Right arm fast	Overseas
55	**Ramesh Powar**	(India)	20 May 1978 (aged 33)	Right-handed	Right-arm off break	
70	Shalabh Srivastava	(India)	22 September 1981 (aged 30)	Right-handed	Left-arm fast-medium	
83	Vikramjeet Malik	(India)	9 May 1983 (aged 28)	Right-handed	Right-arm medium-fast	
88	**Praveen Kumar**	(India)	2 October 1986 (aged 25)	Right-handed	Right-arm medium-fast	
–	Love Ablish	(India)	3 December 1982 (aged 29)	Right-handed	Right-arm medium-fast	
–	Kyle Abbott	(South Africa)	18 June 1987 (aged 24)	Right-handed	Right arm fast-medium	Overseas
–	Nathan Rimmington	(Australia)	11 November 1982 (aged 29)	Right-handed	Right arm fast-medium	Overseas

== Indian Premier League ==
=== Season standings ===
Kings XI Punjab finished 6th in the league stage of IPL 2012.

Pos	Team	Pld	W	L	NR	Pts	NRR
1	Delhi Daredevils (3rd)	16	11	5	0	22	0.617
2	Kolkata Knight Riders (C)	16	10	5	1	21	0.561
3	Mumbai Indians (4th)	16	10	6	0	20	−0.100
4	Chennai Super Kings (RU)	16	8	7	1	17	0.100
5	Royal Challengers Bangalore	16	8	7	1	17	−0.022
6	Kings XI Punjab	16	8	8	0	16	−0.216
7	Rajasthan Royals	16	7	9	0	14	0.201
8	Deccan Chargers	16	4	11	1	9	−0.509
9	Pune Warriors India	16	4	12	0	8	−0.551

- The top four teams qualified for the playoffs
- C refers to the eventual winners of the tournament, RU to the runners-up

=== Match log ===
No.	Date	Opponent	Venue	Result	Scorecard
1	6 April	Rajasthan Royals	Jaipur	Lost by 31 runs	Score Card
2	8 April	Pune Warriors India	Pune	Lost by 22 runs	Score Card
3	12 April	Pune Warriors India	Mohali	Won by 7 wickets, MoM - Dimitri Mascarenhas 5/25	Score Card
4	15 April	Kolkata Knight Riders	Kolkata	Won by 2 runs	Score Card
5	18 April	Kolkata Knight Riders	Mohali	Lost by 8 wickets	Score Card
6	20 April	Royal Challengers Bangalore	Mohali	Lost by 5 wickets	Score Card
7	22 April	Mumbai Indians	Mumbai	Won by 6 wickets, MoM - Shaun Marsh 68* (40)	Score Card
8	25 April	Mumbai Indians	Mohali	Lost by 4 wickets	Scorecard
9	28 April	Chennai Super Kings	Chennai	Won by 7 runs, MoM- Mandeep Singh 56 (50)	Score Card
10	2 May	Royal Challengers Bangalore	Bengaluru	Won by 4 wickets MoM- Azhar Mahmood 3/20	Score Card
11	5 May	Rajasthan Royals	Mohali	Lost by 43 runs	Score Card
12	8 May	Hyderabad Deccan Chargers	Hyderabad	Won by 25 runs, MoM- Mandeep Singh 75 (48)	Score Card
13	13 May	Hyderabad Deccan Chargers	Mohali	Won by 4 wickets, MoM- David Hussey 65* (35)	Score Card
14	15 May	Delhi Daredevils	New Delhi	Lost by 5 wickets	Score Card
15	17 May	Chennai Super Kings	Dharamsala	Won by 6 wickets, MoM- Adam Gilchrist 64* (46)	Score Card
16	19 May	Delhi Daredevils	Dharamsala	Lost by 6 wickets	Score Card
Overall record: 8-8. Failed to advance.
