= 2012 Royal Challengers Bangalore season =

Indian Premier League cricket team season

Royal Challengers Bangalore
2012 season
- Coach: Ray Jennings
- Captain: Daniel Vettori
- Ground(s): M. Chinnaswamy Stadium, Bangalore
- League stage: 5th
- Most runs: Chris Gayle (733)
- Most wickets: Vinay Kumar (19)

Royal Challengers Bangalore is a franchise cricket team based in Bangalore, India, which plays in the Indian Premier League. They were one of the nine teams that competed in the 2012 Indian Premier League. They were captained by Daniel Vettori. They finished fifth in the IPL and did not qualify for the Champions League T20.

== Squad ==
Players with international caps before the 2012 IPL season are listed in bold.

No.	Name	Nationality	Birth date	Batting Style	Bowling Style	Notes
Batsmen
02	**Mohammad Kaif**	India	1 December 1980 (aged 31)	Right-handed	Right-arm off break	
03	**Cheteshwar Pujara**	India	25 January 1988 (aged 24)	Right-handed	Right-arm leg break	
09	Arun Karthik	India	15 February 1986 (aged 26)	Right-handed	Right-arm leg break	
12	**Luke Pomersbach**	Australia	28 September 1984 (aged 27)	Left-handed	Right-arm off break	Overseas
14	Mayank Agarwal	India	16 February 1991 (aged 21)	Right-handed	–	
18	**Virat Kohli**	India	5 November 1988 (aged 23)	Right-handed	Right-arm medium	Captain
32	**Saurabh Tiwary**	India	30 December 1989 (aged 22)	Left-handed	Right-arm off break	
–	Rilee Rossouw	South Africa	9 October 1989 (aged 22)	Left-handed	Right-arm off break	Overseas
–	Vijay Zol	India	23 November 1994 (aged 17)	Left-handed	Right-arm off break	
All-rounders
04	**Andrew McDonald**	Australia	15 June 1981 (aged 30)	Right-handed	Right-arm medium-fast	Overseas
07	Asad Pathan	India	17 June 1984 (aged 27)	Right-handed	Right-arm medium	
11	**Daniel Vettori**	New Zealand	27 January 1979 (aged 33)	Left-handed	Slow left arm orthodox	Overseas
23	**Tillakaratne Dilshan**	Sri Lanka	14 October 1976 (aged 35)	Right-handed	Right-arm off break	Overseas
37	Rajoo Bhatkal	India	1 September 1985 (aged 26)	Right-handed	Right-arm medium	
333	**Chris Gayle**	Jamaica	21 September 1979 (aged 32)	Left-handed	Right-arm off break	Overseas
Wicket-keepers
17	**AB de Villiers**	South Africa	17 February 1984 (aged 28)	Right-handed	Right-arm medium	Overseas
–	CM Gautam	India	8 March 1986 (aged 26)	Right-handed	–	
Bowlers
01	Harshal Patel	India	23 November 1990 (aged 21)	Right-handed	Right-arm medium-fast	
03	KP Appanna	India	20 December 1988 (aged 23)	Right-handed	Slow left arm orthodox	
05	**Vinay Kumar**	India	12 February 1984 (aged 28)	Right-handed	Right-arm medium-fast	
08	Syed Mohammed	India	3 June 1983 (aged 28)	Left-handed	Slow left arm orthodox	
20	Prasanth Parameswaran	India	30 May 1985 (aged 26)	Right-handed	Left-arm medium-fast	
25	**Abhimanyu Mithun**	India	25 October 1989 (aged 22)	Right-handed	Right arm medium-fast	
34	**Zaheer Khan**	India	7 October 1978 (aged 33)	Right-handed	Left-arm fast-medium	
63	**Dirk Nannes**	Australia	16 May 1976 (aged 35)	Right-handed	Left-arm fast	Overseas
67	**Charl Langeveldt**	South Africa	17 December 1974 (aged 37)	Right-handed	Right-arm fast-medium	Overseas
79	Sreenath Aravind	India	8 April 1984 (aged 27)	Left-handed	Left-arm medium-fast	
800	**Muttiah Muralitharan**	Sri Lanka	17 April 1972 (aged 39)	Right-handed	Right-arm off break	Overseas

== Indian Premier League season ==
=== Standings ===
Royal Challengers Bangalore finished fifth in the league stage of IPL 2012.

Pos	Team	Pld	W	L	NR	Pts	NRR
1	Delhi Daredevils (3rd)	16	11	5	0	22	0.617
2	Kolkata Knight Riders (C)	16	10	5	1	21	0.561
3	Mumbai Indians (4th)	16	10	6	0	20	−0.100
4	Chennai Super Kings (RU)	16	8	7	1	17	0.100
5	Royal Challengers Bangalore	16	8	7	1	17	−0.022
6	Kings XI Punjab	16	8	8	0	16	−0.216
7	Rajasthan Royals	16	7	9	0	14	0.201
8	Deccan Chargers	16	4	11	1	9	−0.509
9	Pune Warriors India	16	4	12	0	8	−0.551

- The top four teams qualified for the playoffs
- C refers to the eventual winners of the tournament, RU to the runners-up

=== Match log ===
No.	Date	Opponent	Venue	Result	Scorecard
1	7 April	Delhi Daredevils	Bengaluru	Won by 20 runs, MoM – AB de Villiers 64* (42)	Scorecard
2	10 April	Kolkata Knight Riders	Bengaluru	Lost by 42 runs	Scorecard
3	12 April	Chennai Super Kings	Chennai	Lost by 5 wickets	Scorecard
4	15 April	Rajasthan Royals	Bengaluru	Lost by 59 runs	Scorecard
5	17 April	Pune Warriors India	Bengaluru	Won by 6 wickets, MoM – Chris Gayle 81 (48)	Scorecard
6	20 April	Kings XI Punjab	Mohali	Won by 5 wickets, MoM – Chris Gayle 87 (56)	Scorecard
7	23 April	Rajasthan Royals	Jaipur	Won by 46 runs, MoM – AB de Villiers 59* (23)	Scorecard
8	25 April	Chennai Super Kings	Bengaluru	Match Abandoned without a ball bowled due to rain	Scorecard
9	28 April	Kolkata Knight Riders	Kolkata	Lost by 47 runs	Scorecard
10	2 May	Kings XI Punjab	Bengaluru	Lost by 4 wickets	Scorecard
11	6 May	Deccan Chargers	Bengaluru	Won by 5 Wickets, MoM – AB de Villiers 47* (17)	Scorecard
12	9 May	Mumbai Indians	Mumbai	Won by 9 Wickets, MoM – Chris Gayle 82* (59)	Scorecard
13	11 May	Pune Warriors India	Pune	Won by 35 runs, MoM – Chris Gayle 57 (31)	Scorecard
14	14 May	Mumbai Indians	Bengaluru	Lost by 5 Wickets	Scorecard
15	17 May	Delhi Daredevils	New Delhi	Won by 21 runs, MoM – Chris Gayle 128* (62)	Scorecard
16	20 May	Deccan Chargers	Hyderabad	Lost by 9 runs	Scorecard
Overall record: 8–7. Failed to advance.
