= 2012 Rajasthan Royals season =

Indian Premier League cricket team season

Rajasthan Royals
2012 season
- Coach: Shane Warne
- Captain: Rahul Dravid
- Ground(s): Sawai Mansingh Stadium, Jaipur
- IPL: 7th
- Most runs: Ajinkya Rahane (560)
- Most wickets: Siddharth Trivedi (13)

Rajasthan Royals (RR) is a franchise cricket team based in Jaipur, India, which plays in the Indian Premier League (IPL). They were one of the nine teams that competed in the 2012 Indian Premier League. They were captained by Rahul Dravid. Rajasthan Royals finished 7th in the IPL and did not qualify for the champions league T20.

== Squad ==
Players with international caps prior to the 2012 season are listed in bold.

No.	Name	Nat	Birth date	Batting Style	Bowling Style	Notes
Batsmen
01	Ashok Menaria	(India)	29 October 1990 (aged 21)	Left-handed	Slow left arm orthodox	
03	**Ajinkya Rahane**	(India)	5 June 1988 (aged 23)	Right-handed	Right-arm medium	
06	**Aakash Chopra**	(India)	19 September 1977 (aged 34)	Right-handed	Right-arm off break	
07	**Brad Hodge**	(Australia)	29 December 1974 (aged 37)	Right-handed	Right-arm off break	Overseas
19	**Rahul Dravid**	(India)	11 January 1973 (aged 39)	Right-handed	Right-arm off break	Captain
24	Faiz Fazal	(India)	7 September 1985 (aged 26)	Left-handed	Right-arm medium-fast	
99	**Owais Shah**	(England)	22 October 1978 (aged 33)	Right-handed	Right-arm off break	Overseas
All-rounders
02	Abhishek Raut	(India)	3 March 1987 (aged 25)	Right-handed	Right-arm leg break	
05	**Paul Collingwood**	(England)	26 May 1976 (aged 35)	Right-handed	Right-arm medium	Overseas
08	Sumit Narwal	(India)	16 April 1982 (aged 29)	Left-handed	Right-arm medium-fast	
11	Ajit Chandila	(India)	5 December 1983 (aged 28)	Right-handed	Right-arm off break	
22	**Johan Botha**	(South Africa)	2 May 1982 (aged 29)	Right-handed	Right-arm off break	Overseas
28	Ankeet Chavan	(India)	28 October 1985 (aged 26)	Left-handed	Slow left arm orthodox	
33	**Shane Watson**	(Australia)	17 June 1981 (aged 30)	Right-handed	Right-arm fast-medium	Vice-captain
84	Stuart Binny	(India)	3 June 1984 (aged 27)	Right-handed	Right-arm medium	
	Kevon Cooper	(Trinidad and Tobago)	2 February 1989 (aged 23)	Right-handed	Right-arm medium-fast	Overseas
Wicket-keepers
16	Pinal Shah	(India)	3 November 1987 (aged 24)	Right-handed	–	
17	**Dinesh Chandimal**	(Sri Lanka)	18 November 1989 (aged 22)	Right-handed	Right-arm off break	Overseas
63	Shreevats Goswami	(India)	18 May 1989 (aged 22)	Left-handed	–	
	Amit Paunikar	(India)	18 April 1988 (aged 23)	Right-handed	–	
	Dishant Yagnik	(India)	22 June 1983 (aged 28)	Left-handed	–	
Bowlers
20	Amit Singh	(India)	21 June 1981 (aged 30)	Right-handed	Right-arm medium-fast	
31	**Brad Hogg**	(Australia)	6 February 1971 (aged 41)	Left-handed	Left-arm chinaman	Overseas
32	**Shaun Tait**	(Australia)	22 February 1983 (aged 29)	Right-handed	Right-arm fast	Overseas
36	**Sreesanth**	(India)	6 February 1983 (aged 29)	Right-handed	Right-arm fast-medium	
37	Siddharth Trivedi	(India)	4 September 1982 (aged 29)	Right-handed	Right-arm medium-fast	
44	Samad Fallah	(India)	2 May 1985 (aged 26)	Left-handed	Left-arm medium-fast	
91	**Pankaj Singh**	(India)	6 May 1985 (aged 26)	Right-handed	Right-arm fast-medium	
	Aditya Dole	(India)	9 October 1987 (aged 24)	Right-handed	Right-arm medium-fast	
	Deepak Chahar	(India)	7 August 1992 (aged 19)	Right-handed	Right-arm medium-fast	
	Gajendra Singh	(India)	10 September 1988 (aged 23)	Right-handed	Slow left arm orthodox	

== IPL ==
=== Standings ===
Rajasthan Royals finished 7th in the league stage of IPL 2012.

Pos	Team	Pld	W	L	NR	Pts	NRR
1	Delhi Daredevils (3rd)	16	11	5	0	22	0.617
2	Kolkata Knight Riders (C)	16	10	5	1	21	0.561
3	Mumbai Indians (4th)	16	10	6	0	20	−0.100
4	Chennai Super Kings (RU)	16	8	7	1	17	0.100
5	Royal Challengers Bangalore	16	8	7	1	17	−0.022
6	Kings XI Punjab	16	8	8	0	16	−0.216
7	Rajasthan Royals	16	7	9	0	14	0.201
8	Deccan Chargers	16	4	11	1	9	−0.509
9	Pune Warriors India	16	4	12	0	8	−0.551

- The top four teams qualified for the playoffs
- C refers to the eventual winners of the tournament, RU to the runners-up

=== Match log ===
No.	Date	Opponent	Venue	Result	Man of the match	Scorecard
1	6 April 2012	Kings XI Punjab	Jaipur	Won by 31 runs	Ajinkya Rahane (98)	Scorecard
2	8 April 2012	Kolkata Knight Riders	Jaipur	Won by 22 runs	Brad Hodge 44 (29)	Scorecard
3	11 April 2012	Mumbai Indians	Mumbai	Lost by 27 runs		Scorecard
4	13 April 2012	Kolkata Knight Riders	Kolkata	Lost by 5 wickets		Scorecard
5	15 April 2012	Royal Challengers Bangalore	Bangalore	Won by 59 runs	(India) Ajinkya Rahane 103*	Scorecard
6	17 April 2012	Deccan Chargers	Jaipur	Won by 5 wickets	Brad Hodge	Scorecard
7	21 April 2012	Chennai Super Kings	Chennai	Lost by 7 Wickets		Scorecard
8	23 April 2012	Royal Challengers Bangalore	Jaipur	Lost by 46 runs		Scorecard
9	29 April 2012	Delhi Daredevils	New Delhi	Lost by 1 run		Scorecard
10	1 May 2012	Delhi Daredevils	Jaipur	Lost by 6 wickets		Scorecard
11	5 May 2012	Kings XI Punjab	Mohali	Won by 43 runs	Shane Watson	Score Card
12	8 May 2012	Pune Warriors India	Pune	Won by 7 wickets	Shane Watson 90* (51)	Scorecard
13	10 May 2012	Chennai Super Kings	Jaipur	Lost by 4 Wickets		Scorecard
14	13 May 2012	Pune Warriors India	Jaipur	Won by 45 runs	(India) Ajit Chandila 4/13	Scorecard
15	18 May 2012	Deccan Chargers	Hyderabad	Lost by 5 Wickets		Scorecard
16	20 May 2012	Mumbai Indians	Jaipur	Lost by 10 wickets		Scorecard
