= 2012 Kolkata Knight Riders season =

Indian Premier League cricket team season

Kolkata Knight Riders
2012 season
- Coach: Trevor Bayliss
- Captain: Gautam Gambhir
- Ground(s): Eden Gardens, Kolkata
- IPL: Winners
- CLT20: Group stage
- Most runs: Gautam Gambhir (590)
- Most wickets: Sunil Narine (24)

Kolkata Knight Riders (KKR) is a franchise cricket team based in Kolkata, India, which plays in the Indian Premier League (IPL). They were one of the nine teams that competed in the 2012 IPL. They were captained by Gautam Gambhir. Kolkata Knight Riders emerged as winners of the 2012 IPL and qualified for the Champions League T20.

== Background ==
Due to the disbanding of Kochi Tuskers Kerala, each team played the remaining eight teams twice, once at home and once away. Therefore, each team played 16 matches. KKR bought back Brendon McCullum for $900,000 and West Indies Sunil Narine for $700,000. They also bought South-African Marchant de Lange for $50,000. The team replaced coach Dav Whatmore by Trevor Bayliss. Kolkata Knight Riders also launched a new marketing campaign titled "New Dawn. New Knights" and a new logo.

KKR got off to a poor start in the tournament, losing their first two games against Delhi Daredevils and Rajasthan Royals. However, they fought back with consecutive wins over Royal Challengers Bangalore and Rajasthan Royals. In the next match, however, they messed up an easy chase against Kings XI Punjab, losing narrowly by 2 runs. KKR's West Indian spinner Sunil Narine took the only five-wicket haul of the tournament (5–19) in that match and despite his team losing, he was declared as the Man of the Match. KKR then went on to win six matches in a row (except for a washed-out match against Deccan Chargers). However, the team's performances dipped in the following two matches, losing against Mumbai Indians and Chennai Super Kings. Eventually the team had a timely return to form, when they beat Mumbai Indians and Pune Warriors India in successive away matches, with the team bowling economically to defend average totals. This earned a second-place finish for the team at the end of the league stage and a semi-final match against Delhi Daredevils. An all-round performance from them saw Delhi being defeated by 18 runs, and KKR also qualifying for their maiden IPL final.

The final between the Knight Riders and the defending two-time champions Chennai Super Kings was held at the M. A. Chidambaram Stadium. A hamstring injury to Lakshmipathy Balaji resulted in the inclusion of Brett Lee and due to him being a foreign player, the team was required to leave out their wicket-keeper batsman Brendon McCullum to maintain the cap of 4 foreign players. Manvinder Bisla was brought in to replace McCullum. The team eventually won the match with the help of some impressive batting performance by Bisla (89 from 48 balls) and Jacques Kallis (69 from 49 balls) to become the champions of the tournament for the first time. Manvinder Bisla was declared Man of the Match and Sunil Narine was named Man of the Series.

Sunil Narine was the second-highest wicket-taker as well as player of the tournament, and also had the best economy rate in the tournament. The batting was led by skipper Gautam Gambhir, who was the second-highest run-getter of the tournament and scored 6 half-centuries out of a total of 11 from his team.

The state of West Bengal set up a grand felicitation involving Chief Minister of West Bengal Mamata Banerjee and Governor of West Bengal M K Narayanan . The Cricket Association of Bengal gifted the 17 members of the team with gold chain each and mementos. A victory parade for the team members was also organized on 28 May beginning from Hazra, Writers' Building to the Eden Garden stadium where ten thousand spectators came to cheer for the team during a one-hour celebration that was compared to the India's World Cup victory lap at the Wankhede in Mumbai the year before. However, the celebration received criticism from media and certain political parties and had been ridiculed by some pools of society as it had only been organized for a club team. Shahrukh Khan, the team's co-owner and the state's brand ambassador, defended the decision."

=== Champions League Twenty20 ===
KKR's maiden IPL victory in 2012 meant that they would now participate in the 2012 Champions League Twenty20 which was held in South Africa. They were in Group A along with Delhi Daredevils, Perth Scorchers, Auckland Aces and Titans. But disappointingly, they were eliminated in the group stage itself, winning only one game against the Titans, which they did so with a record breaking 99 run margin. This was the highest victory margin ever recorded in the CLT20 tournament. Losses to Delhi Daredevils and Auckland Aces followed by a washed out game against Perth meant that KKR finished 3rd in Group A and failed to qualify for the knock out stages of the tournament.

== Squad ==
Players with international caps prior to the 2012 season are listed in bold.

No.	Name	Nationality	Birth date	Batting Style	Bowling Style	Notes
Batters
03	**Gautam Gambhir**	India	14 October 1981 (aged 30)	Left-handed	Right-arm leg break	Captain
09	**Manoj Tiwary**	India	14 November 1985 (aged 26)	Right-handed	Right-arm leg break	
16	**Eoin Morgan**	England	10 September 1986 (aged 25)	Left-handed	Right-arm medium	Overseas
63	Debabrata Das	India	22 September 1986 (aged 25)	Right-handed	Right-arm leg break	
All-rounders
03	**Jacques Kallis**	South Africa	16 October 1975 (aged 36)	Right-handed	Right-arm medium-fast	Vice-captain
06	**Laxmi Ratan Shukla**	India	6 May 1981 (aged 30)	Right-handed	Right-arm medium	
22	Rajat Bhatia	India	22 October 1979 (aged 32)	Right-handed	Right-arm medium-fast	
27	**Ryan ten Doeschate**	Netherlands	30 June 1980 (aged 31)	Right-handed	Right arm medium-fast	Overseas
28	**Yusuf Pathan**	India	17 November 1982 (aged 29)	Right-handed	Right-arm off break	
75	**Shakib Al Hasan**	Bangladesh	24 March 1987 (aged 25)	Left-handed	Slow left arm orthodox	Overseas
–	Chirag Jani	India	9 November 1989 (aged 22)	Right-handed	Right-arm medium	
Wicket-keepers
24	**Brad Haddin**	Australia	23 October 1977 (aged 34)	Right-handed	–	Overseas
36	Manvinder Bisla	India	27 December 1984 (aged 27)	Right-handed	–	
36	**Brendon McCullum**	New Zealand	27 September 1981 (aged 30)	Right-handed	Right-arm medium	Overseas
–	Sanju Samson	India	11 November 1994 (aged 17)	Right-handed	–	
Bowlers
04	**James Pattinson**	Australia	3 May 1990 (aged 21)	Left-handed	Right-arm fast-medium	Overseas
08	Pradeep Sangwan	India	5 November 1990 (aged 21)	Right-handed	Left-arm medium-fast	
14	Shami Ahmed	India	9 March 1990 (aged 22)	Right-handed	Right-arm medium-fast	
21	Iqbal Abdulla	India	2 December 1989 (aged 22)	Left-handed	Slow left arm orthodox	
55	**Lakshmipathy Balaji**	India	27 September 1981 (aged 30)	Right-handed	Right arm medium-fast	
58	**Brett Lee**	Australia	8 November 1976 (aged 35)	Right-handed	Right-arm fast	Overseas
74	**Sunil Narine**	West Indies	26 May 1988 (aged 23)	Left-handed	Right-arm off break	Overseas
90	**Marchant de Lange**	South Africa	13 October 1990 (aged 21)	Right-handed	Right-arm fast	Overseas
99	**Jaydev Unadkat**	India	18 October 1991 (aged 20)	Right-handed	Left-arm medium-fast	
–	Iresh Saxena	India	14 March 1984 (aged 28)	Right-handed	Slow left arm orthodox	
–	Sarabjit Ladda	India	10 July 1986 (aged 25)	Right-handed	Right-arm leg break	

== Indian Premier League ==
=== Season standings ===
Kolkata Knight Riders finished runners-up in the league stage of IPL 2012.

Pos	Team	Pld	W	L	NR	Pts	NRR
1	Delhi Daredevils (3rd)	16	11	5	0	22	0.617
2	Kolkata Knight Riders (C)	16	10	5	1	21	0.561
3	Mumbai Indians (4th)	16	10	6	0	20	−0.100
4	Chennai Super Kings (RU)	16	8	7	1	17	0.100
5	Royal Challengers Bangalore	16	8	7	1	17	−0.022
6	Kings XI Punjab	16	8	8	0	16	−0.216
7	Rajasthan Royals	16	7	9	0	14	0.201
8	Deccan Chargers	16	4	11	1	9	−0.509
9	Pune Warriors India	16	4	12	0	8	−0.551

- The top four teams qualified for the playoffs
- C refers to the eventual winners of the tournament, RU to the runners-up

=== Match log ===
No.	Date	Opponent	Venue	Result	Scorecard
1	5 April	Delhi Daredevils	Kolkata	Lost by 8 wickets	Score Card
2	8 April	Rajasthan Royals	Jaipur	Lost by 22 runs	Score Card
3	10 April	Royal Challengers Bangalore	Bengaluru	Won by 42 runs, MoM – Lakshmipathy Balaji 4/18	Score Card
4	13 April	Rajasthan Royals	Kolkata	Won by 5 wickets, MoM – Shakib Al Hasan 3/17 & 16 (10)	Score Card
5	15 April	Kings XI Punjab	Kolkata	Lost by 2 runs, MoM – Sunil Narine 5/19	Score Card
6	18 April	Kings XI Punjab	Mohali	Won by 8 wickets, MoM – Gautam Gambhir 66* (44)	Score Card
7	22 April	Deccan Chargers	Cuttack	Won by 5 wickets, MoM – Brett Lee 1/15	Score Card
8	24 April	Deccan Chargers	Kolkata	Match Abandoned without a ball bowled	Scorecard
9	28 April	Royal Challengers Bangalore	Kolkata	Won by 47 runs, MoM – Gautam Gambhir 93 (51)	Score Card
10	30 April	Chennai Super Kings	Chennai	Won by 5 wickets, MoM- Gautam Gambhir 63(52)	Score Card
11	5 May	Pune Warriors India	Kolkata	Won by 7 runs, MoM – Sunil Narine 1/13	Score Card
12	7 May	Delhi Daredevils	New Delhi	Won by 6 wickets, MoM – Jacques Kallis 2/20,30 (27)	Score Card
13	12 May	Mumbai Indians	Kolkata	Lost by 27 runs	Score Card
14	14 May	Chennai Super Kings	Kolkata	Lost by 5 wickets	Score Card
15	16 May	Mumbai Indians	Mumbai	Won by 32 runs, MoM – Sunil Narine 4/15	Score Card
16	19 May	Pune Warriors India	Pune	Won by 34 runs, MoM – Shakib Al Hasan 42 (30) & 2/18	Score Card
17	22 May	Delhi Daredevils (Qualifier 1)	Pune	Won by 18 runs, MoM – Yusuf Pathan 40* (21)	Score Card
18	27 May	Chennai Super Kings (Final)	Chennai	won by 5 wickets, MoM – Manvinder Bisla 89 (48)	Score Card
Overall record: 12–5. Champions. Qualified for 2012 Champions League Twenty20

== Champions League Twenty20 ==
=== Match log ===
No.	Date	Opponent	Venue	Result	Match Scorecard
1	13 October	Delhi Daredevils	Centurion	Lost by 52 runs	Scorecard
2	15 October	Auckland Aces	Cape Town	Lost by 7 wickets	Scorecard
3	17 October	Perth Scorchers	Durban	Match abandoned due to rain	Scorecard
4	21 October	Titans	Cape Town	Won by 99 runs, MoM – Debabrata Das – 43* (19)	Scorecard
Overall record: 1–2. Failed to advance.
