= 2012 Mumbai Indians season =

Indian Premier League cricket team season

Mumbai Indians
2012 season
- Coach: Robin Singh
- Captain: Harbhajan Singh
- IPL: Playoffs
- CLT20: Group stage

The Mumbai Indians (MI) are a franchise cricket team based in Mumbai, India, which plays in the Indian Premier League (IPL). They were one of the nine teams that took part in the 2012 Indian Premier League. They were captained by Harbhajan Singh who had taken over the captaincy from Sachin Tendulkar.

Mumbai Indians reached the Eliminator of playoff stage in the 2012 IPL where they were defeated by the Chennai Super Kings. They qualified for the 2012 Champions League Twenty20, where they crashed out in the group stage.

== Squad ==
- Players with international caps before 2012 IPL are listed in **bold**.

No.	Name	Nationality	Birth date	Batting Style	Bowling Style	Notes
Batsmen
02	Tirumalasetti Suman	India	15 December 1983 (aged 28)	Right-handed	Right-arm off break	
06	Aiden Blizzard	Australia	27 June 1984 (aged 27)	Left-handed	Left-arm medium	Overseas
09	Ambati Rayudu	India	23 September 1985 (aged 26)	Right-handed	Right-arm off break	
10	**Sachin Tendulkar**	India	24 April 1973 (aged 38)	Right-handed	Right-arm leg break	
16	Suryakumar Yadav	India	14 September 1990 (aged 21)	Right-handed	Right-arm medium	
74	**Herschelle Gibbs**	South Africa	23 February 1974 (aged 38)	Right-handed	Right-arm medium	Overseas
77	**Rohit Sharma**	India	30 April 1987 (aged 24)	Right-handed	Right-arm off break	Vice-captain
88	**Richard Levi**	South Africa	15 January 1988 (aged 24)	Right-handed	Right-arm medium	Overseas
–	Jaydev Shah	India	4 May 1983 (aged 28)	Left-handed	Right-arm off break	
All-rounders
01	**Thisara Perera**	Sri Lanka	3 April 1989 (aged 22)	Left-handed	Right-arm medium-fast	Overseas
05	**Robin Peterson**	South Africa	4 August 1979 (aged 32)	Left-handed	Slow left arm orthodox	Overseas
07	**James Franklin**	New Zealand	7 November 1980 (aged 31)	Left-handed	Left-arm medium	Overseas
50	**Dwayne Smith**	Barbados	12 April 1983 (aged 28)	Right-handed	Right-arm medium	Overseas
55	**Kieron Pollard**	Trinidad and Tobago	12 May 1987 (aged 24)	Right-handed	Right arm medium-fast	Overseas
Wicket-keepers
04	Sushant Marathe	India	16 October 1985 (aged 26)	Left-handed	Right-arm leg break	
19	**Dinesh Karthik**	India	1 June 1985 (aged 26)	Right-handed	Right-arm off break	
–	Aditya Tare	India	7 November 1987 (aged 24)	Right-handed	–	
Bowlers
03	**Harbhajan Singh**	India	3 July 1980 (aged 31)	Right-handed	Right-arm off break	Captain
11	**R. P. Singh**	India	6 December 1985 (aged 26)	Right-handed	Left-arm fast-medium	
13	**Munaf Patel**	India	12 July 1983 (aged 28)	Right-handed	Right-arm medium-fast	
14	Abu Nechim	India	5 November 1988 (aged 23)	Right-handed	Right-arm medium-fast	
15	**Clint McKay**	Australia	22 February 1983 (aged 29)	Right-handed	Right arm fast-medium	Overseas
23	Yuzvendra Chahal	India	23 July 1990 (aged 21)	Right-handed	Right-arm leg break	
25	**Mitchell Johnson**	Australia	2 November 1981 (aged 30)	Left-handed	Left-arm fast-medium	Overseas
30	**Pragyan Ojha**	India	5 September 1986 (aged 25)	Left-handed	Slow left arm orthodox	
69	Pawan Suyal	India	15 October 1989 (aged 22)	Right-handed	Left-arm medium-fast	
91	Dhawal Kulkarni	India	10 December 1988 (aged 23)	Right-handed	Right-arm medium-fast	
99	**Lasith Malinga**	Sri Lanka	28 August 1983 (aged 28)	Right-handed	Right-arm fast	Overseas

== Indian Premier League ==
=== Season standings ===
Pos	Team	Pld	W	L	NR	Pts	NRR
1	Delhi Daredevils (3rd)	16	11	5	0	22	0.617
2	Kolkata Knight Riders (C)	16	10	5	1	21	0.561
3	Mumbai Indians (4th)	16	10	6	0	20	−0.100
4	Chennai Super Kings (RU)	16	8	7	1	17	0.100
5	Royal Challengers Bangalore	16	8	7	1	17	−0.022
6	Kings XI Punjab	16	8	8	0	16	−0.216
7	Rajasthan Royals	16	7	9	0	14	0.201
8	Deccan Chargers	16	4	11	1	9	−0.509
9	Pune Warriors India	16	4	12	0	8	−0.551

- The top four teams qualified for the playoffs
- C refers to the eventual winners of the tournament, RU to the runners-up

=== Match log ===
No.	Date	Opponent	Venue	Result	Scorecard
1	April 4	Chennai Super Kings	Chennai	Won by 8 wickets; MoM – Richard Levi 50 (35)	Scorecard
2	April 6	Pune Warriors India	Mumbai	Lost by 28 runs	Scorecard
3	April 9	Deccan Chargers	Visakhapatnam	Won by 5 wickets; MoM – Rohit Sharma 73* (50) and 1 catch	Scorecard
4	April 11	Rajasthan Royals	Mumbai	Won by 27 runs; MoM – Kieron Pollard 64 (33), 4/44 (4 overs) and 1 catch	Scorecard
5	April 16	Delhi Daredevils	Mumbai	Lost by 7 wickets	Scorecard
6	April 22	Kings XI Punjab	Mumbai	Lost by 6 wickets	Scorecard
7	April 25	Kings XI Punjab	Mohali	Won by 4 wickets; MoM – Ambati Rayudu 34* (17)	Scorecard
8	April 27	Delhi Daredevils	New Delhi	Lost by 37 runs	Scorecard
9	April 29	Deccan Chargers	Mumbai	Won by 5 wickets	Scorecard
10	May 3	Pune Warriors India	Pune	Won by 1 run; MoM – Lasith Malinga 2/25 (4 overs) and 14 (14)	Scorecard
11	May 6	Chennai Super Kings	Mumbai	Won by 2 wickets; MoM – Dwayne Smith 24* (9)	Scorecard
12	May 9	Royal Challengers Bangalore	Mumbai	Lost by 9 wickets	Scorecard
13	May 12	Kolkata Knight Riders	Kolkata	Won by 27 runs; MoM – Rohit Sharma 109* (60)	Scorecard
14	May 14	Royal Challengers Bangalore	Bengaluru	Won by 5 wickets; MoM – Ambati Rayudu 81* (54)	Scorecard
15	May 16	Kolkata Knight Riders	Mumbai	Lost by 32 runs	Scorecard
16	May 20	Rajasthan Royals	Jaipur	Won by 10 wickets; MoM – Dwayne Smith 87* (58) & 1 catch	Scorecard
Eliminator
17	May 23	Chennai Super Kings	Bengaluru	Lost by 38 runs	Scorecard
Overall record: 10–7. Advanced to the playoffs.

== Champions League Twenty20 ==
=== Group standings ===
Team	Pld	W	L	NR	Pts	NRR
Sydney Sixers	4	4	0	0	16	+1.656
Highveld Lions	4	3	1	0	12	+0.140
Chennai Super Kings	4	2	2	0	8	−0.049
Mumbai Indians	4	0	3	1	2	−0.471
Yorkshire Carnegie	4	0	3	1	2	−1.791

=== Match log ===
No.	Date	Opponent	Venue	Result	Scorecard
1	October 14	Highveld Lions	Johannesburg	Lost by 8 wickets	Scorecard
2	October 18	Yorkshire	Cape Town	Match did not start after intermittent rain	Scorecard
3	October 20	Chennai Super Kings	Johannesburg	Lost by 6 runs	Scorecard
4	October 22	Sydney Sixers	Durban	Lost by 12 runs	Scorecard
Overall record: 0–3. Did not advance.
