= Sneha Kishore =

Indian cricketer (born 1993)

Personal information
- Born: 31 December 1993 (age 32); Dowleswaram, Andhra Pradesh India
- Batting: Right handed
- Bowling: Slow Left arm orthodox
- Source: Cricinfo, 13 December 2015

Sneha Kishore (born 31 December 1993) is an Indian cricketer who plays for Andhra Pradesh. He made his first-class debut on 23 November 2015 in the 2015–16 Ranji Trophy.
