= Kuldeep Raval =

Indian cricketer (born 1985)

Personal information
- Full name: Kuldeep Chandrakant Raval
- Born: 30 November 1985 (age 40); Muli, Saurashtra, Gujarat, India
- Batting: Left-handed
- Bowling: Slow left-arm orthodox

Domestic team information
- Years: Team
- 2010/11–2014/15: Saurashtra
- List A debut: 11 February 2011 Saurashtra v Maharashtra
- Last List A: 14 November 2014 Saurashtra v Maharashtra
- Twenty20 debut: 21 October 2011 Saurashtra v Maharashtra
- Last Twenty20: 4 April 2014 Saurashtra v Gujarat

Career statistics
Competition	LA	T20
Matches	19	12
Runs scored	288	346
Batting average	18.00	38.44
100s/50s	0/0	0/3
Top score	44	83
Balls bowled	324	78
Wickets	6	7
Bowling average	57.66	11.42
5 wickets in innings	0	0
10 wickets in match	0	0
Best bowling	2/23	3/17
Catches/stumpings	4/0	4/0
- Source: ESPNcricinfo, 18 March 2025

Kuldeep Chandrakant Raval (born 30 November 1985) is an Indian former cricketer who played for Saurashtra. He was born in Muli, Saurashtra, Gujarat. He was bought by Delhi Daredevils for the 2012 Indian Premier League.
