= Sharda Ugra =

Indian sports journalist and author

Sharda Ugra is an Indian sports journalist and author. She has worked for Mid-Day, The Hindu, India Today, and ESPNcricinfo, and is known for her coverage of cricket. She co-wrote John Wright's Indian Summers (2007) and Yuvraj Singh's The Test of My Life (2013), and has conducted investigative reporting on the Board of Control for Cricket in India (BCCI).

== Career ==
In the late 1980s, Ugra and two of her friends interviewed cricketers such as Imran Khan and Viv Richards, which got published in a local Bombay newspaper. She landed a position at Mid-Day in 1989 based in Bombay. Ugra would later work for The Hindu, India Today and ESPNcricinfo. She cowrote John Wright's Indian Summers (2007) and Yuvraj Singh's The Test of My Life (2013).

Ugra published an investigative work on the corruption and underpayment of domestic cricketers by the Board of Control for Cricket in India (BCCI) in 2023.

In 2013, Ugra served as a fellow of the Australia India Institute at the University of Melbourne, where she researched the role of ethnic minority cricket in England and Australia.
