= Munday Dilli ke =

Theme song of the Delhi Daredevils

Munday Dilli ke is the theme song of the Indian Premier League (IPL) franchise Delhi Daredevils (DD). Sung by Jaspreet Jasz, it was launched prior to the 2012 season of the IPL, and was composed by Arijit Datta and Micu Patel. It was launched on DD's official Radio Partner Fever 104 FM. Hemant Dua, marketing head of GMR Sports, the owner of DD, said,"The theme for the song is in keeping with our Dare to Succeed philosophy and a clarion call to all Delhi Daredevils supports to come out and play on the frontfoot," adding,"More importantly, this was commissioned in response to a demand from our supporters to revamp the song." The song took the place of the earlier theme song of the team, Khelo Front Foot pe, sung by Kailash Kher. The song received positive replies from DD supporters, expressing "their delight at the lively new song" at the Facebook and Twitter pages of DD. Datta said,"The manner in which the song has panned out made us realise that we were sitting on something big. The song has an urban, in your face, touch to it, with the dhol adding a Punjabi flavor." Jaz said,"I have followed the response to the song and feel humbled by the overwhelming show of support already."
