= Sunny Gupta =

Indian cricketer (born 1988)

Personal information
- Full name: Sunny Gupta
- Born: 27 September 1988 (age 38); Jamshedpur, India
- Batting: Right-handed
- Bowling: Right-arm offbreak
- Role: All-rounder

Domestic team information
- Years: Team
- 2003–2018: Tamil Nadu cricket team
- 2012: Delhi Daredevils

Career statistics
Competition	FC	LA	T20
Matches	51	16	17
Runs scored	907	139	54
Batting average	14.17	15.44	6.75
100s/50s	0/3	0/0	0/0
Top score	62	26	22
Balls bowled	8,926	706	266
Wickets	123	15	8
Bowling average	38.21	35.00	38.12
5 wickets in innings	2	0	0
10 wickets in match	0	0	0
Best bowling	6/93	3/28	2/15
Catches/stumpings	30/–	6/–	3/–
- Source: ESPNcricinfo, 1 March 2025

Sunny Gupta (born 27 September 1988) is an Indian cricketer from Jamshedpur, Bihar. He is a right-handed batsman and a right-arm offbreak bowler. He played for Tamil Nadu in Ranji Trophy and played for Delhi Daredevils in the Indian Premier League.

== Life ==
Gupta studied at Inderprastha University in Chennai and continued his further education at Loyola College, Chennai.
