= Mandeep Singh =

Indian cricketer

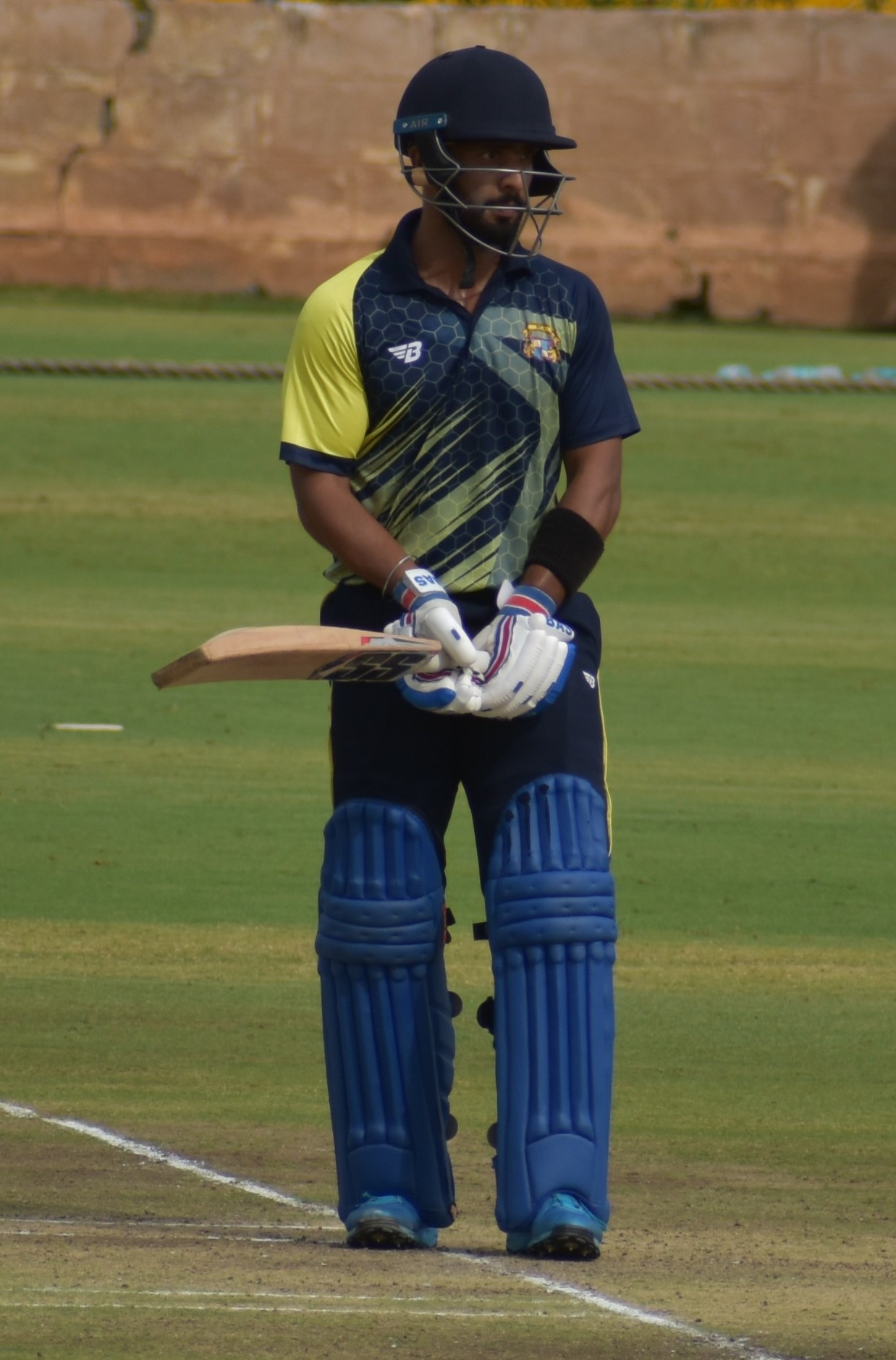
- Mandeep during the 2019–20 Vijay Hazare Trophy

Personal information
- Born: 18 December 1991 (age 34); Jalandhar, Punjab, India
- Nickname: Mandy
- Batting: Right-handed
- Bowling: Right-arm medium
- Role: All-rounder

International information
- National side: India (2016)
- T20I debut (cap 62): 18 June 2016 v Zimbabwe
- Last T20I: 22 June 2016 v Zimbabwe
- T20I shirt no.: 23

Domestic team information
- Years: Team
- 2010–present: Punjab
- 2010, 2023: Kolkata Knight Riders
- 2011–2014, 2019–2021: Kings XI Punjab (squad no. 23)
- 2015–2018: Royal Challengers Bangalore (squad no. 9)
- 2022: Delhi Capitals

Career statistics
Competition	T20I	FC	LA	T20
Matches	3	105	137	214
Runs scored	87	6,965	4,180	4,043
Batting average	43.50	49.75	37.65	27.88
100s/50s	0/1	16/39	4/31	0/21
Top score	52*	235	119	99*
Balls bowled	–	710	579	363
Wickets	–	3	16	16
Bowling average	–	127.33	33.43	27.93
5 wickets in innings	–	0	0	0
10 wickets in match	–	0	0	0
Best bowling	–	1/1	2/3	3/21
Catches/stumpings	1/–	74/–	60/–	79/–
- Source: ESPNcricinfo, 4 March 2025

Mandeep Singh (born 18 December 1991) is an Indian cricketer. He plays for Punjab in the top-flight of Indian cricket. Ahead of India's 2024-25 domestic season, he moved to Tripura. A right-hand batsman who occasionally bowls right arm medium pace, Mandeep has also played for India Blue, and North Zone and for teams in the Indian Premier League. He was the vice-captain of the India under-19 cricket team for the 2010 Under-19 World Cup.

On 18 July 2012, he was among the 30 probables named for the World T20 tournament to be played in Sri Lanka in September 2012. However, he was not selected in the final 15-member squad.

He made his Twenty20 International (T20I) debut against Zimbabwe at Harare Sports Club on 18 June 2016.

== Domestic career ==
In the 2012 season of IPL, Mandeep scored 432 runs from 16 matches, including two half-centuries, and ended the tournament as Kings XI Punjab's leading run-scorer. He was also adjudged the winner of "Rising Star of the tournament Award".

He was the highest run scorer in 2015 Vijay Hazare Trophy. On the back of his form in the tournament, he was selected for 2015 tour of Zimbabwe.

In January 2018, he was bought by the Royal Challengers Bangalore in the 2018 IPL auction. In 2019, he was again bought by Kings XI Punjab and he was retained by the team for IPL 2021 after recently concluded IPL 2020. In February 2022, he was bought by the Delhi Capitals in the auction for the 2022 Indian Premier League tournament.

He was one of the most consistent run scorers in the latest editions of Ranji Trophy after missing 2017–18 season. He scored 602 runs in 2018–19, 696 runs in 2019–20, 376 runs in 2021–22 and 463 runs in 2022–23. He averaged more than 50 in each year with a cumulative average of 64.76 in this period. Despite this golden patch in his peak age, he was never called up to India national cricket team or called back to India A cricket team.

He represented Tripura for one season, in 2024–25. He also captained them across formats that season. After just one season, he left Tripura.

== Personal life ==
Mandeep's father was an athletics coach in Jalandhar. He was initially not happy with his son's cricketing ambition but was later satisfied when he saw his son's cricketing potential.

Mandeep married Jagdeep Jaswal in 2016. Their son Rajveer Singh was born on 16 January 2021.
