= 2012 Chennai Super Kings season =

Chennai Super Kings
2012 season
- Coach: Stephen Fleming
- Captain: Mahendra Singh Dhoni
- IPL: Runners-up
- CLT20: Group stage
- Most runs: Suresh Raina (441)
- Most wickets: Dwayne Bravo (15)
- Most catches: Suresh Raina (11)
- Most wicket-keeping dismissals: MS Dhoni (14)

Chennai Super Kings (CSK) is a franchise cricket team based in Chennai, India, which plays in the Indian Premier League (IPL). They were one of the nine teams that competed in the 2012 Indian Premier League. They were defeated by the Kolkata Knight Riders in the final at Chennai. Thus, they qualified for the 2012 Champions League Twenty20 where they could not progress past the group stage.

They were captained for the fifth season in succession by Indian skipper Mahendra Singh Dhoni. The Super Kings had emerged IPL champions in both 2010 and 2011 under his captaincy.

== Pre-season player signings ==
At the 2012 players auction, the team bought Ravindra Jadeja for $2 million (₹ 97.2 million), the bid which turned out to be the biggest draw in the players' auction for the fifth edition of the Indian Premier League. They also bought out the contract of Tim Southee who was signed as a replacement player in the previous season.

== Squad ==
Players with international caps before the start of the 2012 IPL season are listed in bold.

No.	Name	Nationality	Birth date	Batting style	Bowling style	Notes
Batsmen
03	**Suresh Raina**	India	27 November 1986 (aged 25)	Left-handed	Right-arm off break	Vice-captain
05	**George Bailey**	Australia	7 September 1982 (aged 29)	Right-handed	Right arm medium	Overseas
08	**Murali Vijay**	India	1 April 1984 (aged 28)	Right-handed	Right-arm off break	
13	**Francois du Plessis**	South Africa	13 July 1984 (aged 27)	Right-handed	Right-arm leg break	Overseas
33	**Subramaniam Badrinath**	India	30 August 1980 (aged 31)	Right-handed	Right-arm off break	
35	K. Vasudevadas	India	26 January 1985 (aged 27)	Left-handed	Right-arm leg break	
48	**Michael Hussey**	Australia	27 May 1975 (aged 36)	Left-handed	Right-arm medium	Overseas
77	Anirudha Srikkanth	India	14 April 1987 (aged 24)	Right-handed	Right-arm off break	
90	**Abhinav Mukund**	India	6 January 1990 (aged 22)	Left-handed	Right-arm leg break	
All-rounders
12	**Ravindra Jadeja**	India	6 December 1988 (age 37)	Left-handed	Slow left arm orthodox	
47	**Dwayne Bravo**	Trinidad and Tobago	7 October 1983 (aged 28)	Right-handed	Right-arm medium-fast	Overseas
56	**Scott Styris**	New Zealand	10 July 1975 (aged 36)	Right-handed	Right-arm medium	Overseas
81	**Albie Morkel**	South Africa	10 June 1981 (aged 30)	Left-handed	Right arm medium-fast	Overseas
–	Ganapathi Vignesh	India	11 September 1981 (aged 30)	Right-handed	Right arm medium-fast	
Wicket-keepers
06	**Wriddhiman Saha**	India	24 October 1984 (aged 27)	Right-handed	–	
07	**Mahendra Singh Dhoni**	India	7 July 1981 (aged 30)	Right-handed	Right-arm medium	Captain
Bowlers
04	**Doug Bollinger**	Australia	24 July 1981 (aged 30)	Left-handed	Left-arm fast-medium	Overseas
09	Yo Mahesh	India	21 December 1987 (aged 24)	Right-handed	Right-arm medium-fast	
17	**Sudeep Tyagi**	India	19 September 1987 (aged 24)	Right-handed	Right-arm medium-fast	
23	**Joginder Sharma**	India	23 October 1983 (aged 28)	Right-handed	Right-arm fast-medium	
27	Shadab Jakati	India	27 November 1980 (aged 31)	Left-handed	Slow left arm orthodox	
88	**Suraj Randiv**	Sri Lanka	30 January 1985 (aged 27)	Right-handed	Right-arm off break	Overseas
92	**Nuwan Kulasekara**	Sri Lanka	22 July 1982 (aged 29)	Right-handed	Right-arm fast-medium	Overseas
99	**Ravichandran Ashwin**	India	17 September 1986 (aged 25)	Right-handed	Right-arm off break	

== Indian Premier League ==
The Super Kings started their IPL 2012 campaign with an 8-wicket loss to Mumbai Indians in the tournament opener in Chennai. CSK were bundled out for 112 before Richard Levi struck a fifty to set up the victory for the visiting team. Ravindra Jadeja came up with a match-winning all-round performance (48 off 29, 5/16) to help his team to a resounding 74-run win over Deccan Chargers in their second home game. In their first away game of the season, the Super Kings lost to Delhi Daredevils by 8 wickets after a poor show by the batsmen. Their win against Royal Challengers Bangalore was made possible by Albie Morkel, who scored 28 runs from the 19th over bowled by Virat Kohli, and Jadeja who hit a boundary off the last ball of the match to see his side chase down the target of 206. South African Francois du Plessis was adjudged Man of the match for his innings of 71. At Pune, after restricting the Super Kings to 155, Jesse Ryder and Steve Smith took the Pune Warriors home with four balls to spare to hand a third defeat to CSK in five games. However they beat the same opponents at home by 13 runs after du Plessis and Subramaniam Badrinath scored fifties in the first innings. du Plessis struck another half-century (73 off 52) to take Chennai to their second consecutive win. Their next game, which was supposed to be played at Bangalore against the Royal Challengers, was washed out without a ball bowled due to rain. They suffered a home defeat against Kings XI Punjab after they failed to chase the target of 157. KXIP's Mandeep Singh was awarded the Man of the match for his innings of 56. They lost another home game by 5 wickets to Kolkata Knight Riders whose run chase was anchored by skipper Gautam Gambhir's half-century. Chennai got back to winning ways with a 10-run win over the struggling Deccan Chargers despite a fighting knock by the Chargers' vice-captain Cameron White. The Super Kings then lost to Mumbai Indians off the last ball of the match. Dwayne Smith, who was playing his first match of the season for Mumbai, hit 14 runs off the last three balls bowled by Ben Hilfenhaus to take his team to a dramatic victory. The loss severely dented CSK's chances of progressing to the Playoffs. In another thrilling match, Chennai beat Rajasthan Royals by four wickets mainly due to cameos by Albie Morkel and Anirudha Srikkanth, each of them scoring unbeaten six-ball 18. In their last home match of the league stage, Chennai comprehensively beat the Delhi Daredevils by nine wickets. Against Kolkata Knight Riders, needing five to win on the last ball for CSK, Dwayne Bravo hit a six over long-on off the bowling of Rajat Bhatia to take the Super Kings to a 5-wicket win. Needing a win in their last league match to assure their place in the Playoffs, the Super Kings lost to Kings XI Punjab by 7 wickets at Dharamsala. However, Royal Challengers Bangalore and Chennai Super Kings, both ended up with 17 points from 16 games, but the latter managed to get the fourth spot on the points table due to a better net run rate.

The Super Kings played Mumbai Indians in the Eliminator at Bangalore. After losing two early wickets, Hussey and Badrinath shared a 94-run third-wicket partnership to take the team to a respectable position. Then, the skipper MS Dhoni and Dwayne Bravo scored 73 runs in the last five overs to set up a score of 187/5 in 20 overs. Mumbai in their run-chase got off to a brisk start before a dramatic batting collapse. CSK spinners Ashwin and Jakati picked up one wicket each and bowled seven economical overs between them that proved decisive in the context of the match. CSK won the match by 38 runs and Dhoni was given the Man of the Match for his innings of 51* (20). The win took them to the second Qualifier at Chennai, a match against Delhi Daredevils, to decide who plays in the final. Daredevils won the toss and put Chennai into bat and this decision backfired. Opener Murali Vijay, who had a quiet season until then, came to his own striking a century (113 runs from 60 deliveries, 15 fours and four sixes) to take his team to 222/5. The bowlers backed up the good batting by bowling tight line and length and picking up wickets at regular intervals. Only Mahela Jayawardene showed some resistance for Delhi with a knock of 55 but to see his team lose by 86 runs. The win booked CSK's place in the final at their home ground Chennai against the Kolkata Knight Riders. This was the fourth time in five seasons, that CSK had made it to the final of the IPL.

Chennai elected to bat in the final after winning the toss. After a solid opening partnership between Hussey and Vijay, Suresh Raina played his best innings of the season scoring an unbeaten 38-ball 73. Chennai went on to make 190/3 in 20 overs. Kolkata lost the wicket of their skipper Gambhir in the first over of the run-chase. Then Manvinder Bisla, who was playing his first game in two weeks, took on the bowlers single-handedly and scored 89 from 48 balls. Batting at three, Jacques Kallis not only scored 69 (49) but also put up a crucial second-wicket stand of 136 runs with Bisla. However, the game swung CSK's way after KKR lost four wickets in as many overs. After the fall of Kallis in the 19th over, KKR needed 16 runs to win from 7 balls. KKR went on to win the game by five wickets with two balls to spare thanks to two consecutive boundaries from Manoj Tiwary in the last over. The Knight Riders secured their maiden IPL title with this win and Bisla won the Man of the Match award.

Suresh Raina finished as Chennai's leading run scorer with 441 runs. Dwayne Bravo lead the bowling tables with 15 wickets.

=== Match log ===
No.	Date	Opponent	Venue	Result	Scorecard
1	4 April	Mumbai Indians	Chennai	Lost by 8 wickets	Scorecard
2	7 April	Deccan Chargers	Visakhapatnam	Won by 74 runs, MoM – Ravindra Jadeja 48 (29) and 5/16 (4 overs)	Scorecard
3	10 April	Delhi Daredevils	New Delhi	Lost by 8 wickets	Scorecard
4	12 April	Royal Challengers Bangalore	Chennai	Won by 5 wickets, MoM – Francois du Plessis 71 (46)	Scorecard
5	14 April	Pune Warriors India	Pune	Lost by 7 wickets	Scorecard
6	19 April	Pune Warriors India	Chennai	Won By 13 runs, MoM – Nuwan Kulasekara 2/10 and 2 catches	Scorecard
7	21 April	Rajasthan Royals	Chennai	Won by 7 wickets, MoM – Francois du Plessis 73 (52)	Scorecard
8	25 April	Royal Challengers Bangalore	Bengaluru	Match Abandoned without a ball bowled due to rain	Scorecard
9	28 April	Kings XI Punjab	Chennai	Lost by 7 runs	Scorecard
10	30 April	Kolkata Knight Riders	Chennai	Lost by 5 wickets	Scorecard
11	4 May	Deccan Chargers	Chennai	Won by 10 runs, MoM – Suresh Raina 32 (24) and 1/5	Scorecard
12	6 May	Mumbai Indians	Mumbai	Lost by 2 wickets	Scorecard
13	10 May	Rajasthan Royals	Jaipur	Won by 4 wickets, MoM – Ben Hilfenhaus 2/8	Scorecard
14	12 May	Delhi Daredevils	Chennai	Won by 9 wickets, MoM – Ben Hilfenhaus 3/27	Scorecard
15	14 May	Kolkata Knight Riders	Kolkata	Won by 5 wickets, MoM – Mike Hussey 56 (39)	Scorecard
16	17 May	Kings XI Punjab	Dharamsala	Lost by 7 wickets	Scorecard
17	23 May	Mumbai Indians (Eliminator)	Bengaluru	Won by 38 runs, MoM – Mahendra Singh Dhoni 53* (20)	Scorecard
18	25 May	Delhi Daredevils (Qualifier #2)	Chennai	Won by 86 runs, MoM – Murali Vijay 113 (58)	Scorecard
19	27 May	Kolkata Knight Riders (Final)	Chennai	Lost by 5 wickets	Scorecard
Overall record: 10–8. Runners-up. Qualified for 2012 Champions League Twenty20

=== Most runs ===
Player	Innings	Runs	Average	Strike rate	Highest Score	100s	50s
Suresh Raina	18	441	25.94	135.69	73	0	1
Francois du Plessis	12	398	33.16	118.84	73	0	3
Dwayne Bravo	16	371	46.37	140.53	48	0	0
MS Dhoni	17	357	29.75	128.41	51*	0	1
Murali Vijay	14	336	25.84	125.84	113	1	0

=== Most wickets ===
Player	Innings	Wickets	Average	Economy rate	Best Bowling	4w
Dwayne Bravo	18	15	30.80	8.01	2/10	0
Ravichandran Ashwin	18	14	30.78	6.54	3/23	0
Ben Hilfenhaus	9	14	16.64	6.85	3/27	0
Albie Morkel	15	13	29.61	7.77	3/29	0
Ravindra Jadeja	14	12	22.75	7.80	5/16	1

== Champions League Twenty20 ==
=== Match log ===
Date	Opponent	Venue	Result	Scorecard
14 October	Sydney Sixers	Johannesburg	Lost by 14 runs	Scorecard
16 October	Highveld Lions	Cape Town	Lost by 6 wickets	Scorecard
20 October	Mumbai Indians	Johannesburg	Won by 6 runs, MoM – Ben Hilfenhaus 2/14 (4 overs)	Scorecard
22 October	Yorkshire Carnegie	Durban	Won by 4 wickets, MoM – Subramaniam Badrinath 47 (38)	Scorecard
Overall record: 2–2. Eliminated in the group stage.

=== Most runs ===
Player	Innings	Runs	Average	Strike rate	Highest Score	100s	50s
Francois du Plessis	4	121	30.25	147.56	52	0	1
Suresh Raina	4	116	29.00	134.88	57	0	1
MS Dhoni	4	108	27.00	142.10	35	0	0

=== Most wickets ===
Player	Innings	Wickets	Average	Economy rate	Best Bowling	4w
Albie Morkel	3	5	15.00	6.52	2/12	0
Doug Bollinger	4	4	24.75	6.18	2/16	0
Ben Hilfenhaus	4	4	24.25	6.46	2/14	0

== See also ==
- Delhi Daredevils in 2012
