= 2011 Chennai Super Kings season =

Indian Premier League cricket team season

Chennai Super Kings
2011 season
- Coach: Stephen Fleming
- Captain: Mahendra Singh Dhoni
- IPL: Champions
- CLT20: Group stage
- Most runs: Mike Hussey (495)
- Most wickets: Ravichandran Ashwin (25)
- Most catches: Shadab Jakati (9)
- Most wicket-keeping dismissals: Mahendra Singh Dhoni (10)

Chennai Super Kings were one of the ten teams that took part in the 2011 Indian Premier League. They were captained for the fourth season in succession by Indian skipper Mahendra Singh Dhoni. The Super Kings had won both 2010 Indian Premier League and 2010 Champions League Twenty20 under Dhoni's captaincy.

The Super Kings completed a hat-trick of titles by winning the 2011 Indian Premier League. Thus, they became the first team in the history of IPL to successfully defend their title. They also won all the matches held at their home ground in Chennai that season and created a new record of becoming the first IPL team to win all of its home games. With this, they earned a direct qualification for the main event of 2011 Champions League Twenty20 where they could not replicate similar consistency before crashing out of the event in the group stages.

== Background ==
Chennai had a highly successful 2010 season where they emerged victorious in both Indian Premier League as well as Champions League Twenty20. However, with the addition of two more teams in the IPL for the 2011 season, it was declared by the IPL Governing Council that each franchise can retain a maximum of four players of their squad for the 2011 season, only three of whom can be Indian players, and the rest of the international players would be put in the mega-auction. The spending power for each franchise at the mega-auction was restricted to $9 million. The player retention clause also stated that if a franchise decides to retain four players, $4.5 million will be charged, leaving the franchise with only $4.5 million to spend at the auction.

The Chennai franchise, keen to have the same set of core players, decided to retain the maximum number of players through the retention process. CSK retained captain MS Dhoni, vice-captain Suresh Raina, Murali Vijay and Albie Morkel for a total of $4.5 million. This left them with the power of spending only $4.5 million at the mega-auction. At the mega-auction which was held on 8 and 9 January 2011 in Bangalore, the Chennai franchise could successfully bid for 14 players, eight of whom were part of their 2010 squad.

Chennai Super Kings also managed to get back three domestic players who had been a part of their team in the first three years in Shadab Jakati, Anirudha Srikkanth and Abhinav Mukund. Apart from these three, they also signed contracts with Tamil Nadu players Yo Mahesh, K. Vasudevadas and Ganapathi Vignesh.

Before the start of the IPL season, CSK signed up New Zealand pacer Tim Southee as a replacement to Ben Hilfenhaus who was ruled out of the tournament due to an injury. They also appointed former Australian fast bowler Andy Bichel as their bowling coach, replacing Venkatesh Prasad who moved to the newly formed Kochi Tuskers Kerala franchise. Bichel had previously worked as Kolkata Knight Riders' bowling coach in 2009 before getting sacked after the team's disastrous season.

=== List of players bought at the auction ===
Player	Cost
MS Dhoni (retained)	$1,800,000
Suresh Raina (retained)	$1,300,000
Murali Vijay (retained)	$900,000
Albie Morkel (retained)	$500,000
Michael Hussey	$425,000
Wriddhiman Saha	$100,000
Dwayne Bravo	$200,000
Doug Bollinger	$700,000
Ravichandran Ashwin	$850,000
Subramaniam Badrinath	$850,000
Scott Styris	$200,000
Ben Hilfenhaus	$100,000
Joginder Sharma	$150,000
Nuwan Kulasekara	$100,000
Sudeep Tyagi	$240,000
Suraj Randiv	$80,000
George Bailey	$50,000
Francois du Plessis	$120,000

== Squad ==
Players with international caps before the start of the 2011 IPL season are listed in bold.

No.	Name	Nationality	Birth date	Batting style	Bowling style	Notes
Batsmen
03	**Suresh Raina**	India	27 November 1986 (aged 24)	Left-handed	Right-arm off break	Vice-captain
05	George Bailey	Australia	7 September 1982 (aged 28)	Right-handed	Right arm medium	Overseas
08	**Murali Vijay**	India	1 April 1984 (aged 27)	Right-handed	Right-arm off break	
13	**Francois du Plessis**	South Africa	13 July 1984 (aged 26)	Right-handed	Right-arm leg break	Overseas
33	**Subramaniam Badrinath**	India	30 August 1980 (aged 30)	Right-handed	Right-arm off break	
35	K. Vasudevadas	India	26 January 1985 (aged 26)	Left-handed	Right-arm leg break	
48	**Michael Hussey**	Australia	27 May 1975 (aged 35)	Left-handed	Right-arm medium	Overseas
77	Anirudha Srikkanth	India	14 April 1987 (aged 23)	Right-handed	Right-arm off break	
90	Abhinav Mukund	India	6 January 1990 (aged 21)	Left-handed	Right-arm leg break	
All-rounders
47	**Dwayne Bravo**	Trinidad and Tobago	7 October 1983 (aged 27)	Right-handed	Right-arm medium-fast	Overseas
56	**Scott Styris**	New Zealand	10 July 1975 (aged 35)	Right-handed	Right-arm medium	Overseas
81	**Albie Morkel**	South Africa	10 June 1981 (aged 29)	Left-handed	Right arm medium-fast	Overseas
24	Ganapathi Vignesh	India	11 September 1981 (aged 29)	Right-handed	Right arm medium-fast	.
Wicket-keepers
06	**Wriddhiman Saha**	India	24 October 1984 (aged 26)	Right-handed	–	
07	**Mahendra Singh Dhoni**	India	7 July 1981 (aged 29)	Right-handed	Right-arm medium	Captain
Bowlers
04	**Doug Bollinger**	Australia	24 July 1981 (aged 29)	Left-handed	Left-arm fast-medium	Overseas
09	Yo Mahesh	India	21 December 1987 (aged 23)	Right-handed	Right-arm medium-fast	
17	**Sudeep Tyagi**	India	19 September 1987 (aged 23)	Right-handed	Right-arm medium-fast	
23	**Joginder Sharma**	India	23 October 1983 (aged 27)	Right-handed	Right-arm fast-medium	
27	Shadab Jakati	India	27 November 1980 (aged 30)	Left-handed	Slow left arm orthodox	
38	**Tim Southee**	New Zealand	11 December 1988 (aged 22)	Right-handed	Right arm fast-medium	Overseas
88	**Suraj Randiv**	Sri Lanka	30 January 1985 (aged 26)	Right-handed	Right-arm off break	Overseas
92	**Nuwan Kulasekara**	Sri Lanka	22 July 1982 (aged 28)	Right-handed	Right-arm fast-medium	Overseas
99	**Ravichandran Ashwin**	India	17 September 1986 (aged 24)	Right-handed	Right-arm off break	

== Indian Premier League ==
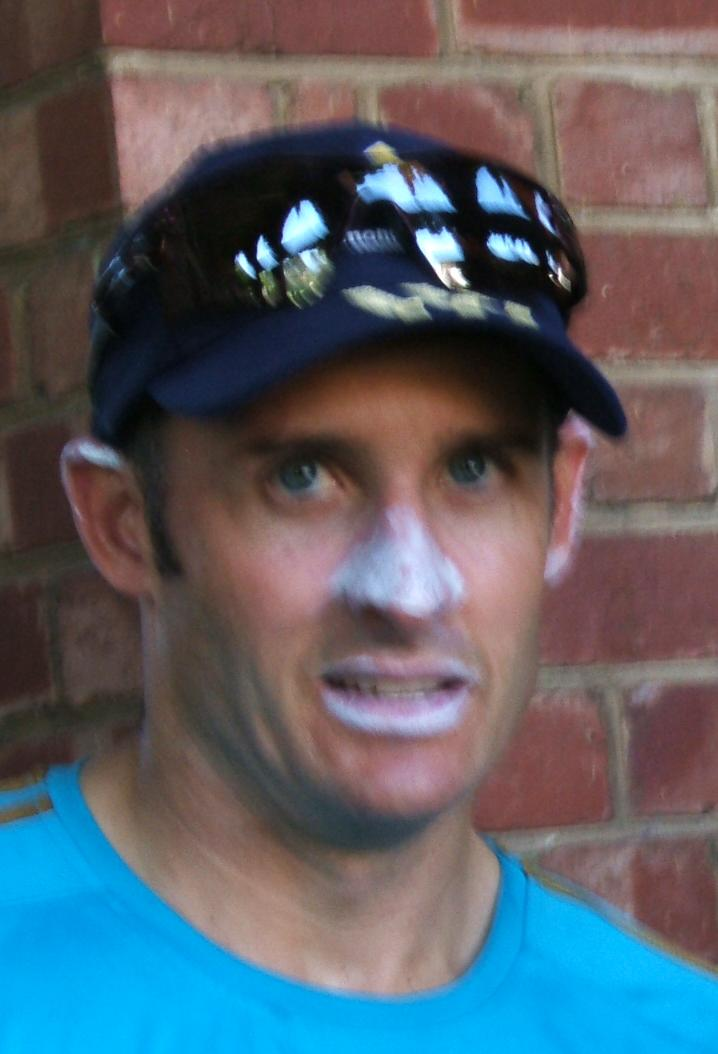
Michael Hussey took over from the retired Matthew Hayden as CSK's opener in 2011.

The Super Kings started their IPL 2011 campaign with a two-run win against the Kolkata Knight Riders in Chennai. Opener Anirudha Srikkanth won the Man of the match for scoring 64. But the Super Kings lost their second game of the season to the Kings XI Punjab, despite setting KXIP a target of 189, after Punjab's Paul Valthaty hit the first century of the season (an unbeaten 62-ball 120). Michael Hussey's 83* took them to a comfortable win over the Royal Challengers Bangalore before a defeat at the hands of the Kochi Tuskers Kerala in a rain-affected match at the latter's home ground. This match was followed by another close match against Mumbai Indians, which the Super Kings lost by 8 runs. Mumbai's spinner Harbhajan Singh achieved his career-best T20 figures of 5/18 in 4 overs during the match. However, in their next match at home against Pune Warriors India, Michael Hussey scored a half-century and the bowlers bowled economically to defend a total of 142. Two days later, against the same team in an away match, a spell of 3/21 by the Man of the match Doug Bollinger and a match-winning partnership between Subramaniam Badrinath and Suresh Raina saw the Super Kings complete a double over the Pune team. Against the Deccan Chargers, they registered their third straight win thanks to the all-round effort of Albie Morkel who took three wickets and then scored 19 from just 6 deliveries. Bollinger and Jakati also picked up two wickets each and bowled economically which helped them to overcome a quickfire half-century from the Chargers' opener Sunny Sohal. They secured their fifth straight home victory in their next match against the Rajasthan Royals. Chasing a modest target of 148, Hussey, who struck 79* off just 55 balls, and Raina, 61* off 51 balls, put on an unbeaten century partnership to take Chennai to a comfortable eight-wicket win. This was followed by a defeat to the Kolkata Knight Riders in a rain-affected match at the Eden Gardens. A couple of days later, their batting came good in an away game against the Rajasthan Royals at Jaipur, where all the top-four batsmen scored 40-plus runs helping them win by 63 runs. The Chennai Super Kings extended their unbeaten home record by defeating the Delhi Daredevils and moving to the top of the table. MS Dhoni won the Man of the match for his knock of 63* (31), which was supported by Badrinath who also struck a half-century. The Super Kings played their last home game against the Kochi Tuskers Kerala and won it by eleven runs. Wriddhiman Saha top-scored for CSK with a resilient 46*. With this win, they created a new record of becoming the first team to win all their home matches in the history of the Indian Premier League. They faced the toppers of the points table, Royal Challengers Bangalore in their final league game at Bangalore. Dhoni's innings of 70* (40) was responsible for Chennai's total of 128/8 which was chased down with ease by the home side with Chris Gayle scoring an unbeaten half-century. The Super Kings finished second on the league table with 18 points from 14 matches as they had a better net run rate than the Mumbai Indians who also had the same number of points.

The Chennai team faced the table-toppers Royal Challengers in the first Qualifier at the Wankhede Stadium in Mumbai. Dhoni, who won the toss, asked RCB to bat first. RCB lost Chris Gayle early but managed to put on 175 on board riding on an unbeaten 70 by Virat Kohli. Chennai's run-chase got off to a disastrous start as both the openers were dismissed within the second over. But then, Suresh Raina put on crucial fifty-run partnerships with Badrinath and Dhoni, taking CSK closer to the target. But after the dismissal of Dhoni, 45 was required from 20 deliveries and a victory seemed improbable. Then Albie Morkel hit 28* from just 10 deliveries which took the Super Kings to a six-wicket win with two balls to spare. Raina won the Man of the match for his unbeaten 73. The win took them to the finals which was to be played at their home ground. This was the third time in four seasons that they had entered the finals of the IPL. They met the same team, Royal Challengers Bangalore at the final, after RCB defeated the Mumbai Indians in the second Qualifier. CSK won the toss once again, this time elected to bat first. They got off to a brisk start as openers Michael Hussey and Murali Vijay shared a record first-wicket partnership of 159 runs before Hussey got out for 63. Vijay continued his big hitting and struck four fours and six sixes in his innings of 95. Chennai ended their 20 overs on 202/5, which was the highest total at the venue in that season. R Ashwin struck in the very first over of the RCB innings, removing Gayle for a duck. The Super Kings bowlers kept picking up wickets regularly in the innings and eventually won the game by 63 runs and were crowned champions for the second time in succession. Murali Vijay was declared the Man of the Match for his match-winning innings.

Thus, the 2011 season ended up as Chennai's most successful season because, not only did they successfully defend the title, but also assert their dominance in the league with a win percentage of 64.11, their highest in four seasons. They maintained an absolute home record in the season and became the first team to win the tournament at home. They also won the Fairplay Award for the third time in four years.

=== Season standings ===
Pos	Grp	Team	Pld	W	L	NR	Pts	NRR
1	B	Royal Challengers Bangalore (R)	14	9	4	1	19	0.326
2	B	Chennai Super Kings (C)	14	9	5	0	18	0.443
3	A	Mumbai Indians (3)	14	9	5	0	18	0.040
4	B	Kolkata Knight Riders (4)	14	8	6	0	16	0.433
5	A	Kings XI Punjab	14	7	7	0	14	−0.051
6	B	Rajasthan Royals	14	6	7	1	13	−0.691
7	A	Deccan Chargers	14	6	8	0	12	0.222
8	B	Kochi Tuskers Kerala	14	6	8	0	12	−0.214
9	A	Pune Warriors India	14	4	9	1	9	−0.134
10	A	Delhi Daredevils	14	4	9	1	9	−0.448

Source: ESPNcricinfo

Note: Top four teams qualified for the playoffs.
The top three teams also qualified for the Champions League Twenty20 while the fourth team played in the qualifying stage.

=== Match log ===
No.	Date	Opponent	Venue	Result	Scorecard Link
1	8 April	Kolkata Knight Riders	Chennai	Won by 2 runs, MoM – Anirudha Srikkanth 64 (55)	Scorecard
2	13 April	Kings XI Punjab	Mohali	Lost by 6 wickets	Scorecard
3	16 April	Royal Challengers Bangalore	Chennai	Won by 21 runs, MoM – Michael Hussey 83* (56)	Scorecard
4	18 April	Kochi Tuskers Kerala	Kochi	Lost by 7 wickets	Scorecard
5	22 April	Mumbai Indians	Mumbai	Lost by 8 runs	Scorecard
6	25 April	Pune Warriors India	Chennai	Won by 25 runs, MoM – Michael Hussey 61 (48)	Scorecard
7	27 April	Pune Warriors India	Navi Mumbai	Won by 8 wickets, MoM – Doug Bollinger 3/21 (4 overs)	Scorecard
8	1 May	Deccan Chargers	Chennai	Won by 19 runs, MoM – Albie Morkel 19 (6) and 3/38 (4 overs)	Scorecard
9	4 May	Rajasthan Royals	Chennai	Won by 8 wickets, MoM – Michael Hussey 79* (55)	Scorecard
10	7 May	Kolkata Knight Riders	Kolkata	Lost by 10 runs	Scorecard
11	9 May	Rajasthan Royals	Jaipur	Won by 63 runs, MoM – Murali Vijay 53 (40)	Scorecard
12	12 May	Delhi Daredevils	Chennai	Won by 18 runs, MoM – Mahendra Singh Dhoni 63* (31)	Scorecard
13	18 May	Kochi Tuskers Kerala	Chennai	Won by 11 runs, MoM – Wriddhiman Saha 46* (33)	Scorecard
14	22 May	Royal Challengers Bangalore	Bangalore	Lost by 8 wickets	Scorecard
15	24 May	Royal Challengers Bangalore (Qualifier #1)	Mumbai	Won by 6 wickets, MoM – Suresh Raina 73* (50)	Scorecard
16	28 May	Royal Challengers Bangalore (Final)	Chennai	Won by 58 runs, MoM – Murali Vijay 95 (52)	Scorecard
Overall record: 11– 5. Champions. Qualified for 2011 Champions League Twenty20

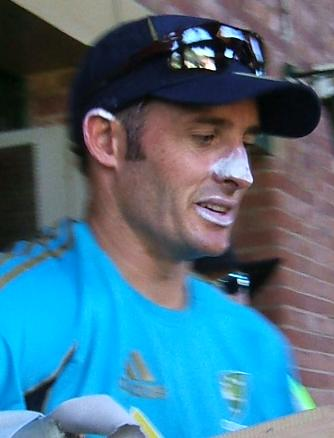
Hussey scored the most runs for CSK

=== Most runs ===
Player	Innings	Runs	Average	Strike rate	Highest Score		50s
Michael Hussey	14	492	41.00	118.84	83*	0	4
Suresh Raina	16	438	31.28	134.76	73*	0	4
Murali Vijay	16	434	27.12	128.02	95	0	3
Subramaniam Badrinath	13	396	56.57	126.51	71*	0	5
MS Dhoni	13	392	43.55	158.70	70*	0	2

=== Most wickets ===
Player	Innings	Wickets	Average	Economy rate	Best Bowling	4w
Ravichandran Ashwin	16	20	19.40	6.15	3/16	0
Doug Bollinger	13	17	19.35	7.00	3/21	0
Albie Morkel	14	15	25.46	8.48	3/29	0
Shadab Jakati	14	10	33.60	7.60	2/21	0
Dwayne Bravo	6	6	26.16	7.85	2/21	0

== Champions League Twenty20 ==
After finishing as the 2011 Indian Premier League champions, the team qualified for the 2011 Champions League Twenty20. They had previously qualified for the 2008 Season which was subsequently cancelled and also the 2010 Season which they went on to become the Champions.

Starting as the defending champions, the Super Kings faced IPL rivals Mumbai Indians in their first game. Mumbai won the close match mainly due to Lasith Malinga's batting performances towards the end. Chennai were involved in another close match and ended up victorious against the South African side of Cape Cobras with a man of the match performance from Dwayne Bravo. However Chennai's lost their next match to Trinidad and Tobago. CSK then faced the 2009 champions NSW Blues in a must-win encounter. CSK were eliminated after a decisive win for the visitors who were led by a hundred from David Warner.

In the end, Chennai finished at the bottom of the Group with just 2 points while IPL counterparts Mumbai Indians and NSW Blues proceeded to the knockout phase.

=== Season standings ===
Group A
Team	Pld	W	L	NR	Pts	NRR
New South Wales Blues	4	3	1	0	6	+0.627
Mumbai Indians	4	2	1	1	5	–0.280
Trinidad and Tobago Red Steel	4	2	2	0	4	+0.176
Cape Cobras	4	1	2	1	3	+0.229
Chennai Super Kings	4	1	3	0	2	–0.712
Teams marked * progressed to the next stage of the competition. Team marked † were eliminated from the competition.

=== Match log ===
Date	Opponent	Venue	Result	Scorecard Link
24 September	Mumbai Indians	Chennai	Lost by 3 wickets	Scorecard
28 September	Cape Cobras	Chennai	Won by 4 wickets, MoM – Dwayne Bravo 46* (25) and 2/23	Scorecard
2 October	Trinidad and Tobago	Chennai	Lost by 12 runs	Scorecard
4 October	New South Wales	Chennai	Lost by 46 runs	Scorecard
Overall Record of 1 – 3 Failed to make Semi-Finals

=== Most runs ===
Player	Innings	Runs	Average	Strike rate	Highest Score	100s	50s
Michael Hussey	4	160	40.00	133.33	81	0	1
Dwayne Bravo	3	94	94.00	162.06	46*	0	0
Suresh Raina	4	68	17.00	109.67	28	0	0

=== Most wickets ===
Player	Innings	Wickets	Average	Economy rate	Best Bowling	4w
Ravichandran Ashwin	4	5	21.20	5.75	2/23	0
Dwayne Bravo	4	5	22.60	7.53	2/22	0
Doug Bollinger	4	5	28.00	9.43	3/30	0
