= 2011 Deccan Chargers season =

Indian Premier League cricket team season

Deccan Chargers
2011 season
- Coach: Darren Lehmann
- Captain: Kumar Sangakkara; Cameron White (Note: Cameron White acted as the captain in the last match as Sangakkara left the squad on the national duty for the Sri Lanka tour of England.)
- Ground(s): Rajiv Gandhi International Cricket Stadium, Hyderabad (Capacity: 55,000)
- IPL: Group Stage (7th)
- Most runs: Shikhar Dhawan (400)
- Most wickets: Amit Mishra (19)
- Most catches: Daniel Christian (7)
- Most wicket-keeping dismissals: Kumar Sangakkara (19)

The Deccan Chargers (DC) were a franchise cricket team based in Hyderabad, India, that competed in the Indian Premier League (IPL), a professional Twenty20 cricket (T20) league in India. They were one of the ten teams that competed in the 2011 Indian Premier League, making their fourth appearance in all IPL tournaments. The team was captained by Kumar Sangakkara and coached by Darren Lehmann.

The Deccan Chargers started their campaign by losing their opening fixture of the IPL on 9 April against the Rajasthan Royals and failed to qualify for playoffs finishing seventh in the group stage.

== Player acquisition ==
The Deccan Chargers retained none of the players from the previous season. They have bought 27 players including 14 players from the auction and still had $1.47million left in their purse in the end out of their allotted $9 million.

Players retained: None

Players released: Harmeet Singh Bansal, Azhar Bilakhia, Sumanth Bodapati, Ravi Teja Dwaraka, Herschelle Gibbs, Adam Gilchrist, Ryan Harris, Mitchell Marsh, Mohnish Mishra, Pragyan Ojha, Ashish Reddy, Kemar Roach, Rahul Sharma, Rohit Sharma, Anirudh Singh, Jaskaran Singh, R. P. Singh, Dwayne Smith, Andrew Symonds, Suman Tirumalasetti, V. V. S. Laxman, Chaminda Vaas, Arjun Yadav, Venugopal Rao Yalaka

Players acquired during the auction: Daniel Christian, Shikhar Dhawan, JP Duminy, Manpreet Gony, Michael Lumb, Chris Lynn, Amit Mishra, Pragyan Ojha, Kevin Pietersen, Kumar Sangakkara, Ishant Sharma, Dale Steyn, Rusty Theron, Cameron White

Uncapped players acquired: Harmeet Singh Bansal, Akash Bhandari, Bharat Chipli, Kedar Devdhar, Ravi Teja Dwaraka, Ishank Jaggi, Ishan Malhotra, Anand Rajan, Ashish Reddy, Jaydev Shah, Ankit Sharma, Sunny Sohal, Arjun Yadav

== Squad ==
- Players with international caps are listed in **bold**.
- **Year signed** denotes the season the player first signed for the team

Name	Nationality	Birth date	Batting style	Bowling style	Year signed	Notes
Batsmen
Bharat Chipli	India	27 January 1983 (aged 28)	Right-handed	Right-arm medium fast	2011	
**Shikhar Dhawan**	India	5 December 1985 (aged 25)	Left-handed	Right-arm off break	2011	
Ravi Teja Dwaraka	India	5 September 1988 (aged 22)	Right-handed	Right-arm leg break	2008	
Ishank Jaggi	India	27 October 1989 (aged 21)	Right-handed	Right-arm leg break	2011	
**Michael Lumb**	England	12 February 1980 (aged 31)	Left-handed	Right-arm medium fast	2011	Overseas.
Chris Lynn	Australia	10 April 1990 (aged 20)	Right-handed	Slow left-arm orthodox	2011	Overseas.
**Kevin Pietersen**	England	27 June 1980 (aged 30)	Right-handed	Right-arm off break	2011	Overseas. Ruled out of season due to surgery.
Jaydev Shah	India	4 May 1983 (aged 27)	Left-handed	Right-arm off break	2011	
Sunny Sohal	India	10 November 1987 (aged 23)	Right-handed	Right-arm leg break	2011	
**Cameron White**	Australia	18 August 1983 (aged 27)	Right-handed	Right-arm leg break	2011	Overseas and Vice-captain.
Arjun Yadav	India	23 December 1981 (aged 29)	Right-handed	Right-arm off break	2008	
All-rounders
**Daniel Christian**	Australia	4 May 1983 (aged 27)	Right-handed	Right-arm medium fast	2011	Overseas.
**JP Duminy**	South Africa	14 April 1984 (aged 26)	Left-handed	Right-arm off break	2011	Overseas.
Ashish Reddy	India	24 February 1991 (aged 20)	Right-handed	Right-arm medium fast	2010	
Wicket-keepers
Kedar Devdhar	India	14 December 1989 (aged 21)	Right-handed		2011	
**Kumar Sangakkara**	Sri Lanka	27 October 1977 (aged 33)	Left-handed	Right-arm off break	2011	Overseas and Captain.
Bowlers
Harmeet Singh Bansal	India	9 October 1987 (aged 23)	Right-handed	Right-arm medium fast	2009	
Akash Bhandari	India	10 June 1993 (aged 17)	Right-handed	Right-arm leg break	2011	
**Manpreet Gony**	India	4 January 1984 (aged 27)	Right-handed	Right-arm medium fast	2011	
Ishan Malhotra	India	23 May 1984 (aged 26)	Right-handed	Right-arm medium fast	2011	
**Amit Mishra**	India	24 November 1982 (aged 28)	Right-handed	Right-arm leg break	2011	
**Pragyan Ojha**	India	5 September 1986 (aged 24)	Left-handed	Slow left-arm orthodox	2008	
Anand Rajan	India	17 April 1987 (aged 23)	Right-handed	Right-arm medium fast	2011	
Ankit Sharma	India	20 April 1991 (aged 19)	Left-handed	Slow left-arm orthodox	2011	
**Ishant Sharma**	India	2 September 1988 (aged 22)	Right-handed	Right-arm medium fast	2011	
**Dale Steyn**	South Africa	27 June 1983 (aged 27)	Right-handed	Right-arm fast	2011	Overseas.
**Rusty Theron**	South Africa	24 June 1985 (aged 25)	Right-handed	Right-arm medium fast	2011	Overseas.

== Kit manufacturers and sponsors ==
Kit Manufacturers	Shirt Sponsor (Chest)	Shirt Sponsor (Back)	Chest Branding
Puma	UltraTech Cement	Deccan Chronicle	McDowell's No.1
Source :

T20 uniform

== Season overview ==
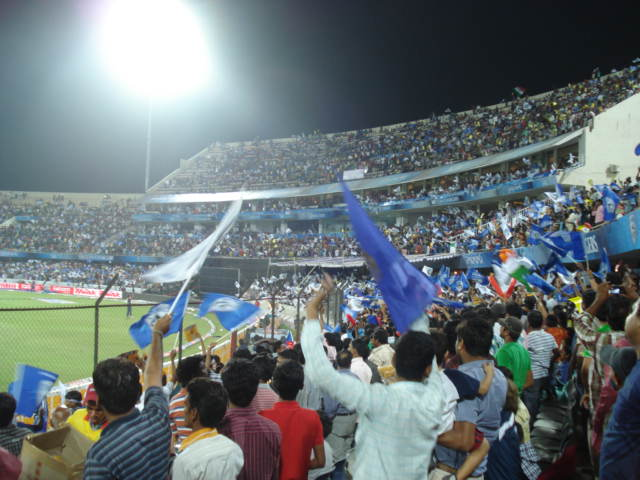
Home fans at Hyderabad cheering for the Deccan Chargers during the match against the Delhi Daredevils

=== Standings ===
Pos	Grp	Team	Pld	W	L	NR	Pts	NRR
1	B	Royal Challengers Bangalore (R)	14	9	4	1	19	0.326
2	B	Chennai Super Kings (C)	14	9	5	0	18	0.443
3	A	Mumbai Indians (3)	14	9	5	0	18	0.040
4	B	Kolkata Knight Riders (4)	14	8	6	0	16	0.433
5	A	Kings XI Punjab	14	7	7	0	14	−0.051
6	B	Rajasthan Royals	14	6	7	1	13	−0.691
7	A	Deccan Chargers	14	6	8	0	12	0.222
8	B	Kochi Tuskers Kerala	14	6	8	0	12	−0.214
9	A	Pune Warriors India	14	4	9	1	9	−0.134
10	A	Delhi Daredevils	14	4	9	1	9	−0.448

Source: ESPNcricinfo

Note: Top four teams qualified for the playoffs.
The top three teams also qualified for the Champions League Twenty20 while the fourth team played in the qualifying stage.

=== Results by match ===
Round	1	2	3	4	5	6	7	8	9	10	11	12	13	14
Ground	H	A	H	H	A	H	A	A	H	H	H	A	A	A
Result	L	L	W	L	W	L	W	L	L	L	L	W	W	W

Source: Fixtures
A = Away; H = Home; W = Win; D = Draw; L = Loss

== Fixtures ==
All times are in Indian Standard Time (UTC+05:30)

=== Group stage ===
9 April	(H) Deccan Chargers; 137/8 (20 overs)	v	Rajasthan Royals; 141/2 (18.5 overs)	Rajasthan Royals won by 8 wickets
16:00 Round 1 Scorecard	(H) Deccan Chargers; 137/8 (20 overs)	v	Rajasthan Royals; 141/2 (18.5 overs)	Rajiv Gandhi International Cricket Stadium, Hyderabad; Umpires: Rudi Koertzen (SA) and Shavir Tarapore (Ind); Player of the match: Siddharth Trivedi (Rajasthan Royals)
16:00 Round 1 Scorecard	Dwaraka Ravi Teja 28 (20); Siddharth Trivedi 3/15 (4 overs)		Johan Botha 67* (47); Dale Steyn 2/18 (4 overs)	Rajiv Gandhi International Cricket Stadium, Hyderabad; Umpires: Rudi Koertzen (SA) and Shavir Tarapore (Ind); Player of the match: Siddharth Trivedi (Rajasthan Royals)
Rajasthan Royals won the toss and elected to field.				Rajiv Gandhi International Cricket Stadium, Hyderabad; Umpires: Rudi Koertzen (SA) and Shavir Tarapore (Ind); Player of the match: Siddharth Trivedi (Rajasthan Royals)

11 April	(H) Kolkata Knight Riders; 163/4 (20 overs)	v	Deccan Chargers; 154/8 (20 overs)	Kolkata Knight Riders won by 9 runs
20:00 (D/N) Round 2 Scorecard	(H) Kolkata Knight Riders; 163/4 (20 overs)	v	Deccan Chargers; 154/8 (20 overs)	Eden Gardens, Kolkata; Umpires: Rudi Koertzen (SA) and Shavir Tarapore (Ind); Player of the match: Jacques Kallis (Kolkata Knight Riders)
20:00 (D/N) Round 2 Scorecard	Jacques Kallis 53 (45); Amit Mishra 2/19 (4 overs)		Bharat Chipli 48 (40); Iqbal Abdullah 3/24 (4 overs)	Eden Gardens, Kolkata; Umpires: Rudi Koertzen (SA) and Shavir Tarapore (Ind); Player of the match: Jacques Kallis (Kolkata Knight Riders)
Kolkata Knight Riders won the toss and elected to bat.				Eden Gardens, Kolkata; Umpires: Rudi Koertzen (SA) and Shavir Tarapore (Ind); Player of the match: Jacques Kallis (Kolkata Knight Riders)

14 April	(H) Deccan Chargers; 175/5 (20 overs)	v	Royal Challengers Bangalore; 142/9 (20 overs)	Deccan Chargers won by 33 runs
20:00 (D/N) Round 3 Scorecard	(H) Deccan Chargers; 175/5 (20 overs)	v	Royal Challengers Bangalore; 142/9 (20 overs)	Rajiv Gandhi International Cricket Stadium, Hyderabad; Umpires: Rudi Koertzen (SA) and S. Ravi (Ind); Player of the match: Dale Steyn (Deccan Chargers)
20:00 (D/N) Round 3 Scorecard	Bharat Chipli 61* (35); Zaheer Khan 3/32 (4 overs)		Virat Kohli 71 (51); Dale Steyn 3/24 (4 overs)	Rajiv Gandhi International Cricket Stadium, Hyderabad; Umpires: Rudi Koertzen (SA) and S. Ravi (Ind); Player of the match: Dale Steyn (Deccan Chargers)
Royal Challengers Bangalore won the toss and elected to field.				Rajiv Gandhi International Cricket Stadium, Hyderabad; Umpires: Rudi Koertzen (SA) and S. Ravi (Ind); Player of the match: Dale Steyn (Deccan Chargers)

16 April	(H) Deccan Chargers; 165/8 (20 overs)	v	Kings XI Punjab; 166/2 (17.4 overs)	Kings XI Punjab won by 8 wickets
20:00 (D/N) Round 4 Scorecard	(H) Deccan Chargers; 165/8 (20 overs)	v	Kings XI Punjab; 166/2 (17.4 overs)	Rajiv Gandhi International Cricket Stadium, Hyderabad; Umpires: Rudi Koertzen (SA) and S. Ravi (Ind); Player of the match: Paul Valthaty (Kings XI Punjab)
20:00 (D/N) Round 4 Scorecard	Shikhar Dhawan 45 (36); Paul Valthaty 4/29 (4 overs)		Paul Valthaty 75 (47); Amit Mishra 2/28 (4 overs)	Rajiv Gandhi International Cricket Stadium, Hyderabad; Umpires: Rudi Koertzen (SA) and S. Ravi (Ind); Player of the match: Paul Valthaty (Kings XI Punjab)
Kings XI Punjab won the toss and elected to field.				Rajiv Gandhi International Cricket Stadium, Hyderabad; Umpires: Rudi Koertzen (SA) and S. Ravi (Ind); Player of the match: Paul Valthaty (Kings XI Punjab)

19 April	Deccan Chargers; 168/4 (20 overs)	v	Delhi Daredevils (H); 152/7 (20 overs)	Deccan Chargers won by 16 runs
16:00 Round 5 Scorecard	Deccan Chargers; 168/4 (20 overs)	v	Delhi Daredevils (H); 152/7 (20 overs)	Feroz Shah Kotla, Delhi; Umpires: Paul Reiffel and Rod Tucker (both Aus); Player of the match: Sunny Sohal (Deccan Chargers)
16:00 Round 5 Scorecard	Sunny Sohal 62 (41); Shahbaz Nadeem 1/24 (3 overs)		David Warner 51 (48); Harmeet Singh 2/27 (4 overs)	Feroz Shah Kotla, Delhi; Umpires: Paul Reiffel and Rod Tucker (both Aus); Player of the match: Sunny Sohal (Deccan Chargers)
Deccan Chargers won the toss and elected to bat.				Feroz Shah Kotla, Delhi; Umpires: Paul Reiffel and Rod Tucker (both Aus); Player of the match: Sunny Sohal (Deccan Chargers)

24 April	Mumbai Indians; 172/4 (20 overs)	v	Deccan Chargers (H); 135/8 (20 overs)	Mumbai Indians won by 37 runs
16:00 Round 6 Scorecard	Mumbai Indians; 172/4 (20 overs)	v	Deccan Chargers (H); 135/8 (20 overs)	Rajiv Gandhi International Cricket Stadium, Hyderabad; Umpires: Kumar Dharmasena (SL) and Tony Hill (NZ); Player of the match: Lasith Malinga (Mumbai Indians)
16:00 Round 6 Scorecard	Rohit Sharma 56* (34); Amit Mishra 2/14 (4 overs)		Kumar Sangakkara 34 (28); Lasith Malinga 3/9 (4 overs)	Rajiv Gandhi International Cricket Stadium, Hyderabad; Umpires: Kumar Dharmasena (SL) and Tony Hill (NZ); Player of the match: Lasith Malinga (Mumbai Indians)
Deccan Chargers won the toss and elected to field.				Rajiv Gandhi International Cricket Stadium, Hyderabad; Umpires: Kumar Dharmasena (SL) and Tony Hill (NZ); Player of the match: Lasith Malinga (Mumbai Indians)

27 April	Deccan Chargers; 129/6 (20 overs)	v	Kochi Tuskers Kerala (H); 74 (16.3 overs)	Deccan Chargers won by 55 runs
20:00 (D/N) Round 7 Scorecard	Deccan Chargers; 129/6 (20 overs)	v	Kochi Tuskers Kerala (H); 74 (16.3 overs)	Jawaharlal Nehru Stadium, Kochi; Umpires: Kumar Dharmasena (SL) and Tony Hill (NZ); Player of the match: Ishant Sharma (Deccan Chargers)
20:00 (D/N) Round 7 Scorecard	Kumar Sangakkara 65 (47); Vinay Kumar 3/25 (4 overs)		Ravindra Jadeja 23 (35); Ishant Sharma 5/12 (3 overs)	Jawaharlal Nehru Stadium, Kochi; Umpires: Kumar Dharmasena (SL) and Tony Hill (NZ); Player of the match: Ishant Sharma (Deccan Chargers)
Kochi Tuskers Kerala won the toss and elected to field.				Jawaharlal Nehru Stadium, Kochi; Umpires: Kumar Dharmasena (SL) and Tony Hill (NZ); Player of the match: Ishant Sharma (Deccan Chargers)

1 May	(H) Chennai Super Kings; 165/5 (20 overs)	v	Deccan Chargers; 146/8 (20 overs)	Chennai Super Kings won by 19 runs
20:00 (D/N) Round 8 Scorecard	(H) Chennai Super Kings; 165/5 (20 overs)	v	Deccan Chargers; 146/8 (20 overs)	M. A. Chidambaram Stadium, Chennai; Umpires: Aleem Dar (Pak) and Russell Tiffin (Zim); Player of the match: Albie Morkel (Chennai Super Kings)
20:00 (D/N) Round 8 Scorecard	Suresh Raina 59 (35); Pragyan Ojha 3/26 (4 overs)		Sunny Sohal 56 (30); Albie Morkel 3/38 (4 overs)	M. A. Chidambaram Stadium, Chennai; Umpires: Aleem Dar (Pak) and Russell Tiffin (Zim); Player of the match: Albie Morkel (Chennai Super Kings)
Chennai Super Kings won the toss and elected to bat.				M. A. Chidambaram Stadium, Chennai; Umpires: Aleem Dar (Pak) and Russell Tiffin (Zim); Player of the match: Albie Morkel (Chennai Super Kings)

3 May	Kolkata Knight Riders; 169/4 (20 overs)	v	Deccan Chargers (H); 149/6 (20 overs)	Kolkata Knight Riders won by 20 runs
20:00 (D/N) Round 9 Scorecard	Kolkata Knight Riders; 169/4 (20 overs)	v	Deccan Chargers (H); 149/6 (20 overs)	Rajiv Gandhi International Cricket Stadium, Hyderabad; Umpires: Sudhir Asnani (Ind) and Rod Tucker (Aus); Player of the match: Yusuf Pathan (Kolkata Knight Riders)
20:00 (D/N) Round 9 Scorecard	Yusuf Pathan 47* (26); Amit Mishra 1/22 (3 overs)		Shikhar Dhawan 54 (45); Rajat Bhatia 2/26 (4 overs)	Rajiv Gandhi International Cricket Stadium, Hyderabad; Umpires: Sudhir Asnani (Ind) and Rod Tucker (Aus); Player of the match: Yusuf Pathan (Kolkata Knight Riders)
Deccan Chargers won the toss and elected to field.				Rajiv Gandhi International Cricket Stadium, Hyderabad; Umpires: Sudhir Asnani (Ind) and Rod Tucker (Aus); Player of the match: Yusuf Pathan (Kolkata Knight Riders)

5 May	(H) Deccan Chargers; 175/5 (20 overs)	v	Delhi Daredevils; 179/6 (19 overs)	Delhi Daredevils won by 4 wickets
20:00 (D/N) Round 10 Scorecard	(H) Deccan Chargers; 175/5 (20 overs)	v	Delhi Daredevils; 179/6 (19 overs)	Rajiv Gandhi International Cricket Stadium, Hyderabad; Umpires: Asad Rauf (Pak) and Amiesh Saheba (Ind); Player of the match: Virender Sehwag (Delhi Daredevils)
20:00 (D/N) Round 10 Scorecard	JP Duminy 55 (31); Ajit Agarkar 2/29 (4 overs)		Virender Sehwag 119 (56); Ishant Sharma 2/16 (4 overs)	Rajiv Gandhi International Cricket Stadium, Hyderabad; Umpires: Asad Rauf (Pak) and Amiesh Saheba (Ind); Player of the match: Virender Sehwag (Delhi Daredevils)
Delhi Daredevils won the toss and elected to field.				Rajiv Gandhi International Cricket Stadium, Hyderabad; Umpires: Asad Rauf (Pak) and Amiesh Saheba (Ind); Player of the match: Virender Sehwag (Delhi Daredevils)

10 May	(H) Deccan Chargers; 136/8 (20 overs)	v	Pune Warriors India; 137/4 (18.2 overs)	Pune Warriors India won by 6 wickets
16:00 Round 11 Scorecard	(H) Deccan Chargers; 136/8 (20 overs)	v	Pune Warriors India; 137/4 (18.2 overs)	Rajiv Gandhi International Cricket Stadium, Hyderabad; Umpires: Asad Rauf (Pak) and Amiesh Saheba (Ind); Player of the match: Mitchell Marsh (Pune Warriors India)
16:00 Round 11 Scorecard	Dwaraka Ravi Teja 30 (27); Mitchell Marsh 4/25 (4 overs)		Manish Pandey 49 (42); Daniel Christian 2/21 (3 overs)	Rajiv Gandhi International Cricket Stadium, Hyderabad; Umpires: Asad Rauf (Pak) and Amiesh Saheba (Ind); Player of the match: Mitchell Marsh (Pune Warriors India)
Deccan Chargers won the toss and elected to bat.				Rajiv Gandhi International Cricket Stadium, Hyderabad; Umpires: Asad Rauf (Pak) and Amiesh Saheba (Ind); Player of the match: Mitchell Marsh (Pune Warriors India)

14 May	Deccan Chargers; 135/6 (20 overs)	v	Mumbai Indians (H); 125/8 (20 overs)	Deccan Chargers won by 10 runs
20:00 (D/N) Round 12 Scorecard	Deccan Chargers; 135/6 (20 overs)	v	Mumbai Indians (H); 125/8 (20 overs)	Wankhede Stadium, Mumbai; Umpires: Shavir Tarapore (Ind) and S. Ravi (Ind); Player of the match: Amit Mishra (Deccan Chargers)
20:00 (D/N) Round 12 Scorecard	Shikhar Dhawan 27* (18); Dhawal Kulkarni 3/26 (4 overs)		Sachin Tendulkar 37 (42); Anand Rajan 3/27 (3 overs)	Wankhede Stadium, Mumbai; Umpires: Shavir Tarapore (Ind) and S. Ravi (Ind); Player of the match: Amit Mishra (Deccan Chargers)
Deccan Chargers won the toss and elected to bat.				Wankhede Stadium, Mumbai; Umpires: Shavir Tarapore (Ind) and S. Ravi (Ind); Player of the match: Amit Mishra (Deccan Chargers)

16 May	(H) Pune Warriors India; 136/9 (20 overs)	v	Deccan Chargers; 138/4 (19.2 overs)	Deccan Chargers won by 6 wickets
20:00 (D/N) Round 13 Scorecard	(H) Pune Warriors India; 136/9 (20 overs)	v	Deccan Chargers; 138/4 (19.2 overs)	DY Patil Stadium, Navi Mumbai; Umpires: Shavir Tarapore (Ind) and S. Ravi (both Ind); Player of the match: Amit Mishra (Deccan Chargers)
20:00 (D/N) Round 13 Scorecard	Mitchell Marsh 37 (28); Daniel Christian 2/13 (3 overs)		Sunny Sohal 34 (28); Rahul Sharma 2/25 (4 overs)	DY Patil Stadium, Navi Mumbai; Umpires: Shavir Tarapore (Ind) and S. Ravi (both Ind); Player of the match: Amit Mishra (Deccan Chargers)
Deccan Chargers won the toss and elected to field.				DY Patil Stadium, Navi Mumbai; Umpires: Shavir Tarapore (Ind) and S. Ravi (both Ind); Player of the match: Amit Mishra (Deccan Chargers)

21 May	Deccan Chargers; 198/2 (20 overs)	v	Kings XI Punjab (H); 116 (19 overs)	Deccan Chargers won by 82 runs
16:00 Round 14 Scorecard	Deccan Chargers; 198/2 (20 overs)	v	Kings XI Punjab (H); 116 (19 overs)	HPCA Stadium, Dharamsala; Umpires: Asad Rauf (Pak) and Amiesh Saheba (Ind); Player of the match: Shikhar Dhawan (Deccan Chargers)
16:00 Round 14 Scorecard	Shikhar Dhawan 95* (57); Paul Valthaty 1/24 (4 overs)		Adam Gilchrist 51 (37); Amit Mishra 4/9 (4 overs)	HPCA Stadium, Dharamsala; Umpires: Asad Rauf (Pak) and Amiesh Saheba (Ind); Player of the match: Shikhar Dhawan (Deccan Chargers)
Kings XI Punjab won the toss and elected to field.				HPCA Stadium, Dharamsala; Umpires: Asad Rauf (Pak) and Amiesh Saheba (Ind); Player of the match: Shikhar Dhawan (Deccan Chargers)

== Statistics ==
Name	Mat	Runs	HS	Ave	SR	Wkts	BBI	Ave	Eco	Ct	St
Shikhar Dhawan	14	400	95*	33.33	129.03	1	1/7	11.00	5.50	6	–
Kumar Sangakkara	13	358	65	27.53	122.18	–	–	–	–	17	2
Ravi Teja Dwaraka	12	183	60	26.14	127.08	0	–	–	9.00	5	–
Cameron White	6	104	31*	26.00	95.41	–	–	–	–	2	–
Bharat Chipli	14	207	61*	25.87	121.76	0	–	–	20.00	1	–
Sunny Sohal	11	249	62	24.90	130.36	–	–	–	–	0	–
JP Duminy	10	205	55	20.50	117.81	4	1/3	35.75	7.94	2	–
Daniel Christian	14	190	30	17.27	119.49	11	2/13	31.81	7.66	7	–
Amit Mishra	14	68	25*	17.00	138.77	19	4/9	18.84	6.71	2	–
Ishank Jaggi	2	28	25	14.00	75.67	–	–	–	–	1	–
Dale Steyn	12	36	13	9.00	102.85	14	3/16	18.84	6.71	2	–
Manpreet Gony	3	0	0*	0.00	0.00	4	3/31	21.25	9.44	0	–
Michael Lumb	1	0	0	0.00	0.00	–	–	–	–	1	–
Ishan Malhotra	1	7	7*	–	175.00	0	–	–	23.00	0	–
Ishant Sharma	12	4	1*	–	80.00	11	5/12	28.54	7.13	3	–
Anand Rajan	2	–	–	–	–	3	3/27	16.66	10.00	2	–
Kedar Devdhar	1	–	–	–	–	–	–	–	–	0	1
Harmeet Singh Bansal	2	–	–	–	–	3	2/27	17.66	7.57	0	–
Pragyan Ojha	10	–	–	–	–	10	3/26	26.70	7.24	2	–

Source: 2011 IPL Statistics Full Table on ESPNcricinfo

== Awards and achievements ==
=== Awards ===
Man of the Match

No.	Date	Player	Opponent	Venue	Result	Contribution	Ref.
1	14 April 2011	Dale Steyn	Royal Challengers Bangalore	Hyderabad	Won by 33 runs	3/24 (4 overs)	
2	19 April 2011	Sunny Sohal	Delhi Daredevils	Delhi	Won by 16 runs	62 (41)	
3	27 April 2011	Ishant Sharma	Kochi Tuskers Kerala	Kochi	Won by 55 runs	5/12 (3 overs)	
4	14 May 2011	Amit Mishra	Mumbai Indians	Mumbai	Won by 10 runs	18* (6) & 1/18 (4 overs)	
5	16 May 2011	Amit Mishra	Pune Warriors India	Navi Mumbai	Won by 6 wickets	2/26 (4 overs)	
6	21 May 2011	Shikhar Dhawan	Kings XI Punjab	Dharmasala	Won By 82 runs	95* (57)	

=== Achievements ===
- Ishant Sharma took the first-ever fifer for the Deccan Chargers in the match against Kochi Tuskers Kerala. This is also the best bowling figures of the 2011 Indian Premier League (2011 IPL).
- Amit Mishra took the hat-trick for the Deccan Chargers in the match against Kings XI Punjab. This is also the only hat-trick recorded in the 2011 IPL.
