= 2011 Kings XI Punjab season =

Indian Premier League cricket team season

Kings XI Punjab
2011 season
- Coach: Michael Bevan
- Captain: Adam Gilchrist
- Ground(s): PCA Stadium, Mohali
- IPL: 5th
- Most runs: Shaun Marsh (504)
- Most wickets: Piyush Chawla (16)

Kings XI Punjab (KXIP) is a franchise cricket team based in Mohali, India, which plays in the Indian Premier League (IPL). They were one of the ten teams that competed in the 2011 Indian Premier League. They were captained by Adam Gilchrist. Kings XI Punjab finished 5th in the IPL and did not qualify for the Champions League T20.

== Indian Premier League ==
=== Season standings ===
Kings XI Punjab finished 5th in the league stage of IPL 2011.

Pos	Grp	Team	Pld	W	L	NR	Pts	NRR
1	B	Royal Challengers Bangalore (R)	14	9	4	1	19	0.326
2	B	Chennai Super Kings (C)	14	9	5	0	18	0.443
3	A	Mumbai Indians (3)	14	9	5	0	18	0.040
4	B	Kolkata Knight Riders (4)	14	8	6	0	16	0.433
5	A	Kings XI Punjab	14	7	7	0	14	−0.051
6	B	Rajasthan Royals	14	6	7	1	13	−0.691
7	A	Deccan Chargers	14	6	8	0	12	0.222
8	B	Kochi Tuskers Kerala	14	6	8	0	12	−0.214
9	A	Pune Warriors India	14	4	9	1	9	−0.134
10	A	Delhi Daredevils	14	4	9	1	9	−0.448

Source: ESPNcricinfo

Note: Top four teams qualified for the playoffs.
The top three teams also qualified for the Champions League Twenty20 while the fourth team played in the qualifying stage.

=== Match log ===
No.	Date	Opponent	Venue	Result
1	10 April	Pune Warriors India	Mumbai	Lost by 7 wickets
2	13 April	Chennai Super Kings	Mohali	Won by 6 wickets MoM – Paul Valthaty – 120* (63)
3	16 April	Deccan Chargers	Hyderabad	Won by 8 wickets MoM – Paul Valthaty – 75 (47) and 4/29 (4 overs)
4	21 April	Rajasthan Royals	Mohali	Won by 48 runs MoM – Shaun Marsh – 71 (42)
5	23 April	Delhi Daredevils	Delhi	Lost by 29 runs
6	30 April	Kolkata Knight Riders	Kolkata	Lost by 8 wickets
7	2 May	Mumbai Indians	Mumbai	Lost by 23 runs
8	6 May	Royal Challengers Bangalore	Bangalore	Lost by 85 runs
9	8 May	Pune Warriors India	Mohali	Lost by 5 wickets
10	10 May	Mumbai Indians	Mohali	Won by 79 runs MoM – Bhargav Bhatt - 4/22 (2.5 overs)
11	13 May	Kochi Tuskers Kerala	Indore	Won by 6 wickets MoM – Dinesh Karthik – 69 (33)
12	15 May	Delhi Daredevils	Dharamsala	Won by 29 runs MoM – Piyush Chawla - 3/16 (4 overs)
13	17 May	Royal Challengers Bangalore	Dharamsala	Won by 111 runs MoM - Adam Gilchrist – 106 (55)
14	21 May	Deccan Chargers	Dharamsala	Lost by 82 runs
Overall record: 7–7. Failed to advance.
