= 2011 Kolkata Knight Riders season =

Indian Premier League cricket team season

Kolkata Knight Riders
2011 season
- Coach: Dav Whatmore
- Captain: Gautam Gambhir
- Ground(s): Eden Gardens, Kolkata
- IPL: 4th
- CLT20: Group stage
- Most runs: Jacques Kallis (424)
- Most wickets: Yusuf Pathan (13)

Kolkata Knight Riders (KKR) is a franchise cricket team based in Kolkata, India, which plays in the Indian Premier League (IPL). They were one of the ten teams that competed in the 2011 IPL. They were captained by Gautam Gambhir. Kolkata Knight Riders finished 4th in the IPL and qualified for the Champions League T20 for the first time.

== Background ==
In this edition of the IPL, the Kolkata Knight Riders decided to revamp the team, starting with a new look and by changing the entire set of players. Gautam Gambhir, who was bought for a record-breaking $2.4 million was appointed as skipper. KKR also managed to buy Yusuf Pathan for $2.1 million. Other international names added to the squad included allrounders Shakib Al Hasan and Jacques Kallis, pace bowler Brett Lee and Ryan ten Doeschate. Brad Haddin was replaced by Mark Boucher in mid-season due to a finger injury he sustained during practice.

The Kolkata Knight Riders had a disappointing start of season, losing to Chennai Super Kings by 2 runs. But they came back stronger, winning their next three matches against Deccan Chargers and Rajasthan Royals at Kolkata and Jaipur respectively. After two consecutive defeats in their home ground, the team had a string of wins against Delhi Daredevils, Kings XI Punjab and Deccan Chargers. They went on to win two of the remaining four matches; one against Chennai Super Kings in Kolkata and the other against Pune Warriors India in Navi Mumbai which enabled them to qualify for the playoffs for the first time. In the eliminator they lost to Mumbai Indians owing to a last over by Lakshmipathy Balaji which conceded 21 runs, losing their chance to enter the finals for the first time.

In the 2011 auctions, Sourav Ganguly was not picked by KKR, nor by any other team in the league. This created a huge uproar in Kolkata. The angry fans created a protest group called No Dada No KKR. This was followed by a silent protest rally, signature campaigns throughout the country and abroad and stadium protests. But the uproar came to a halt and the fans' reactions gradually bettered as the team's performance improved and the Eden Gardens began to witness huge capacities. KKR finished the top amongst all teams after the completion of the mid season game-play.

=== Champions League Twenty20 ===
KKR's top four finish meant they would now participate in the qualifying stage for the 2011 Champions League Twenty20, held from 19 to 21 September. Captain Gautam Gambhir wasn't able to lead the team during the qualifying stage, as he has been recovering from an injury he sustained during a Test match between India and England at The Oval. Jacques Kallis was the appointed captain in Gambhir's absence. However, Gambhir returned to lead the team in the Group stage. KKR was also without the services of Eoin Morgan, who was due to have a shoulder surgery, and Mark Boucher who was playing for Warriors.

They were drawn along with Somerset and Auckland Aces in Pool B of qualification stage. Both of their matches were initially to be played at the Eden Gardens in Kolkata, but was later moved to the Rajiv Gandhi International Cricket Stadium in Hyderabad. They recorded a 2-run victory in their first match against Auckland Aces, thanks to brilliant spells from Iqbal Abdulla and Yusuf Pathan. Their next match against Somerset Sabres ended in an 11-run defeat. However, both teams qualified for the main tournament by finishing on a better NRR+ than Sri Lankan franchise Ruhuna Rhinos of Pool A.

The team was placed with Somerset, Southern Redbacks, Warriors and fellow IPL team Royal Challengers Bangalore in Group B of the tournament. They lost their first two matches against Somerset Sabres and Southern Redbacks. They made an impressive comeback by winning the last two games, first by 9 wickets against Royal Challengers Bangalore and a rain affected 22 run victory by (D/L) against Warriors. However, despite being tied on points, they could not make the semi-final due to a lesser NRR+ than the Royal Challengers. They ended up fifth on the overall points table.

== Indian Premier League ==
=== Season standings ===
Kolkata Knight Riders finished 4th in the league stage of IPL 2011.

Pos	Grp	Team	Pld	W	L	NR	Pts	NRR
1	B	Royal Challengers Bangalore (R)	14	9	4	1	19	0.326
2	B	Chennai Super Kings (C)	14	9	5	0	18	0.443
3	A	Mumbai Indians (3)	14	9	5	0	18	0.040
4	B	Kolkata Knight Riders (4)	14	8	6	0	16	0.433
5	A	Kings XI Punjab	14	7	7	0	14	−0.051
6	B	Rajasthan Royals	14	6	7	1	13	−0.691
7	A	Deccan Chargers	14	6	8	0	12	0.222
8	B	Kochi Tuskers Kerala	14	6	8	0	12	−0.214
9	A	Pune Warriors India	14	4	9	1	9	−0.134
10	A	Delhi Daredevils	14	4	9	1	9	−0.448

Source: ESPNcricinfo

Note: Top four teams qualified for the playoffs.
The top three teams also qualified for the Champions League Twenty20 while the fourth team played in the qualifying stage.

=== Match log ===
Date	Opponent	Venue	Result
8 April	Chennai Super Kings	Chennai	Lost by 2 runs
11 April	Deccan Chargers	Kolkata	Won by 9 runs, MoM- Jacques Kallis 54 (42)
15 April	Rajasthan Royals	Jaipur	Won by 9 wickets, MoM- Gautam Gambhir 75* (44)
17 April	Rajasthan Royals	Kolkata	Won by 8 wickets, MoM- Lakshmipathy Balaji 3/15 (3 overs)
20 April	Kochi Tuskers Kerala	Kolkata	Lost by 6 runs
22 April	Royal Challengers Bangalore	Kolkata	Lost by 9 wickets
28 April	Delhi Daredevils	Delhi	Won by 17 runs, MoM- Manoj Tiwary 61* (47)
30 April	Kings XI Punjab	Kolkata	Won by 8 wickets, MoM- Iqbal Abdulla 2/19 (4 overs)
3 May	Deccan Chargers	Hyderabad	Won by 20 runs, MoM- Yusuf Pathan 47* (26)
5 May	Kochi Tuskers Kerala	Kochi	Lost by 17 runs
7 May	Chennai Super Kings	Kolkata	Won by 10 runs (D/L), MoM- Iqbal Abdulla 1/15 (4 overs)
14 May	Royal Challengers Bangalore	Bengaluru	Lost by 4 wickets (D/L)
19 May	Pune Warriors India	Navi Mumbai	Won by 7 wickets, MoM- Yusuf Pathan 29 (25) and 2/23 (4 overs)
22 May	Mumbai Indians	Kolkata	Lost by 5 wickets
25 May (#Eliminator)	Mumbai Indians	Mumbai	Lost by 4 wickets
Overall record: 8–7. Qualified for playoffs.

== Champions League Twenty20 ==
=== Match log ===
No.	Date	Opponent	Venue	Result	Scorecard
1	19 September (Qualifier #1)	Auckland Aces	Hyderabad	Won by 2 runs, MoM- Manvinder Bisla 45 (32)	Scorecard
2	21 September (Qualifier #2)	Somerset Sabres	Hyderabad	Lost by 11 runs	Scorecard
3	25 September	Somerset Sabres	Hyderabad	Lost by 5 wickets	Scorecard
4	27 September	South Australian Redbacks	Hyderabad	Lost by 19 runs	Scorecard
5	29 September	Royal Challengers Bangalore	Bangalore	Won by 9 wickets, MoM- Jacques Kallis 64* (47) and 1/28 (4 Overs)	Scorecard
6	1 October	Chevrolet Warriors	Bangalore	Won by 22 runs (D/L)	Scorecard
Failed to advance.
