= Sunanda Pushkar =

Indo-Canadian businessperson (1962–2014)

- Born: Sunanda Dass; 27 June 1962; Sopore, Jammu and Kashmir, India
- Died: 17 January 2014 (aged 51); New Delhi, India
- Citizenship: Canadian
- Spouses: Sanjay Raina (div. 1988) Sujith Menon (m. 1991; died 1997) Shashi Tharoor (m. 2010)
- Children: 1

Sunanda Pushkar (27 June 1962 – 17 January 2014) was an Indian-born Canadian businesswoman. She was a sales director in the Dubai-based TECOM Investments, and a co-owner of the India-based Rendezvous Sports World (RSW), a cricket franchise in the Indian Premier League. Pushkar was the wife of former International diplomat serving under the UN and politician Shashi Tharoor.

== Early life and education ==
Sunanda Pushkar (née Dass) was born on 27 June 1962 in a Kashmiri Pandit family of landlords and army officers native to Bomai, Sopore. She was the only daughter of Lt. Col. Pushkar Nath Dass and Jaya Dass. Her father retired from the army in 1983.

Pushkar has two brothers, one of whom works for a global software company in Dubai; the other is in the Indian Army. The family moved from Bomai to Jammu in 1990.

Pushkar studied at the Convent of Jesus and Mary, Ambala, and Kendriya Vidyalaya, Jhansi. She then graduated from Govt. Women's College in Srinagar, where she studied during 1986–88.

== Personal life ==
While studying at the Government College for women, where she was the president of the college, she married a fellow hotel management graduate Sanjay Raina. The couple divorced in 1988. Subsequently, Sunanda went to Dubai in 1989 and married Sujith Menon in 1991. Their son was born in November 1992. Sunanda was widowed when Sujith Menon died in an accident in 1997. In October 2009, she met Shashi Tharoor at a party organised by the billionaire Sunny Varkey. Tharoor had arrived in Dubai in 2007, with his Canadian wife Christa Giles. Sunanda married Shashi Tharoor in 2010, after he was elected to the Indian Parliament. The couple had a Malayali wedding ceremony in Tharoor's ancestral home at Elavanchery in Kerala, India. This was the third marriage for both of them.

== Business career ==
In India, Sunanda's first job was as the front desk receptionist at the Centaur Lake View hotel in Srinagar, after doing a course in hotel management. After coming to Dubai. She started an event management business called Expressions, and became well known for her networking with sponsors and artists for fashion shows. Her company organised several model shows for product launches, featuring several Indian fashion designers and models, including Hemant Trivedi, Rhea Pillai, Vikram Phadnis and Aishwarya Rai. Later, she joined Bozell Prime Advertising as a marketing manager. She and her second husband Sujith Menon organised a show, which made a financial loss. Sujith returned to India, and died in an accident in Delhi in March 1997.

After Sujith's death she left her four-year-old son with her sister-in-law, and later with her parents. By the time she brought him back to Dubai, he had developed a communication disorder. She left Bozell Prime to spend time with her son. She then went on to open a joint retail business of artificial jewelry in Dubai, called Ravissant Trading. She spelled her name as "Sue P. Menon" on her business cards, and later, started using "Pushkar" (an alternative spelling of her father's name) as her last name. According to her, she faced financial troubles, as she had to repay Sujith's debts, support her parents and her brother through engineering college.

Impressed by the Canadian healthcare system, she emigrated to Canada in the 1990, as her son needed speech therapy. According to Sunanda, she became a partner in an IT firm called "Valley Resources" through sweat equity, after a San Francisco-based friend introduced her to the founders. Subsequently, she became wealthy during the dot-com bubble, managing to buy her own house and a BMW car. The business was impacted by the post-9/11 slowdown and closed in 2001. After four months of unemployment and financial difficulties, Sunanda did a course in emotional intelligence, and joined a company called Noble House International. She organised "Human Potential Reengineering" programmes for several banks in Miami, Amsterdam and Geneva.

Sunanda felt that she was not earning enough at Noble House. In August 2004, she moved to Dubai with a Canadian passport, working as a general manager for Best Homes. Later, she joined TECOM investments to work on the International Media Production Zone. She was financially successful, buying two 3-bedroom apartments at Palm Jumeirah, an apartment in Jumeirah Beach Residence and two more apartments in the Executive Towers.

== Return to India ==
=== IPL controversy ===
When she was dating Tharoor, Sunanda started getting media attention in India, as it became known that she had been given sweat equity worth ₹700 million in Rendezvous Sports World. In 2010, the company bid for the Indian Premier League (IPL) cricket team Kochi Tuskers Kerala, which represented Tharoor's native state Kerala. The company was founded in 2009, while Sunanda was made a Director of the company on 25 February 2010, just 18 days before the IPL bid. There were allegations that Tharoor had misused his ministerial position to ask for a free stake in the company, and that Sunanda was acting as a proxy for him. In addition, the agreement guaranteed an additional 15% payout of topline revenue (not profits) for Sunanda Pushkar, which was clearly unreasonable, and was seen to be favouring Tharoor in a backhanded way. The controversy ultimately resulted in Tharoor's resignation as a minister. In her defence, Sunanda argued that she had been invited to join Rendezvous because of her "extensive international experience as a business executive, marketing manager and entrepreneur". She also stated that she had been given a similar offer by Karim Morani of Kolkata Knight Riders in the past. In April 2010, she announced that she had relinquished her stake in the company following the controversy. However, she continued to hold the stake, after she was told that there is no provision under the Board of Control for Cricket in India's IPL rules for surrender of shares at that stage.

=== Twitter incident ===
On 15 January 2014, a series of intimate messages, supposedly sent by the Pakistani journalist Mehr Tarar to Tharoor, were posted on Tharoor's Twitter account. The messages proclaimed Tarar's love for Tharoor. Tarar tried to downplay the incident by stating that her account had been hacked. However, Sunanda later stated that the account had not been hacked and that she had posted the messages to expose what she believed to be Mehr's stalking of her husband. She accused Mehr of being an ISI agent. Later, she stated that she did not want to go public about the matter, especially in an election year.

The next day, a note titled as "Joint statement by Sunanda and Shashi Tharoor" was published on Shashi Tharoor's Facebook page. The note stated that the couple was happily married, and that some personal comments not intended for publication had been misrepresented after being posted to Twitter. The note also stated that Sunanda had been hospitalised after being ill, and was seeking rest. Sunanda Tharoor was being treated for Lupus erythematosus, a deadly immune disorder which damages healthy tissues.

== Death ==
On 17 January 2014, a day after the Twitter controversy, Pushkar was found dead in room number 345 of the Leela Palace hotel in Chanakyapuri, New Delhi, where the couple were temporarily living while their house was being renovated and painted. Tharoor discovered her body when she did not wake up from her sleep in the evening. He informed the Delhi Police, who recovered the body from the hotel and sent it for postmortem. According to initial reports, Pushkar was suspected to have committed suicide. Later reports stated that the cause of death was unnatural; the doctors at the All India Institute of Medical Sciences gave a preliminary autopsy report that revealed injury marks on her body. They said that these injuries may or may not be the cause of death. The autopsy indicated that she died of drug overdose, most likely a combination of sedatives, other strong medicines and probably alcohol. An investigation was ordered by the Sub-Divisional Magistrate to examine the cause of poisoning and to ascertain if it was murder or suicide. Her body was cremated at Lodhi Crematorium in South Delhi.

Doctors at KIMS Hospital Trivandrum, who had examined her a few days earlier, said that Pushkar did not have serious health problems. However, she had hinted about her death in a Twitter reply hours before her body was recovered from the hotel.

On 1 July 2014, controversy over her death deepened when AIIMS doctor Sudhir Gupta claimed that he was pressured to give a false report in the case. On 10 October 2014, the medical team probing her death concluded that she died of poisoning.

On 6 January 2015, Delhi Police reported that Sunanda was murdered and filed a first information report in this regard. Pushkar's domestic help alleged that Pushkar had often fought with Tharoor on the phone, and days before her death had threatened Tharoor that she would "disclose everything" and as such, he would be "finished".

Subramanian Swamy, a BJP politician, tried to fight this case against Tharoor in January 2015. On 20 May 2015, a trial court allowed Delhi Police to conduct lie detector test on three suspects related to her death.

In May 2018, Tharoor was charged with abetment to suicide of his wife and marital cruelty under sections 306 and 498A of the Indian Penal Code. However Tharoor denied all the charges.

On 18 August 2021, Special Court in Delhi discharged Shashi Tharoor from all charges for Pushkar's death.

== See also ==
- List of unsolved deaths
- Shashi Tharoor
