= 2011 Rajasthan Royals season =

Indian Premier League cricket team season

Rajasthan Royals
2011 season
- Coach: Shane Warne
- Captain: Shane Warne
- Ground(s): Sawai Mansingh Stadium, Jaipur
- IPL: 6th
- Most runs: Rahul Dravid (343)
- Most wickets: Shane Warne (13)

Rajasthan Royals (RR) is a franchise cricket team based in Jaipur, India, which plays in the Indian Premier League (IPL). They were one of the ten teams that competed in the 2011 Indian Premier League. They were captained by Shane Warne. Rajasthan Royals finished 6th in the IPL and did not qualify for the champions league T20.

== IPL ==
=== Standings ===
Rajasthan Royals finished 6th in the league stage of IPL 2011.

Pos	Grp	Team	Pld	W	L	NR	Pts	NRR
1	B	Royal Challengers Bangalore (R)	14	9	4	1	19	0.326
2	B	Chennai Super Kings (C)	14	9	5	0	18	0.443
3	A	Mumbai Indians (3)	14	9	5	0	18	0.040
4	B	Kolkata Knight Riders (4)	14	8	6	0	16	0.433
5	A	Kings XI Punjab	14	7	7	0	14	−0.051
6	B	Rajasthan Royals	14	6	7	1	13	−0.691
7	A	Deccan Chargers	14	6	8	0	12	0.222
8	B	Kochi Tuskers Kerala	14	6	8	0	12	−0.214
9	A	Pune Warriors India	14	4	9	1	9	−0.134
10	A	Delhi Daredevils	14	4	9	1	9	−0.448

Source: ESPNcricinfo

Note: Top four teams qualified for the playoffs.
The top three teams also qualified for the Champions League Twenty20 while the fourth team played in the qualifying stage.

=== Match log ===
No.	Date	Opponent	Venue	Result	Man of the match	Scorecard
1	9 April 2011	Deccan Chargers	Hyderabad	Won by 8 wickets	Siddharth Trivedi 3/15	Scorecard
2	12 April 2011	Delhi Daredevils	Jaipur	Won by 6 wickets	Shane Warne 2/17	Scorecard
3	15 April 2011	Kolkata Knight Riders	Jaipur	Lost by 9 wickets		Scorecard
4	17 April 2011	Kolkata Knight Riders	Kolkata	Lost by 8 wickets		Scorecard
5	19 April 2011	Royal Challengers Bangalore	Bangalore	Match abandoned without a ball bowled due to rain		Scorecard
6	21 April 2011	Kings XI Punjab	Chandigarh	Lost by 48 runs		Scorecard
7	24 April 2011	Kochi Tuskers Kerala	Jaipur	Won by 8 wickets	Shane Warne 3/16	Scorecard
8	29 April 2011	Mumbai Indians	Jaipur	Won by 7 wickets	Johan Botha 45(39)& 3/6 (2 overs)	Scorecard
9	1 May 2011	Pune Warriors India	Jaipur	Won by 6 wickets	(New Zealand) Ross Taylor 47*(35)	Scorecard
10	4 May 2011	Chennai Super Kings	Chennai	Lost by 8 wickets		Scorecard
11	9 May 2011	Chennai Super Kings	Jaipur	Lost by 63 runs		Scorecard
12	11 May 2011	Royal Challengers Bangalore	Jaipur	Lost by 9 wickets		Scorecard
13	15 May 2011	Kochi Tuskers Kerala	Indore	Lost by 8 wickets		Scorecard
14	20 May 2011	Mumbai Indians	Mumbai	Won by 10 wickets	Shane Watson 89*(47) & 3/19	Scorecard
