= 2011 Delhi Daredevils season =

Indian Premier League cricket team season

Delhi Daredevils
2011 season
- Coach: Greg Shipperd
- Captain: Virender Sehwag
- Ground(s): Feroz Shah Kotla, Delhi
- IPL: 10th
- Most runs: Virender Sehwag (424)
- Most wickets: Morne Morkel (13)

Delhi Daredevils (DD) are a franchise cricket team based in Delhi, India, which plays in the Indian Premier League (IPL). They were one of the ten teams that competed in the 2011 Indian Premier League. They were captained by Virender Sehwag. Delhi Daredevils finished tenth in the IPL and did not qualify for the Champions League T20.

== Indian Premier League ==
=== Standings ===
Delhi Daredevils finished last in the league stage of IPL 2011.

Pos	Grp	Team	Pld	W	L	NR	Pts	NRR
1	B	Royal Challengers Bangalore (R)	14	9	4	1	19	0.326
2	B	Chennai Super Kings (C)	14	9	5	0	18	0.443
3	A	Mumbai Indians (3)	14	9	5	0	18	0.040
4	B	Kolkata Knight Riders (4)	14	8	6	0	16	0.433
5	A	Kings XI Punjab	14	7	7	0	14	−0.051
6	B	Rajasthan Royals	14	6	7	1	13	−0.691
7	A	Deccan Chargers	14	6	8	0	12	0.222
8	B	Kochi Tuskers Kerala	14	6	8	0	12	−0.214
9	A	Pune Warriors India	14	4	9	1	9	−0.134
10	A	Delhi Daredevils	14	4	9	1	9	−0.448

Source: ESPNcricinfo

Note: Top four teams qualified for the playoffs.
The top three teams also qualified for the Champions League Twenty20 while the fourth team played in the qualifying stage.

=== Match log ===
No	Date	Opponent	Venue	Result
1	10 April	Mumbai Indians	Delhi	Lost by 8 wickets
2	12 April	Rajasthan Royals	Jaipur	Lost by 6 wickets
3	17 April	Pune Warriors	Mumbai	Won by 3 wickets
4	19 April	Deccan Chargers	Delhi	Lost by 20 runs
5	23 April	Kings XI Punjab	Delhi	Won by 29 runs, MoM – David Warner
6	26 April	Royal Challengers	Delhi	Lost by 3 wickets
7	28 April	Kolkata Knight Riders	Delhi	Lost by 17 runs
8	30 April	Kochi Tuskers Kerala	Kochi	Won by 38 runs, MoM – Virender Sehwag 80 (47)
9	2 May	Kochi Tuskers Kerala	Delhi	Lost by 7 wickets
10	5 May	Deccan Chargers	Hyderabad	Won by 4 wickets, MoM – Virender Sehwag 119 (56)
11	7 May	Mumbai Indians	Mumbai	Lost by 32 runs
12	12 May	Chennai Super Kings	Chennai	Lost by 18 runs
13	15 May	Kings XI Punjab	Dharamsala	Lost by 29 runs
14	21 May	Pune Warriors	Delhi	Match abandoned

== Statistics ==
Most runs
Player	Runs
Virender Sehwag	424
Venugopal Rao	336
David Warner	324

Most wickets
Player	Wickets
Morné Morkel	13
Irfan Pathan	11
Ajit Agarkar	8
