= 2011 Royal Challengers Bangalore season =

Indian Premier League cricket team season

Royal Challengers Bangalore
2011 season
- Coach: Ray Jennings
- Captain: Daniel Vettori
- IPL: Runners-up
- CLT20: Runners-up
- Most runs: Chris Gayle (608)
- Most wickets: Sreenath Aravind (21)
- Most catches: Abhimanyu Mithun (7)

Royal Challengers Bangalore were one of the ten teams that took part in the 2011 Indian Premier League. They were captained by former New Zealand skipper Daniel Vettori and coached by Ray Jennings. They finished as runners-up of the tournament after losing to Chennai Super Kings in the final. With this, they qualified for the 2011 Champions League Twenty20, where they again finished runners-up after losing the final to the Mumbai Indians.

== Background ==
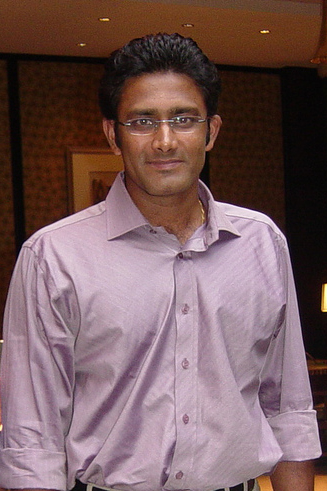
Anil Kumble, who captained RCB in 2009 and 2010, retired after the 2010 CLT20.

Royal Challengers had reached the semifinals in the 2010 edition of the IPL where they were defeated by the Mumbai Indians. They qualified for the 2010 Champions League Twenty20 as the third IPL team after beating Deccan Chargers in the qualification match. After a decent run in the CLT20, they were defeated by the Chennai Super Kings in the semifinals by 52 runs.

The 2010 season was also the last for their skipper Anil Kumble who had planned to retire from all forms of cricket. Kumble had taken over the captaincy from Rahul Dravid in 2009, after the team's poor showing in 2008, and led them to the finals in 2009 and semifinals in 2010.

== Pre-season player signings ==
With the addition of two more teams in the IPL for the 2011 season, it was declared by the IPL Governing Council that each franchise can retain a maximum of four players of their squad for the 2011 season, only three of whom can be Indian players, and the rest of the international players would be put in the mega-auction. The spending power for each franchise at the mega-auction was restricted to $9 million. The player retention clause also stated that if a franchise decides to retain four players, $4.5 million will be charged, leaving the franchise with only $4.5 million to spend at the auction.

The Royal Challengers retained only one player, Virat Kohli, for a price of $1.8 million, thus leaving them with $7.2 million to spend at the players auction. At the auction, they bought several top international cricketers like AB de Villiers, Daniel Vettori, Tillakaratne Dilshan, Zaheer Khan and Dirk Nannes. The most expensive buy at the auction, however, was Saurabh Tiwary who had an impressive 2010 IPL season with the Mumbai Indians, as he went for $1.6 million. Other Indian players bought at the auction include Cheteshwar Pujara, Mohammed Kaif and Abhimanyu Mithun.

The team management received a lot of criticism from the supporters at not retaining several top Twenty20 players like Jacques Kallis, Rahul Dravid, Kevin Pietersen, Dale Steyn, Ross Taylor and Robin Uthappa, who were instrumental in the team's success in the previous two seasons.

Two weeks into the start of IPL, fast bowler Dirk Nannes was injured and ruled out of the tournament. The franchise named Chris Gayle, who had gone unsold at the auction, as the replacement player.

=== List of players bought at the auction ===
- Tillakaratne Dilshan
- Zaheer Khan
- AB de Villiers
- Daniel Vettori
- Saurabh Tiwary
- Dirk Nannes
- Cheteshwar Pujara
- Charl Langeveldt
- Luke Pomersbach
- Abhimanyu Mithun
- Johan van der Wath
- Rilee Rossouw
- Nuwan Pradeep
- Jonathan Vandiar
- Mohammad Kaif

== Squad ==
Players with international caps before the start of 2011 IPL season are listed in bold.

No.	Name	Nationality	Birth date	Batting Style	Bowling Style	Notes
Batsmen
02	**Mohammad Kaif**	India	1 December 1980 (aged 30)	Right-handed	Right-arm off break	
03	**Cheteshwar Pujara**	India	25 January 1988 (aged 23)	Right-handed	Right-arm leg break	
09	Arun Karthik	India	15 February 1986 (aged 25)	Right-handed	Right-arm leg break	
12	**Luke Pomersbach**	Australia	28 September 1984 (aged 26)	Left-handed	Right-arm off break	Overseas
14	Mayank Agarwal	India	16 February 1991 (aged 20)	Right-handed	–	
18	**Virat Kohli**	India	5 November 1988 (aged 22)	Right-handed	Right-arm medium	Vice-captain
32	**Saurabh Tiwary**	India	30 December 1989 (aged 21)	Left-handed	Right-arm off break	
333	**Chris Gayle**	Jamaica	21 September 1979 (aged 31)	Left-handed	Right-arm off break	Overseas
–	Rilee Rossouw	South Africa	9 October 1989 (aged 21)	Left-handed	Right-arm off break	Overseas
–	Jonathan Vandiar	South Africa	25 April 1990 (aged 20)	Left-handed	Right-arm leg break	Overseas
All-rounders
07	Asad Pathan	India	17 June 1984 (aged 26)	Right-handed	Right-arm medium	
11	**Daniel Vettori**	New Zealand	27 January 1979 (aged 32)	Left-handed	Slow left arm orthodox	Captain
23	**Tillakaratne Dilshan**	Sri Lanka	14 October 1976 (aged 34)	Right-handed	Right-arm off break	Overseas
37	Rajoo Bhatkal	India	1 September 1985 (aged 25)	Right-handed	Right-arm medium	
Wicket-keepers
17	**AB de Villiers**	South Africa	17 February 1984 (aged 27)	Right-handed	Right-arm medium	Overseas
–	CM Gautam	India	8 March 1986 (aged 25)	Right-handed	–	
Bowlers
08	Syed Mohammed	India	3 June 1983 (aged 27)	Left-handed	Slow left arm orthodox	
25	**Abhimanyu Mithun**	India	25 October 1989 (aged 21)	Right-handed	Right arm medium-fast	
34	**Zaheer Khan**	India	7 October 1978 (aged 32)	Right-handed	Left-arm fast-medium	
63	**Dirk Nannes**	Australia	16 May 1976 (aged 34)	Right-handed	Left-arm fast	Overseas
67	**Charl Langeveldt**	South Africa	17 December 1974 (aged 36)	Right-handed	Right-arm fast-medium	Overseas
79	Sreenath Aravind	India	8 April 1984 (aged 26)	Left-handed	Left-arm medium-fast	
–	**Johan van der Wath**	South Africa	10 January 1978 (aged 33)	Right-handed	Right-arm medium-fast	Overseas
–	Nuwan Pradeep	Sri Lanka	19 October 1986 (aged 24)	Right-handed	Right-arm fast-medium	Overseas

== Indian Premier League ==
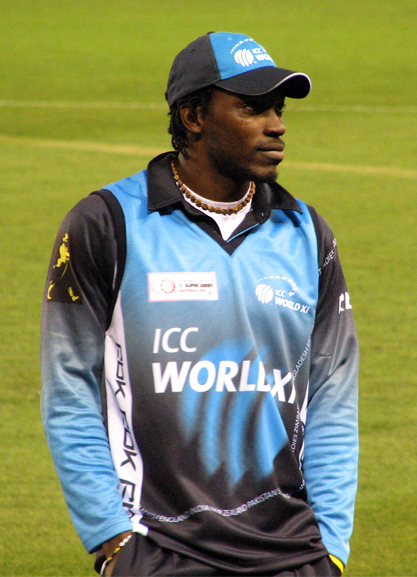
Chris Gayle won six Man of the Match awards in 12 games.

RCB kicked off their campaign with a comfortable six-wicket win over the newly formed team, Kochi Tuskers Kerala. But then they suffered three big defeats at the hands of Mumbai Indians, Deccan Chargers and Chennai Super Kings. At this stage, speedster Dirk Nannes was ruled out of the tournament and RCB team management named West Indian opener Chris Gayle as his replacement. Gayle started off the tournament with a century (102* off 55 balls) against Kolkata Knight Riders, giving the Challengers an emphatic 9-wicket win. RCB also managed to beat Delhi Daredevils and Pune Warriors in their next two matches. They went on to beat Kings XI Punjab by a big margin of 85 runs, after Gayle smashed his second century of the tournament (107 off 49 balls). They won their next two matches against Kochi and Rajasthan Royals, both comprehensively by 9 wickets. They also defeated Kolkata in a rain-affected match at Bangalore. But then, Kings XI Punjab, riding on a blistering hundred by their skipper Adam Gilchrist, ended RCB's 7-match winning streak, with a huge 111-run margin win. In their last league match, the Challengers beat the defending champions Chennai Super Kings by 8 wickets to end at the top of the points table. Chris Gayle shining once again with the bat, scoring an unbeaten 75 off 50 balls.

Royal Challengers faced Chennai Super Kings in the 1st qualifier at Mumbai. Virat Kohli scored an unbeaten 70 off just 44 balls to help RCB put up 175/4 in their 20 overs. Despite losing early wickets, Chennai went on to win the match by 6 wickets. The win took Chennai to the final and RCB faced Mumbai Indians in the 2nd qualifier in Chennai. Batting first, Royal Challengers made a massive 185/4 in 20 overs on a slow Chepauk track. Chris Gayle was the star once again for them as he scored a blistering 89 runs off 47 balls. Mumbai never looked in the hunt for a win as they collapsed to a 43-run defeat. The Royal Challengers qualified for the finals with this win and went on to face Chennai at their home ground in the finals. Winning the toss, Chennai elected to bat first in the finals. The Super Kings posted a huge total of 205/5. The Challengers did not bat well and lost the match by 58 runs. Chris Gayle was named Man of the Tournament and Bangalore set a new IPL record for the most successive wins by winning 7 matches on the trot.

=== League table ===
Pos	Grp	Team	Pld	W	L	NR	Pts	NRR
1	B	Royal Challengers Bangalore (R)	14	9	4	1	19	0.326
2	B	Chennai Super Kings (C)	14	9	5	0	18	0.443
3	A	Mumbai Indians (3)	14	9	5	0	18	0.040
4	B	Kolkata Knight Riders (4)	14	8	6	0	16	0.433
5	A	Kings XI Punjab	14	7	7	0	14	−0.051
6	B	Rajasthan Royals	14	6	7	1	13	−0.691
7	A	Deccan Chargers	14	6	8	0	12	0.222
8	B	Kochi Tuskers Kerala	14	6	8	0	12	−0.214
9	A	Pune Warriors India	14	4	9	1	9	−0.134
10	A	Delhi Daredevils	14	4	9	1	9	−0.448

Source: ESPNcricinfo

Note: Top four teams qualified for the playoffs.
The top three teams also qualified for the Champions League Twenty20 while the fourth team played in the qualifying stage.

=== Match log ===
No.	Date	Opponent	Venue	Result	Scorecard
1	9 April	Kochi Tuskers Kerala	Kochi	Won by 6 wickets, MoM – AB de Villiers 54* (40)	Scorecard
2	12 April	Mumbai Indians	Bangalore	Lost by 9 wickets	Scorecard
3	14 April	Deccan Chargers	Hyderabad	Lost by 33 runs	Scorecard
4	16 April	Chennai Super Kings	Chennai	Lost by 21 runs	Scorecard
5	19 April	Rajasthan Royals	Bangalore	No Result	
6	22 April	Kolkata Knight Riders	Kolkata	Won by 9 wickets, MoM – Chris Gayle 102* (55) and 0/9 (2 overs)	Scorecard
7	26 April	Delhi Daredevils	Delhi	Won by 3 wickets, MoM – Virat Kohli 56 (38)	Scorecard
8	29 April	Pune Warriors India	Bangalore	Won by 26 runs, MoM – Virat Kohli 67 (42)	Scorecard
9	6 May	Kings XI Punjab	Bangalore	Won by 85 runs, MoM – Chris Gayle 107 (49) and 3/21 (4 overs)	Scorecard
10	8 May	Kochi Tuskers Kerala	Bangalore	Won by 9 wickets, MoM – Chris Gayle 44 (16) and 1/26 (4 overs)	Scorecard
11	11 May	Rajasthan Royals	Jaipur	Won by 9 wickets, MoM – Sreenath Aravind 3/34 (4 overs)	Scorecard
12	14 May	Kolkata Knight Riders	Bangalore	Won by 4 wickets (D/L), MoM – Chris Gayle 38 (12) and 0/11 (1 over)	Scorecard
13	17 May	Kings XI Punjab	Dharmasala	Lost by 111 runs	Scorecard
14	22 May	Chennai Super Kings	Bangalore	Won by 8 wickets, MoM – Chris Gayle 75* (50) and 0/27 (3 overs)	Scorecard
1st Qualifying Final	24 May	Chennai Super Kings	Mumbai	Lost by 6 wickets	Scorecard
2nd Qualifying Final	27 May	Mumbai Indians	Chennai	Won by 43 runs, MoM – Chris Gayle 89* (47) and 0/11 (3 overs)	Scorecard
Final	28 May	Chennai Super Kings	Chennai	Lost by 58 runs	Scorecard
Overall record: 10–5. Runners-up. Qualified for 2011 Champions Trophy Twenty20.

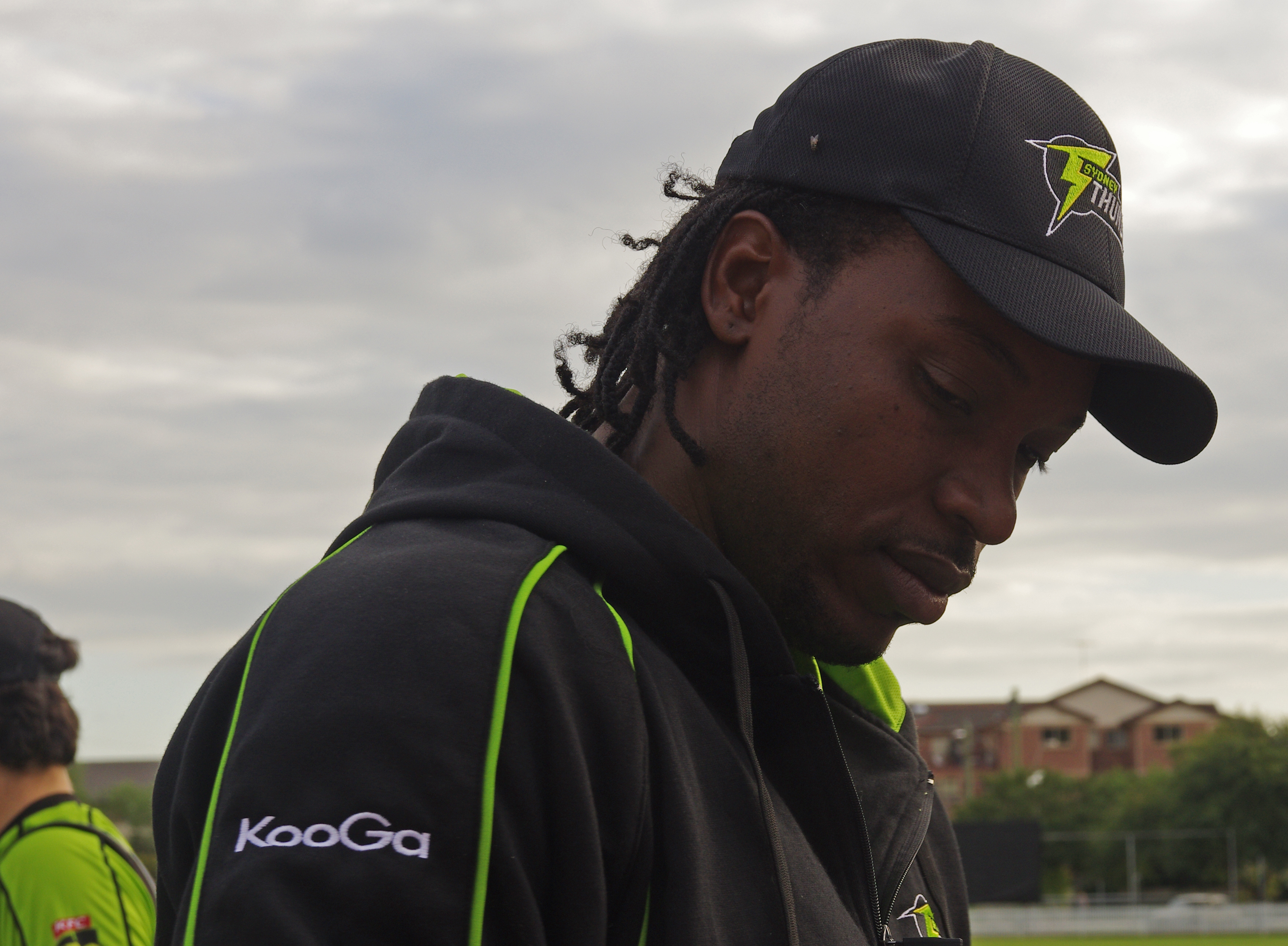
Gayle Scored the most runs in the 2011 season (608). He was also awarded the Player of the series

=== Most runs ===
Player	Innings	Runs	Average	Strike rate	Highest score	100s	50s
Chris Gayle	12	608	67.55	183.13	107	2	3
Virat Kohli	16	557	46.41	121.08	71	0	4
AB de Villiers	13	312	34.66	128.39	65	0	2
Tillakaratne Dilshan	10	226	28.25	125.55	59*	0	2
Saurabh Tiwary	13	187	23.37	99.46	42*	0	0

=== Most wickets ===
Player	Innings	Wickets	Average	Economy rate	Best bowling	4w
Sreenath Aravind	13	21	19.40	8.00	4/14	1
Zaheer Khan	15	14	32.50	7.71	3/32	0
Daniel Vettori	13	12	25.91	6.01	3/19	0
Chris Gayle	12	8	30.50	6.77	3/21	0
Charl Langeveldt	3	5	16.80	7.63	2/10	0

== Champions League Twenty20 ==
Royal Challengers Bangalore qualified for the main event of the 2011 Champions League Twenty20 as they finished runners-up in the 2011 Indian Premier League, this made the Challengers the first and only team ever to play in all the three seasons of the tournament. The Challengers, placed in Group B in the first round of the tournament, kicked of their quest for glory with a last-ball defeat to the Warriors. They suffered a big 9-wicket defeat at the hands of IPL counterparts Kolkata Knight Riders in their second group match, leaving them with two must-win matches in order to qualify for the semi-finals. They registered their first win in the competition, in emphatic manner, by beating Somerset by 51 runs, thanks to Chris Gayle's 46-ball 86. The win also consolidated their poor net run-rate. In their last group match, they faced the champions from Australia, the Southern Redbacks. Batting first, the Redbacks rode on a century by Daniel Harris (108* from 61 balls) to set RCB a target of 215. The Royal Challengers came out with a spirited batting performance with Tillakaratne Dilshan and Virat Kohli scoring half-centuries. However, the Redbacks hampered the run-chase by picking up wickets at regular stages towards the end of the innings. With six runs required off the last ball to win the match, RCB found an unlikely-hero in Arun Karthik, who struck Daniel Christian for a six over deep mid-wicket, to take RCB through to the semi-finals. The Challengers, despite being level on points with Kolkata Knight Riders and Warriors, qualified for the semis on basis of having a better net run-rate than the two teams.

The Royal Challengers played the New South Wales Blues in the semi-finals of the tournament. Winning the toss, Daniel Vettori put the Blues in to bat and the decision seemed to backfire as the Blues amassed 203/2 in 20 overs, mainly due to the efforts of David Warner who struck an unbeaten 123 off just 68 balls. Despite losing Dilshan early in the chase, RCB got off to a rollicking start with Chris Gayle smashing 92 runs from only 41 deliveries. He was ably supported by Kohli, who struck an unbeaten 84 from 49 balls to give RCB a comfortable 6-wicket victory with 9 balls to spare.

They took on an injury-hit Mumbai Indians in the final at Chennai. Mumbai winning the toss, chose to bat and put up a modest total of 139 in 20 overs. After getting off to a blistering start with the bat, the Challengers lost wickets at regular intervals before getting bundled out for 108 in 19.2 overs, falling short of the target by 31 runs. Mumbai skipper Harbhajan Singh was awarded the Man of the Match for picking 3/20 in his four overs.

=== Group table ===
Team	Pld	W	L	NR	Pts	NRR
Somerset	4	2	1	1	5	–0.557
Royal Challengers Bangalore	4	2	2	0	4	+0.325
Kolkata Knight Riders	4	2	2	0	4	+0.306
Warriors	4	2	2	0	4	+0.246
Southern Redbacks	4	1	2	1	3	−0.533

=== Match log ===
No.	Date	Opponent	Venue	Result	Scorecard
1	23 September 2011	Warriors	Bengaluru	Lost by 3 wickets	Scorecard
2	29 September 2011	Kolkata Knight Riders	Bengaluru	Lost by 9 wickets	Scorecard
3	3 October 2011	Somerset	Bengaluru	Won by 51 runs, MoM - Chris Gayle 86(46)	Scorecard
4	5 October 2011	Southern Redbacks	Bengaluru	Won by 2 wickets, MoM - Virat Kohli 70 (36)	Scorecard
Semi-Final	7 October 2011	New South Wales Blues	Bengaluru	Won by 6 wickets, MoM - Virat Kohli 84* (49)	Scorecard
Final	9 October 2011	Mumbai Indians	Chennai	Lost by 31 runs	Scorecard
Overall record: 3-3. Runners-up.

=== Most runs ===
Player	Innings	Runs	Average	Strike rate	Highest score	100s	50s
Chris Gayle	6	257	42.83	178.47	92	0	2
Virat Kohli	6	232	46.40	145.91	84*	0	2
Tillakaratne Dilshan	5	146	29.20	129.20	74	0	1

=== Most wickets ===
Player	Innings	Wickets	Average	Economy rate	Best bowling	4w
Daniel Vettori	6	7	23.00	7.00	2/25	0
Sreenath Aravind	6	6	41.50	10.82	2/23	0
Rajoo Bhatkal	5	5	26.40	8.80	3/21	0
