= List of Indian Premier League centuries =

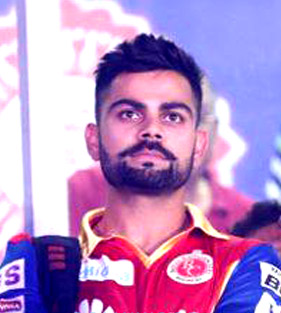
Virat Kohli is one of only two players to score 4 IPL centuries in a single season. (Note: The other being Jos Buttler.) He is also one of four players to score IPL centuries in back-to-back innings, (Note: The others being Buttler, Shikhar Dhawan and Shubman Gill.) and has the most IPL centuries with 9.

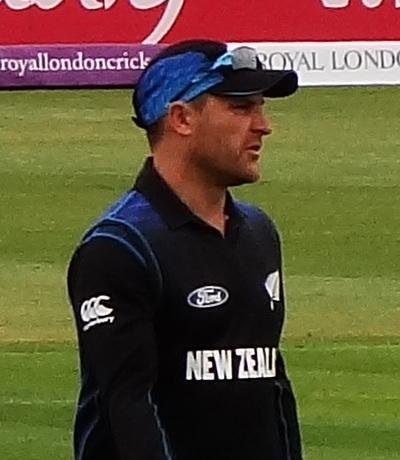
Brendon McCullum scored the first ever century in the history of the IPL.

In cricket, a batter reaches a century when he scores 100 runs or more in a single innings. A century is regarded as a landmark score for a batter, and his number of centuries is generally recorded in his career statistics. The Indian Premier League (IPL) is a professional league for Twenty20 cricket in India, which has been held annually since its first edition in 2008. Till date, 124 centuries have been scored by 63 different batsmen, out of which 32 are Indian players and 31 are overseas players. Players from 12 of the 15 franchises have scored centuries, with the three franchises that have not had a player score a century for them being Pune Warriors India, Kochi Tuskers Kerala and Gujarat Lions.

The first century in the league's history was scored in the inaugural match itself on 18 April 2008 at M. Chinnaswamy Stadium, Bangalore by Brendon McCullum for Kolkata Knight Riders against Royal Challengers Bangalore, scoring 158*, which is also one of the only three 150+ scores by individual batsmen in the league's history till date. The highest score in the competition was made by Chris Gayle, who scored 175* for Royal Challengers Bangalore against Pune Warriors India. In the same game, he scored the fastest century in terms of number of balls faced, scoring 100 runs in 30 deliveries. The slowest century was jointly scored by Manish Pandey and Virat Kohli, both for Royal Challengers Bengaluru, reaching the milestone in 67 deliveries.

The highest number of centuries have been scored by Virat Kohli (9 centuries) followed by Jos Buttler with 7, Chris Gayle and KL Rahul with 6 centuries each, and Shubman Gill and Sanju Samson with 5 centuries each. Shane Watson and David Warner have four centuries each. AB de Villiers, Quinton de Kock and Sai Sudharsan have scored three centuries each, while Adam Gilchrist, Murali Vijay, Virender Sehwag, Brendon McCullum, Hashim Amla, Ajinkya Rahane, Shikhar Dhawan, Ben Stokes, Rohit Sharma, Yashasvi Jaiswal, Ruturaj Gaikwad, Jonny Bairstow, Suryakumar Yadav, Heinrich Klaasen, Rishabh Pant, Abhishek Sharma, Vaibhav Sooryavanshi and Mitchell Marsh have scored two centuries each. Shikhar Dhawan, Jos Buttler, Virat Kohli and Shubman Gill are the only four players till date to have scored centuries in consecutive matches. 20 centuries have been scored by the players of Royal Challengers Bengaluru, more than any other team. The most centuries scored by an individual in a single season is 4, which was achieved by Virat Kohli in 2016 and Jos Buttler in 2022.

The first part of this list includes all IPL centuries organized in chronological order. Finally The second part of the list provides an overview of centuries by IPL seasons, and the third part provides an overview of centuries by IPL teams. Teams are initially listed in alphabetical order. (Note: To sort these tables by any statistic, click on the icon in the column title.) (Note: These statistics do not cover the games played in other tournaments such as the Champions League Twenty20, the British Asian Cup or the 2008 Kolkata Knight Riders tour of Australia.)

== Key ==
Symbol	Meaning
*	Remained not out
Balls	Balls faced during the innings
S/R.	Strike rate during the innings
Inn.	The innings of the match
Won	The match was won by the team for which the player played
Lost	The match was lost by the team for which the player played

== Centuries ==
Indian Premier League centuries
S/N	Score	Balls	S/R	Player	Team	Opposition	Inn.	Venue	Date	Result
1	158*	73	216.43	Brendon McCullum (1/2)	Kolkata Knight Riders	Royal Challengers Bangalore	1	M. Chinnaswamy Stadium, Bangalore	18 April 2008	Won
2	116*	54	214.81	Michael Hussey	Chennai Super Kings	Kings XI Punjab	1	PCA Stadium, Mohali	19 April 2008	Won
3	117*	53	220.75	Andrew Symonds	Deccan Chargers	Rajasthan Royals	1	Rajiv Gandhi International Cricket Stadium, Hyderabad	24 April 2008	Lost
4	109*	47	231.91	Adam Gilchrist (1/2)	Deccan Chargers	Mumbai Indians	2	Wankhede Stadium, Mumbai	27 April 2008	Won
5	114*	48	237.50	Sanath Jayasuriya	Mumbai Indians	Chennai Super Kings	2	Wankhede Stadium, Mumbai	14 May 2008	Won
6	115	69	166.66	Shaun Marsh	Kings XI Punjab	Rajasthan Royals	1	PCA Stadium, Mohali	28 May 2008	Won
7	105*	54	194.44	AB de Villiers (1/3)	Delhi Daredevils	Chennai Super Kings	1	Kingsmead Cricket Ground, Durban	23 April 2009	Won
8	114*	73	156.16	Manish Pandey	Royal Challengers Bangalore	Deccan Chargers	1	SuperSport Park, Centurion	21 May 2009	Won
9	100	37	270.27	Yusuf Pathan	Rajasthan Royals	Mumbai Indians	2	Brabourne Stadium, Mumbai	13 March 2010	Lost
10	107*	69	155.07	David Warner (1/4)	Delhi Daredevils	Kolkata Knight Riders	1	Feroz Shah Kotla Ground, Delhi	29 March 2010	Won
11	127	56	226.78	Murali Vijay (1/2)	Chennai Super Kings	Rajasthan Royals	1	MA Chidambaram Stadium, Chennai	3 April 2010	Won
12	110*	59	186.44	Mahela Jayawardene	Kings XI Punjab	Kolkata Knight Riders	2	Eden Gardens, Kolkata	4 April 2010	Won
13	120*	63	190.47	Paul Valthaty	Kings XI Punjab	Chennai Super Kings	2	PCA Stadium, Mohali	13 April 2011	Won
14	100*	66	151.51	Sachin Tendulkar	Mumbai Indians	Kochi Tuskers Kerala	1	Wankhede Stadium, Mumbai	15 April 2011	Lost
15	102*	55	185.45	Chris Gayle (1/6)	Royal Challengers Bangalore	Kolkata Knight Riders	2	Eden Gardens, Kolkata	22 April 2011	Won
16	119	56	212.50	Virender Sehwag (1/2)	Delhi Daredevils	Deccan Chargers	2	Rajiv Gandhi International Stadium, Hyderabad	5 May 2011	Won
17	107	49	218.36	Chris Gayle (2/6)	Royal Challengers Bangalore	Kings XI Punjab	1	M. Chinnaswamy Stadium, Bangalore	6 May 2011	Won
18	106	55	192.72	Adam Gilchrist (2/2)	Kings XI Punjab	Royal Challengers Bangalore	1	HPCA Stadium, Dharmasala	17 May 2011	Won
19	103*	60	171.66	Ajinkya Rahane (1/2)	Rajasthan Royals	Royal Challengers Bangalore	1	M. Chinnaswamy Stadium, Bangalore	15 April 2012	Won
20	103*	64	160.93	Kevin Pietersen	Delhi Daredevils	Deccan Chargers	2	Feroz Shah Kotla Ground, Delhi	19 April 2012	Won
21	109*	54	201.85	David Warner (2/4)	Delhi Daredevils	Deccan Chargers	2	Rajiv Gandhi International Stadium, Hyderabad	10 May 2012	Won
22	109*	60	181.66	Rohit Sharma (1/2)	Mumbai Indians	Kolkata Knight Riders	1	Eden Gardens, Kolkata	12 May 2012	Won
23	128*	62	206.45	Chris Gayle (3/6)	Royal Challengers Bangalore	Delhi Daredevils	1	Feroz Shah Kotla Ground, Delhi	17 May 2012	Won
24	113	58	194.82	Murali Vijay (2/2)	Chennai Super Kings	Delhi Daredevils	1	MA Chidambaram Stadium, Chennai	25 May 2012	Won
25	101	58	165.57	Shane Watson (1/4)	Rajasthan Royals	Chennai Super Kings	1	MA Chidambaram Stadium, Chennai	22 April 2013	Lost
26	175*	66	265.15	Chris Gayle (4/6)	Royal Challengers Bangalore	Pune Warriors India	1	M. Chinnaswamy Stadium, Bangalore	23 April 2013	Won
27	100*	53	188.67	Suresh Raina	Chennai Super Kings	Kings XI Punjab	1	MA Chidambaram Stadium, Chennai	2 May 2013	Won
28	101*	38	265.78	David Miller	Kings XI Punjab	Royal Challengers Bangalore	2	PCA Stadium, Mohali	6 May 2013	Won
29	100*	61	163.93	Lendl Simmons	Mumbai Indians	Kings XI Punjab	2	PCA Stadium, Mohali	21 May 2014	Won
30	122	58	210.34	Virender Sehwag (2/2)	Kings XI Punjab	Chennai Super Kings	1	Wankhede Stadium, Mumbai	30 May 2014	Won
31	115*	55	209.09	Wriddhiman Saha	Kings XI Punjab	Kolkata Knight Riders	1	M. Chinnaswamy Stadium, Bangalore	1 June 2014	Lost
32	100*	56	178.57	Brendon McCullum (2/2)	Chennai Super Kings	Sunrisers Hyderabad	1	M. A. Chidambaram Stadium, Chennai	11 April 2015	Won
33	117	57	205.3	Chris Gayle (5/6)	Royal Challengers Bangalore	Kings XI Punjab	1	M. Chinnaswamy Stadium, Bangalore	6 May 2015	Won
34	133*	59	225.42	AB de Villiers (2/3)	Royal Challengers Bangalore	Mumbai Indians	1	Wankhede Stadium, Mumbai	10 May 2015	Won
35	104*	59	176.27	Shane Watson (2/4)	Rajasthan Royals	Kolkata Knight Riders	1	Brabourne Stadium, Mumbai	16 May 2015	Won
36	108	51	211.76	Quinton de Kock (1/3)	Delhi Daredevils	Royal Challengers Bangalore	2	M. Chinnaswamy Stadium, Bangalore	17 April 2016	Won
37	100*	63	158.73	Virat Kohli (1/9)	Royal Challengers Bangalore	Gujarat Lions	1	Saurashtra Cricket Association Stadium, Rajkot	24 April 2016	Lost
38	101	54	187.03	Steve Smith	Rising Pune Supergiants	Gujarat Lions	1	MCA Cricket Ground, Pune	29 April 2016	Lost
39	108*	58	186.20	Virat Kohli (2/9)	Royal Challengers Bangalore	Rising Pune Supergiants	2	M. Chinnaswamy Stadium, Bangalore	7 May 2016	Won
40	129*	52	248.07	AB de Villiers (3/3)	Royal Challengers Bangalore	Gujarat Lions	1	M. Chinnaswamy Stadium, Bangalore	14 May 2016	Won
41	109	55	198.18	Virat Kohli (3/9)	Royal Challengers Bangalore	Gujarat Lions	1	M. Chinnaswamy Stadium, Bangalore	14 May 2016	Won
42	113	50	226.0	Virat Kohli (4/9)	Royal Challengers Bangalore	Kings XI Punjab	1	M. Chinnaswamy Stadium, Bangalore	18 May 2016	Won
43	102	63	161.90	Sanju Samson (1/5)	Delhi Daredevils	Rising Pune Supergiant	1	MCA Cricket Ground, Pune	11 April 2017	Won
44	104*	60	173.3	Hashim Amla (1/2)	Kings XI Punjab	Mumbai Indians	1	Holkar Stadium, Indore	20 April 2017	Lost
45	126	59	213.55	David Warner (3/4)	Sunrisers Hyderabad	Kolkata Knight Riders	1	Rajiv Gandhi International Stadium, Hyderabad	30 April 2017	Won
46	103*	63	163.49	Ben Stokes (1/2)	Rising Pune Supergiants	Gujarat Lions	2	MCA Cricket Ground, Pune	1 May 2017	Won
47	104	60	173.33	Hashim Amla (2/2)	Kings XI Punjab	Gujarat Lions	1	PCA Stadium, Mohali	7 May 2017	Lost
48	104*	63	165.08	Chris Gayle (6/6)	Kings XI Punjab	Sunrisers Hyderabad	1	PCA Stadium, Mohali	19 April 2018	Won
49	106	57	185.96	Shane Watson (3/4)	Chennai Super Kings	Rajasthan Royals	1	MCA Cricket Ground, Pune	20 April 2018	Won
50	128*	63	203.17	Rishabh Pant (1/2)	Delhi Daredevils	Sunrisers Hyderabad	1	Feroz Shah Kotla Ground, Delhi	10 May 2018	Lost
51	100*	62	161.29	Ambati Rayudu	Chennai Super Kings	Sunrisers Hyderabad	2	MCA Cricket Ground, Pune	13 May 2018	Won
52	117*	57	205.26	Shane Watson (4/4)	Chennai Super Kings	Sunrisers Hyderabad	2	Wankhede Stadium, Mumbai	27 May 2018	Won
53	102*	55	185.45	Sanju Samson (2/5)	Rajasthan Royals	Sunrisers Hyderabad	1	Rajiv Gandhi International Stadium, Hyderabad	29 March 2019	Lost
54	114	56	203.57	Jonny Bairstow (1/2)	Sunrisers Hyderabad	Royal Challengers Bangalore	1	Rajiv Gandhi International Stadium, Hyderabad	31 March 2019	Won
55	100*	55	181.81	David Warner (4/4)	Sunrisers Hyderabad	Royal Challengers Bangalore	1	Rajiv Gandhi International Stadium, Hyderabad	31 March 2019	Won
56	100*	64	156.25	KL Rahul (1/6)	Kings XI Punjab	Mumbai Indians	1	Wankhede Stadium, Mumbai	10 April 2019	Lost
57	100	58	172.41	Virat Kohli (5/9)	Royal Challengers Bangalore	Kolkata Knight Riders	1	Eden Gardens, Kolkata	19 April 2019	Won
58	105*	63	166.66	Ajinkya Rahane (2/2)	Rajasthan Royals	Delhi Capitals	1	Sawai Mansingh Stadium, Jaipur	22 April 2019	Lost
59	132*	69	191.30	KL Rahul (2/6)	Kings XI Punjab	Royal Challengers Bangalore	1	Dubai International Cricket Stadium, Dubai	24 September 2020	Won
60	106	50	212.00	Mayank Agarwal	Kings XI Punjab	Rajasthan Royals	1	Sharjah Cricket Stadium, Sharjah	27 September 2020	Lost
61	101*	58	174.13	Shikhar Dhawan (1/2)	Delhi Capitals	Chennai Super Kings	2	Sharjah Cricket Stadium, Sharjah	17 October 2020	Won
62	106*	61	173.77	Shikhar Dhawan (2/2)	Delhi Capitals	Kings XI Punjab	1	Dubai International Cricket Stadium, Dubai	20 October 2020	Lost
63	107*	60	178.33	Ben Stokes (2/2)	Rajasthan Royals	Mumbai Indians	2	Sheikh Zayed Cricket Stadium, Abu Dhabi	25 October 2020	Won
64	119	63	188.88	Sanju Samson (3/5)	Rajasthan Royals	Punjab Kings	2	Wankhede Stadium, Mumbai	12 April 2021	Lost
65	101*	52	194.23	Devdutt Padikkal	Royal Challengers Bangalore	Rajasthan Royals	2	Wankhede Stadium, Mumbai	22 April 2021	Won
66	124	64	193.75	Jos Buttler (1/7)	Rajasthan Royals	Sunrisers Hyderabad	1	Arun Jaitley Stadium, Delhi	2 May 2021	Won
67	101*	60	168.33	Ruturaj Gaikwad (1/2)	Chennai Super Kings	Rajasthan Royals	1	Sheikh Zayed Cricket Stadium, Abu Dhabi	2 October 2021	Lost
68	100	68	147.05	Jos Buttler (2/7)	Rajasthan Royals	Mumbai Indians	1	DY Patil Stadium, Navi Mumbai	2 April 2022	Won
69	103*	60	171.66	KL Rahul (3/6)	Lucknow Super Giants	Mumbai Indians	1	Brabourne Stadium, Mumbai	16 April 2022	Won
70	103	61	168.85	Jos Buttler (3/7)	Rajasthan Royals	Kolkata Knight Riders	1	Brabourne Stadium, Mumbai	18 April 2022	Won
71	116	65	178.46	Jos Buttler (4/7)	Rajasthan Royals	Delhi Capitals	1	Wankhede Stadium, Mumbai	22 April 2022	Won
72	103*	62	166.12	KL Rahul (4/6)	Lucknow Super Giants	Mumbai Indians	1	Wankhede Stadium, Mumbai	24 April 2022	Won
73	140*	70	200.00	Quinton de Kock (2/3)	Lucknow Super Giants	Kolkata Knight Riders	1	DY Patil Stadium, Navi Mumbai	18 May 2022	Won
74	112*	54	207.40	Rajat Patidar	Royal Challengers Bangalore	Lucknow Super Giants	1	Eden Gardens, Kolkata	25 May 2022	Won
75	106*	60	176.66	Jos Buttler (5/7)	Rajasthan Royals	Royal Challengers Bangalore	2	Narendra Modi Stadium, Ahmedabad	27 May 2022	Won
76	100*	55	181.81	Harry Brook	Sunrisers Hyderabad	Kolkata Knight Riders	1	Eden Gardens, Kolkata	14 April 2023	Won
77	104	51	203.92	Venkatesh Iyer	Kolkata Knight Riders	Mumbai Indians	1	Wankhede Stadium, Mumbai	16 April 2023	Lost
78	124	62	200.00	Yashasvi Jaiswal (1/2)	Rajasthan Royals	Mumbai Indians	1	Wankhede Stadium, Mumbai	30 April 2023	Lost
79	103*	49	210.20	Suryakumar Yadav (1/2)	Mumbai Indians	Gujarat Titans	1	Wankhede Stadium, Mumbai	12 May 2023	Won
80	103	65	158.46	Prabhsimran Singh	Punjab Kings	Delhi Capitals	1	Arun Jaitley Stadium, Delhi	13 May 2023	Won
81	101	58	174.13	Shubman Gill (1/5)	Gujarat Titans	Sunrisers Hyderabad	1	Narendra Modi Stadium, Ahmedabad	15 May 2023	Won
82	104	51	203.92	Heinrich Klaasen (1/2)	Sunrisers Hyderabad	Royal Challengers Bangalore	1	Rajiv Gandhi International Stadium, Hyderabad	18 May 2023	Lost
83	100	63	158.73	Virat Kohli (6/9)	Royal Challengers Bangalore	Sunrisers Hyderabad	2	Rajiv Gandhi International Stadium, Hyderabad	18 May 2023	Won
84	100*	47	212.77	Cameron Green	Mumbai Indians	Sunrisers Hyderabad	2	Wankhede Stadium, Mumbai	21 May 2023	Won
85	101*	61	165.57	Virat Kohli (7/9)	Royal Challengers Bangalore	Gujarat Titans	1	M. Chinnaswamy Stadium, Bengaluru	21 May 2023	Lost
86	104*	52	200.00	Shubman Gill (2/5)	Gujarat Titans	Royal Challengers Bangalore	2	M. Chinnaswamy Stadium, Bengaluru	21 May 2023	Won
87	129	60	215.00	Shubman Gill (3/5)	Gujarat Titans	Mumbai Indians	1	Narendra Modi Stadium, Ahmedabad	26 May 2023	Won
88	113*	72	156.94	Virat Kohli (8/9)	Royal Challengers Bengaluru	Rajasthan Royals	1	Sawai Mansingh Stadium, Jaipur	6 April 2024	Lost
89	100*	58	172.41	Jos Buttler (6/7)	Rajasthan Royals	Royal Challengers Bengaluru	2	Sawai Mansingh Stadium, Jaipur	6 April 2024	Won
90	105*	63	166.66	Rohit Sharma (2/2)	Mumbai Indians	Chennai Super Kings	2	Wankhede Stadium, Mumbai	14 April 2024	Lost
91	102	41	248.78	Travis Head	Sunrisers Hyderabad	Royal Challengers Bengaluru	1	M. Chinnaswamy Stadium, Bengaluru	15 April 2024	Won
92	109	56	194.64	Sunil Narine	Kolkata Knight Riders	Rajasthan Royals	1	Eden Gardens, Kolkata	16 April 2024	Lost
93	107*	60	178.33	Jos Buttler (7/7)	Rajasthan Royals	Kolkata Knight Riders	2	Eden Gardens, Kolkata	16 April 2024	Won
94	104*	60	173.33	Yashasvi Jaiswal (2/2)	Rajasthan Royals	Mumbai Indians	2	Sawai Mansingh Stadium, Jaipur	22 April 2024	Won
95	108*	60	180.00	Ruturaj Gaikwad (2/2)	Chennai Super Kings	Lucknow Super Giants	1	M. A. Chidambaram Stadium, Chennai	23 April 2024	Lost
96	124*	63	196.83	Marcus Stoinis	Lucknow Super Giants	Chennai Super Kings	2	M. A. Chidambaram Stadium, Chennai	23 April 2024	Won
97	108*	48	225.00	Jonny Bairstow (2/2)	Punjab Kings	Kolkata Knight Riders	2	Eden Gardens, Kolkata	26 April 2024	Won
98	100*	41	243.90	Will Jacks	Royal Challengers Bengaluru	Gujarat Titans	2	Narendra Modi Stadium, Ahmedabad	28 April 2024	Won
99	102*	51	200.00	Suryakumar Yadav (2/2)	Mumbai Indians	Sunrisers Hyderabad	2	Wankhede Stadium, Mumbai	6 May 2024	Won
100	104	55	189.09	Shubman Gill (4/5)	Gujarat Titans	Chennai Super Kings	1	Narendra Modi Stadium, Ahmedabad	10 May 2024	Won
101	103	51	201.96	Sai Sudharsan (1/2)	Gujarat Titans	Chennai Super Kings	1	Narendra Modi Stadium, Ahmedabad	10 May 2024	Won
102	106*	47	225.53	Ishan Kishan	Sunrisers Hyderabad	Rajasthan Royals	1	Rajiv Gandhi International Cricket Stadium, Hyderabad	23 March 2025	Won
103	103	42	245.24	Priyansh Arya	Punjab Kings	Chennai Super Kings	1	Maharaja Yadavindra Singh International Cricket Stadium, Mullanpur	8 April 2025	Won
104	141	55	256.36	Abhishek Sharma (1/2)	Sunrisers Hyderabad	Punjab Kings	2	Rajiv Gandhi International Cricket Stadium, Hyderabad	12 April 2025	Won
105	101	38	265.78	Vaibhav Sooryavanshi (1/2)	Rajasthan Royals	Gujarat Titans	2	Sawai Mansingh Stadium, Jaipur	28 April 2025	Won
106	112*	65	172.30	KL Rahul (5/6)	Delhi Capitals	Gujarat Titans	1	Arun Jaitley Cricket Stadium, Delhi	18 May 2025	Lost
107	108*	61	177.04	Sai Sudharsan (2/3)	Gujarat Titans	Delhi Capitals	2	Arun Jaitley Cricket Stadium, Delhi	18 May 2025	Won
108	117	64	182.81	Mitchell Marsh (1/2)	Lucknow Super Giants	Gujarat Titans	1	Narendra Modi Stadium, Ahmedabad	22 May 2025	Won
109	105*	39	269.23	Heinrich Klaasen (2/2)	Sunrisers Hyderabad	Kolkata Knight Riders	1	Arun Jaitley Cricket Stadium, Delhi	25 May 2025	Won
110	118*	61	193.44	Rishabh Pant (2/2)	Lucknow Super Giants	Royal Challengers Bengaluru	1	Ekana Cricket Stadium, Lucknow	27 May 2025	Lost
111	115*	56	205.35	Sanju Samson (4/5)	Chennai Super Kings	Delhi Capitals	1	M. A. Chidambaram Stadium, Chennai	11 April 2026	Won
112	112*	60	186.66	Quinton de Kock (3/3)	Mumbai Indians	Punjab Kings	1	Wankhede Stadium, Mumbai	16 April 2026	Lost
113	101*	45	224.44	Tilak Varma	Mumbai Indians	Gujarat Titans	1	Narendra Modi Stadium, Ahmedabad	20 April 2026	Won
114	135*	68	198.52	Abhishek Sharma (2/2)	Sunrisers Hyderabad	Delhi Capitals	1	Rajiv Gandhi International Cricket Stadium, Hyderabad	21 April 2026	Won
115	101*	54	187.03	Sanju Samson (5/5)	Chennai Super Kings	Mumbai Indians	1	Wankhede Stadium, Mumbai	23 April 2026	Won
116	100	58	172.41	Sai Sudharsan (3/3)	Gujarat Titans	Royal Challengers Bengaluru	1	M. Chinnaswamy Stadium, Bengaluru	24 April 2026	Lost
117	152*	67	226.86	KL Rahul (6/6)	Delhi Capitals	Punjab Kings	1	Arun Jaitley Cricket Stadium,New Delhi	25 April 2026	Lost
118	103	37	278.37	Vaibhav Sooryavanshi (2/2)	Rajasthan Royals	Sunrisers Hyderabad	1	Sawai Mansingh Stadium, Jaipur	25 April 2026	Lost
119	123*	55	223.63	Ryan Rickelton	Mumbai Indians	Sunrisers Hyderabad	1	Wankhede Stadium, Mumbai	29 April 2026	Lost
120	107*	59	181.35	Cooper Connolly	Punjab Kings	Sunrisers Hyderabad	2	Rajiv Gandhi International Stadium, Hyderabad	6 May 2026	Lost
121	111	56	198.21	Mitchell Marsh (2/2)	Lucknow Super Giants	Royal Challengers Bengaluru	1	Ekana Cricket Stadium, Lucknow	7 May 2026	Won
122	100*	47	212.76	Finn Allen	Kolkata Knight Riders	Delhi Capitals	1	Arun Jaitley Stadium, Delhi	8 May 2026	Won
123	105*	60	175.00	Virat Kohli (9/9)	Royal Challengers Bangalore	Kolkata Knight Riders	1	Shaheed Veer Narayan Singh International Cricket Stadium, Raipur	13 May 2026	Won
124	101*	51	198.03	Shreyas Iyer	Punjab Kings	Lucknow Super Giants	2	Ekana Cricket Stadium, Lucknow	23 May 2026	Won
125	104	53	196.22	Shubman Gill (5/5)	Gujarat Titans	Rajasthan Royals	2	Maharaja Yadavindra Singh International Cricket Stadium, Mullanpur	29 May 2026	Won

== Season overview ==
2026 hold the record for the most centuries in a year with 15, while only 2 centuries were scored in 2009.

Season wise statistics for century scores
Year	No. of centuries	Highest score	Highest scorer
2008	6	158*	Brendon McCullum
2009	2	114*	Manish Pandey
2010	4	127	Murali Vijay
2011	6	120*	Paul Valthaty
2012	6	128*	Chris Gayle
2013	4	175*	Chris Gayle
2014	3	122	Virender Sehwag
2015	4	133*	AB de Villiers
2016	7	129*	AB de Villiers
2017	5	126	David Warner
2018	5	128*	Rishabh Pant
2019	6	114	Jonny Bairstow
2020	5	132*	K. L. Rahul
2021	4	124	Jos Buttler
2022	8	140*	Quinton de Kock
2023	12	129	Shubman Gill
2024	14	124*	Marcus Stoinis
2025	9	141	Abhishek Sharma
2026	15	152*	KL Rahul

== Team overview ==
Punjab Kings has the most overall centurions, with 16 different players scoring centuries for them, while Gujarat Titans, Deccan Chargers, and Rising Pune Supergiant have the least, with 2 players scoring a century. Brendon McCullum and KL Rahul are the only players to register the highest score for multiple franchises.

Team statistics for century scores
Team	No. of matches	No. of centurions	No. of centuries	Highest score	Highest scorer
Chennai Super Kings	239	8	12	127	Murali Vijay
Deccan Chargers	75	2	2	117*	Andrew Symonds
Delhi Capitals	253	9	12	152*	KL Rahul
Gujarat Lions	30	0	0	84	Suresh Raina
Gujarat Titans	76	2	8	129	Shubman Gill
Kochi Tuskers Kerala	14	0	0	81	Brendon McCullum
Kolkata Knight Riders	252	4	4	158*	Brendon McCullum
Lucknow Super Giants	44	5	7	140*	Quinton de Kock
Mumbai Indians	261	9	11	123*	Ryan Rickelton
Pune Warriors India	46	0	0	86	Jesse Ryder
Punjab Kings	247	16	18	132*	KL Rahul
Rajasthan Royals	222	8	19	124	Jos Buttler and Yashasvi Jaiswal
Rising Pune Supergiant	30	2	2	103*	Ben Stokes
Royal Challengers Bengaluru	256	7	20	175*	Chris Gayle
Sunrisers Hyderabad	182	7	10	141	Abhishek Sharma

== See also ==
- List of Indian Premier League records and statistics
- Orange Cap
- List of Indian Premier League five-wicket hauls
