= Vignesh =

Vignesh may refer to:

- Vignesh (actor) (born 1968), Indian actor
- Vignesh Karthick, Tamil television actor
- Gunashekar Vignesh (born 1988), Indian footballer
- Ganapathi Vignesh (born 1981), Indian cricketer
- RJ Vigneshkanth, Tamil comedian

== See also ==
- Vignesh, another name for the Hindu deity Ganesha
