= K. Vasudevadas =

Indian cricketer (born 1985)

Kuthethurshri Vasudevadas (born 26 January 1985) is an Indian former first class cricketer. He was a left-hand batsman and a leg-break bowler. He played for Tamil Nadu from 2004 to 2014. He made his List A debut on 8 February 2004 against Rajasthan in which he did not get to bat. He made his first-class debut on 14–17 February against England A in which he scored 98. He was signed by the Chennai Super Kings in 2011. But he did not play a match for them.
