= Rendezvous Sports World =

Cricket franchise in the Indian Premier League

Rendezvous Sports World Private Limited
- Company type: Holding company
- Industry: Sports; Sports services
- Founded: 2009
- Founder: Kisan Gaikwad; Pushpa Gaikwad; Pradeep Gaikwad
- Key people: Kisan Gaikwad
- Owner: Kisan Gaikwad; Pushpa Gaikwad; Pradeep Gaikwad (100%)
- Number of employees: 229 (2020)
- Subsidiaries: Kochi Tuskers Kerala (100%)
- Website: Official website

Rendezvous Sports World Private Limited (RSW) was a cricket franchise in the Indian Premier League which had 100% of equity on Kochi IPL Team. Rendezvous Sports World Limited is a consortium made up of multiple companies. It had made the winning bid of US$333 million in a global invitation to tender process called by the IPL for two new franchises from IPL season 2011.

In April 2010, it threatened to sue IPL commissioner Lalit Modi for breaking confidentiality terms by disclosing details of the stakeholders in the new Kochi IPL team on the micro-blogging website Twitter.

== Franchise history ==
The auction for expanding the initial eight franchises for the Indian Premier League was held on 22 March 2010. The cities involved were Pune, Ahmedabad, Kochi, Nagpur, Kanpur, Dharamsala, Visakhapatnam, Rajkot, Cuttack, Vadodara, Indore and Gwalior. Two new teams were selected out of 12 cities. Sahara Group made the highest bid in the auction and chose to base its team in Pune, at the cost of US$370m (₹1702 crore). Rendezvous Sports World made the second highest bid of US$333.2m (₹1533 crores), and elected to base its team in Kochi. The two new franchises were sold for a combined sum greater than the combined purchase price of the original eight franchises.
