= Anand Rajan =

Indian cricketer (born 1987)

Personal information
- Full name: Anand Rajan
- Born: 17 April 1987 (age 39); Nagpur, Maharashtra, India
- Batting: Right-handed
- Bowling: Right-arm Medium
- Role: Bowler

Domestic team information
- Years: Team
- 2011-2012: Deccan Chargers
- 2013: Sunrisers Hyderabad
- FC debut: 9 December 2005 Madhya Pradesh v Jharkhand
- Last FC: 29 November 2011 Madhya Pradesh v Gujarat
- LA debut: 10 Feb 2006 Madhya Pradesh v Rajasthan
- Last LA: 6 Mar 2012 Madhya Pradesh v Bengal

Career statistics
Competition	FC	List A	T20
Matches	27	13	25
Runs scored	250	14	0
Batting average	13.15	14	0
100s/50s	0/0	0/0	0/0
Top score	84	7	0
Balls bowled	4,945	468	545
Wickets	87	7	40
Bowling average	31.35	48.71	15.40
5 wickets in innings	3	0	0
10 wickets in match	1	0	0
Best bowling	6/45	1/16	4/26
Catches/stumpings	11/0	2/0	15/0
- Source: ESPNcricinfo, 31 May 2012

Anand Rajan is an Indian former first-class cricketer who played for Madhya Pradesh. He was also a member of IPL team Deccan Chargers.
