= Ganapathi Vignesh =

Indian cricketer (born 1981)

Personal information
- Born: 11 August 1981 (age 45); Madras, Tamil Nadu, India
- Batting: Right-handed
- Bowling: Right-arm medium-fast
- Role: All-rounder

Career statistics
Competition	FC	LA	T20
Matches	8	8	5
Runs scored	47	19	54
Batting average	5.87	6.33	18.00
100s/50s	0/0	0/0	0/0
Top score	20	11	42
Balls bowled	940	380	108
Wickets	13	11	7
Bowling average	1.46	29.81	15.28
5 wickets in innings	0	0	0
10 wickets in match	0	0	0
Best bowling	3/50	3/39	2/21
Catches/stumpings	1/–	0/–	2/–
- Source: ESPNcricinfo, 8 August 2025

Ganapathi Vignesh (born 11 August 1981) is an Indian former first-class cricketer. He was part of Indian World Team in the Indian Cricket League Twenty20 competition. During 2008, Vignesh played half a season playing English club cricket for Birkenhead Park Cricket Club in the Cheshire County Cricket League. Known for his opening bowling and aggressive opening batting he has been selected by Chennai Super Kings for the IPL 2011 edition.
