= Sunny Sohal =

Indian cricketer

Personal information
- Full name: Sunny Sohal
- Born: 10 November 1987 (age 39); Mohali, Punjab, India
- Batting: Right handed
- Bowling: Legbreak
- Role: Batsman

International information
- National side: United States
- T20I debut (cap 16): 22 August 2019 v Bermuda
- Last T20I: 25 August 2019 v Canada

Domestic team information
- Years: Team
- 2005/06–2009/10: Punjab
- 2008–2010: Kings XI Punjab
- 2011: Deccan Chargers
- 2018: Barbados Tridents (squad no. 19)

Career statistics
Competition	T20I	FC	LA
Matches	3	21	25
Runs scored	23	1,202	439
Batting average	11.50	36.42	19.08
100s/50s	0/2	3/7	0/3
Top score	18	110*	65
Balls bowled	–	60	–
Wickets	–	1	–
Bowling average	–	13	–
5 wickets in innings	–	0	–
10 wickets in match	–	0	–
Best bowling	–	1/8	–
Catches/stumpings	0/–	7/–	7/–
- Source: ESPNcricinfo, 25 August 2019

Sunny Sohal (born 10 November 1987) is an Indian-born American former cricketer from Mohali, Punjab, India. A right-handed batsman and occasional leg spin bowler, Sohal made his first-class debut for Punjab against Hyderabad at Mohali in December 2005. He represented the India Under 19 side and, although less prolific in limited overs cricket, also played in the IPL for Deccan Chargers and Kings XI Punjab.

In January 2018, he was named in the United States squad for the 2017–18 Regional Super50 tournament in the West Indies. In August 2018, he was named in the United States' squad for the 2018–19 ICC World Twenty20 Americas Qualifier tournament in Morrisville, North Carolina. In October 2018, he was named in the United States' squads for the 2018–19 Regional Super50 tournament in the West Indies and for the 2018 ICC World Cricket League Division Three tournament in Oman. However, he was ruled out of the latter due to injury.

In June 2019, he was selected to play for the Winnipeg Hawks franchise team in the 2019 Global T20 Canada tournament.

He made his Twenty20 International (T20I) debut for the United States against Bermuda on 22 August 2019.

In July 2020, he was named in the St Kitts & Nevis Patriots squad for the 2020 Caribbean Premier League. In June 2021, he was selected to take part in the Minor League Cricket tournament in the United States following the players' draft.
