= Paul Valthaty =

Indian cricketer (born 1983)

Personal information
- Full name: Paul Chandrashekar Valthaty
- Born: 7 December 1983 (age 42); Borivali, Mumbai, Maharashtra, India
- Height: 5 ft 8 in (1.73 m)
- Batting: Right-handed
- Bowling: Right-arm offbreak
- Role: Batsman

Domestic team information
- Years: Team
- 2002: India Under-19 national team
- 2009: Rajasthan Royals
- 2011–2013: Kings XI Punjab
- 2018: Mumbai South Central
- 2019: Air India

Career statistics
Competition	FC	LA	T20
Matches	5	4	34
Runs scored	120	74	778
Batting average	20.00	53.00	23.57
100s/50s	0/1	0/0	1/3
Top score	56	36	120*
Balls bowled	192	66	247
Wickets	1	1	11
Bowling average	70.00	–	31.09
5 wickets in innings	0	0	0
10 wickets in match	0	–	0
Best bowling	1/31	1/13	4/29
Catches/stumpings	1/–	1/–	6/–
- Source: ESPNcricinfo, 5 December 2021

Paul Chandrashekar Valthaty (born 7 December 1983) is a former Indian cricketer who played for Kings XI Punjab and Rajasthan Royals in the Indian Premier League and for India in the 2002 ICC Under 19 Cricket World Cup. He had to retire from the sport after he suffered an eye injury. He is known for his knock of 120 runs in 63 balls against Chennai Super Kings.

On 18 June 2023, Valthaty announced his retirement from first-class cricket.

== Early years and personal life ==
Valthaty was born and raised in the Mumbai suburb of Borivali. His family originally hails from the town of Nandyal, Andhra Pradesh.

Valthaty was trained in the Dilip Vengsarkar academy in Mumbai. He was then recommended by Vengsarkar to the Andhra Cricket Association (ACA) president Mr. Chamundeswarnath.

== Career ==
=== Early domestic career ===
Valthaty had a nondescript career until pre 2002, after making his way up the age groups of Mumbai Cricket during the late 1990s. He made India's Under-19 squad for the 2002 World Cup in New Zealand with the likes of Irfan Pathan and Parthiv Patel. It was here where an injury to his eye in the game against Bangladesh halted his development. He wouldn't break through into senior level cricket for almost seven years, and got just one opportunity for Mumbai, playing a single day for them in 2006. He wouldn't sign for a major team until 2009, when Rajasthan Royals signed him, and he played some matches for the side. His performances earned him a place in Mumbai's Twenty20 side, and he played some great matches for them, which led to him signing for Kings XI Punjab in 2011.

=== Indian Premier League ===
Paul Valthaty was selected by Kings XI Punjab as a backup player for the more expensive international buys at a player auction in January 2011. He was the opening batsman for Kings XI Punjab, and would have an outstanding game in the 2011 Indian Premier League against reigning champions Chennai Super Kings. Valthaty helped the Kings XI Punjab chase down a 189-run target with six wickets and five balls to spare at Mohali. He scored 120 runs, being the first hundred of IPL 2011 season and 13th overall in the 21st century. It remains the 11th highest IPL score ever, after Chris Gayle's 175* & 128, Brendon McCullum's 158*, AB de Villiers's 133*,129*,Quinton de Kock's 140*, K. L. Rahul's 132*, Murali Vijay's 127, Rishabh Pant's 128* and Virender Sehwag's 122. It is also the highest individual score by a batsman in IPL history at the Inderjit Singh Bindra Stadium. In his next game he scored 75 from 47 deliveries, hitting 5 sixes and 8 fours after achieving the best bowling figures for any Kings XI Punjab bowler with 4 for 29. His great performance resulted in success for the Kings XI, and they won the match. He played in the next match, and scored 46 from only 31 deliveries with three classic sixes. With his initial blitzkrieg, the team crossed the fifty in just three overs, a record in IPL history which would later be broken by the Royal Challengers Bangalore in their second match against the Kochi Tuskers Kerala in the same season. He was retained by Kings Xi Punjab for the following two seasons, however, he didn't perform as well, and slowly faded away from the scene.

=== Coaching career ===
Now he is running a cricket academy named as Home Ground Cricket Academy in Thakur Village, Kandivali East, Mumbai. Valthaty was appointed as coach of the Seattle Thunderbolts in August 2024.

== Career with Air India ==
Following his departure from IPL stardom, he began to play for his then-employers Air India. He was given the job on a sports quota, and was only required to practice and play games after agreeing the terms with his employers.

=== Mumbai T20 League ===
In March 2018, Mumbai South Central acquired Paul Valthaty for ₹50,000, in the six-franchise Mumbai T20 League. He was placed under the Developmental Players bracket and therefore was only entitled to receive the minimum salary.
