= 2011 Mumbai Indians season =

Indian Premier League cricket team season

Mumbai Indians
2011 season
- Coach: Robin Singh
- Captain: Sachin Tendulkar (IPL); Harbhajan Singh (CLT20)
- IPL: Playoffs
- CLT20: Champions

Mumbai Indians (MI) are a franchise cricket team based in Mumbai, India, which plays in the Indian Premier League (IPL). They were one of the ten teams that took part in the 2011 Indian Premier League. They were captained by Sachin Tendulkar for the fourth season in succession.

Mumbai Indians reached the Qualifier of playoff stage in the 2011 IPL where they were defeated by the Royal Challengers Bangalore. They qualified for the 2011 Champions League Twenty20, where they emerged as champions.

== Indian Premier League ==
=== Squad ===
| Name | Nationality | Birth date | Batting style | Bowling style | Notes |
Batsmen
| Sachin Tendulkar | India | 24 April 1973 (aged 37) | Right-handed | Right-arm leg break | Captain |
| Rohit Sharma | India | 30 April 1987 (aged 23) | Right-handed | Right-arm off break | |
| Aiden Blizzard | Australia | 27 June 1984 (aged 26) | Left-handed | Left-arm medium-fast | Overseas |
| Tirumalasetti Suman | India | 15 December 1983 (aged 27) | Right-handed | Right-arm off break | |
| Suryakumar Yadav | India | 14 September 1990 (aged 20) | Right-handed | Right-arm off break | |
| Sarul Kanwar | India | 8 November 1987 (aged 23) | Right-handed | Right-arm off break | |
All-rounders
| Andrew Symonds | Australia | 9 June 1975 (aged 35) | Right-handed | Right-arm off break | Overseas |
| Kieron Pollard | Trinidad and Tobago | 12 May 1987 (aged 23) | Right-handed | Right-arm medium | Overseas |
| James Franklin | New Zealand | 7 November 1980 (aged 30) | Left-handed | Left-arm medium | Overseas |
| Moises Henriques | Australia | 1 February 1987 (aged 24) | Right-handed | Right-arm medium | Overseas |
| Rajagopal Sathish | India | 14 January 1981 (aged 30) | Right-handed | Right-arm medium | |
Wicket-keepers
| Aditya Tare | India | 3 November 1987 (aged 23) | Right-handed | – | |
| Ambati Rayudu | India | 23 September 1985 (aged 25) | Right-handed | – | |
| Davy Jacobs | South Africa | 4 November 1982 (aged 28) | Right-handed | – | Overseas |
Bowlers
| Harbhajan Singh | India | 3 July 1980 (aged 30) | Right-handed | Right-arm off break | Vice-Captain |
| Dilhara Fernando | Sri Lanka | 19 July 1979 (aged 31) | Right-handed | Right arm medium-fast | Overseas |
| Clint McKay | Australia | 20 February 1983 (aged 28) | Right-handed | Right arm medium-fast | Overseas |
| Dhawal Kulkarni | India | 10 December 1988 (aged 22) | Right-handed | Right-arm medium-fast | |
| Munaf Patel | India | 12 July 1983 (aged 27) | Right-handed | Right-arm fast-medium | |
| Lasith Malinga | Sri Lanka | 28 August 1983 (aged 27) | Right-handed | Right-arm fast | Overseas |
| Ali Murtaza | India | 1 January 1990 (aged 21) | Left-handed | Slow Left-arm orthodox | |
| Pawan Suyal | India | 15 October 1989 (aged 21) | Right-handed | Left-arm medium | |
| Ray Price | Zimbabwe | 15 October 1976 (aged 34) | Right-handed | Left-arm Slow left arm orthodox | Overseas |
| Abu Nechim | India | 5 November 1988 (aged 22) | Right-handed | Right-arm fast-medium | |
| Yuzvendra Chahal | India | 23 July 1990 (aged 20) | Right-handed | Right-arm leg break | |

=== Match log ===
| No. | Date | Opponent | Venue | Result | Scorecard |
|---|---|---|---|---|---|
| 1 | April 10 | Delhi Daredevils | Delhi | Won by 8 wickets; MoM – Lasith Malinga 5/13 (3.4 overs) | ESPNcricinfo |
| 2 | April 12 | Royal Challengers Bangalore | Bangalore | Won by 9 wickets; MoM – Sachin Tendulkar 55* (46) | ESPNcricinfo |
| 3 | April 15 | Kochi Tuskers Kerala | Mumbai | Lost by 8 wickets | ESPNcricinfo |
| 4 | April 20 | Pune Warriors India | Mumbai | Won by 7 wickets; MoM – Munaf Patel 3/8 (2.2 overs) | ESPNcricinfo |
| 5 | April 22 | Chennai Super Kings | Mumbai | Won by 8 runs; MoM – Harbhajan Singh 5/18 (4 overs) | ESPNcricinfo |
| 6 | April 24 | Deccan Chargers | Hyderabad | Won by 37 runs; MoM – Lasith Malinga 3/9 (4 overs) | ESPNcricinfo |
| 7 | April 29 | Rajasthan Royals | Jaipur | Lost by 7 wickets | ESPNcricinfo |
| 8 | May 2 | Kings XI Punjab | Mumbai | Won by 23 runs; MoM – Kieron Pollard 20 (11), 1/18 (3 overs) and 2 catches | ESPNcricinfo |
| 9 | May 4 | Pune Warriors India | Mumbai | Won by 21 runs | ESPNcricinfo |
| 10 | May 7 | Delhi Daredevils | Mumbai | Won by 32 runs; MoM – Ambati Rayudu 59 (39), 1 catch and 1 runout | ESPNcricinfo |
| 11 | May 10 | Kings XI Punjab | Mohali | Lost by 76 runs | ESPNcricinfo |
| 12 | May 14 | Deccan Chargers | Mumbai | Lost by 10 runs | ESPNcricinfo |
| 13 | May 20 | Rajasthan Royals | Mumbai | Lost by 10 wickets | ESPNcricinfo |
| 14 | May 22 | Kolkata Knight Riders | Kolkata | Won by 7 wickets; MoM – James Franklin 45 (23) and 2/35 (4 overs) | ESPNcricinfo |
Eliminator
| 15 | May 25 | Kolkata Knight Riders | Mumbai | Won by 4 wickets; MoM – Munaf Patel 3/27 (4 overs) | ESPNcricinfo |
Qualifier 2
| 16 | May 27 | Royal Challengers Bangalore | Chennai | Lost by 43 runs | ESPNcricinfo |
Overall record: 10–6. Advanced to the playoffs.

== Champions League Twenty20 ==
=== Match log ===
| No. | Date | Opponent | Venue | Result | Scorecard |
|---|---|---|---|---|---|
| 1 | September 24 | Chennai Super Kings | Chennai | Won by 3 wickets; MoM Lasith Malinga 37* (24) and 1/29 | ESPNcricinfo |
| 2 | September 26 | Trinidad and Tobago | Bengaluru | Won by 1 wicket | ESPNcricinfo |
| 3 | September 30 | Cape Cobras | Bengaluru | Match did not start after intermittent rain | ESPNcricinfo |
| 4 | October 2 | New South Wales | Chennai | Lost by 5 wickets | ESPNcricinfo |
Semifinal
| 5 | October 8 | Somerset | Chennai | Won by 10 runs; MoM Lasith Malinga 4/20 | ESPNcricinfo |
Final
| 6 | October 9 | Royal Challengers Bangalore | Chennai | Won by 31 runs; MoM – Harbhajan Singh 3/20 and 2 catches | ESPNcricinfo |
Overall record: 4–1. Champions
