= Kochi Tuskers Kerala =

Defunct Kochi-based cricket franchise in the Indian Premier League (2011)

- League: Indian Premier League

Personnel
- Captain: Mahela Jayawardene
- Coach: Geoff Lawson
- Owner: Rendezvous Sports World

Team information
- City: Kochi, Kerala, India
- Founded: 2011; 15 years ago
- Home ground: Jawaharlal Nehru International Stadium, Kochi
- Capacity: 40000
- Secondary home ground(s): Holkar Cricket Stadium, Indore
- Secondary ground capacity: 30000

Kochi Tuskers Kerala was a franchise cricket team that played in the Indian Premier League (IPL) representing the city of Kochi, Kerala, India. The team was one of two new franchises added to the IPL for the 2011 season, alongside Pune Warriors India. The team franchise was owned by Kochi Cricket Pvt Ltd., which was a consortium of multiple companies.

== Franchise history ==
The auction for expanding the initial eight franchises for the Indian Premier League was held on 22 March 2010. The cities involved were Pune, Ahmedabad, Kochi, Nagpur, Kanpur, Dharamsala, Visakhapatnam, Rajkot, Cuttack, Vadodara, Indore and Gwalior. Two new teams were selected out of 12 cities. Sahara Group made the highest bid in the auction and chose to base its team in Pune, at the cost of US$370m (₹1702 crore). Rendezvous Sports World made the second highest bid of US$333.2m (₹1533 crores), and elected to base its team in Kochi. The two new franchises were sold for a combined sum greater than the combined purchase price of the original eight franchises.

=== Team name and home ground issues ===
The franchise initially announced that the name of the team would be "Indi Commandos". This led to negative responses worldwide. The franchise management suggested that a move to Ahmedabad was possible, moving the team away from Kochi, due in part to a comparatively high entertainment tax in Kerala (36%). This invoked a mass response on social networks, particularly on Facebook, forcing management to change the team name and logo. A poll on the franchise's official website eventually determined the team name. The decision to move the home ground was dropped when the Corporation of Kochi waived 50% of the entertainment tax levee.

=== Termination from the IPL ===
Due to a dispute amongst the team owners, the franchise failed to pay the 10% bank guarantee element of the franchise fee which was supposed to be paid before the 2011 season began. The BCCI claimed that it had sent several requests for payment to the franchise owners but received no response. On 19 September 2011, then BCCI president N. Srinivasan announced that the franchise was being terminated because it had failed to provide the bank guarantee. On 14 October 2011, the IPL Governing Council announced that there would be only nine teams participating in 2012 after the Kochi franchise was expelled. The players from the team were auctioned to other franchises in the 2012 IPL player auction. Players who attracted no bids had their salaries covered via the team's bank guarantee from the previous season.

On 13 January 2012, the BCCI asked overseas players who had signed a contract with the franchise to sue the owners, with the BCCI included as a party to each case.

In February 2012, Rendezvous Sports World announced that it would take the BCCI to court over its termination from the IPL. In July 2015, a court-appointed arbitrator Justice Lahoti ordered the BCCI to pay ₹550 crore (US$59 million) as compensation for terminating the franchise agreement. ESPNcricinfo reported that the franchise owners had requested the BCCI to permit the team to return to the IPL, instead of the compensation awarded by the arbitrator. The original shareholding pattern of KTK was:

- Shailendra Gaikwad (Rendezvous Sports World) (26%)
- Vipul Shah (Parinee Developers) (26%)
- Mehul Shah, Chintan Vora (Anchor Earth) (27%)
- Kailash Singhal (Film Waves) (12%)
- Saket Mehta (Anand Shyam Estates and Developers Pvt Ltd) (8%)
- Vivek Venugopal, P T Keshav (Elite Group of Companies) (1%)

The franchise was at the centre of controversies from its inception. The BCCI had given the franchise an ultimatum to dissolve factionalism and infighting between its shareholders. After a series of lengthy meetings the company sent a letter to the BCCI requesting more time stating that the negotiations were in an advanced stage and they needed some more time to be sorted.

In October 2010, the BCCI announced that it would decide the fate of the Kochi team. The IPL Governing council gave the team a 30-day termination notice with the chance to resolve the issues and by December the ownership structure of the franchise was resolved.

The restructured shareholding pattern was:

- Mehul Shah, Chintan Vora (Anchor Earth) (31.45%)
- Vipul Shah (Parinee Developers) (30.27%)
- Kailash Singhal (Film Waves) (13.97%)
- Shailendra Gaikwad (Rendezvous Sports World) (10%)
- Saket Mehta (Anand Shyam Estates and Developers Pvt Ltd) (9.31%)
- Vivek Venugopal, P T Keshav (Elite Group of Companies) (5%)

== Team identity ==
The team's shirt colours were purple and orange with orange trousers.

External videos
- Signature song of Kochi Tuskers Kerala

The franchise's signature song was composed by veteran film score composer Ouseppachan. The music video for the song was filmed by Priyadarshan and his cinematographer Thiru. The song was shot at various locales including Paravur, Cherraai, Varapuzha backwaters and the Jawaharlal Nehru Stadium. It features almost all the leading players in the team as well as Malayalam movie actress Rima Kallingal.

== Seasons ==
=== Indian Premier League ===
| Year | League standing | Final standing |
|---|---|---|
| 2011 | 8th out of 10 | League stage |

=== Result summary ===
==== Overall ====
| Year | Home/Away | Matches | Wins | Loss | No Result | Win % |
|---|---|---|---|---|---|---|
| 2011 | Home | 7 | 3 | 4 | 0 | 42.86% |
| 2011 | Away | 7 | 3 | 4 | 0 | 42.86% |
| 2011 | Total | 14 | 6 | 8 | 0 | 42.86% |

==== By opposition ====
| Opposition | Span | Mat | Won | Lost | Tied | NR | Win % |
|---|---|---|---|---|---|---|---|
| Chennai Super Kings | 2011 | 2 | 1 | 1 | 0 | 0 | 50 |
| Deccan Chargers | 2011 | 1 | 0 | 1 | 0 | 0 | 0 |
| Delhi Daredevils | 2011 | 2 | 1 | 1 | 0 | 0 | 50 |
| Kings XI Punjab | 2011 | 1 | 0 | 1 | 0 | 0 | 0 |
| Kolkata Knight Riders | 2011 | 2 | 2 | 0 | 0 | 0 | 100 |
| Mumbai Indians | 2011 | 1 | 1 | 0 | 0 | 0 | 100 |
| Pune Warriors India | 2011 | 1 | 0 | 1 | 0 | 0 | 0 |
| Rajasthan Royals | 2011 | 2 | 1 | 1 | 0 | 0 | 50 |
| Royal Challengers Bengaluru | 2011 | 2 | 0 | 2 | 0 | 0 | 0 |

== Home grounds ==
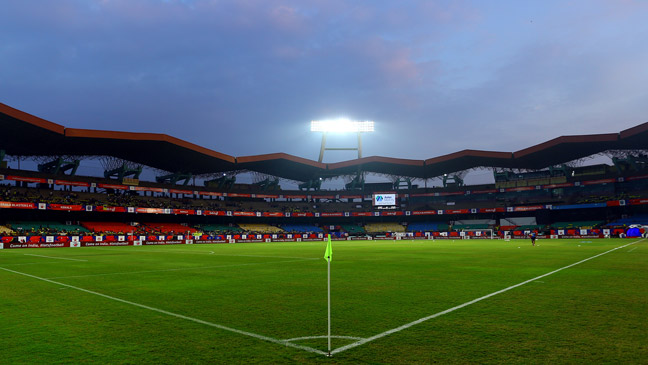
Jawaharlal Nehru Stadium (Kochi)

The two home grounds of the Kochi Tuskers Kerala were the Jawaharlal Nehru Stadium in Kochi and Holkar Cricket Stadium, Indore. Five homes matches were held at Kochi and two at Indore. The Greater Cochin Development Authority completely over-hauled the Jawaharlal Nehru Stadium to cater for hosting IPL matches.

== Kit manufacturers and sponsors ==
Federal Bank, a major Indian commercial bank in the private sector, with its headquarters in Aluva, Kerala, was the principal sponsor of Kochi Tuskers Kerala. Lotto, an Italian sports goods manufacturer, was the apparel sponsor, V-Guard, an electronics company, and AVT, a tea brand, were the associate sponsors with Elite Foods, Parinee Developers and Anchor Earth are the other main sponsors.

| Year | Kit manufacturer | Shirt sponsor (front) | Shirt sponsor (back) |
|---|---|---|---|
| 2011–2012 | Lotto | Anchor Toothpaste | Federal Bank |

== See also ==
- List of controversies involving the Indian Premier League
