= 2012 Indian Premier League spot-fixing case =

2012 in Indian cricket

The 2012 Indian Premier League spot-fixing case was a controversy which arose during the 2012 Indian Premier League and led to the banning of five cricketers. It started when a Hindi news channel, India TV, aired a sting operation which accused five players of seeking money in exchange for spot-fixing. Bans were imposed on all five, with a life-ban on Deccan Chargers's TP Sudhindra, a five-year ban on Kings XI Punjab's Shalabh Srivastava, and a one-year ban on Pune Warriors India's Mohnish Mishra and Kings XI Punjab's Amit Yadav. In addition Abhinav Bali, who was not in contact with any team during the 2012 season, was banned for a year. In the sting operation, Bali claimed to have spot-fixed during the 2009 season. According to the sting operation, some of the players revealed that they had received more money from the franchises' owners than agreed on in the players' auction; they said that this money was black money.

== Sting operation ==
The sting operation was performed by reporters of India TV Jamshed Khan and Sushant Pathak posing as representatives of various teams. The operation was started in May 2011 and lasted until April of the following year. According to the operation, Srivastava revealed that the money they received from the franchises was black money. According to India TV, he was ready to spot-fix; however, the conversation is only recorded in an audio tape. Bali, who was not in contact with any franchise, claimed to have been involved in spot-fixing during the 2009 season. Mishra claimed that his franchise, Pune Warriors India, gave him around ₹12 million (US$130,000) to ₹14 million (US$150,000). This was against the BCCI guidelines; being an uncapped player, Mishra could not receive more than ₹3 million (US$31,000). TP Sudhindra also bowled a no-ball in a domestic match on the wish of the reporter.

== Preliminary inquiry ==
The BCCI carried out a preliminary inquiry headed by Ravi Sawani, the ICC Anti-Corruption Unit's former chief and the head of the BCCI Anti-Corruption Unit, which awarded the given punishments.

== Sudhindra's ban revoked ==
T.P. Sudhindra’s lifetime ban was modified in February 2023. Sudhindra had filed a petition in the Chhattisgarh High Court in 2022, which subsequently directed the BCCI to re-examine the case. The BCCI Ombudsman Vineet Saran called the lifetime ban disproportionate for two primary reasons, one of which was that Sudhindra had not been provided any formal anti-corruption training. He allowed the ban to be reduced to the "period already undergone". This effectively lifted the ban from the date of order, allowing Sudhindra to return to cricket grounds.

== See also ==
- Controversies involving the Indian Premier League
- 2013 Indian Premier League spot-fixing case
- Indian Premier League Controversies
