= 2012 Indian Premier League =

Cricket tournament

- Dates: 4 April 2012 – 27 May 2012
- Administrator: Board of Control for Cricket in India
- Cricket format: Twenty20
- Tournament format(s): Double round-robin and playoffs
- Champions: Kolkata Knight Riders (1st title)
- Runners-up: Chennai Super Kings
- Participants: 9
- Matches: 76
- Player of the series: Sunil Narine (KKR)
- Most runs: Chris Gayle (RCB) (733)
- Most wickets: Morne Morkel (DD) (25)
- Official website: www.iplt20.com

The 2012 Indian Premier League season, abbreviated as IPL 5 or the IPL 2012 or the DLF IPL 2012 (owing to title sponsorship reasons), was the fifth season of the Indian Premier League, initiated by the Board of Control for Cricket in India (BCCI) in 2007 with the first season played in 2008. The tournament began on 4 April and ended on 27 May 2012. Kolkata Knight Riders were the winning team, beating defending champions Chennai Super Kings by five wickets in the final. This season the number of teams in the league went from ten to nine with the termination of Kochi Tuskers Kerala.

Despite a slow start, IPL 5 earned a higher cumulative viewership than any previous edition of the IPL. The cumulative reach for 74 IPL 5 matches was recorded at 163 million against 162 million for 73 matches in IPL 4, and the final match had a higher reach than any previous final. The IPL 2012 edition was the most competitive season of which produced many nail biting finishes. In the 2012 season, there were 19 matches which produced results in the last over, and a couple of them produced results in the last ball. There were also 6 matches in which team won by a margin of less than 10 runs. Near the end of the season, the season faced various hurdles including a spot fixing case, which allegedly included 5 players caught on a sting operation carried on by a local news channel.

The top four teams of the tournament (Kolkata Knight Riders, Chennai Super Kings, Delhi Daredevils and Mumbai Indians) represented India in the 2012 Champions League Twenty20. The Fair Play Award was won by Rajasthan Royals, while Kings XI Punjab batsman Mandeep Singh was named the tournament's "Rising Star" and Kolkata Knight Riders bowler Sunil Narine was Player of the Season. This along with 2009, 2016, and 2021 are the only editions where a team topping the table at the end of league stage did not appear in the final.

== Termination of Kochi ==
The IPL Committee terminated the Kochi Tuskers Kerala franchise after it breached the BCCI's terms of conditions. Under the terms of the agreement, each franchise has to submit a bank guarantee every year that covers the fee payable to the BCCI. The team, founded in 2010, was bought for ₹ 1,550 crore and the consortium has to pay a bank guarantee of ₹ 1.56 billion every year until 2020. Despite this, the Tuskers' former players participated in this season's competition after being included in the players auction on 4 February 2012.

On 13 January, the BCCI asked the international players of Kochi Tuskers Kerala to register the individual court cases against the owners of the Kochi IPL team with the BCCI included as a party to each case.

== Venues ==
Chennai	Mumbai	Pune	Kolkata
Chennai Super Kings	Mumbai Indians	Pune Warriors India	Kolkata Knight Riders
M. A. Chidambaram Stadium	Wankhede Stadium	Subrata Roy Sahara Stadium	Eden Gardens
Capacity: 70,000	Capacity: 45,000	Capacity: 55,000	Capacity: 1,00,000
Mohali	2012 Indian Premier League is located in India		Bangalore
Kings XI Punjab	2012 Indian Premier League is located in India		Royal Challengers Bangalore
PCA Stadium	2012 Indian Premier League is located in India		M. Chinnaswamy Stadium
Capacity: 30,000	2012 Indian Premier League is located in India		Capacity: 55,000
Hyderabad	2012 Indian Premier League is located in India		Delhi
Deccan Chargers	2012 Indian Premier League is located in India		Delhi Daredevils
Rajiv Gandhi International Cricket Stadium	2012 Indian Premier League is located in India		Feroz Shah Kotla
Capacity: 55,000	2012 Indian Premier League is located in India		Capacity: 48,000
Visakhapatnam	Jaipur	Cuttack	Dharamsala
Deccan Chargers	Rajasthan Royals	Deccan Chargers	Kings XI Punjab
ACA-VDCA Stadium	Sawai Mansingh Stadium	Barabati Stadium	HPCA Stadium
Capacity: 35,000	Capacity: 30,000	Capacity: 45,000	Capacity: 23,000

== Opening ceremony ==
2012 Indian Premier League opening ceremony
- Date: 19:30, 3 April 2012 (+05:30)
- Location: YMCA College of Physical Education, Chennai; 13°1′35.6″N 80°14′10.25″E
- Filmed by: SET Max

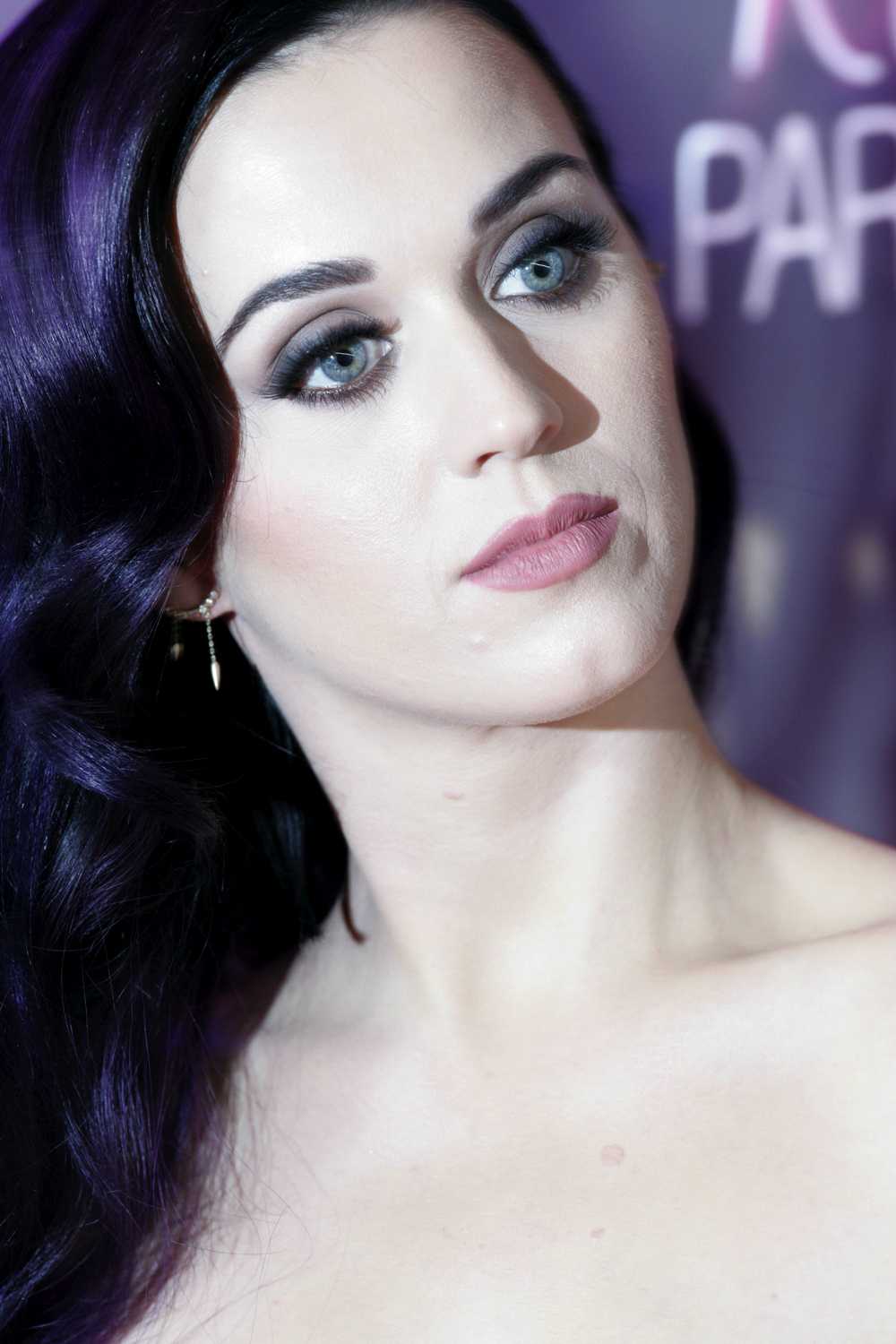
Katy Perry made her maiden performance in India at the ceremony.

The opening ceremony took place on the evening of 3 April 2012 in the YMCA College of Physical Education, Chennai. The ceremony was designed by Wizcraft Entertainment, and began at 19:30 IST, lasting almost two and half hours. The tickets for the ceremony were priced at ₹1,500 (US$16) and were available online at the official website of the IPL from 16 March 2012. Similar to the previous versions, the captains of the nine participating teams took the "MCC Spirit of Cricket" pledge. Various Bollywood actors, dancers, and musicians performed in the ceremony.

The event was planned to be held at M. A. Chidambaram Stadium, but was shifted to the YMCA College of Physical Education ground. The capacity of the YMCA college was lesser than that of the M. A. Chidambaram Stadium, and this caused disappointment. Tamil Nadu Cricket Association said that the decision was made because the opening match was to be played at the M. A. Chidambaram Stadium, and thus they cannot have opening ceremony in it due to risk of the cricket ground getting damaged by the performances. Sabbas Joseph, director of Wizcraft Entertainment, talking about the ceremony stated that, "There will be good things, lots of entertainment and cricket. It's the first time that such a large-scale, separate concert is being organised for the IPL, so big things have been planned."

The ceremony included some performances by Amitabh Bachchan, Priyanka Chopra, Kareena Kapoor, Salman Khan, Prabhu Deva, Colonial Cousins, and Katy Perry. The opening game was held in the M. A. Chidambaram Stadium, Chennai, the home venue of the reigning champions Chennai Super Kings. The closing ceremony was also held at the same venue. The ceremony started at 19:30 IST, however the gates were opened at 17:00 IST. A huge cut out poster of Salman Khan was kept at the YMCA ground prior to the ceremony. The ceremony was hosted by Amitabh Bachchan who had undergone two abdominal surgeries in February 2012. Earlier he had conveyed a message via Twitter saying, "April 3rd is the day for the opening. Preparing for it already. Getting back into the grind." Media reports suggested that Bachchan will be dancing, however Joseph said that this is unlikely to happen. He began the ceremony by reciting a poem, "If I were to be born again" by Prasoon Joshi. Later, the Colonial Cousins, along with South African band First Project and DJ Ravi Drums, performed in the ceremony. It was followed by Priyanka Chopra performing with cricketers like Harbhajan Singh on various songs from her films. Prabhu Deva also performed on songs from his films such as Wanted and Hum Se Hai Muqablah. After that, few members of the Chennai Super Kings' squad arrived on the stage, and Chopra joined them. Later Kareena Kapoor danced to songs from her films Ra.One and Agent Vinod. The performances of Chopra and Kapoor were choreographed by Shiamak Davar and his companions. After the dance performances, the captains of the nine teams took the "MCC Spirit of Cricket" pledge. Captain of the defending champions, M.S. Dhoni placed the trophy on the podium and it was followed by the chairman of IPL, Rajiv Shukla crediting the players, franchise owners, supporting staff and the spectators for the success of IPL. He then formally opened the 2012 IPL, saying, "It gives me a great pleasure to flag off the fifth edition of the DLF Indian Premier League, an arena where quality international and domestic cricketers take part in intense contest of strategy and skill. IPL is a platform where talent meets opportunity."

Salman Khan performed on songs from his films Ready, Bodyguard, Wanted, Partner and Jab Pyaar Kiya To Darna Kiya. American pop star Katy Perry closed the ceremony performing "Firework" and "California Gurls". The ceremony ended with fireworks.

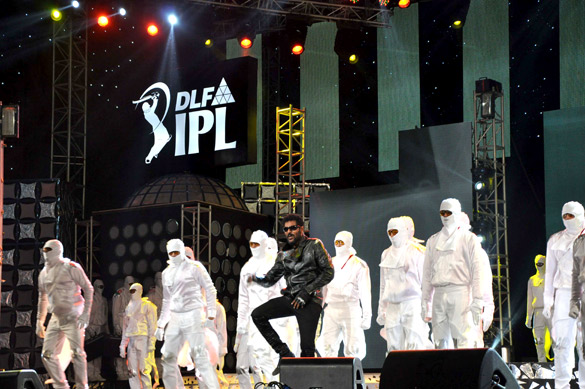
Prabhu Deva

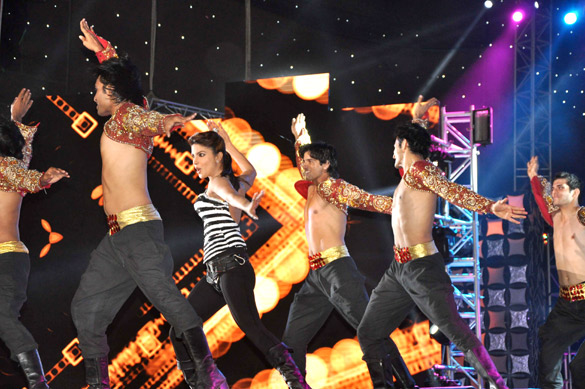
Priyanka Chopra

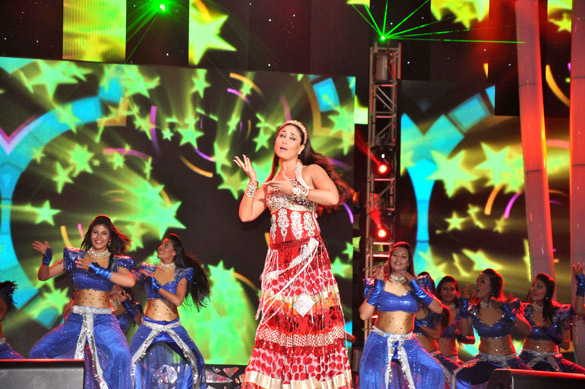
Kareena Kapoor

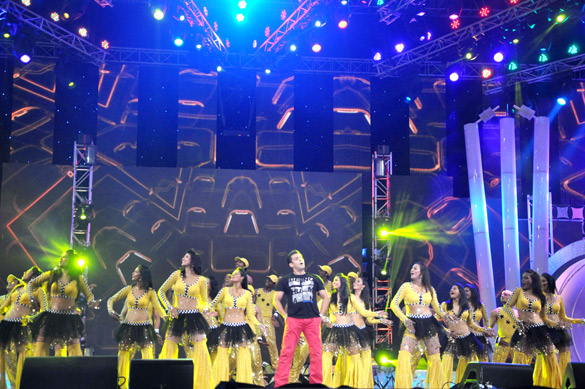
Salman Khan

Celebrities performing at the 5th IPL opening ceremony at Chennai

== Teams and standings ==
=== Points table ===
Pos	Team	Pld	W	L	NR	Pts	NRR
1	Delhi Daredevils (3rd)	16	11	5	0	22	0.617
2	Kolkata Knight Riders (C)	16	10	5	1	21	0.561
3	Mumbai Indians (4th)	16	10	6	0	20	−0.100
4	Chennai Super Kings (RU)	16	8	7	1	17	0.100
5	Royal Challengers Bangalore	16	8	7	1	17	−0.022
6	Kings XI Punjab	16	8	8	0	16	−0.216
7	Rajasthan Royals	16	7	9	0	14	0.201
8	Deccan Chargers	16	4	11	1	9	−0.509
9	Pune Warriors India	16	4	12	0	8	−0.551

- The top four teams qualified for the playoffs
- C refers to the eventual winners of the tournament, RU to the runners-up

== Results ==
=== Group stage ===
Visitor team →	CSK	DC	DD	KXIP	KKR	MI	PWI	RR	RCB
Home team ↓	CSK	DC	DD	KXIP	KKR	MI	PWI	RR	RCB
Chennai Super Kings		Chennai; 10 runs	Chennai; 9 wickets	Punjab; 7 runs	Kolkata; 5 wickets	Mumbai; 8 wickets	Chennai; 13 runs	Chennai; 7 wickets	Chennai; 5 wickets
Deccan Chargers	Chennai; 74 runs		Delhi; 9 wickets	Punjab; 25 runs	Kolkata; 5 wickets	Mumbai; 5 wickets	Deccan; 13 runs	Deccan; 5 wickets	Deccan; 9 runs
Delhi Daredevils	Delhi; 8 wickets	Delhi; 5 wickets		Delhi; 5 wickets	Kolkata; 6 wickets	Delhi; 37 runs	Pune; 20 runs	Delhi; 1 run	Bengaluru; 21 runs
Kings XI Punjab	Punjab; 6 wickets	Punjab; 4 wickets	Delhi; 6 wickets		Kolkata; 8 wickets	Mumbai; 4 wickets	Punjab; 7 wickets	Rajasthan; 43 runs	Bengaluru; 5 wickets
Kolkata Knight Riders	Chennai; 5 wickets	Match abandoned	Delhi; 8 wickets	Punjab; 2 runs		Mumbai; 27 runs	Kolkata; 7 runs	Kolkata; 5 wickets	Kolkata; 47 runs
Mumbai Indians	Mumbai; 2 wickets	Mumbai; 5 wickets	Delhi; 7 wickets	Punjab; 6 wickets	Kolkata; 32 runs		Pune; 28 runs	Mumbai; 27 runs	Bengaluru; 9 wickets
Pune Warriors India	Pune; 7 wickets	Deccan; 18 runs	Delhi; 8 wickets	Pune; 22 runs	Kolkata; 34 runs	Mumbai; 1 run		Rajasthan; 7 wickets	Bengaluru; 35 runs
Rajasthan Royals	Chennai; 4 wickets	Rajasthan; 5 wickets	Delhi; 6 wickets	Rajasthan; 31 runs	Rajasthan; 22 runs	Mumbai; 10 wickets	Rajasthan; 45 runs		Bengaluru; 46 runs
Royal Challengers Bengaluru	Match abandoned	Bengaluru; 5 wickets	Bengaluru; 20 runs	Punjab; 4 wickets	Kolkata; 42 runs	Mumbai; 5 wickets	Bengaluru; 6 wickets	Rajasthan; 59 runs	

Home team won	Visitor team won

- Note: Results listed are according to the home (horizontal) and visitor (vertical) teams.
- Note: Click on a result to see a summary of the match.

Team	Group matches																Playoffs			
Team	1	2	3	4	5	6	7	8	9	10	11	12	13	14	15	16	Q1	E	Q2	F
Chennai Super Kings	0	2	2	4	4	6	8	9	9	9	11	11	13	15	17	17		W	W	L
Deccan Chargers	0	0	0	0	0	1	3	3	5	5	5	5	5	5	7	9				
Delhi Daredevils	2	2	4	6	8	8	10	12	14	16	16	18	18	20	20	22	L		L	
Kings XI Punjab	0	0	2	4	4	4	6	6	8	10	10	12	14	14	16	16				
Kolkata Knight Riders	0	0	2	4	4	6	8	9	11	13	15	17	17	17	19	21	W			W
Mumbai Indians	2	2	4	6	6	6	8	8	10	12	14	14	16	18	18	20		L		
Pune Warriors India	2	4	4	6	6	6	8	8	8	8	8	8	8	8	8	8				
Rajasthan Royals	2	4	4	4	6	8	8	8	8	8	10	12	12	14	14	14				
Royal Challengers Bengaluru	2	2	2	2	4	6	8	9	9	9	11	13	15	15	17	17				

Win	Loss	No result

- Note: The total points at the end of each group match are listed.
- Note: Click on the points (group matches) or W/L (playoffs) to see the match summary.

== Group stage ==
4 April 2012
20:00 (D/N)
Scorecard

(H) Chennai Super Kings; 112 (19.5 overs)	v	Mumbai Indians; 115/2 (16.5 overs)
Suresh Raina 36 (26); Kieron Pollard 2/15 (4 overs)		Richard Levi 50 (35); Dwayne Bravo 1/14 (3 overs)

M. A. Chidambaram Stadium, Chennai
Player of the match: Richard Levi (Mumbai)

- Mumbai Indians won the toss and elected to field.

5 April 2012
20:00 (D/N)
Scorecard

(H) Kolkata Knight Riders; 97/9 (12 overs)	v	Delhi Daredevils; 100/2 (11.1 overs)
Laxmi Shukla 26 (17); Morné Morkel 3/18 (3 overs)		Irfan Pathan 42* (20); Rajat Bhatia 1/7 (1.1 overs)

Eden Gardens, Kolkata
Player of the match: Irfan Pathan (Delhi)

- Delhi Daredevils won the toss and elected to field.
- Rain-shortened match. Match started at 22:30 and reduced to 12 overs per side.

6 April 2012
16:00 (D/N)
Scorecard

Pune Warriors India; 129/9 (20 overs)	v	Mumbai Indians (H); 101/9 (20 overs)
Steve Smith 39 (32); Lasith Malinga 2/16 (4 overs)		Dinesh Karthik 32 (32); Ashok Dinda 4/17 (4 overs)

Wankhede Stadium, Mumbai
Player of the match: Steve Smith (Pune)

- Mumbai Indians won the toss and elected to field.

6 April 2012
20:00 (D/N)
Scorecard

(H) Rajasthan Royals; 191/4 (20 overs)	v	Kings XI Punjab; 160/9 (20 overs)
Ajinkya Rahane 98 (66); James Faulkner 2/41 (4 overs)		Mandeep Singh 34 (25); Kevon Cooper 3/25 (4 overs)

Sawai Mansingh Stadium, Jaipur
Player of the match: Ajinkya Rahane (Rajasthan)

- Kings XI Punjab won the toss and elected to field.

7 April 2012
16:00 (D/N)
Scorecard

(H) Royal Challengers Bangalore; 157/8 (20 overs)	v	Delhi Daredevils; 137/7 (20 overs)
AB de Villiers 64* (42); Doug Bracewell 3/32 (4 overs)		Naman Ojha 33 (26); Muttiah Muralitharan 4/25 (4 overs)

M. Chinnaswamy Stadium, Bangalore
Player of the match: AB de Villiers (Bangalore)

- Delhi Daredevils won the toss and elected to field.

7 April 2012
20:00 (D/N)
Scorecard

Chennai Super Kings; 193/6 (20 overs)	v	Deccan Chargers (H); 119 (17.1 overs)
Ravindra Jadeja 48 (29); Dale Steyn 2/25 (4 overs)		Cameron White 23 (16); Ravindra Jadeja 5/16 (4 overs)

ACA-VDCA Stadium, Visakhapatnam
Player of the match: Ravindra Jadeja (Chennai)

- Deccan Chargers won the toss and elected to field.

8 April 2012
16:00 (D/N)
Scorecard

(H) Rajasthan Royals; 164/5 (20 overs)	v	Kolkata Knight Riders; 142 (20 overs)
Brad Hodge 44 (29); Brett Lee 2/29 (4 overs)		Manoj Tiwary 59 (49); Kevon Cooper 3/28 (4 overs)

Sawai Mansingh Stadium, Jaipur
Player of the match: Brad Hodge (Rajasthan)

- Kolkata Knight Riders won the toss and elected to field.

8 April 2012
20:00 (D/N)
Scorecard

(H) Pune Warriors India; 166/6 (20 overs)	v	Kings XI Punjab; 144/8 (20 overs)
Marlon Samuels 46 (39); Harmeet Singh 3/24 (3.2 overs)		Bipul Sharma 35* (18); Rahul Sharma 2/34 (4 overs)

Subrata Roy Sahara Stadium, Pune
Player of the match: Marlon Samuels (Pune)

- Pune Warriors India won the toss and elected to bat.

9 April 2012
20:00 (D/N)
Scorecard

(H) Deccan Chargers; 138/9 (20 overs)	v	Mumbai Indians; 142/5 (20 overs)
Shikhar Dhawan 41 (24); Munaf Patel 4/20 (4 overs)		Rohit Sharma 73* (50); Dale Steyn 3/12 (4 overs)

ACA-VDCA Stadium, Visakhapatnam
Player of the match: Rohit Sharma (Mumbai)

- Deccan Chargers won the toss and elected to bat.

10 April 2012
16:00 (D/N)
Scorecard

Kolkata Knight Riders; 165/8 (20 overs)	v	Royal Challengers Bangalore (H); 123/9 (20 overs)
Gautam Gambhir 64 (39); Vinay Kumar 2/18 (4 overs)		Vinay Kumar 25 (26); Lakshmipathy Balaji 4/18 (4 overs)

M. Chinnaswamy Stadium, Bangalore
Player of the match: Lakshmipathy Balaji (Kolkata)

- Royal Challengers Bangalore won the toss and elected to field.

10 April 2012
20:00 (D/N)
Scorecard

Chennai Super Kings; 110/8 (20 overs)	v	Delhi Daredevils (H); 111/2 (13.2 overs)
Dwayne Bravo 22 (31); Morné Morkel 2/19 (4 overs)		Kevin Pietersen 43* (26); Ravichandran Ashwin 1/21 (3.2 overs)

Feroz Shah Kotla, Delhi
Player of the match: Morné Morkel (Delhi)

- Delhi Daredevils won the toss and elected to field.

11 April 2012
20:00 (D/N)
Scorecard

(H) Mumbai Indians; 197/6 (20 overs)	v	Rajasthan Royals; 170 (19.4 overs)
Kieron Pollard 64 (33); Amit Singh 2/29 (4 overs)		Owais Shah 76 (42); Munaf Patel 4/28 (3.4 overs)

Wankhede Stadium, Mumbai
Player of the match: Kieron Pollard (Mumbai)

- Rajasthan Royals won the toss and elected to field.

12 April 2012
16:00 (D/N)
Scorecard

Royal Challengers Bangalore; 205/8 (20 overs)	v	Chennai Super Kings (H); 208/5 (20 overs)
Chris Gayle 68 (35); Doug Bollinger 3/24 (3 overs)		Francois du Plessis 71 (46); Muttiah Muralitharan 3/21 (4 overs)

M. A. Chidambaram Stadium, Chennai
Player of the match: Francois du Plessis (Chennai)

- Royal Challengers Bangalore won the toss and elected to bat.

12 April 2012
20:00 (D/N)
Scorecard

Pune Warriors India; 115 (19 overs)	v	Kings XI Punjab (H); 116/3 (17.4 overs)
Mithun Manhas 31 (28); Dimitri Mascarenhas 5/25 (4 overs)		Shaun Marsh 64* (54); Rahul Sharma 1/17 (3 overs)

Punjab Cricket Association Stadium, Mohali, Chandigarh
Player of the match: Dimitri Mascarenhas (Kings)

- Kings XI Punjab won the toss and elected to field.

13 April 2012
20:00 (D/N)
Scorecard

Rajasthan Royals; 131/5 (20 overs)	v	Kolkata Knight Riders (H); 137/5 (19.2 overs)
Owais Shah 31 (33); Shakib Al Hasan 3/17 (4 overs)		Jacques Kallis 31 (38); Ashok Menaria 1/3 (1 over)

Eden Gardens, Kolkata
Player of the match: Shakib Al Hasan (Kolkata)

- Rajasthan Royals won the toss and elected to bat.

14 April 2012
20:00 (D/N)
Scorecard

Chennai Super Kings; 155/5 (20 overs)	v	Pune Warriors India (H); 156/3 (19.2 overs)
Ravindra Jadeja 44 (26); Rahul Sharma 2/16 (3 overs)		Jesse Ryder 73* (56); Yo Mahesh 1/22 (2.2 overs)

Subrata Roy Sahara Stadium, Pune
Player of the match: Jesse Ryder (Pune)

- Chennai Super Kings won the toss and elected to bat.

15 April 2012
16:00 (D/N)
Scorecard

Kings XI Punjab; 134/9 (20 overs)	v	Kolkata Knight Riders (H); 132/7 (20 overs)
Mandeep Singh 38 (34); Sunil Narine 5/19 (4 overs)		Debabrata Das 35* (23); Piyush Chawla 3/18 (4 overs)

Eden Gardens, Kolkata
Player of the match: Sunil Narine (Kolkata)

- Kolkata Knight Riders won the toss and elected to field.

15 April 2012
20:00 (D/N)
Scorecard

Rajasthan Royals; 195/2 (20 overs)	v	Royal Challengers Bangalore (H); 136 (20 overs)
Ajinkya Rahane 103* (60); Zaheer Khan 1/15 (4 overs)		Mayank Agarwal 34 (21); Siddharth Trivedi 4/23 (4 overs)

M. Chinnaswamy Stadium, Bangalore
Player of the match: Ajinkya Rahane (Rajasthan)

- Rajasthan Royals won the toss and elected to bat.
- Ajinkya Rahane smashed 6 consecutive fours off an S. Aravind over – which was a first for the IPL.

16 April 2012
20:00 (D/N)
Scorecard

(H) Mumbai Indians; 92 (19.2 overs)	v	Delhi Daredevils; 93/3 (14.5 overs)
Harbhajan Singh 33 (22); Umesh Yadav 2/11 (4 overs)		Virender Sehwag 32 (36); RP Singh 2/24 (4 overs)

Wankhede Stadium, Mumbai
Player of the match: Shahbaz Nadeem (Delhi)

- Delhi Daredevils won the toss and elected to field.

17 April 2012
16:00 (D/N)
Scorecard

Deccan Chargers; 196/2 (20 overs)	v	Rajasthan Royals (H); 197/5 (19.4 overs)
JP Duminy 58* (26); Siddharth Trivedi 1/27 (4 overs)		Brad Hodge 48* (21); Amit Mishra 3/32 (4 overs)

Sawai Mansingh Stadium, Jaipur
Player of the match: Brad Hodge (Rajasthan)

- Deccan Chargers won the toss and elected to bat.

17 April 2012
20:00 (D/N)
Scorecard

Pune Warriors India; 182/6 (20 overs)	v	Royal Challengers Bangalore (H); 186/4 (20 overs)
Robin Uthappa 69 (45); Vinay Kumar 2/34 (4 overs)		Chris Gayle 81 (48); Marlon Samuels 1/5 (2 overs)

M. Chinnaswamy Stadium, Bangalore
Player of the match: Chris Gayle (Bangalore)

- Pune Warriors India won the toss and elected to bat.
- Chris Gayle created the record for the most number of consecutive sixes during a match in IPL history where he hit Rahul Sharma for 5 consecutive sixes in a single over.

18 April 2012
20:00 (D/N)
Scorecard

(H) Kings XI Punjab; 124/7 (20 overs)	v	Kolkata Knight Riders; 127/2 (16.3 overs)
Adam Gilchrist 40* (33); Sunil Narine 2/24 (4 overs)		Gautam Gambhir 66* (44); Piyush Chawla 2/19 (4 overs)

Punjab Cricket Association Stadium, Mohali, Chandigarh
Player of the match: Gautam Gambhir (Kolkata)

- Kings XI Punjab won toss and elected to bat.

19 April 2012
16:00 (D/N)
Scorecard

Deccan Chargers; 157/8 (20 overs)	v	Delhi Daredevils (H); 162/5 (19.1 overs)
Parthiv Patel 45 (27); Morné Morkel 3/23 (4 overs)		Kevin Pietersen 103* (64); Dale Steyn 2/19 (4 overs)

Feroz Shah Kotla, Delhi
Player of the match: Kevin Pietersen (Delhi)

- Deccan Chargers won the toss and elected to bat.

19 April 2012
20:00 (D/N)
Scorecard

(H) Chennai Super Kings; 164/5 (20 overs)	v	Pune Warriors India; 151/7 (20 overs)
Francois du Plessis 58 (48); Marlon Samuels 3/39 (4 overs)		Angelo Mathews 27 (22); Nuwan Kulasekara 2/10 (2 overs)

M. A. Chidambaram Stadium, Chennai
Player of the match: Nuwan Kulasekara (Chennai)

- Pune Warriors India won the toss and elected to field.

20 April 2012
20:00 (D/N)
Scorecard

(H) Kings XI Punjab; 163/6 (20 overs)	v	Royal Challengers Bangalore; 166/5 (19.3 overs)
David Hussey 41 (34); Khan, McDonald 2/25 (4 overs) each		Chris Gayle 87 (56); Parvinder Awana 4/34 (4 overs)

Punjab Cricket Association Stadium, Mohali, Chandigarh
Player of the match: Chris Gayle (Bangalore)

- Royal Challengers Bangalore won the toss and elected to field.

21 April 2012
16:00 (D/N)
Scorecard

Rajasthan Royals; 146/4 (20 overs)	v	Chennai Super Kings (H); 147/3 (20 overs)
Owais Shah 52 (43); Shadab Jakati 1/12 (2 overs)		Francois du Plessis 73 (52); Kevon Cooper 2/23 (4 overs)

M. A. Chidambaram Stadium, Chennai
Player of the match: Francois du Plessis (Chennai)

- Rajasthan Royals won the toss and elected to bat.

21 April 2012
20:00 (D/N)
Scorecard

Pune Warriors India; 192/3 (20 overs)	v	Delhi Daredevils (H); 172/7 (20 overs)
Jesse Ryder 86 (58); Morné Morkel 3/50 (4 overs)		Virender Sehwag 57 (32); Alfonso Thomas 3/22 (4 overs)

Feroz Shah Kotla, Delhi
Player of the match: Sourav Ganguly (Pune)

- Delhi Daredevils won the toss and elected to field.

22 April 2012
16:00 (D/N)
Scorecard

(H) Mumbai Indians; 163/6 (20 overs)	v	Kings XI Punjab; 164/4 (19.3 overs)
James Franklin 79 (51); Parvinder Awana 2/23 (4 overs)		Shaun Marsh 68* (40); Kieron Pollard 2/14 (4 overs)

Wankhede Stadium, Mumbai
Player of the match: Shaun Marsh (Kings)

- Mumbai Indians won the toss and elected to bat.

22 April 2012
20:00 (D/N)
Scorecard

(H) Deccan Chargers; 126/7 (20 overs)	v	Kolkata Knight Riders; 127/5 (19 overs)
Shikhar Dhawan 50 (50); Lakshmipathy Balaji 2/22 (4 overs)		Manoj Tiwary 30* (28); Dale Steyn 2/24 (4 overs)

Barabati Stadium, Cuttack
Player of the match: Brett Lee (Kolkata)

- Kolkata Knight Riders won the toss and elected to field.
- The match had a delayed start, but was not shortened.

23 April 2012
20:00 (D/N)
Scorecard

Royal Challengers Bangalore; 189/3 (20 overs)	v	Rajasthan Royals (H); 143/7 (20 overs)
Tillakaratne Dilshan 76* (58); Brad Hogg 2/39 (4 overs)		Rahul Dravid 58 (42); KP Appanna 4/19 (4 overs)

Sawai Mansingh Stadium, Jaipur
Player of the match: AB de Villiers (Bangalore)

- Rajasthan Royals won the toss and elected to field.
- The Man of the Match award was originally given to AB de Villiers, who then presented it to KP Appanna.

24 April 2012
16:00 (D/N)
Scorecard

(H) Pune Warriors India; 146/2 (20 overs)	v	Delhi Daredevils; 148/2 (16 overs)
Manish Pandey 80* (56); Irfan Pathan 1/23 (4 overs)		Virender Sehwag 87* (48); Rahul Sharma 1/33 (4 overs)

Subrata Roy Sahara Stadium, Pune
Player of the match: Virender Sehwag (Delhi)

- Pune Warriors India won the toss and elected to bat.

24 April 2012
20:00 (D/N)
Scorecard

(H) Kolkata Knight Riders	v	Deccan Chargers

Eden Gardens, Kolkata

- Match abandoned without a toss due to rain.

25 April 2012
16:00 (D/N)
Scorecard

(H) Kings XI Punjab; 168/3 (20 overs)	v	Mumbai Indians; 171/6 (19.5 overs)
David Hussey 68* (40); James Franklin 1/5 (1 over)		Rohit Sharma 50 (30); Parvinder Awana 3/39 (4 overs)

Punjab Cricket Association Stadium, Mohali, Chandigarh
Player of the match: Ambati Rayudu (Mumbai)

- Kings XI Punjab won the toss and elected to bat.

25 April 2012
20:00 (D/N)
Scorecard

Chennai Super Kings	v	Royal Challengers Bangalore (H)

M. Chinnaswamy Stadium, Bangalore

- Royal Challengers Bangalore won the toss and elected to field.
- Match abandoned without a ball bowled due to rain.

26 April 2012
20:00 (D/N)
Scorecard

Deccan Chargers; 177/4 (20 overs)	v	Pune Warriors India (H); 159/7 (20 overs)
Cameron White 78 (46); Bhuvneshwar Kumar 1/34 (4 overs)		Robin Uthappa 29 (27); Ashish Reddy 2/32 (4 overs)

Subrata Roy Sahara Stadium, Pune
Player of the match: Cameron White (Deccan)

- Deccan Chargers won the toss and elected to bat.

27 April 2012
20:00 (D/N)
Scorecard

(H) Delhi Daredevils; 207/5 (20 overs)	v	Mumbai Indians; 170/9 (20 overs)
Virender Sehwag 73 (39); Robin Peterson 3/37 (4 overs)		Ambati Rayudu 62 (39); Shahbaz Nadeem 2/35 (4 overs)

Feroz Shah Kotla, Delhi
Player of the match: Virender Sehwag (Delhi)

- Mumbai Indians won the toss and elected to field.

28 April 2012
16:00 (D/N)
Scorecard

Kings XI Punjab; 156/8 (20 overs)	v	Chennai Super Kings (H); 149/8 (20 overs)
Mandeep Singh 56 (50); Albie Morkel 3/29 (4 overs)		Dwayne Bravo 30 (21); Azhar Mahmood 3/25 (4 overs)

M. A. Chidambaram Stadium, Chennai
Player of the match: Mandeep Singh (Kings)

- Kings XI Punjab won the toss and elected to bat.

28 April 2012
20:00 (D/N)
Scorecard

(H) Kolkata Knight Riders; 190/4 (20 overs)	v	Royal Challengers Bangalore; 143/6 (20 overs)
Gautam Gambhir 93 (51); Vinay Kumar 2/31 (4 overs)		Chris Gayle 86 (58); Jacques Kallis 2/31 (4 overs)

Eden Gardens, Kolkata
Player of the match: Gautam Gambhir (Kolkata)

- Kolkata Knight Riders won the toss and elected to bat.

29 April 2012
16:00 (D/N)
Scorecard

(H) Delhi Daredevils; 152/6 (20 overs)	v	Rajasthan Royals; 151/3 (20 overs)
Virender Sehwag 63 (39); Pankaj Singh 2/25 (4 overs)		Ajinkya Rahane 84* (63); Morné Morkel 1/26 (4 overs)

Feroz Shah Kotla, Delhi
Player of the match: Virender Sehwag (Delhi)

- Delhi Daredevils won the toss and elected to bat.

29 April 2012
20:00 (D/N)
Scorecard

Deccan Chargers; 100 (18.4 overs)	v	Mumbai Indians (H); 101/5 (18.1 overs)
Shikhar Dhawan 29 (32); Lasith Malinga 4/16 (3.4 overs)		Rohit Sharma 42 (48); Dale Steyn 2/10 (4 overs)

Wankhede Stadium, Mumbai
Player of the match: Dale Steyn (Deccan)

- Mumbai Indians won the toss and elected to field.

30 April 2012
20:00 (D/N)
Scorecard

(H) Chennai Super Kings; 139/5 (20 overs)	v	Kolkata Knight Riders; 140/5 (19.4 overs)
Suresh Raina 44 (34); Jacques Kallis 2/21 (4 overs)		Gautam Gambhir 63 (52); Ravichandran Ashwin 2/22 (3.4 overs)

M. A. Chidambaram Stadium, Chennai
Player of the match: Gautam Gambhir (Kolkata)

- Chennai Super Kings won the toss and elected to bat.
- The Man of the Match award was originally given to Gautam Gambhir, who then presented it to Debabrata Das.

1 May 2012
16:00 (D/N)
Scorecard

(H) Deccan Chargers; 186/4 (20 overs)	v	Pune Warriors India; 173/5 (20 overs)
Kumar Sangakkara 82 (52); Wayne Parnell 1/25 (4 overs)		Steve Smith 47* (27); Ankit Sharma 1/9 (2 overs)

Barabati Stadium, Cuttack
Player of the match: Kumar Sangakkara (Deccan)

- Deccan Chargers won the toss and elected to bat.

1 May 2012
20:00 (D/N)
Scorecard

(H) Rajasthan Royals; 141/6 (20 overs)	v	Delhi Daredevils; 144/4 (15.2 overs)
Rahul Dravid 57 (43); Pawan Negi 4/18 (4 overs)		Virender Sehwag 73 (38); Brad Hogg 2/32 (4 overs)

Sawai Mansingh Stadium, Jaipur
Player of the match: Pawan Negi (Delhi)

- Rajasthan Royals won the toss and elected to bat.

2 May 2012
20:00 (D/N)
Scorecard

(H) Royal Challengers Bangalore; 158/5 (20 overs)	v	Kings XI Punjab; 163/6 (19.5 overs)
Chris Gayle 71 (42); Azhar Mahmood 3/20 (4 overs)		Nitin Saini 50 (36); Andrew McDonald 2/25 (4 overs)

M. Chinnaswamy Stadium, Bangalore
Player of the match: Azhar Mahmood (Kings)

- Kings XI Punjab won the toss and elected to field.

3 May 2012
20:00 (D/N)
Scorecard

Mumbai Indians; 120/9 (20 overs)	v	Pune Warriors India (H); 119/6 (20 overs)
Sachin Tendulkar 34 (35); Bhuvneshwar Kumar 2/9 (3 overs)		Mithun Manhas 42* (34); Harbhajan Singh 2/18 (4 overs)

Subrata Roy Sahara Stadium, Pune
Player of the match: Lasith Malinga (Mumbai)

- Mumbai Indians won the toss and elected to bat.

4 May 2012
20:00 (D/N)
Scorecard

(H) Chennai Super Kings; 160/6 (20 overs)	v	Deccan Chargers; 150/5 (20 overs)
Francois du Plessis 42 (35); Veer Pratap Singh 2/35 (3 overs)		Cameron White 77 (53); Suresh Raina 1/5 (1 over)

M. A. Chidambaram Stadium, Chennai
Player of the match: Suresh Raina (Chennai)

- Chennai Super Kings won the toss and elected to bat.

5 May 2012
16:00 (D/N)
Scorecard

(H) Kolkata Knight Riders; 150/5 (20 overs)	v	Pune Warriors India; 143/8 (20 overs)
Gautam Gambhir 56 (36); Angelo Mathews 2/17 (4 overs)		Sourav Ganguly 36 (35); Marchant de Lange 3/34 (4 overs)

Eden Gardens, Kolkata
Player of the match: Sunil Narine (Kolkata)

- Kolkata Knight Riders won the toss and elected to bat.

5 May 2012
20:00 (D/N)
Scorecard

Rajasthan Royals; 177/6 (20 overs)	v	Kings XI Punjab (H); 134/8 (20 overs)
Rahul Dravid 46 (39); Ryan Harris 4/34 (4 overs)		Shaun Marsh 34 (27); Shaun Tait 2/18 (4 overs)

Punjab Cricket Association Stadium, Mohali, Chandigarh
Player of the match: Shane Watson (Rajasthan)

- Rajasthan Royals won the toss and elected to bat.

6 May 2012
16:00 (D/N)
Scorecard

Chennai Super Kings; 173/8 (20 overs)	v	Mumbai Indians (H); 174/8 (20 overs)
Murali Vijay 41 (29); Lasith Malinga 3/25 (4 overs)		Sachin Tendulkar 74 (44); Ravindra Jadeja 2/12 (2 overs)

Wankhede Stadium, Mumbai
Player of the match: Dwayne Smith (Mumbai)

- Mumbai Indians won the toss and elected to field.

6 May 2012
20:00 (D/N)
Scorecard

Deccan Chargers; 181/2 (20 overs)	v	Royal Challengers Bangalore (H); 185/5 (18.5 overs)
Shikhar Dhawan 73* (52); Prasanth Parameswaran 1/45 (4 overs)		Tillakaratne Dilshan 71 (54); Amit Mishra 2/28 (4 overs)

M. Chinnaswamy Stadium, Bangalore
Player of the match: AB de Villiers (Bangalore)

- Royal Challengers Bangalore won the toss and elected to field.

7 May 2012
20:00 (D/N)
Scorecard

(H) Delhi Daredevils; 153/9 (20 overs)	v	Kolkata Knight Riders; 154/4 (18.4 overs)
Irfan Pathan 36 (22); Jacques Kallis 2/20 (4 overs)		Brendon McCullum 56 (44); Umesh Yadav 2/30 (4 overs)

Feroz Shah Kotla, Delhi
Player of the match: Jacques Kallis (Kolkata)

- Delhi Daredevils won the toss and elected to bat.

8 May 2012
16:00 (D/N)
Scorecard

(H) Pune Warriors India; 125/6 (20 overs)	v	Rajasthan Royals; 126/3 (16.2 overs)
Anustup Majumdar 30 (20); Shaun Tait 3/13 (4 overs)		Shane Watson 90* (51); Bhuvneshwar Kumar 1/17 (4 overs)

Subrata Roy Sahara Stadium, Pune
Player of the match: Shane Watson (Rajasthan)

- Pune Warriors India won the toss and elected to bat.

8 May 2012
20:00 (D/N)
Scorecard

Kings XI Punjab; 170/5 (20 overs)	v	Deccan Chargers (H); 145/8 (20 overs)
Mandeep Singh 75 (48); Ashish Reddy 2/39 (4 overs)		Daniel Harris 30 (29); David Hussey 2/2 (1 over)

Rajiv Gandhi International Cricket Stadium, Hyderabad
Player of the match: Mandeep Singh (Kings)

- Deccan Chargers won the toss and elected to field.
- Deccan Chargers were eliminated as a result of this match.

9 May 2012
20:00 (D/N)
Scorecard

(H) Mumbai Indians; 141/6 (20 overs)	v	Royal Challengers Bangalore; 142/1 (18 overs)
Dinesh Karthik 44 (39); H Patel, Muralitharan 2/24 (4 overs)		Chris Gayle 82* (59); Pragyan Ojha 1/25 (2 overs)

Wankhede Stadium, Mumbai
Player of the match: Chris Gayle (Bangalore)

- Royal Challengers Bangalore won the toss and elected to field.

10 May 2012
16:00 (D/N)
Scorecard

(H) Deccan Chargers; 187/4 (20 overs)	v	Delhi Daredevils; 193/1 (16.4 overs)
Shikhar Dhawan 84 (49); Varun Aaron 2/30 (4 overs)		David Warner 109* (54); Shikhar Dhawan 1/27 (2 overs)

Rajiv Gandhi International Cricket Stadium, Hyderabad
Player of the match: David Warner (Delhi)

- Deccan Chargers won the toss and elected to bat.

10 May 2012
20:00 (D/N)
Scorecard

(H) Rajasthan Royals; 126/6 (20 overs)	v	Chennai Super Kings; 127/6 (18.1 overs)
Brad Hodge 33 (28); Ben Hilfenhaus 2/8 (4 overs)		Suresh Raina 23 (17); Siddharth Trivedi 2/18 (4 overs)

Sawai Mansingh Stadium, Jaipur
Player of the match: Ben Hilfenhaus (Chennai)

- Chennai Super Kings won the toss and elected to field.
- Pune Warriors India were eliminated as a result of this match.

11 May 2012
20:00 (D/N)
Scorecard

Royal Challengers Bangalore; 173/3 (20 overs)	v	Pune Warriors India (H); 138/9 (20 overs)
Chris Gayle 57 (31); Angelo Mathews 1/14 (3 overs)		Robin Uthappa 38 (23); Vinay Kumar 3/32 (4 overs)

Subrata Roy Sahara Stadium, Pune
Player of the match: Chris Gayle (Bangalore)

- Pune Warriors India won the toss and elected to field.

12 May 2012
16:00 (D/N)
Scorecard

Mumbai Indians; 182/1 (20 overs)	v	Kolkata Knight Riders (H); 155/4 (20 overs)
Rohit Sharma 109* (60); Shakib Al Hasan 1/27 (4 overs)		Jacques Kallis 79 (60); Pragyan Ojha 1/26 (3 overs)

Eden Gardens, Kolkata
Player of the match: Rohit Sharma (Mumbai)

- Mumbai Indians won the toss and elected to bat.

12 May 2012
20:00 (D/N)
Scorecard

Delhi Daredevils; 114/5 (20 overs)	v	Chennai Super Kings (H); 115/1 (15.2 overs)
Yogesh Nagar 44* (47); Ben Hilfenhaus 3/27 (4 overs)		Murali Vijay 48* (40); Irfan Pathan 1/15 (2 overs)

M. A. Chidambaram Stadium, Chennai
Player of the match: Ben Hilfenhaus (Chennai)

- Chennai Super Kings won the toss and elected to field.

13 May 2012
16:00 (D/N)
Scorecard

(H) Rajasthan Royals; 170/4 (20 overs)	v	Pune Warriors India; 125/9 (20 overs)
Ajinkya Rahane 61 (47); Ashish Nehra 3/23 (4 overs)		Steve Smith 37 (31); Ajit Chandila 4/13 (4 overs)

Sawai Mansingh Stadium, Jaipur
Player of the match: Ajit Chandila (Rajasthan)

- Rajasthan Royals won the toss and elected to bat.
- Ajit Chandila (Rajasthan Royals) took a hat-trick.

13 May 2012
20:00 (D/N)
Scorecard

Deccan Chargers; 190/4 (20 overs)	v	Kings XI Punjab (H); 194/6 (20 overs)
Shikhar Dhawan 71 (50); Azhar Mahmood 2/39 (4 overs)		David Hussey 65* (35); Dale Steyn 2/26 (4 overs)

Punjab Cricket Association Stadium, Mohali, Chandigarh
Player of the match: David Hussey (Kings)

- Deccan Chargers won the toss and elected to bat.

14 May 2012
16:00 (D/N)
Scorecard

(H) Royal Challengers Bangalore; 171/6 (20 overs)	v	Mumbai Indians; 173/5 (19.4 overs)
Mayank Agarwal 64* (30); Kieron Pollard 1/20 (3 overs)		Ambati Rayudu 81* (54); Muttiah Muralitharan 1/16 (4 overs)

M. Chinnaswamy Stadium, Bangalore
Player of the match: Ambati Rayudu (Mumbai)

- Mumbai Indians won the toss and elected to field.
- The match started at 16:50 due to rain, but was not shortened. Also play was stopped for 8 minutes during Mumbai's chase as one of the light towers stopped working.

14 May 2012
20:00 (D/N)
Scorecard

(H) Kolkata Knight Riders; 158/6 (20 overs)	v	Chennai Super Kings; 160/5 (20 overs)
Gautam Gambhir 62 (43); Shadab Jakati 2/26 (4 overs)		Michael Hussey 56 (39); Sunil Narine 2/14 (4 overs)

Eden Gardens, Kolkata
Player of the match: Michael Hussey (Chennai)

- Chennai Super Kings won the toss and elected to field.

15 May 2012
20:00 (D/N)
Scorecard

Kings XI Punjab; 136/8 (20 overs)	v	Delhi Daredevils (H); 140/5 (19 overs)
David Hussey 40* (35); Umesh Yadav 3/21 (4 overs)		Mahela Jayawardene 56* (49); Parvinder Awana 3/22 (4 overs)

Feroz Shah Kotla, Delhi
Player of the match: Umesh Yadav (Delhi)

- Kings XI Punjab won the toss and elected to bat.
- Delhi Daredevils qualified for the playoffs as a result of this match.

16 May 2012
20:00 (D/N)
Scorecard

Kolkata Knight Riders; 140/7 (20 overs)	v	Mumbai Indians (H); 108 (19.1 overs)
Manoj Tiwary 41 (43); Rudra Pratap Singh 2/33 (4 overs)		Sachin Tendulkar 27 (24); Sunil Narine 4/15 (3.1 overs)

Wankhede Stadium, Mumbai
Player of the match: Sunil Narine (Kolkata)

- Mumbai Indians won the toss and elected to field.

17 May 2012
16:00 (D/N)
Scorecard

Chennai Super Kings; 120/7 (20 overs)	v	Kings XI Punjab (H); 123/4 (16.3 overs)
Dwayne Bravo 48 (43); Parvinder Awana 2/12 (4 overs)		Adam Gilchrist 64* (46); Dwayne Bravo 2/18 (3 overs)

HPCA Stadium, Dharamsala
Player of the match: Adam Gilchrist (Kings)

- Kings XI Punjab won the toss and elected to field.
- Kolkata Knight Riders qualified for the playoffs as a result of this match.

17 May 2012
20:00 (D/N)
Scorecard

Royal Challengers Bangalore; 215/1 (20 overs)	v	Delhi Daredevils (H); 194/9 (20 overs)
Chris Gayle 128* (62); Varun Aaron 1/38 (4 overs)		Ross Taylor 55 (26); Prasanth Parameswaran 3/30 (3 overs)

Feroz Shah Kotla, Delhi
Player of the match: Chris Gayle (Bangalore)

- Delhi Daredevils won the toss and elected to field.

18 May 2012
20:00 (D/N)
Scorecard

Rajasthan Royals; 126/8 (20 overs)	v	Deccan Chargers (H); 128/5 (18.4 overs)
Rahul Dravid 39 (36); Dale Steyn 2/16 (4 overs)		Akshath Reddy 42 (35); Siddharth Trivedi 2/20 (4 overs)

Rajiv Gandhi International Cricket Stadium, Hyderabad
Player of the match: Dale Steyn (Deccan)

- Rajasthan Royals won the toss and elected to bat.
- Rajasthan Royals were eliminated as a result of this match.

19 May 2012
16:00 (D/N)
Scorecard

(H) Kings XI Punjab; 141/8 (20 overs)	v	Delhi Daredevils; 145/4 (18.2 overs)
Siddharth Chitnis 38 (32); Morne Morkel 4/20 (4 overs)		David Warner 79 (44); Ryan Harris 2/19 (4 overs)

HPCA Stadium, Dharamsala
Player of the match: Umesh Yadav (Delhi)

- Delhi Daredevils won the toss and elected to field.
- Mumbai Indians qualified for the playoffs, Kings Xi Punjab were eliminated, and Delhi Daredevils advanced to Qualifier 1 as a result of this match.

19 May 2012
20:00 (D/N)
Scorecard

Kolkata Knight Riders; 136/4 (20 overs)	v	Pune Warriors India (H); 102/8 (20 overs)
Shakib Al Hasan 42 (30); Wayne Parnell 2/18 (4 overs)		Jesse Ryder 22 (24); Shakib Al Hasan 2/18 (4 overs)

Subrata Roy Sahara Stadium, Pune
Player of the match: Shakib Al Hasan (Kolkata)

- Kolkata Knight Riders won the toss and elected to bat.
- Kolkata Knight Riders advanced to Qualifier 1 as a result of this match.

20 May 2012
16:00 (D/N)
Scorecard

(H) Deccan Chargers; 132/7 (20 overs)	v	Royal Challengers Bangalore; 123/9 (20 overs)
JP Duminy 74 (53); Vinay Kumar 3/22 (4 overs)		Virat Kohli 42 (40); Dale Steyn 3/8 (4 overs)

Rajiv Gandhi International Cricket Stadium, Hyderabad
Player of the match: Dale Steyn (Deccan)

- Royal Challengers Bangalore won the toss and elected to field.
- Chennai Super Kings qualified for the playoffs, and Royal Challengers Bangalore were eliminated as a result of this match.

20 May 2012
20:00 (D/N)
Scorecard

(H) Rajasthan Royals; 162/6 (20 overs)	v	Mumbai Indians; 163/0 (18 overs)
Shane Watson 45 (36); Dhawal Kulkarni 3/18 (4 overs)		Dwayne Smith 87* (58); Shane Watson 0/17 (3 overs)

Sawai Mansingh Stadium, Jaipur
Player of the match: Dwayne Smith (Mumbai)

- Rajasthan Royals won the toss and elected to bat.

== Playoffs ==
On 15 March, it was announced that due to the municipal election in Delhi, the playoff schedule was being slightly altered. The sites of 22 and 23 May matches were changed, with Pune now hosting the first qualifier on 22 May and Bengaluru hosting the eliminator on 23 May. Had the Royal Challengers Bangalore qualified for the playoffs, they would play the match in Bengaluru, switching which venue hosts which match if necessary.

Qualifier 1 / Eliminator
22 May 2012 — Maharashtra Cricket Association Stadium, Pune
1	Delhi Daredevils	144/8 (20 ov)
2	Kolkata Knight Riders	162/4 (20 ov)
23 May 2012 — M. Chinnaswamy Stadium, Bengaluru
3	Mumbai Indians	149/9 (20 ov)
4	Chennai Super Kings	187/5 (20 ov)

Qualifier 2
25 May 2012 — M. A. Chidambaram Stadium, Chennai
Q1L	Delhi Daredevils	136 (17 ov)
EW	Chennai Super Kings	222/5 (20 ov)

Final
27 May 2012 — M. A. Chidambaram Stadium, Chennai
Q1W	Kolkata Knight Riders	192/5 (19.4 ov)
Q2W	Chennai Super Kings	190/3 (20 ov)

=== Qualifier 1 ===
22 May 2012
20:00 (D/N)
Scorecard

Kolkata Knight Riders; 162/4 (20 overs)	v	Delhi Daredevils; 144/8 (20 overs)
Yusuf Pathan 40* (21); Pawan Negi 1/18 (4 overs)		Mahela Jayawardene 40 (33); Sunil Narine, Jacques Kallis 2/24 (4 overs)

Maharashtra Cricket Association Stadium, Pune
Umpires: Billy Doctrove (WI) and Simon Taufel (Aus)
Player of the match: Yusuf Pathan (Kolkata)

- Kolkata Knight Riders won the toss and elected to bat.

=== Eliminator ===
23 May 2012
20:00 (D/N)
Scorecard

Chennai Super Kings; 187/5 (20 overs)	v	Mumbai Indians; 149/9 (20 overs)
Mahendra Singh Dhoni 51* (20); Dhawal Kulkarni 3/46 (4 overs)		Dwayne Smith 38 (22); Dwayne Bravo 2/10 (3 overs)

M. Chinnaswamy Stadium, Bangalore
Umpires: Billy Bowden (NZ) and Kumar Dharmasena (SL)
Player of the match: Mahendra Singh Dhoni (Chennai)

- Mumbai Indians won the toss and elected to field.
- Mahendra Singh Dhoni hit James Franklin for the tournament's biggest six, 112 metres.

=== Qualifier 2 ===
25 May 2012
20:00 (D/N)
Scorecard

Chennai Super Kings; 222/5 (20 overs)	v	Delhi Daredevils; 136 (17 overs)
Murali Vijay 113 (58); Varun Aaron 2/63 (4 overs)		Mahela Jayawardene 55 (38); Ravichandran Ashwin 3/23 (3.5 overs)

M. A. Chidambaram Stadium, Chennai
Umpires: Billy Doctrove (WI) and Simon Taufel (Aus)
Player of the match: Murali Vijay (Chennai)

- Delhi Daredevils won the toss and elected to field.

=== Final ===
27 May 2012
20:00 (D/N)
Scorecard

Chennai Super Kings; 190/3 (20 overs)	v	Kolkata Knight Riders; 192/5 (19.4 overs)
Suresh Raina 73 (38); Rajat Bhatia 1/23 (3 overs)		Manvinder Bisla 89 (48); Ben Hilfenhaus 2/25 (4 overs)

M. A. Chidambaram Stadium, Chennai
Umpires: Billy Bowden (NZ) and Simon Taufel (Aus)
Player of the match: Manvinder Bisla (Kolkata)

- Kolkata Knight Riders won the toss and elected to field.
- Kolkata Knight Riders won the IPL Trophy title for the first time.

== Statistics ==
Overall, 22,453 runs were scored at an average of 26.20. 857 wickets fell. Both the number of runs and of wickets were new IPL records. Six centuries were scored.

=== Most runs ===
Player	Team	Inns	Runs	HS
Chris Gayle	Royal Challengers Bangalore	14	733	128 not out
Gautam Gambhir	Kolkata Knight Riders	17	590	93
Shikhar Dhawan	Deccan Chargers	15	569	84
Ajinkya Rahane	Rajasthan Royals	16	560	103 not out
Virender Sehwag	Delhi Daredevils	15	494	87 not out

The leading run scorer of the league phase wore an orange cap while fielding.

=== Most wickets ===
Player	Team	Inns	Wkts	BBI
Morné Morkel	Delhi Daredevils	16	25	4/20
Sunil Narine	Kolkata Knight Riders	15	24	5/19
Lasith Malinga	Mumbai Indians	14	22	4/16
Umesh Yadav	Delhi Daredevils	17	19	3/19
Vinay Kumar	Royal Challengers Bangalore	14	19	3/22

The leading wicket taker of the league phase wore a purple cap while fielding.

=== Special awards ===
Player	Team	Award	Value
AB de Villiers	Royal Challengers Bangalore	Volkswagen Power Performance	Volkswagen Vento
Mandeep Singh	Kings XI Punjab	Citi Rising Star	Hero Honda Karizma ZMR and ₹ 10,00,000
David Hussey	Kings XI Punjab	King of Karbonn Kamaal Katches	₹ 10,00,000
Chris Gayle	Royal Challengers Bangalore	Orange Cap	₹ 10,00,000
Morné Morkel	Delhi Daredevils	Purple Cap	₹ 10,00,000
	Rajasthan Royals	Fairplay Award	–
Sunil Narine	Kolkata Knight Riders	Golden Player	₹ 10,00,000

== Reception and controversies ==
=== Initial viewership ===
The first matches of the season had recorded an average Television Viewership Rating (TVR) of 3.76, 18.7% less than the previous season. The viewership was also reportedly low for the opening ceremony with a rating of 1.3 TVR. The decline was attributed to the number of matches being played, as the count stands at 76 among 9 teams. The rating continued to fall as the cumulative number of people who tuned in to watch the first 16 games also declined from 127.40 million in 2011 to 122.44 million.

However, despite this slow start, IPL 5 garnered a higher cumulative viewership than any previous edition of the IPL. The cumulative reach for 74 IPL 5 matches was recorded at 163 million against 162 million for 73 matches in IPL 4, and the final match had a higher reach than any previous final.

=== Spot fixing ===
On 14 May 2012, an Indian news channel India TV aired a sting operation that accused five players involved in spot fixing. Reacting to the news, Chief manager of Indian Premier League Rajiv Shukla immediately suspended all five: Mohnish Mishra, Shalabh Srivastava, TP Sudhindra, Amit Yadav, and Abhinav Bali (none of whom had played international cricket). However, the report went on to claim that none of the cricketers were found guilty. On the reliability of the report, Rajat Sharma, the editor-in-chief of news channel India TV quoted that the channel had no doubts about the authenticity of the sting operation and prepared to go to court.

Mohnish Mishra who was part of Pune Warriors India team for the season, admitted to have said that franchises pay black money, in a sting operation. Mishra was caught on tape saying that franchisees paid them black money and that he had received ₹15 million (US$160,000) from the later, among which ₹12 million (US$120,000) was black money. He was also suspended from his team.

=== Other charges ===
- 9 April: Sharukh Khan, owner of the Kolkata Knight Riders, was served a notice by the Rajasthan Police for smoking in public. Khan was caught smoking on camera during a match between the Kolkata Knight Riders, the IPL team he owns, and the Rajasthan Royals on 8 April.
- 16 May: Shahrukh Khan, owner of the Kolkata Knight Riders, received a five-year ban from the Wankhede Stadium for arguing with security at the ground after a match.
- 18 May: Luke Pomersbach, a Royal Challengers Bangalore batsman, was arrested on charges of molesting an American woman. He was later granted interim bail.
- 20 May: Rahul Sharma and Wayne Parnell, Pune Warriors India players, were detained by Mumbai Police along with hundreds at a rave party bust.

== See also ==
- List of 2012 Indian Premier League personnel changes
- 2012 Champions League Twenty20
