= List of 2012 Indian Premier League personnel changes =

This is a list of all personnel changes for the 2012 Indian Premier League(IPL).

== Retirement ==
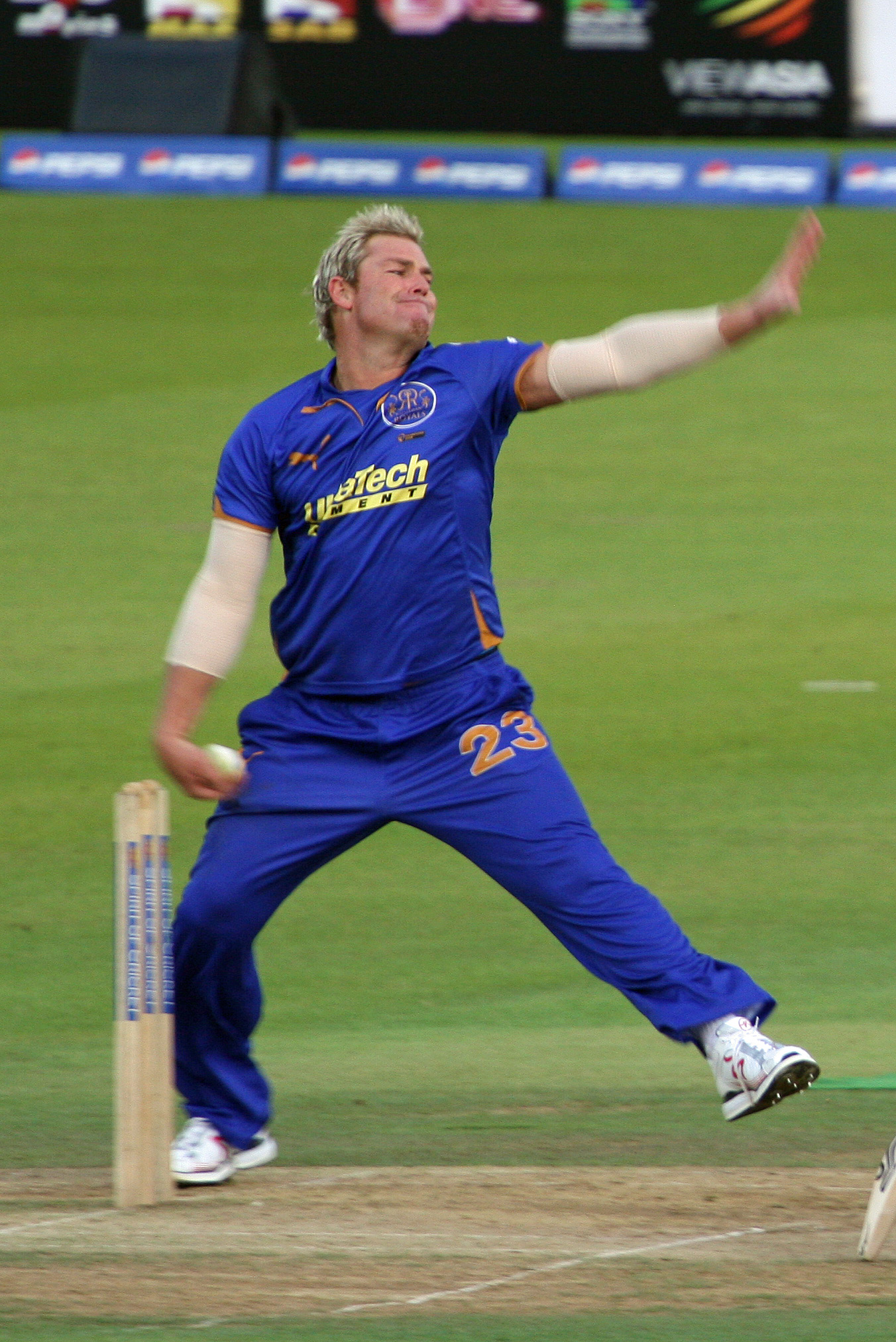
Shane Warne retired at age 41.

| Date | Name | Team(s) played (years) | Age | Notes | Ref. |
|---|---|---|---|---|---|
| 2011 | Sanath Jayasuriya | Mumbai Indians (2008–2010) | 41 | Did not return after being unsold in 2011 auction. | |
| 2011 | Makhaya Ntini | Chennai Super Kings (2008–2010) | 33 | Did not return after being unsold in 2011 auction. | |
| 20 May 2011 | Shane Warne | Rajasthan Royals (2008–2011) | 41 | | |
| 16 February 2012 | Andrew Symonds | Deccan Chargers (2008–2010); Mumbai Indians (2011) | 36 | | |

== Transfers ==
The first transfer window was between 15 December and 20 January 2012 and included the following transfers.

| Player | From | To | Seasons |
|---|---|---|---|
| Andrew McDonald | Delhi Daredevils | Royal Challengers Bangalore | 2012 |
| Kevin Pietersen | Deccan Chargers | Delhi Daredevils | 2012–13 |
| Dinesh Karthik | Kings XI Punjab | Mumbai Indians | 2012–13 |
| Harmeet Singh | Deccan Chargers | Kings XI Punjab | 2012 |
| Rajagopal Sathish | Mumbai Indians | Kings XI Punjab | 2012–13 |
| Pragyan Ojha | Deccan Chargers | Mumbai Indians | 2012–13 |
| Ashok Dinda | Delhi Daredevils | Pune Warriors India | 2012–13 |
| Shreevats Goswami | Kolkata Knight Riders | Rajasthan Royals | 2012–13 |
| Ross Taylor | Rajasthan Royals | Delhi Daredevils | 2012–13 |
| Abhishek Jhunjhunwala | Pune Warriors India | Deccan Chargers | 2012 |
| Ali Murtaza | Mumbai Indians | Pune Warriors India | 2012 |

== Withdrawn players ==
The following players withdrew from the tournament either due to injuries or because of other reasons.

| Player | Team |
|---|---|
| Darren Bravo | Deccan Chargers |
| Ishant Sharma | Deccan Chargers |
| Sreesanth | Rajasthan Royals |

=== Replacement signings ===
Players were signed as replacement of contracted players who were not available to play due to injuries and national commitments. Under IPL rules, the replacements have to be chosen from the pool of players who went unsold in the auction, and cannot be paid more than the players they are replacing, though they can be paid less.

| Player | Replaced | Team | Reason for replacement |
|---|---|---|---|
| Kyle Abbott | Rajagopal Sathish | Kings XI Punjab | Knee injury |
| Ben Cutting | Stuart Broad | Kings XI Punjab | Calf injury |
| Dwayne Smith | Mitchell Johnson | Mumbai Indians | Toe injury |
| Prasanth Parameswaran | Sreenath Aravind | Royal Challengers Bangalore | Knee injury |
| Gulam Bodi | Colin Ingram | Delhi Daredevils | Injury |
| Glenn Maxwell | Travis Birt | Delhi Daredevils | Injury |
| Tamim Iqbal | James Hopes | Pune Warriors India | Injury |
| Michael Clarke | Yuvraj Singh | Pune Warriors India | Cancer treatment |
| Marlon Samuels | Graeme Smith | Pune Warriors India | Ankle injury |
| Steve Smith | Mitchell Marsh | Pune Warriors India | Injury |
| Luke Wright | Tim Paine | Pune Warriors India | — |
| Richard Levi | Andrew Symonds | Mumbai Indians | Retirement |
| Owais Shah | Shane Warne | Rajasthan Royals | Retirement |

== Auction ==
The players auction for the 2012 Indian Premier League (fifth season) was held on 4 February 2012 in Bangalore. Each player in the auction pool had a base price under which franchise owners cannot bid. Players were allowed to set their base price between $20,000 to $400,000. The auction was telecast live on SET Max, the official broadcaster of IPL.

IPL authority increased the number of players in each squad to 33 from the previous limit of 30 and also increased the salary cap by $2 million. Each team can have a maximum of 11 overseas players in their squad and they can spend up to $2 million at auction.

The players of Kochi Tuskers Kerala were included in the players auction. Kochi was terminated by the BCCI in September 2011.

=== Sold players ===
The list of players sold at 2012 IPL player auction. Pune Warriors India did not take part.

| Player | Team | Base price | Winning bid |
|---|---|---|---|
| Brendon McCullum | Kolkata Knight Riders | $400,000 | $900,000 |
| Ravindra Jadeja | Chennai Super Kings | $100,000 | $2,000,000 |
| Muttiah Muralitharan | Royal Challengers Bangalore | $200,000 | $220,000 |
| Mahela Jayawardene | Delhi Daredevils | $300,000 | $1,400,000 |
| Herschelle Gibbs | Mumbai Indians | $50,000 | $50,000 |
| Brad Hodge | Rajasthan Royals | $200,000 | $475,000 |
| Parthiv Patel | Deccan Chargers | $200,000 | $650,000 |
| Dinesh Chandimal | Rajasthan Royals | $50,000 | $50,000 |
| Andre Russell | Delhi Daredevils | $50,000 | $450,000 |
| Mitchell Johnson | Mumbai Indians | $300,000 | $300,000 |
| R. P. Singh | Mumbai Indians | $200,000 | $600,000 |
| Vinay Kumar | Royal Challengers Bangalore | $100,000 | $1,000,000 |
| Sreesanth | Rajasthan Royals | $400,000 | $400,000 |
| Ramesh Powar | Kings XI Punjab | $100,000 | $160,000 |
| Brad Hogg | Rajasthan Royals | $100,000 | $180,000 |
| Sunil Narine | Kolkata Knight Riders | $50,000 | $700,000 |
| Robin Peterson | Mumbai Indians | $100,000 | $100,000 |
| Daniel Harris | Deccan Chargers | $50,000 | $70,000 |
| Kevon Cooper | Rajasthan Royals | $50,000 | $50,000 |
| James Faulkner | Kings XI Punjab | $100,000 | $190,000 |
| Azhar Mahmood | Kings XI Punjab | $100,000 | $200,000 |
| Thisara Perera | Mumbai Indians | $50,000 | $650,000 |
| Marchant de Lange | Kolkata Knight Riders | $50,000 | $50,000 |
| Darren Bravo | Deccan Chargers | $100,000 | $100,000 |
| Doug Bracewell | Delhi Daredevils | $50,000 | $50,000 |
