= Siddharth Trivedi =

Indian cricketer (born 1982)

Sidhharth Trivedi
Personal information
- Full name: Siddharth Kishorkumar Trivedi
- Born: 4 September 1982 (age 44); Ahmedabad, Gujarat
- Batting: Right-handed
- Bowling: Right-arm fast medium
- Role: Bowler

Domestic team information
- Years: Team
- 2008-2013: Rajasthan Royals

Career statistics
| Competition | FC | LA | T20 |
|---|---|---|---|
| Matches | 82 | 78 | 103 |
| Runs scored | 849 | 233 | 71 |
| Batting average | 11.02 | 7.28 | 5.91 |
| 100s/50s | 0/3 | 0/0 | 0/0 |
| Top score | 65 | 21* | 12 |
| Balls bowled | 15,142 | 3,732 | 2,103 |
| Wickets | 268 | 107 | 103 |
| Bowling average | 24.81 | 28.53 | 26.13 |
| 5 wickets in innings | 15 | 0 | 0 |
| 10 wickets in match | 1 | 0 | 0 |
| Best bowling | 6/32 | 4/40 | 4/25 |
| Catches/stumpings | 16/– | 17/– | 23/– |
- Source: ESPNcricinfo, 5 October 2012

Siddharth Kishorkumar Trivedi (born 4 September 1982) is an Indian cricketer who represented Gujarat. Currently, he plays for Saurashtra cricket team on his return to domestic circuit after serving a one-year ban for his failure to report being approached by bookies.

== Domestic career ==
Trivedi is right-handed batsman and a right-arm medium pace bowler. He made his first class debut in 2002–03. He played for West Zone in the Duleep Trophy, for Gujarat cricket team in the Ranji Trophy and for the Rajasthan Royals in the Indian Premier League. He returned to domestic in 2014 after completing ban of 1 year. He joined Saurashtra cricket team on his return to domestic circuit.

== Under 19 career ==
He played in the 2000 Under-19 Cricket World Cup for India. He has been called up to an Indian emerging players tour to Australia in July.

== Indian Premier League ==
In the Indian Premier League, he played for the Rajasthan Royals, who won the 2008 competition. Trivedi is Rajasthan's 3rd highest wicket taker in the IPL, with 65 wickets.

== Spot Fixing ==
The 2013 Indian Premier League spot-fixing and betting case had come when the Delhi Police arrested three cricketers, S. Sreeshanth, Ajit Chandila and Ankeet Chavan, on the charges of alleged spot-fixing on 16 May 2013. The three represented the Rajasthan Royals in the 2013 Indian Premier League.

During investigation, Ajit Chandila has reportedly told the Delhi Police that he had allegedly contacted his teammates Brad Hodge, Kevon Cooper and Siddharth Trivedi to be part of Booking loop. The Delhi Police interrogated Siddharth, who allegedly admitted taking 03 lakh from the Bookies but returned it after becoming scared of the consequences. The Police made Siddharth Trivedi a prosecution witness.

In 2013, Trivedi was banned for 1 year after he failed to report that bookies approached him and other alleged misconduct.
