= Kevon Cooper =

West Indian cricketer

Personal information
- Full name: Kevon Keston Cooper
- Born: 2 February 1989 (age 37); Trinidad, Trinidad and Tobago
- Height: 6 ft 7 in (201 cm)
- Batting: Right-handed
- Bowling: Right-arm medium
- Role: All-rounder
- Relatives: Kevin Molino (brother)

Domestic team information
- Years: Team
- 2008–2015: Trinidad and Tobago (squad no. 20)
- 2012–2013: Chittagong Kings
- 2012: Uthura Rudras
- 2012–2014: Rajasthan Royals
- 2013–2018: Trinbago Knight Riders
- 2015: Barisal Bulls
- 2016: Lahore Qalandars
- 2016: Khulna Titans
- 2017–2018: Leeward Islands
- 2017: Dhaka Dynamites
- FC debut: 9 March 2012 Trinidad and Tobago v Jamaica
- LA debut: 20 October 2011 Trinidad and Tobago v Combined Campuses and Colleges

Career statistics
Competition	FC	LA	T20
Matches	2	20	164
Runs scored	83	188	753
Batting average	27.66	15.66	12.76
100s/50s	0/1	0/1	0/0
Top score	58	62*	42*
Balls bowled	144	580	3,250
Wickets	1	23	195
Bowling average	83.00	17.39	20.07
5 wickets in innings	0	1	1
10 wickets in match	0	0	0
Best bowling	1/32	5/17	5/15
Catches/stumpings	4/–	3/–	57/–
- Source: ESPNcricinfo, 15 January 2021

Kevon Keston Cooper (born 2 February 1989) is a former cricketer from Trinidad and Tobago. He played for Trinidad and Tobago and Leeward Islands as well as for Rajasthan Royals in the IPL and in various other Twenty20 leagues around the world.

== Early life ==
Cooper comes from a footballing family. One of his brothers, Kevin Molino, plays for Minnesota United in Major League Soccer. He grew up playing football as well but was persuaded by his father, a cricket fan, to switch his allegiance. When Cooper was picked for the T&T Under-19 squad, he left football behind.

== Cricket career ==
In January 2011, cricket officials raised concerns over Cooper's bowling action, and he went to the University of Western Australia to undergo tests and undertake remedial work to correct the fault in his bowling action. In August 2011, Cooper was cleared to play.

He returned and participated in the Champions League in 2011. Mixing speeds with his medium pacers to good effect, he took five wickets in six games while conceding just 5.29 runs an over. Coming in at No. 7, he posted a strike rate of 191.17 at an average of 21.66. It was these attributes that drew the attention of the Royals, who bought him for $50,000 in the IPL player auction.

During Rajasthan Royals' first game against Kings XI Punjab, he hit his first ball for a six and followed it up with a four. With the ball in hand, he claimed 4 wickets. Against Kolkata Knight Riders, he took 3 more wickets.

== Spot Fixing ==
The 2013 Indian Premier League spot-fixing and betting case had come when the Delhi Police in India arrested three cricketers, S. Sreeshanth, Ajit Chandila and Ankeet Chavan, on the charges of alleged spot-fixing on 16 May 2013. The three represented the Rajasthan Royals in the 2013 Indian Premier League.

During investigation, Ajit Chandila has reportedly told the Delhi Police that he had allegedly contacted his teammates Brad Hodge, Kevon Cooper and Siddharth Trivedi to be part of Booking loop. The Delhi Police interrogated Siddharth, but it never interrogated Cooper.
