= Spot-fixing =

Class of illegal activity related to sports betting

Spot-fixing is an illegal activity in a sport in which a specific aspect of a game, unrelated to the final result but upon which a betting market exists, is fixed in an attempt to ensure a certain result in a proposition bet. Examples include minor events such as timing a no-ball or wide delivery in cricket or timing the first throw-in or corner kick in association football.

Spot-fixing attempts to defraud bookmakers by a player taking a pre-arranged action to fix the result of that specific event. It differs from match fixing in which the final result of a match is fixed or point shaving in which players (or officials) attempt to limit the margin of victory of the favoured team. Unlike these other forms of corruption, spot-fixing can be perpetrated by a lone fraudulent player without any other players or officials needing to co-operate.

The growth of Internet gambling and increased variety of betting options (for example, spread betting, first-scorer betting) resulted in the emergence of spot-fixing, particularly through the first decade of the 2000s. The most effective means to detect spot fixing is to search for unusual proposition betting activity. Since it is the bookmakers who bear the greatest financial risk, they have dedicated considerable resources to detecting unusual betting patterns on proposition markets. In jurisdictions where sports betting is legally sanctioned and regulated, evidence of spot fixing is usually forwarded to law enforcement or to the affected leagues and other governing bodies which may take disciplinary action against the player(s) involved.

== Examples ==
=== Association football ===
Following his retirement, Matt Le Tissier admitted that he had bet on the timing of the first throw-in in a match he played for Southampton F.C. against Wimbledon F.C. in April 1995. The plan failed when a teammate who was unaware of the scam managed to keep his underhit pass on the pitch. Le Tissier was forced to quickly kick the ball from play to prevent losing money on the bet and managed to "push" after kicking the ball out after 70 seconds. He stated that he felt so silly about the incident that he never attempted it again.

On 17 May 2024 near the conclusion of the 2023–24 A-League Men season, New South Wales Police arrested multiple players from Macarthur FC following an investigation into yellow card spot fixing. The conspiracy included team captain Ulises Dávila, and two other players, Kearyn Baccus and Clayton Lewis. They were alleged to have successfully manipulated games by accumulating yellow cards in two games early in the season, and attempted but failed to do the same again in two games late in the season.

=== Baseball ===
In July 2025, Cleveland Guardians pitcher Luis Ortiz was placed on paid leave by Major League Baseball due to allegations of unusual betting patterns on at least two of his pitches during the 2025 Major League Baseball season. The MLB investigation is ongoing.

=== Cricket ===
Spot fixing in cricket first came to international prominence in the 2010 Pakistan tour of England, when it was determined that Pakistani players Mohammad Asif and Mohammad Amir intentionally bowled no-balls on specific deliveries as part of a conspiracy involving captain Salman Butt to defraud bookmakers. As a result, Butt was banned for ten years, Asif for seven years and Amir for five years. The matter became a criminal investigation that resulted in custodial sentences for four people involved; in November 2011, Butt was sentenced to 30 months' imprisonment, with Asif being imprisoned for one year and Amir jailed for six months.

Five players in the 2012 Indian Premier League season were suspended for spot-fixing. The five players were Mohnish Mishra, Shalabh Srivastava, TP Sudhindra, Harmeet Singh and Abhinav Bali. The suspensions were not for any specific event during the season, but a sting operation revealed all five either discussing earlier cases of spot-fixing they had been involved in, or seeking future spot-fixing opportunities.

In India, three Indian players in IPL Season 6 (2013) were arrested for spot-fixing: Sreesanth, Ankeet Chavan and Ajit Chandila. Along with them, eleven bookmakers were arrested. The Delhi Police arrested the three players in a post-midnight operation in Mumbai on 16 May 2013 for accepting payments of up to Rs. 6 million, for giving away a pre-determined number of runs in an over. On 13 September, Sreesanth was given a lifetime ban from the sport.

In England, allegations of spot-fixing were made against Essex bowler Mervyn Westfield, after he bowled poorly in a Pro40 match against Durham in September 2009. Westfield later pleaded guilty to accepting money for spot-fixing in the match, specifically that he attempted to concede twelve runs from his first over (although he conceded only ten); he was banned for five years and his Essex team-mate and former Pakistan Test bowler Danish Kaneria received a life ban after he was found to have orchestrated the fix.

The advent of Twenty20 cricket is said to have made spot-fixing more difficult to detect in cricket, because the faster and more variable nature of the game makes anomalies related to spot-fixing less visible.

=== Rugby league ===
Australian rugby league player Ryan Tandy was found guilty of spot-fixing during a 2010 National Rugby League season match between North Queensland Cowboys and Canterbury-Bankstown Bulldogs. Tandy, playing for Canterbury-Bankstown, was involved in spot-fixing the first score of the match to be a North Queensland penalty goal. Observers noted that there had been an unusually high proportion of bets taken on the penalty goal option for the game. Then, in the opening minutes of the game, Tandy was found to have deliberately conceded a knock-on from the match's kick-off and then a penalty for slowing down the play-the-ball in the Cowboys' first attacking set in front of the goalposts, giving North Queensland a chance to kick an easy penalty goal. As it happened, the spot-fixing attempt was unsuccessful, as North Queensland passed up its penalty goal opportunity and scored a try instead. In 2011, Tandy was found guilty of attempting to dishonestly obtain a financial advantage on 6 October 2011, and he received a six-month correction order from the courts and a life ban from rugby league.

== See also ==
- Betting controversies in cricket
- Courtsiding, an equivalent concept prevalent in tennis
