= Mervyn Westfield =

English cricketer

Personal information
- Full name: Mervyn Simon Westfield
- Born: 5 May 1988 (age 38); Romford, London, England
- Height: 6 ft 0 in (1.83 m)
- Batting: Right-handed
- Bowling: Right-arm fast

Domestic team information
- Years: Team
- 2005–2010: Essex
- 2016: Suffolk

Career statistics
Competition	First-class	List A
Matches	7	8
Runs scored	46	31
Batting average	9.20	31.00
100s/50s	–/–	–/–
Top score	32	17
Balls bowled	655	246
Wickets	11	5
Bowling average	37.81	48.60
5 wickets in innings	–	–
10 wickets in match	–	–
Best bowling	4/72	2/32
Catches/stumpings	1/–	2/–
- Source: Cricinfo, 30 August 2010

Mervyn Simon Westfield (born 5 May 1988 in Romford, Greater London) is an English cricketer. He is a right-handed batsman and a right-arm medium-fast bowler who until September 2010 played for Essex. In January 2012, he became the first English cricketer to be convicted of spot-fixing, after admitting accepting £6,000 in exchange for bowling an over that was supposed to concede 12 runs.

== Essex career ==
Westfield played for the first time for Essex in the 2005 County Championship against Durham. He made one appearance in the Second XI Championship before the end of the season, and in 2006, played three matches as Essex finished third in Division Two of the 2006 County Championship.

In May 2010, he was arrested by Essex police in connection with "match irregularities" in the 2009 domestic season, along with team-mate Danish Kaneria. The investigations were believed to focus on a NatWest Pro40 match in September 2009 against Durham, which Essex won.

From 2006 onward, Westfield was an occasional player in the Essex side. During the 2010 County Championship, Westfield was released by Essex after struggling to find a regular place in the first team. Westfield has played as an upper-middle order batsman and as a tail-ender. He held a first-class bowling average of 37.81 by the time of his release by Essex.

== Spot-fixing charges ==
Following his arrest on suspicion of a spot-fixing irregularity, it was announced on 15 September 2010 by the Crown Prosecution Service, that Westfield was to be formally charged with conspiracy to defraud over claims he deliberately bowled wides as part of a spot-fixing scam. Antony Swift, of the Crown Prosecution Service, said Westfield would appear at City of London Magistrates' on 23 September 2010. His Essex teammate Danish Kaneria was released without charge following the investigation. Westfield was convicted on 12 January 2012 and was given a four-month prison sentence. On 22 June 2012, Kaneria was banned for life from playing cricket in England and Wales by the England and Wales Cricket Board (ECB), for his involvement in the scandal.

In February 2016, Westfield was given special dispensation by the ECB to allow him to play in 2nd XI matches and minor counties cricket. He later played three MCCA Knockout Trophy matches for Suffolk during the early part of the 2016 season.

In October 2018, Kaneria admitted to his involvement in the 2009 spot-fixing scandal.
