= Abhishek Jhunjhunwala =

Indian cricketer (born 1982)

Personal information
- Full name: Abhishek Arunkumar Jhunjhunwala
- Born: 1 December 1982 (age 43); Kolkata, West Bengal, India
- Batting: Right-handed
- Bowling: Right-arm off-break
- Role: Batsman

Domestic team information
- Years: Team
- 2010: Rajasthan Royals
- 2011: Pune Warriors India
- 2012: Deccan Chargers

Career statistics
Competition	FC	LA	T20
Matches	26	24	38
Runs scored	1,292	529	472
Batting average	30.76	29.38	18.15
100s/50s	4/4	0/4	0/2
Top score	139	84	54*
Balls bowled	744	300	121
Wickets	9	3	3
Bowling average	57.55	89.66	57.33
5 wickets in innings	0	0	0
10 wickets in match	0	0	0
Best bowling	3/42	2/58	1/5
Catches/stumpings	16/-	3/–	20/–
- Source: ESPNcricinfo, 3 April 2024

Abhishek Arunkumar Jhunjhunwala (born 1 December 1982) is an Indian first-class cricketer. He played for the Royal Bengal Tigers and the Indian World Team in the Indian Cricket League Twenty20 competition, before signing for the Rajasthan Royals in the Indian Premier League in 2010. In that season, he was included in 13 matches, and scored a total of 183 runs, the most runs out of all of his seasons

In the 4th season of IPL, in 2011, he played for Pune Warriors India. In that season, he was included in 2 matches, and scored 10 runs in total. In the 5th season of IPL, in 2012, he moved to the now terminated team, Deccan Chargers. During that season, he was included in 5 matches, and scored a total of 24 runs. That season would be his final season that he would play in.

Abhishek is now playing for Hampton Wick having moved from Richmond Cricket Club (London) to become HW's Director of Cricket.
