= Rahul Sharma (cricketer, born 1986) =

Indian cricketer (born 1986)

Personal information
- Full name: Rahul Sharma
- Born: 30 November 1986 (age 39); Jalandhar, Punjab, India
- Height: 6 ft 4 in (1.93 m)
- Batting: Right-handed
- Bowling: Legbreak googly
- Role: Bowler

International information
- National side: India
- ODI debut (cap 193): 8 December 2011 v West Indies
- Last ODI: 28 July 2012 v Sri Lanka
- ODI shirt no.: 13
- T20I debut (cap 41): 3 February 2012 v Australia
- Last T20I: 3 February 2012 v Australia

Domestic team information
- Years: Team
- 2006/07–2013/14: Punjab
- 2010: Deccan Chargers
- 2011–2013: Pune Warriors India
- 2014: Delhi Daredevils

Career statistics
Competition	ODI	T20I	FC	LA
Matches	4	2	22	35
Runs scored	1	–	538	126
Batting average	1.00	–	18.55	8.40
100s/50s	0/0	–	0/3	0/0
Top score	1	–	95	31
Balls bowled	206	44	3,611	1740
Wickets	6	3	42	54
Bowling average	29.50	18.66	49.28	24.57
5 wickets in innings	0	0	1	0
10 wickets in match	0	0	0	0
Best bowling	3/43	2/29	6/92	4/28
Catches/stumpings	1/–	0/–	17/–	14/–
- Source: ESPNcricinfo, 2 August 2024

Rahul Sharma (born 30 November 1986) is an Indian former cricketer. He was primarily a right-handed legbreak and googly bowler. He was a member of the Punjab cricket team from 2006 to 2014. He came into the limelight due to his impressive bowling performances in IPL 2011 for Pune Warriors.

== Early career ==
Rahul started as a medium pacer but soon turned to leg spin after his coach suggested him. He made his debut in first class cricket on 25 December 2006 for Punjab against Rajasthan, but had to wait till 2009 to play again. In 2009–10 season of the Ranji Trophy, he took 13 wickets in seven first class games. Rahul played only one Ranji match in the 2010–11 season.

== Indian Premier League ==
In 2010, Rahul Sharma made his IPL debut for Deccan Chargers. He took just five wickets and went at 8.08 an over in the six matches he played for Deccan Chargers. In the 2011 IPL, Rahul Sharma made a name for himself with some good bowling performances for Pune Warriors. His figures of 4-0-7-2 against Mumbai Indians were the most economical of 2011 Indian Premier League and the performance created enough of a buzz to see his name trend on Twitter in India. In 2013, Sharma's reputation got damped in a single game as Chris Gayle smacked him for 5 continuous sixes in a single over in an IPL Game between Royal Challengers Bengaluru and Pune Warriors India, Gayle went on to score 175* which still stands as the highest individual score in IPL history and RCB set a 263 total which was then the highest team total in IPL until 2024. Later In 2015 Rahul Sharma was bought by Chennai Super Kings in the IPL 8 auction.

=== Other leagues ===
In September 2022, he was named in the Bhilwara Kings squad for the 2022 Legends League Cricket.

== International career ==
On 8 December 2011, Rahul made his ODI debut for India in the 4th ODI against the West Indies and took three wickets. All three batsmen were bowled. In the same match Virender Sehwag set a new record(219) for the highest score in ODIs.
Rahul scored his first run, and only run, in One Day Internationals against Australia at the Melbourne Cricket Ground on 5 February 2012. He scored 1 run off 2 balls before being bowled by Xavier Doherty.

On 1 February 2012, Rahul made his Twenty20 International debut for India in the 1st T20 of the series against Australia at the Stadium Australia/Sydney Olympic Park currently known as ANZ Stadium. He injured his finger while bowling his first over but came back later to continue bowling. His first Twenty20 International wicket was that of David Hussey who was bowled clean.

== Bell's Palsy ==
Rahul Sharma had suffered from a form of facial paralysis called Bell's Palsy a few days before the beginning of the IPL 2010 series.

== Controversies ==
Rahul Sharma was caught along with Wayne Parnell after he tested positive for consumption of drugs in a rave party. He later said he had no clue about the rave party and had gone there to attend a birthday celebration.
