= Pune Warriors India =

Indian Premier League Twenty20 cricket team

- League: Indian Premier League

Personnel
- Captain: Sourav Ganguly
- Coach: Geoff Marsh
- Owner: Sahara India Pariwar

Team information
- City: Pune, Maharashtra, India
- Founded: 2011; 15 years ago
- Dissolved: 2013; 13 years ago
- Home ground: DY Patil Stadium, Mumbai (2011); Maharashtra Cricket Association Stadium, Pune (2012–2013)

Pune Warriors India was a franchise Twenty20 cricket team that represented the city of Pune in the Indian Premier League (IPL). The team was one of two IPL franchises from the Indian state of Maharashtra, the other being Mumbai Indians. It was one of two new franchises added to the IPL for the 2011 season, alongside the also-defunct Kochi Tuskers Kerala. The team was owned by Sahara Group Sports Limited, a group company of the Indian business conglomerate Sahara India Pariwar. The team's home ground was the Maharashtra Cricket Association Stadium located in Pune.

In May 2013, Pune Warriors India withdrew from the IPL over financial differences with the Board of Control for Cricket in India (BCCI) stemming from the valuation of the league's annual franchise fee. Their last match was on 19 May 2013 against Delhi Daredevils. The franchise was officially terminated by the BCCI five months later, in October 2013.

The team was unsuccessful in their three years in the tournament despite having the services of numerous top cricketers, finishing second from last in their inaugural season and in their final season and last in 2012. Overall, the team played 46 matches, winning 12 and losing 33, with one match a no-result due to rain. The team's leading run scorer was Robin Uthappa and its leading wicket-taker was Rahul Sharma.

== Franchise history ==
On 21 March 2010, Sahara Adventure Sports Limited successfully bid ₹17.02 billion (US$370 million) for the Pune franchise, the highest bid by any company in the history of IPL. The Videocon Group, an Indian consumer appliance manufacturer, also bid for the team, but were unsuccessful. Along with Kochi Tuskers Kerala, the team joined the existing eight IPL teams for the 2011 season as Sahara Pune Warriors, then BCCI wrote to the franchise that the team name cannot be used as a promotion which is against IPL clauses. So they were introduced to the league as Pune Warriors India.

=== 2011 season ===
Being a new team in the IPL with a fresh auction purse, Warriors bid aggressively in the 2011 IPL auction held on 9 January 2011. They signed a number of top international cricketers including Graeme Smith, Mitchell Marsh, Callum Ferguson, Wayne Parnell, Jerome Taylor, Yuvraj Singh, Robin Uthappa, Jesse Ryder, Angelo Mathews, Murali Kartik, Ashish Nehra, and Alfonso Thomas as well as a number of uncapped Indian players who had previously played for others franchises, including Rahul Sharma, Abhishek Jhunjhunwala, Mithun Manhas, Mohnish Mishra, Ganesh Gaikwad, Manish Pandey and Kamran Khan. Yuvraj Singh was appointed as captain, while former Australian opener Geoff Marsh was appointed as the team's coach. On 3 May 2011, the Pune Warriors selected former Indian captain Sourav Ganguly to play for them as a replacement for the injured Ashish Nehra. This marked Ganguly's comeback to the IPL. Ganguly had been discarded by his former team Kolkata Knight Riders prior to the 2011 IPL auction and was not bought by any of the teams in the auction.

The Warriors got off to a successful start in the 2011 Indian Premier League by defeating Kings XI Punjab and Kochi Tuskers Kerala at home. Following this successful start, however, the team's performance went downhill and they only won another 2 matches that season, which were against Kings XI Punjab and Deccan Chargers, both away. Their final match of the season against Delhi Daredevils away was abandoned due to rain. Pune finished 9th and second-last that season with 4 wins, 9 losses and 1 no-result in 14 matches.

=== First withdrawal from IPL and return ===
Sahara withdrew Pune Warriors India from the IPL along with the sponsorship of the Indian cricket team just hours before the 2012 IPL auction was about to start, dealing a major blow to the BCCI and the IPL, which was already reeling after the disbanding of Kochi Tuskers Kerala in late 2011. They also boycotted the auction held on 4 February 2012. The main reason for the withdrawal was due to a problem in the amount of franchise fee to be paid by the Pune team. Sahara insisted that it had bid a huge amount for the Pune franchise under the notion that there would be 94 matches in the 2011 IPL season. As the BCCI later reduced the number of IPL matches to 74, Sahara demanded a reduction in the amount of franchise fee to be paid by them to maintain viable IPL proposition. Other reasons included disputes between Sahara and the BCCI regarding the IPL rules, such as player retention and the 4-foreign player rule and also the refusal on the part of the BCCI to allow Pune to add Yuvraj Singh's price to their auction purse so that they could buy another player as a replacement for Yuvraj. Yuvraj was set to miss the whole 2012 season as he was undergoing treatment for germ cell cancer. On 6 February 2012, Subrata Roy, the chairman of Sahara India Pariwar, said that Sourav Ganguly will take a call on reconciliation. A week later, the BCCI announced that they have allowed Yuvraj Singh's replacement for Pune Warriors India for the 2012 season, though a deadlock still persisted between the two parties on long-term sponsorship.

On 16 February 2012, the BCCI and Sahara ended their differences and announced that Pune Warriors India will play in IPL 5. The BCCI agreed to give Sahara a total purse of $3.4 million, $1.6 million from the money that they had for the auction and $1.8 million as compensation due to the absence of Yuvraj. It was also decided that Pune could replace Yuvraj with one player, whose fees would be up to $1.8 million. IPL's trading window was extended up to 29 February 2012 to allow the team to purchase players. Pune was also allowed the compensation of playing 5 foreign players in the squad, subject to the consent of the other 8 franchises. The BCCI also allowed Sahara to have a strategic partner in the franchise. Pune's new stadium would be allowed to host one of the play-off matches, provided Royal Challengers Bangalore gave consent, because according to a BCCI rule, the right to host the play-off matches is given to the finalist of the previous edition. (RCB were the runners-up in the previous tournament). BCCI agreed to negotiate with Sahara regarding the amount of franchise fee to be paid and also agreed to start arbitration proceedings for the same.

=== 2012 season ===
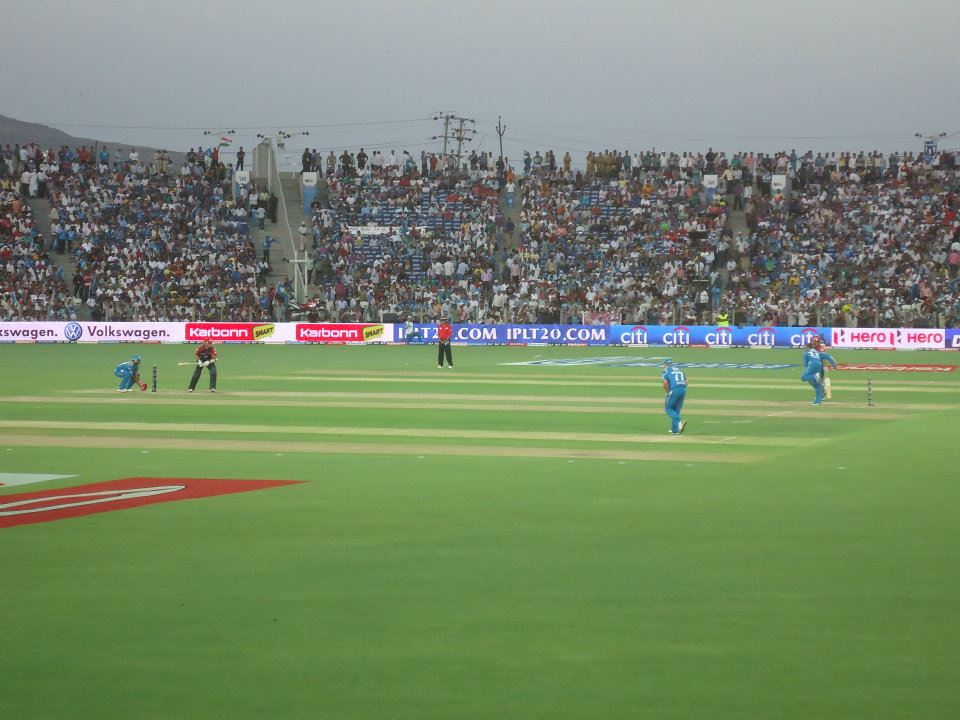
Pune Warriors India in action against Delhi Daredevils at the Subrata Roy Sahara Stadium

Though Pune boycotted the IPL auction, they signed international cricketers outside the auction including Marlon Samuels, Luke Wright, Steve Smith, Tamim Iqbal, James Hopes and Michael Clarke. They also signed Indian players including Raiphi Gomez, Ali Murtaza, Ashok Dinda, Anustup Majumdar and Mahesh Rawat. Due to Yuvraj's unavailability for the entire season, Ganguly was made the captain of the franchise. He was also made part of the coaching staff as a mentor. Former South African fast bowler Allan Donald and former Indian batsman Praveen Amre were also roped in as bowling and batting coaches respectively, replacing Marsh who had resigned to become the Sri Lankan coach.

The team started off their IPL 2012 campaign with wins against Mumbai Indians and Kings XI Punjab away and at home respectively. But just like in 2011, the team could not maintain the initial momentum and again won only two more matches that season, against defending champions Chennai Super Kings at home and Delhi Daredevils away. Midway through the season, Ganguly was sacked as captain and was dropped from the team due to lack of results, but was retained as mentor. However, this decision was later reversed and he returned to the team as captain. For the home match against Royal Challengers Bangalore, Ganguly rested himself, with Steve Smith taking up the captaincy, but still, the team lost by 35 runs. Pune finished last that season with 4 wins and 12 losses in 16 matches.

=== 2013 season ===
For the 2013 season, Pune Warriors India retained Steve Smith, Tamim Iqbal, Marlon Samuels and Luke Wright but released Clarke, James Hopes, Callum Ferguson, Alfonso Thomas, Murali Kartik and Jesse Ryder. Ganguly announced his retirement from all forms of cricket in October 2012, leaving the franchise without a captain. In the auction which was held on 3 February 2013, Clarke was bought back by the franchise for $400,000. The team also bought international players like Ajantha Mendis and Kane Richardson and signed domestic players like Abhishek Nayar, Tirumalasetti Suman, Ishwar Pandey, Parvez Rasool and Udit Birla for the 2013 season. The franchise also swapped a player with the Delhi Daredevils, trading Nehra for New Zealand batsman Ross Taylor. Yuvraj also returned to the team following his recovery from cancer. Unfortunately for the franchise, Clarke, who was the frontrunner to lead the team, was ruled out of the entire season with a recurring back and hamstring injury, which was aggravated during the Australian tour of India held earlier. On 28 March 2013, the franchise named Sri Lankan Test and ODI captain and all-rounder Angelo Mathews as the captain for the 2013 season and also signed Australian batsman Aaron Finch as a replacement for Clarke.

The team's performance in the 2013 season was pathetic and mirrored its performance in 2012 with 4 wins and 12 losses in 16 matches, finishing 8th and second-last in the league. The only matches the team won were against Rajasthan Royals (home), Chennai Super Kings (away), Kolkata Knight Riders (away) and Delhi Daredevils (home). The Warriors were thoroughly humiliated in their away match against Royal Challengers Bangalore, courtesy Chris Gayle's 175 not out off only 66 balls and later became the first team in the 2013 season to be knocked out of contention for the playoffs after a loss to Chennai Super Kings at home. Like the previous seasons, the main cause for the team's poor performance was their constant squandering of winning chances and the lack of balance in the team, with more than 30 players being used during the season. The team was the only IPL franchise to use three captains that season. Mathews was sacked as captain following a poor start by the Warriors in the tournament and his own poor form and was replaced by Taylor for the away match against Chennai Super Kings. Following this match, Taylor was also sacked as captain due to his poor form, in spite of the team winning in Chennai, and was replaced by Finch, who captained the Warriors for the rest of the season.

=== Second and final withdrawal from IPL ===
On 21 May 2013, just two days after finishing its league campaign, Sahara withdrew Pune Warriors India from the IPL for the second time in three years. The reason, according to BCCI, was the encashing of the team's bank guarantee after Sahara defaulted on paying the entire franchise fee. BCCI sources said that Sahara paid 20% of the franchise fee in January 2013 and had promised to pay the remaining amount by 19 May 2013 but they failed to do so. But Sahara blamed BCCI for the decision to pull out the Pune franchise from the IPL. In a statement from Sahara after pulling out Pune Warriors India from the IPL, it stated that Sahara had to pull out of IPL due to the BCCI's stubborn and disinterested attitude towards the reduction of the Pune team's franchise fee. It also stated that Sahara was "disgusted" by the unsporting and biased attitude of the BCCI towards it and the Pune franchise despite its supporting of Indian cricket for more than a decade, the decision to withdraw from the IPL was final and it will not return to the IPL even if the entire franchise fee is waived by the BCCI. However, it added that Sahara would remain the sponsor of the Indian cricket team until December 2013, when its contract with the BCCI expires, following which it asked the BCCI to find a new sponsor for the team. Speaking to the media on 24 May 2013, Subrata Roy said that the attitude of BCCI president and India Cements chairman N. Srinivasan towards Sahara and the Pune franchise was the main reason for the withdrawal of Sahara from IPL and Indian cricket and also added that Sahara would never be associated with Indian cricket as long as Srinivasan is at the helm of BCCI affairs.

On 26 October 2013, the BCCI officially terminated its agreement with the team, bringing an end to the team's IPL sojourn.

== Home ground ==
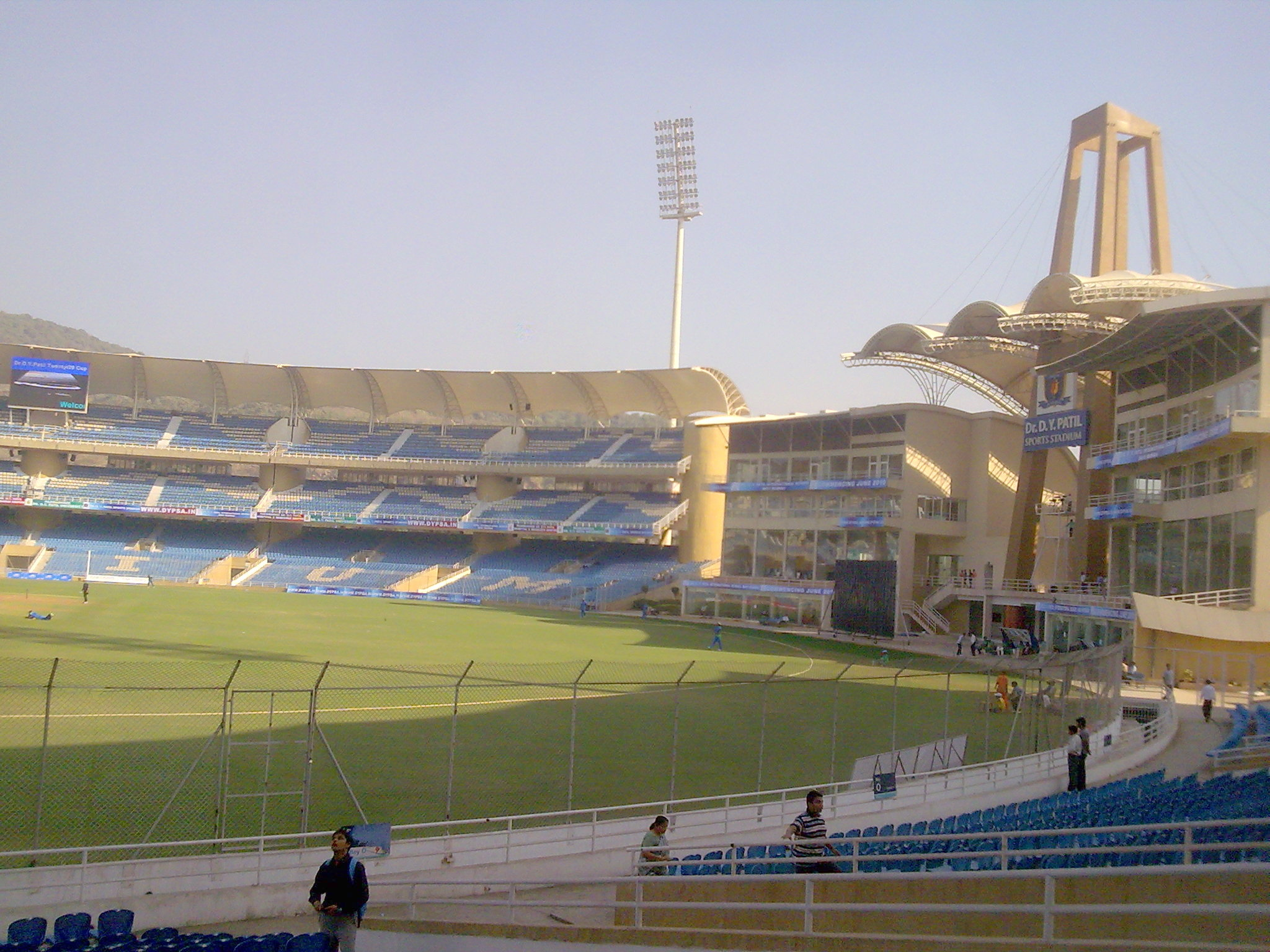
DY Patil Stadium, the initial "home" ground of Pune Warriors India

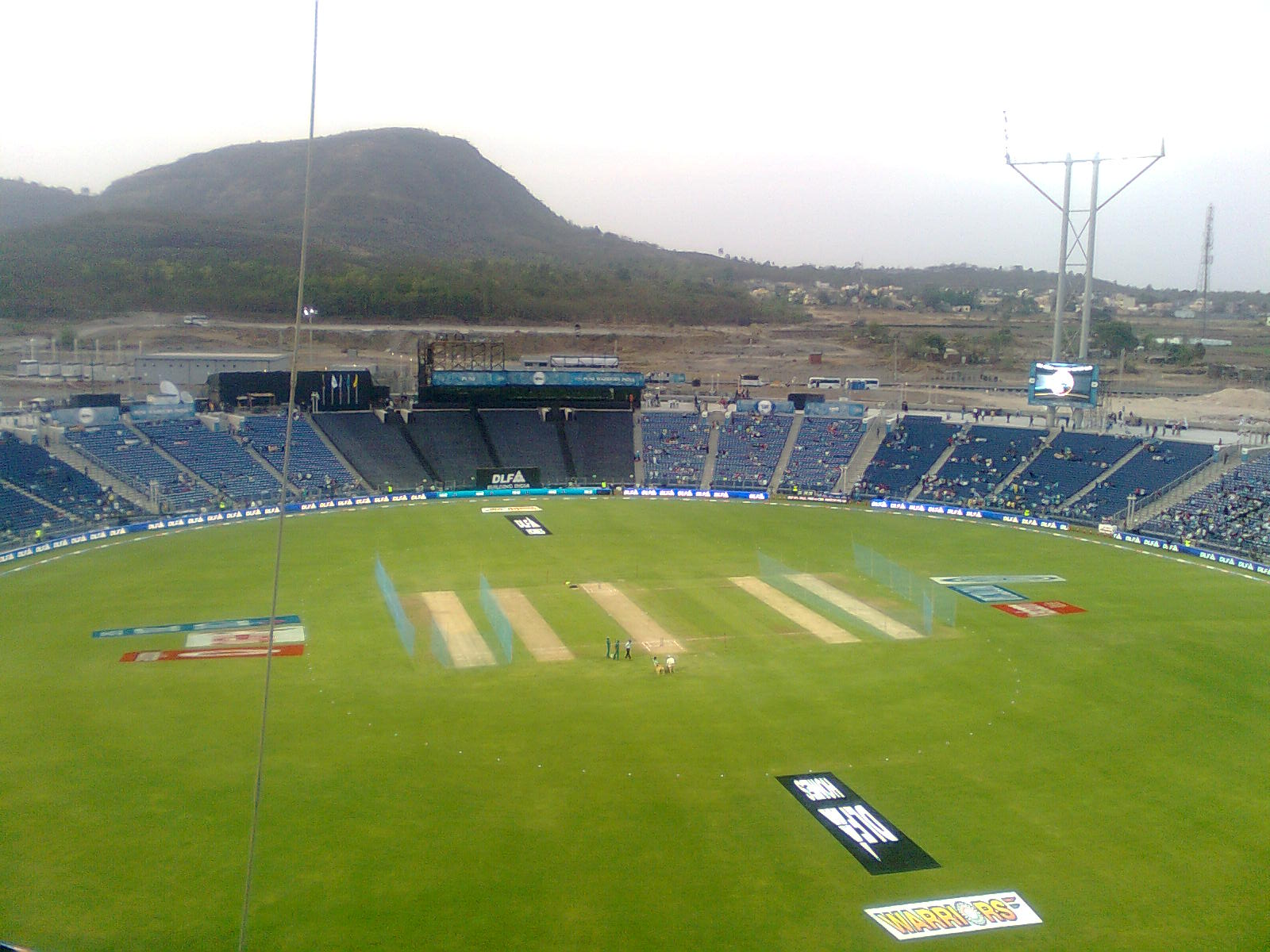
Maharashtra Cricket Association Stadium at Gahunje, the home ground of Pune Warriors India from 2012 to 2013

In their inaugural season in 2011, the team played their home matches at the DY Patil Stadium at Navi Mumbai, as their designated home venue, the Maharashtra Cricket Association Stadium, was still under construction. Only from the 2012 season onwards did the team actually begin to play their home matches in Pune at the Subrata Roy Sahara Stadium, named after the Chairman of Sahara India Pariwar. It is located at Gahunje, a village located about 23 kilometres (14 mi) north-west of Pune on the Mumbai Pune Expressway. It has a seating capacity of 37,000 spectators.

The stadium became a source of contention between Sahara India Pariwar and the Maharashtra Cricket Association (MCA). In early 2013, Sahara moved court over the termination of the agreement between it and the MCA over the stadium by the latter. MCA had terminated the agreement on the ground due to Sahara defaulting over payments to the MCA and had renamed the stadium as the MCA Pune International Cricket Centre. Sahara decided to play all their home matches outside Pune till the issue was resolved. On 15 March 2013, the issue was finally resolved, with Sahara agreeing to pay all existing dues within three months. The stadium was renamed back to Subrata Roy Sahara Stadium and MCA also allowed Pune Warriors India to play all its home matches in the stadium.

== Team identity ==
=== Team name and logo ===
The Pune franchise named the team Pune Warriors India in honour of the Maratha Empire which once ruled from the city. The Pune Warriors India logo was a spear wielding, attacking cavalry-warrior (warrior on horse) in the hue of the Indian tricolour.

=== Jersey colours ===
In their inaugural season, the team's jersey was black with tricolor stripes and silver accents. The jersey also incorporated the attacking warrior logo in the top-left corner of the shirt. From the 2012 season onwards, the primary colour of the jersey was changed to turquoise blue. Adidas was the kit manufacturer for the first two seasons, but for the third season, T. K. Sportswear was the kit manufacturer. Indian online fashion clothing brand American Swan was the official lifestyle clothing partner for the team.

=== Sponsors ===
For their first two seasons, the naming rights sponsor for the team was TVS Motors. TVS was replaced as the team's main sponsor for their final season by Sansui Electric, a Japanese consumer appliance manufacturer. The other sponsors were Lux Cozi, Nissan, UB Group, Linc Pens, Oakley, YOU Broadband, Killer Jeans and Finolex Group. For the three seasons of Exide BMW was the main sponsor. BMW was be replaced by Brittania as the main sponsor. The other sponsors are IndiGo, Seagrams, Jockey, Reynolds, Raymond Group, Fastrack, Airtel and Ashirwad Pipes.

=== Theme song ===
The team's official theme song was "Sahara Saharaa", a Hindi song sung by playback singer and music composer Shankar Mahadevan. The video of the song showed a warrior riding on a horse and inspiring the Pune residents to come to the stadium where they witnessed the team cricketers. Then the team cricketers as well as the residents performed the Sahara salute (putting the right hand over the heart and saying "Jai Sahara").

=== Indian cheerleaders ===
Pune Warriors India was the only IPL franchise which used Indian cheerleaders unlike the other franchises which used foreign cheerleaders. Known as Cheer Queens, these cheerleaders were dressed up in traditional Indian attire designed by famous Bollywood designer Neeta Lulla and performed traditional Indian dances choreographed by ace choreographers Ganesh Hegde and Tanusree Shankar, not the traditional gymnastic routines which are usually associated with cheerleading. In the words of Subrata Roy-

With Pune Warriors India's Cheer Queens, we intend to showcase and bring recognition to the rich and diverse culture of India at an international platform. The opportunity, which we want all the franchisees of IPL to avail collectively, so that the rich cultural heritage of India is presented in an innovative way to the world.

== Kit manufacturers and sponsors ==
Adidas was the kit manufacturer for the first two seasons, but for the third season, TK Sports Pvt Ltd was the kit manufacturer. Indian online fashion clothing brand American Swan was the official lifestyle clothing partner for the team. For their first two seasons, the main sponsor for the team was TVS Motors. TVS was replaced as the team's main sponsor for their final season by Sansui Electric, a Japanese consumer appliance manufacturer.

Year	Kit manufacturer	Shirt sponsor (chest)	Shirt sponsor (back)
2011–2012	Adidas	TVS	Max New York Life
2012–2013	Adidas	TVS	Q Shop
2013–2014	TK	Sansui	Lux Cozi

== Seasons ==
=== Indian Premier League ===
Year	League standing	Final standing
2011	9th out of 10	League stage
2012	9th out of 9	League stage
2013	8th out of 9	League stage

== Performance ==
=== Overall results in the IPL ===
Year	Wins	Losses	No result	% Win	Position
2011	4	9	1	28.57%	9/10
2012	4	12	0	25%	9/9
2013	4	12	0	25%	8/9
Total	12	33	1	26.08%	

== See also ==
- Rising Pune Supergiant
