= Abhinav Bali =

Indian cricketer (born 1985)

Personal information
- Born: 2 June 1985 (age 41); Delhi, India
- Source: ESPNcricinfo, 21 October 2015

Abhinav Bali (born 2 June 1985) is an Indian first-class cricketer who plays for Himachal Pradesh.

In June 2012, Bali was among five uncapped Indian cricketers banned by the Board of Control for Cricket in India (BCCI) for their involvement in corruption in domestic cricket. Out of the five, fast bowler TP Sudhindra was banned from all cricketing activities for life and paceman Shalabh Srivastava for five years.

Mohnish Mishra, Amit Yadav and Abhinav Bali were each handed one-year bans. The BCCI said at the time that "the three players, through loose talk and unsubstantiated bragging, brought the game into disrepute, and hence, have been held guilty of the lesser offence.".
