= Shalabh Srivastava =

Indian cricketer (born 1981)

Personal information
- Full name: Shalabh Jagdishprasad Srivastava
- Born: 22 September 1981 (age 45); Allahabad, Uttar Pradesh, India
- Nickname: Sonu
- Batting: Right-handed
- Bowling: Left-arm fast-medium
- Role: Bowler

Domestic team information
- Years: Team
- 1999/002010/11: Uttar Pradesh
- 2010–2011: Kings XI Punjab
- 2007–2008: Delhi Giants
- Source: ESPNcricinfo, 11 April 2016

Shalabh Jagdishprasad Srivastava (born 22 September 1981) is an Indian first-class cricketer. He is a left arm fast-medium bowler who played for Uttar Pradesh, Kings XI Punjab and Delhi Giants before he was banned.

Srivastava represented India in the 2000 ICC Under-19 Cricket World Cup in Sri Lanka where he topped their wicket taker's list with 14 victims. He was part of Uttar Pradesh's Ranji Trophy winning side in 2006–07.

Srivastava was suspended by the Board of Control for Cricket in India for spot fixing on 15 May 2012, after a local news channel, India TV reportedly accused him along with 4 others players based on a sting operation.
