= Ajit Chandila =

Indian cricketer

Personal information
- Full name: Ajit Chandila
- Born: 5 December 1983 (age 42); Faridabad, India
- Batting: Right-handed
- Bowling: Right-arm offbreak
- Role: All-rounder

Domestic team information
- Years: Team
- 2010–2013: Haryana
- 2012–2013: Rajasthan Royals

Career statistics
Competition	FC	LA	T20
Matches	2	9	28
Runs scored	23	38	151
Batting average	23.00	5.42	18.87
100s/50s	0/0	0/0	0/1
Top score	12	9	57
Balls bowled	162	267	497
Wickets	3	7	24
Bowling average	22.66	38.14	20.70
5 wickets in innings	0	0	0
10 wickets in match	0	0	0
Best bowling	2/15	3/25	4/13
Catches/stumpings	0/–	2/–	12/-
- Source: ESPNcricinfo, 19 January 2015

Ajit Chandila (born 5 December 1983) is a former Indian cricketer from Haryana. He played for Rajasthan Royals until 2013 but was previously known for his performances for the Air India North Zone team.

== Indian Premier League career ==
His IPL career started in 2011 when Delhi Daredevils selected him in their probable team. He made his IPL debut on 23 April 2012 at Jaipur He was mentored by Indian spinner Narendra Hirwani. Chandila became the first bowler in the IPL fifth season to take a hat-trick. He is the seventh bowler to get a hat-trick in IPL history.

Chandila got into controversy in IPL 6 when he ran out Adam Gilchrist and appealed against him when Gilchrist was caught short of the crease while taking evasive action to a throw that hit him on the glove. Gilchrist termed it completely against the spirit of the game.

== Spot fixing allegation and arrest ==
=== Criminal Case ===
On 16 May 2013, he was arrested on charges of spot-fixing during IPL 6 by the Delhi police along with Sreesanth and Ankeet Chavan, who played alongside him for Rajasthan Royals.

Chandila had allegedly received ₹4.9 million (US$52,000) from bookies in the 2013 IPL season, of which ₹1.5 million (US$16,000) was paid to him to spot-fix in the match against Mumbai Indians on 17 May 2013 before which he was arrested.

Delhi Police filed 6,000-page Charge Sheet against 42 persons, including Chandila before the Patiala House Court, Delhi. In July 2015, the Patiala Court discharged all the 36 accused persons, including Sreesanth, Chandila, Singh and Ankeet Chavan, except the 06 absconding persons.

The Discharge has been challenged by the Delhi Police before the Delhi High Court, where it is presently pending.

=== Disciplinary Case ===
After being arrested, he was immediately suspended by his employer, Air India. In January 2016, he was given a life ban from all forms of cricket by the BCCI. The ban was later reduced to a 7-year period by the BCCI ombudsman, having officially ended on 18 January 2023.
