= S. Sreesanth =

Indian cricketer (born 1983)

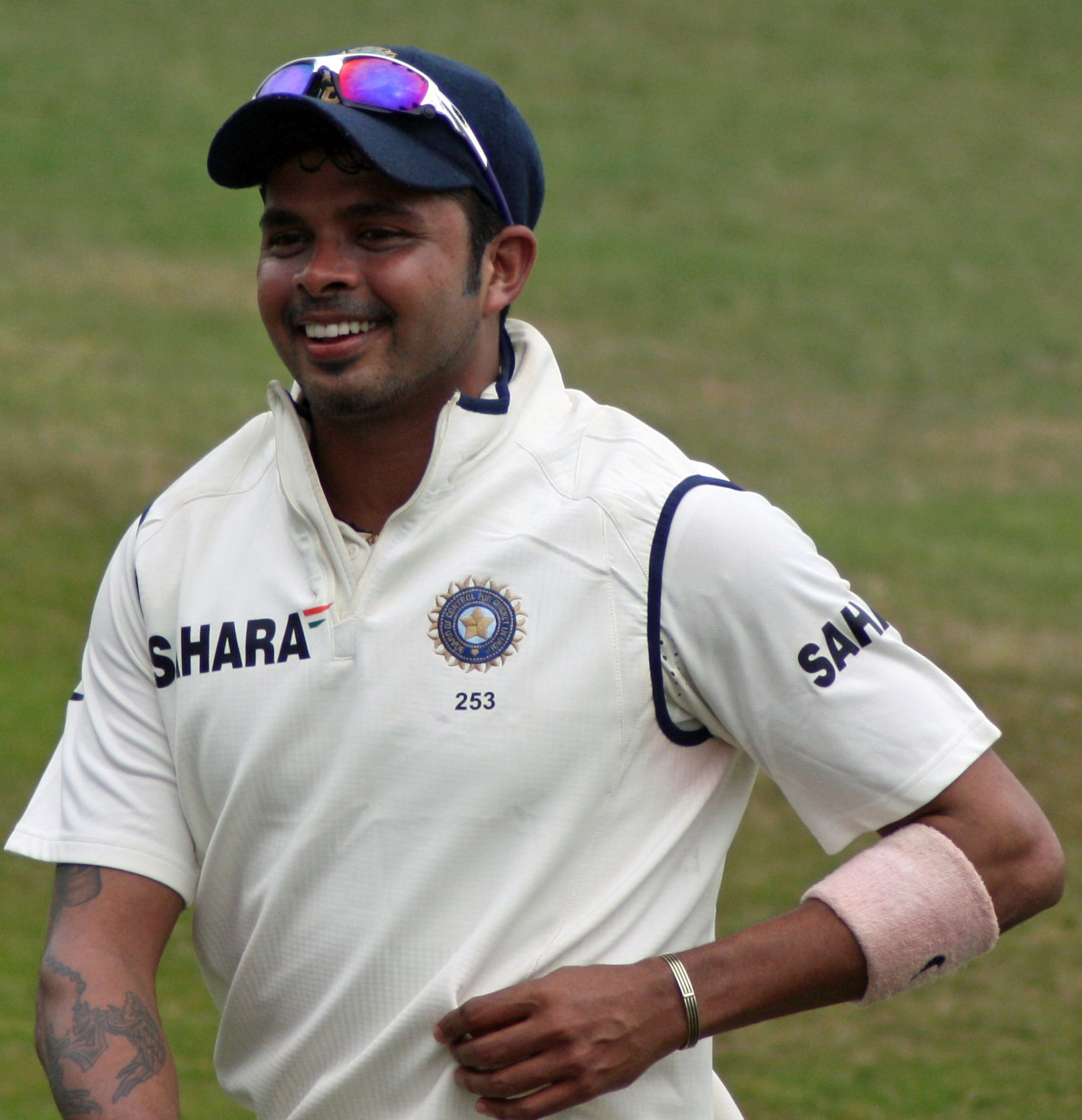

Personal information
- Full name: Shanthakumaran Nair Sreesanth
- Born: 6 February 1983 (age 43); Kothamangalam, Kerala, India
- Nickname: Sree, Gopu
- Height: 5 ft 11 in (1.80 m)
- Batting: Right-handed
- Bowling: Right-arm fast-medium
- Role: Bowler
- Relatives: Madhu Balakrishnan (brother-in-law)

International information
- National side: India (2005–2011)
- Test debut (cap 253): 1 March 2006 v England
- Last Test: 18 August 2011 v England
- ODI debut (cap 162): 25 October 2005 v Sri Lanka
- Last ODI: 2 April 2011 v Sri Lanka
- ODI shirt no.: 36
- T20I debut (cap 10): 1 December 2006 v South Africa
- Last T20I: 1 February 2008 v Australia

Domestic team information
- Years: Team
- 2002/03–2021/22: Kerala
- 2008–2010: Kings XI Punjab
- 2009: Warwickshire
- 2011: Kochi Tuskers Kerala
- 2013: Rajasthan Royals

Career statistics
Competition	Test	ODI	T20I	FC
Matches	27	53	10	74
Runs scored	284	44	20	680
Batting average	10.40	4.00	20.00	9.71
100s/50s	0/0	0/0	0/0	0/0
Top score	35	10*	19*	35
Balls bowled	5,419	2,476	204	13,182
Wickets	87	75	7	213
Bowling average	37.59	33.44	41.14	35.92
5 wickets in innings	3	1	0	6
10 wickets in match	0	0	0	0
Best bowling	5/40	6/55	2/12	5/40
Catches/stumpings	5/–	7/–	2/–	16/–
Medal record
Men's Cricket
Representing India
ICC Cricket World Cup
Winner	2011 India-Bangladesh-Sri Lanka
ICC T20 World Cup
Winner	2007 South Africa
ACC Asia Cup
Runner-up	2008 Pakistan
- Source: ESPNcricinfo, 22 February 2021

Shanthakumaran Nair Sreesanth (born 6 February 1983) is an Indian former cricketer and film actor who played all formats of the game for his country. He is a right-arm fast-medium-pace bowler and a right-handed tail-ender batsman. In first class cricket, he played for Kerala. In the Indian Premier League (IPL) he played for the Rajasthan Royals. He became the first Kerala Ranji player to play Twenty20 cricket for India. Sreesanth was initially banned for life after spot-fixing in the 2013 IPL, however, the ban was reduced to seven years in August 2019. In 2018, he participated in the popular reality show, Bigg Boss and became the runner up. In 2020 he was selected for the Kerala cricket team and resumed his career in national cricket. In March 2022, Sreesanth announced his retirement from domestic cricket. Sreesanth was a member of the Indian team that won both the 2007 T20 World Cup and the 2011 Cricket World Cup, where in the 2007 final, he took the winning catch.

== Personal life ==
Sreesanth was born on 6 February 1983 to Santhakumaran Nair and Savithri Devi. He has an elder brother and two elder sisters. His brother Dipu Santhan owns a music company in Kochi and his eldest sister Nivedita is a television actress in Kerala. Sreesanth's elder sister Divya married Madhu Balakrishnan, a famous South Indian playback singer.

On 12 December 2013, Sreesanth married his girlfriend Bhuvneshwari Kumari of Jaipur's Shekhawat family at Guruvayur Sri Krishna temple in Kerala. Bhuvneshwari Kumari aka Nain Shekhawat is the daughter of Hirendra Singh Shekhawat and Muktha Singh.

== Early years ==
Sreesanth initially was a leg-spinner in his childhood, modelling his action on India's leading Test wicket-taker Anil Kumble, who was to become his Test captain. However, his habit of bowling yorkers led him to convert to fast bowling, after being encouraged by his elder brother. Following in the footsteps of fellow Kerala fast bowler Tinu Yohannan, who earned selection to the National Cricket Academy in 2000, Sreesanth was selected for the MRF Pace Foundation in Chennai. He made his first-class debut against Goa in the 2002–03 domestic season, claiming 22 wickets in seven matches in Ranji Trophy and winning selection for South Zone in the Duleep Trophy squad in the same season.

He was selected for India-A side in a tour match against the visiting New Zealand side at Rajkot. He claimed one wicket in twelve overs after being restricted with a hamstring injury. He also missed five Ranji Trophy games in that season, although he still travelled with the side for away games. This led to rumours that an astrologer had convinced him to take a break from competition to preserve his longevity in the sport, which Sreesanth categorically denied, maintaining that he was training only to regain his fitness.

In November 2004, Sreesanth entered the record books when he took a hat-trick against Himachal Pradesh in a Ranji Trophy game. He was selected to represent India B in the Challenger Trophy in October 2005, a domestic limited-overs tournament. He performed impressively in that tournament, earning the Man of the Series award and being the leading wicket taker (7) with the third best bowling average. This led to his selection to Indian team for the home ODI series against Sri Lanka.

== ODI career ==
Sreesanth was given the new ball in the first ODI against Sri Lanka in Nagpur. After being punished early by Kumar Sangakkara and Sanath Jayasuriya, Sreesanth returned to claim his first two ODI wickets at the end of the match. He was left out of the team and was later recalled for the fourth, fifth and sixth ODIs as coach Greg Chappell tinkered with the line-up. He was retained in the squad but did not play in the 5 match series against South Africa, but played all five matches in the tour to Pakistan, recording a haul of 4/58 in the fifth ODI against Pakistani cricket team in Karachi. A good home series against the England in April 2006, in which he claimed 10 wickets at an average of 16.3, including a career best 6/55 in the final match at Indore (in which he was awarded the man of the match award ), led to him subsequently being awarded a BCCI contract, in the C-grade in May.

His disappointing economy rate led him to be left out of the ICC Champions Trophy squad of 14, with the beneficiary being R. P. Singh. He made an unexpected come back to the blue squad due to the injury to Ajit Agarkar later in the tournament. He was also out of the Indian ODI team for the England tour.

In the 2011 Cricket World Cup, Sreesanth was selected due to injury to Praveen Kumar. He was expensive in the first game going wicketless at 53 runs in 5 overs. He was selected in the final where he gave away 52 runs in 8 wicketless overs.

== Test career ==
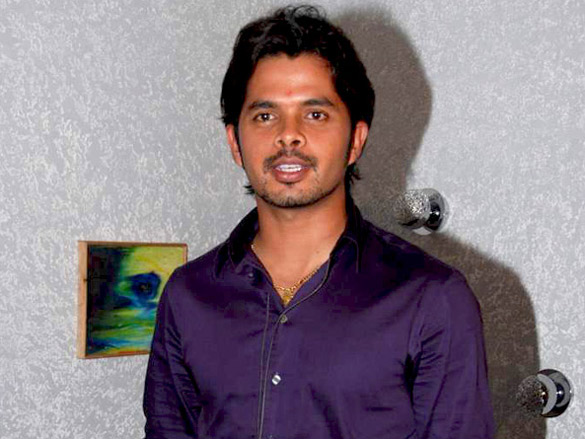
Sreesanth at an event in 2012.

Sreesanth was selected for his first Test squad in the home series against England in March 2006, in place of Zaheer Khan. He claimed 4/95 in his debut appearance in the 1st Test in Nagpur, where he opened the bowling with Irfan Pathan. He was ruled out of the second Test in Mohali due to illness, but recovered and captured five wickets as well as a 29* with the bat in the Third Test in Mumbai. With the axing of Pathan, Sreesanth became India's leading pace bowler on the tour of the West Indies. He missed the second Test due to an injury but managed to claim his best match figures of 5/72 in the 4th Test in Kingston, Jamaica.

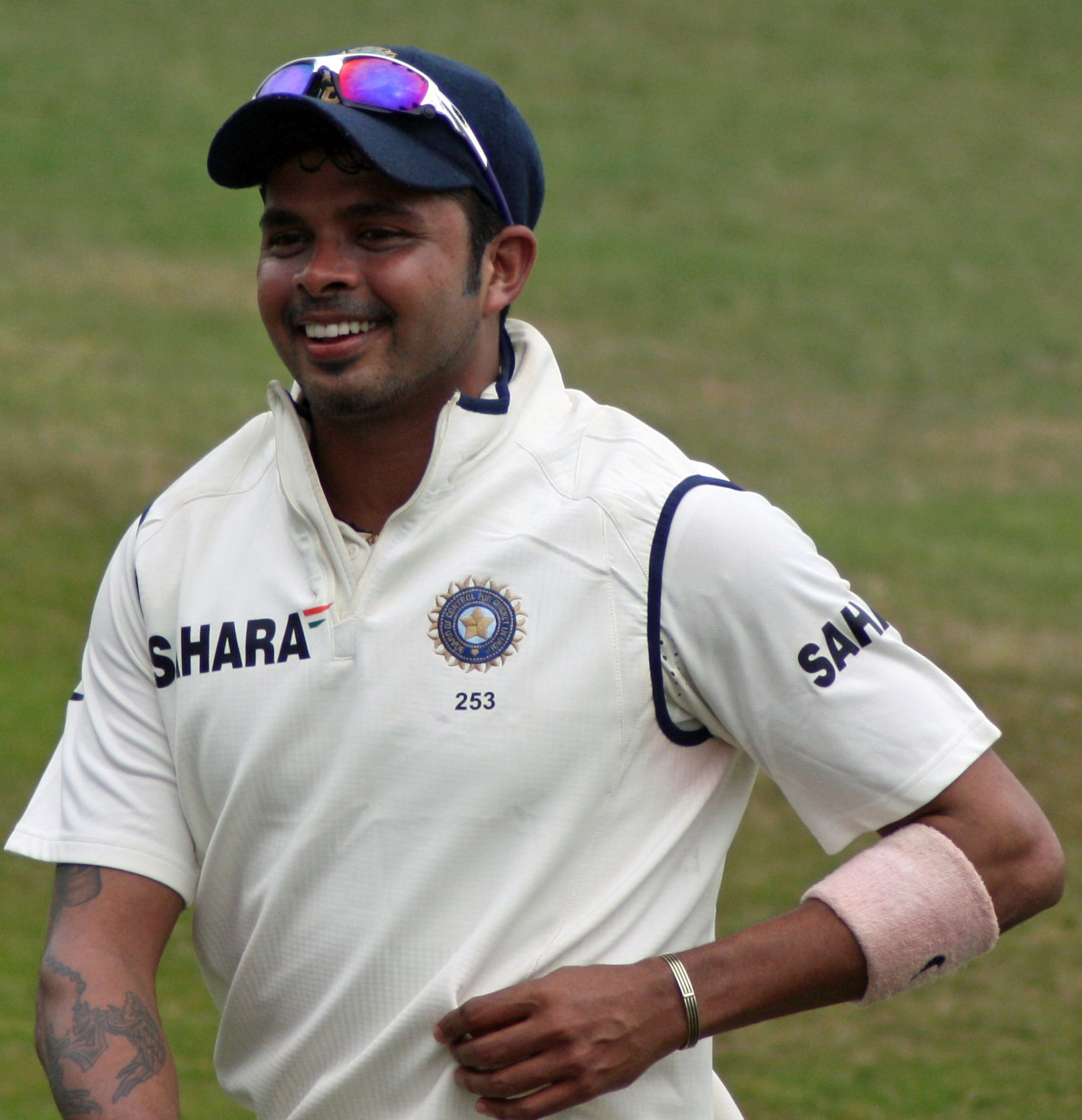
Sreesanth playing for India against Somerset in 2011.

Sreesanth's most significant performance to date in Test cricket was his role in the first Test of India's 2006 tour to South Africa at Johannesburg. After losing the limited-overs series 4–0, Sreesanth produced a spell of 5–40 in a display of pace and swing bowling to help dismiss South Africa for just 84 runs, leading to the first Indian win on South African soil, for which he was named man of the match. Again, Sreesanth's emotional antics, which have led him to be regarded by some commentators as eccentric, were frequently noted. He was fined after breaching the International Cricket Council's advertising logo policy, and also for "conduct contrary to the spirit of the game" for sending off Hashim Amla after dismissing him. He was also involved in a highly publicised confrontation while batting against paceman André Nel. Nel delivered a series of fast balls at Sreesanth's upper body and after Sreesanth ungainly evaded one delivery, taunted him by gesturing to his chest, indicating that he felt Sreesanth was lacking in courage. On the next ball, Sreesanth gave him the charge and hit the ball straight over the bowler's head into the stands for a six. He then whirled his bat in enthusiasm and danced down the wicket, making fun of Nel and performing a dance. Later, Sreesanth said that he would not repeat anything of the sort, since he could be suspended for violating the code of conduct. Even though he went unpunished for the Nel incident, he was fined 30% of the match fee for running towards Hashim Amla after picking up his wicket, and wearing a branded garment under the jersey.

Sreesanth courted controversy once again during the fourth day of the second test of India's 2007 tour to England at Trent Bridge. He was fined half of his match fee for deliberately shoulder barging England captain Michael Vaughan whilst walking back to his mark. He also bowled a beamer at batsman Kevin Pietersen, which the latter had to take drastic action to avoid. Sreesanth however did immediately apologise afterwards. After the match he said that the ball had slipped from his hand. Soon afterwards, he bowled a no-ball where he overstepped the crease by roughly 2 feet (0.61 m), leading to speculation it was deliberate; the delivery was a bouncer to Paul Collingwood. Former England captain Michael Atherton called for Sreesanth to be banned for the Pietersen beamer, saying that Sreesanth could not control his on-pitch emotions.

After leaving out of the Indian team for about a year and half, Sreesanth was called back to play the home Test series against Sri Lanka in November 2009. Sreesanth played the second Test in Kanpur and picked up five wickets in the first innings, which helped India win the match by an innings and 144 runs. Sreesanth was awarded the Man of the Match for taking six wickets in the match. After the match, Indian captain Mahendra Singh Dhoni praised him as one of the best bowlers of reverse swing.

== 2007 ICC World Twenty20 ==
In September 2007, Sreesanth joined the Indian team in South Africa for the inaugural ICC T-20 world cup following his omission for the one-day series in England. Although his performance in the tournament lacked consistency, Sreesanth managed breakthroughs at critical junctures that were vital to his team's success. During the semifinal match against Australia which India won, Sreesanth got the vital wickets of the Australian openers Adam Gilchrist and Matthew Hayden. The latter proved to be decisive in turning the match round in India's favour. His spell of 2–12 was named as the third-best T20I bowling performance of the year by ESPNcricinfo voters. In the final against rivals Pakistan, he performed slightly expensively. However, with Pakistan on the verge of winning, he took the tournament-winning catch of Misbah-Ul-Haq while standing on fine leg.

== English county cricket ==
In August 2009, Sreesanth signed a deal to play for Warwickshire for the remainder of the English season. He played five matches and took 13 wickets including a five-for against Yorkshire.

== Indian Premier League ==
Sreesanth associated with the Rajasthan Royals in the Indian Premier League. In the inaugural edition of the IPL in 2008, Sreesanth became the second leading wicket taker in the tournament after Sohail Tanveer, claiming 18 wickets. Sreesanth appeared only in the second half of the 2009 edition of the IPL. He could not play the initial matches of the season owing to a stress fracture. He left Kings XI Punjab after the 2010 Indian Premier League and signed for Kochi for the 2011 competition. He signed for Rajasthan royals for the 2012 competition. But he didn't play in 2012 due to injuries. With his spot-fixing controversy coming into light during the 2013 IPL competition, Rajasthan Royals terminated his contract.

=== Altercation with Harbhajan Singh ===
On 25 April 2008, following the victory of his Kings XI Punjab in the Indian Premier League over the Mumbai Indians at Mohali, Sreesanth was slapped under his eye by Harbhajan Singh, the captain of Mumbai. The incident came to light as Sreesanth was caught by TV cameras sobbing inconsolably on the field before the presentation ceremony. Sreesanth later downplayed the incident, saying he had no complaints against Harbhajan who was "like an elder brother" to him. Harbhajan's team had lost their third consecutive match when he apparently reacted violently to Sreesanth approaching him and saying "hard luck". The IPL banned Harbhajan from the remainder of the tournament and prohibited him from collecting his salary after finding him guilty. The BCCI launched a separate investigation into the incident and decided to ban Harbhajan for five ODIs, deeming him to have broken the code of conduct in his national contract. In Australia earlier that year, Sreesanth stated that he would maintain an aggressive attitude on the cricket field, "Sreesanth's way is to be aggressive. Sreesanth will always remain Sreesanth."

=== Spot fixing allegation and arrest ===
On 16 May 2013, the Delhi police arrested Sreesanth and two of his Rajasthan Royals teammates, Ajit Chandila and Ankeet Chavan from Mumbai, on charges of spot-fixing during IPL 6. Jiju Janardhan, another key figure accused of spot-fixing, is reported to be Sreesanth's cousin and an under-22 Gujarat player. On 17 May 2013, Sreesanth allegedly confessed to spot-fixing, according to police.

Delhi Police filed 6,000-page Charge Sheet against 42 persons, including Chandila before the Patiala House Court, Delhi. In July 2015, the Patiala Court discharged all the 36 accused persons, including Sreesanth, Chandila, Singh and Ankeet Chavan, except the 06 absconding persons.

The Discharge has been challenged by the Delhi Police before the Delhi High Court, where it is presently pending.

Sreesanth, and the two other players accused of spot fixing had their Rajasthan Royals contracts suspended while their inquiries were pending.

On 13 September 2013, Sreesanth and Ankeet Chavan were banned for life by BCCI's disciplinary committee.

Sreesanth challenged his life ban after his getting acquitted in the Criminal case. Initially a Single Bench of Kerala High Court quashed the life ban on Sreesanth in August 2017 but the BCCI challenged this order before a Double Bench of Kerala High Court, which reversed the previous order and upheld the life ban.

In March 2019, the Supreme Court of India "set aside" the life ban imposed on him by the BCCI. The apex court of the country asked the BCCI to "reconsider" and "revisit" the length of any fresh ban. Following which the BCCI reduced his ban to 7 years, which meant that he could play all forms of the game from 13 September 2020.

=== Other T20 leagues ===
In Legends League Cricket Sreesanth is playing for Gujarat Giants.

== Comeback after ban ==
Since the life ban imposed on him, it had been reduced to a seven-years ban, Sreesanth had talked about doing "everything possible to get back on the field". The ban officially ended on 13 September 2020. Sreesanth was selected in the Kerala Team for the Syed Mushtaq Ali Trophy and Vijay Hazare Trophy in 2021. He played the first match after his ban in the Syed Mushtaq Ali Trophy in January 2021. On 9 March 2022, Sreesanth announced his retirement from domestic cricket.

== Incidents ==
Sreesanth is noted for his exuberant and emotional behaviour, especially whilst appealing for and celebrating wickets. He has been warned several times for indiscipline both on and off the cricket field, and frequently fined for violating the player conduct guidelines of the International Cricket Council. In October 2009, the BCCI issued a final warning to Sreesanth that any repetition of his code of conduct violations might result in drastic actions such as a ban from domestic cricket. Subsequently, the Kerala Cricket Association also issued a final warning over repeated violations of their code of conduct after Sreesanth failed to turn up at the Kerala Ranji Trophy team camp in Kannur.

In November 2009, however, after more than 18 months of omission from the national team, Sreesanth was recalled to the Test squad for the first two matches against Sri Lanka. He replaced Ishant Sharma for the second Test in Kanpur, where his five wicket haul in the first innings of the match earned him the Man of the Match award and helped India to win the Test match by an innings and 144 runs.

== Name ==
=== Correct name ===
In the English-language media, Sreesanth's full name has been the source of some confusion. He has been variously referred to as "Sree Sreesanth", "Sri Sreesanth", "Shantha Sreesanth". and "Shanthakumaran Sreesanth". He has also stated in the past that he wished to be known as "Sree Santh". In September 2007, Sreesanth said that his name was just "Sreesanth" and that the other variations were incorrect:

"It's Sreesanth. There is no Shanthakumaran Sreesanth, there is no S. Sreesanth. There was this function recently where they called me Sree Sreesanth, then Sree, and finally S Sreesanth. It's just Sreesanth."

=== Decision and cancellation of name change ===
When his form slumped in 2006, Sreesanth had tried to change his luck by changing his name to Sreesunth, on numerological advice. He later stated that he was not going to change the name due to sentimental reasons. The word 'santh' in his name is derived from his father's name Santhakumaran Nair.

== Film career ==
Year	Film	Role	Language	Notes	Ref.
2017	Aksar 2	Gaurav	Hindi		
2017	Team 5	Akhil	Malayalam		
2019	Cabaret	Chetta Don	Hindi	Released on ZEE5	
2019	Kempe Gowda 2	Deshmukh	Kannada	17th Santosham Film Awards – Best Villain – Kannada	
2022	Kaathuvaakula Rendu Kaadhal	Mohammed Mobi	Tamil		

== Television career ==
In 2008, he participated in the reality show Ek Khiladi Ek Haseena along with Surveen Chawla.

In 2014, Sreesanth participated in the dance reality show Jhalak Dikhhla Jaa in its seventh season. He survived for 5 weeks until he got eliminated.

In 2018, Sreesanth participated as a celebrity contestant in the twelfth season of Bigg Boss, the Indian version of the reality TV show Big Brother, where he finished as the runner up of the show. His stay in the house was highly controversial and he ended up as the most controversial contestant of the season and one of the most controversial contestants of the show in general. While he formed close friendships with fellow housemates including season winner Dipika Kakar and Shivashish Mishra, he frequently engaged in ugly fights with most of the other housemates and even guests including Season 11 contestant Vikas Gupta and threatened to leave the house 299 times.

=== Television ===
Year	Shows	Role	Channel	Language	Notes
2008	Ek Khiladi Ek Haseena	Contestant	Colors TV	Hindi	Along with Surveen Chawla
2014	Jhalak Dikhhla Jaa 7	Contestant	Colors TV	Hindi	Eliminated 5th week
2015	Vismayaravu	Co-Host	Flowers TV	Malayalam	
2015	Star Challenge	Host	Flowers TV	Malayalam	Game show
2016	Dare the fear	Judge (finale)	Asianet	Malayalam	Game show
2017	D 4 Dance	Celebrity Judge	Mazhavil Manorama	Malayalam	Reality show
2018	Bigg Boss 12	Contestant	Colors TV	Hindi	Runner Up
2019	Fear Factor: Khatron Ke Khiladi 9	Contestant	Colors TV	Hindi	Eliminated 3rd Week
2021	Top Singer season 2	Celebrity Judge	Flowers TV	Malayalam	Reality show
2021	Udan Panam 3.0	Contestant	Mazhavil Manorama	Malayalam	Game show
2022	Panam Tharum Padam	Contestant	Mazhavil Manorama	Malayalam	Game show
2022	Super Kudumbam	Judge	Mazhavil Manorama	Malayalam	Game show
2022–2023	Dancing Stars	Judge	Asianet	Malayalam	Reality Show

== Political career ==
On 25 March 2016, Sreesanth joined the Bharatiya Janata Party (BJP). He contested and lost the 2016 Kerala Legislative Assembly election from Thiruvananthapuram constituency. He secured a total of 34,764 votes but lost the election to V. S. Sivakumar of the Indian National Congress by 11,710 votes.
