= 2011 Indian Premier League group stage =

Visitor team →	CSK	DC	DD	KXIP	KTK	KKR	MI	PWI	RR	RCB
Home team ↓	CSK	DC	DD	KXIP	KTK	KKR	MI	PWI	RR	RCB
Chennai Super Kings		Chennai; 19 runs	Chennai; 18 runs		Chennai; 11 runs	Chennai; 2 runs		Chennai; 25 runs	Chennai; 8 wickets	Chennai; 21 runs
Deccan Chargers			Delhi; 4 wickets	Punjab; 8 wickets		Kolkata; 20 runs	Mumbai; 37 runs	Pune; 6 wickets	Rajasthan; 8 wickets	Deccan; 33 runs
Delhi Daredevils		Deccan; 16 runs		Delhi; 29 runs	Kochi; 7 wickets	Kolkata; 17 runs	Mumbai; 8 wickets	Match abandoned		Bengaluru; 3 wickets
Kings XI Punjab	Punjab; 6 wickets	Deccan; 82 runs	Punjab; 29 runs				Punjab; 76 runs	Pune; 5 wickets	Punjab; 48 runs	Punjab; 111 runs
Kochi Tuskers Kerala	Kochi; 7 wickets (D/L)	Deccan; 55 runs	Delhi; 38 runs	Punjab; 6 wickets		Kochi; 17 runs			Kochi; 8 wickets	Bengaluru; 6 wickets
Kolkata Knight Riders	Kolkata; 10 runs (D/L)	Kolkata; 9 runs		Kolkata; 8 wickets	Kochi; 6 runs		Mumbai; 5 wickets		Kolkata; 8 wickets	Bengaluru; 9 wickets
Mumbai Indians	Mumbai; 8 runs	Deccan; 10 runs	Mumbai; 32 runs	Mumbai; 23 runs	Kochi; 8 wickets			Mumbai; 7 wickets	Rajasthan; 10 wickets	
Pune Warriors India	Chennai; 8 wickets	Deccan; 6 wickets	Delhi; 3 wickets	Pune; 7 wickets	Pune; 4 wickets	Kolkata; 7 wickets	Mumbai; 21 runs			
Rajasthan Royals	Chennai; 63 runs		Rajasthan; 6 wickets		Rajasthan; 8 wickets	Kolkata; 9 wickets	Rajasthan; 7 wickets	Rajasthan; 6 wickets		Bengaluru; 9 wickets
Royal Challengers Bengaluru	Bengaluru; 8 wickets			Bengaluru; 85 runs	Bengaluru; 9 wickets	Bengaluru; 4 wickets (D/L)	Mumbai; 9 wickets	Bengaluru; 26 runs	Match abandoned	

Home team won	Visitor team won

- Note: Results listed are according to the home (horizontal) and visitor (vertical) teams.
- Note: Click on a result to see a summary of the match.

Team	Group matches														Playoffs			
Team	1	2	3	4	5	6	7	8	9	10	11	12	13	14	Q1	E	Q2	F
Chennai Super Kings	2	2	4	4	4	6	8	10	12	12	14	16	18	18	W			W
Deccan Chargers	0	0	2	2	4	4	6	6	6	6	6	8	10	12				
Delhi Daredevils	0	0	2	2	4	4	4	6	6	8	8	8	8	9				
Kings XI Punjab	0	2	4	6	6	6	6	6	6	8	10	12	14	14				
Kochi Tuskers Kerala	0	0	2	4	6	6	6	6	8	10	10	10	12	12				
Kolkata Knight Riders	0	2	4	6	6	6	8	10	12	12	14	14	16	16		L		
Mumbai Indians	2	4	4	6	8	10	10	12	14	16	16	16	16	18		W	L	
Pune Warriors India	2	4	4	4	4	4	4	4	4	6	8	8	8	9				
Rajasthan Royals	2	4	4	4	5	5	7	9	11	11	11	11	11	13				
Royal Challengers Bengaluru	2	2	2	2	3	5	7	9	11	13	15	17	17	19	L		W	L

Win	Loss	No result

- Note: The total points at the end of each group match are listed.
- Note: Click on the points (group matches) or W/L (playoffs) to see the match summary.

== Matches ==
8 April 2011
20:00 (D/N)
Scorecard

(H) Chennai Super Kings; 153/4 (20 overs)	v	Kolkata Knight Riders; 151/7 (20 overs)
Anirudha Srikkanth 64 (55); Jacques Kallis 2/34 (3 overs)		Jacques Kallis 54 (42); Suresh Raina 1/3 (1 over)

Chennai won by 2 runs
M. A. Chidambaram Stadium, Chennai
Umpires: Billy Doctrove (WI) and Paul Reiffel (Aus)
Player of the match: Anirudha Srikkanth (Chennai)

- Chennai Super Kings won the toss and elected to bat.

The first match of IPL 2011 saw defending champions Chennai Super Kings start off their title defense with a home game against Kolkata Knight Riders. Chennai captain MS Dhoni won the toss and elected to bat first. But it was Kolkata who got the start getting the wicket of Murali Vijay for 4 (4b, 1x4) in the first over. New batsman Suresh Raina then consolidated with Anirudha Srikkanth before accelerating, having some luck in the way as Yusuf Pathan dropped both batsmen, as Chennai reached a good score of 78/1 after 10 overs. Anirudha was dropped again, but next ball Raina was caught for 33 (29b, 4x4) off Pathan. MS Dhoni came to the crease, and despite having a good partnership with Anirudha who reached his half-century, Chennai were unable to up the run-rate. Jacques Kallis got Dhoni for 29 (21b, 1x4, 1x6) in the 18th over and followed it up by getting Anirudha out for 64 (55b, 6x4, 2x6) leaving Chennai 138/3 with 4 balls left before Albie Morkel's quick 15 (9b, 1x4, 1x6) got Chennai to 153/4 at the end of their 20 overs.

In reply, Kolkata started off well, with openers Manvinder Bisla and Jacques Kallis reaching 50 without losing a wicket in under 6 overs, but Chennai fought back after the Powerplay, restricting the flow of runs and finally getting Bisla for 27 (29b, 3x4). Yusuf Pathan came in and rapidly increased the run rate along with Kallis, and with Kolkata seemingly cruising at 93/1 in under 13 overs, a brilliant throw from Dhoni had Pathan run out for 11 (12b, 1x6). Kallis motored on to his half-century, but mistimed a sweep to short fine-leg on 54 (42b, 7x4) and this started a slump, with Eoin Morgan going cheaply for 6 (6b, 1x4) and captain Gautam Gambhir for 1 (2b). The runs dried up, but with the equation looking difficult, a couple of sixes by Manoj Tiwary off Suraj Randiv reduced it to 9 off 8 balls. A dot ball followed and then Tiwary was stumped off the next ball for 27 (15b, 1x4, 2x6) leaving Kolkata 9 to get off the last over. With 7 required off 5, Tim Southee got the wicket of set Laxmi Shukla for 14 (10b, 2x4) leaving 7 off 4. The new batsmen were unable to hit a boundary, and Rajat Bhatia only managed a leg-bye with 4 required off the last ball, as Chennai won by just 2 runs.

9 April 2011
16:00
Scorecard

(H) Deccan Chargers; 137/8 (20 overs)	v	Rajasthan Royals; 141/2 (18.5 overs)
Dwaraka Ravi Teja 28 (20); Siddharth Trivedi 3/15 (4 overs)		Johan Botha 67* (47); Dale Steyn 2/18 (4 overs)

Rajasthan won by 8 wickets
Rajiv Gandhi International Cricket Stadium, Hyderabad
Umpires: Rudi Koertzen (SA) and Shavir Tarapore (Ind)
Player of the match: Siddharth Trivedi (Rajasthan)

- Rajasthan Royals won the toss and elected to field.

Match 2 saw the Deccan Chargers playing the Rajasthan Royals at home, and it was Rajasthan who elected to field after winning the toss. The Deccan openers, Shikhar Dhawan and Ishank Jaggi however, got their team off to a flyer, both men hitting some well-placed boundaries as they reached 40 in 4.4 overs. Dhawan then went for one shot too many and was caught on 24 (15b, 2x4, 1x6). Siddharth Trivedi then got Deccan captain Kumar Sangakkara for a duck and Bharat Chipli for 6 (9b, 1x4) to reduce Deccan to 53–3. Along with captain Shane Warne who then had Jaggi hole out to long on for 25 (28b, 3x4) and JP Duminy also hole out for 14 (17b, 1x6) to reduce Deccan to 77-5 after 13 overs, run rate below 6. Daniel Christian and Dwaraka Ravi Teja then started a minor recovery, adding 37 in just over 4 overs until Trivedi returned to get Christian for 26 (19b, 1x4, 2x6), finishing with great figures of 3/15 (4 overs). Ravi Teja also accelerated until he too holed out for 28 (20b, 2x4, 1x6) at the start of the last over. Deccan managed 7 runs after this wicket, and finished on 137/8 from their 20 overs.

The Rajasthan chase started perfectly, with opener Amit Paunikar giving them a start by hitting a string of boundaries in the first two overs. The Deccan bowlers then staged a minor fightback, drying up the runs before Dale Steyn got Paunikar to edge one to the keeper on 20 (19b, 4x4). Rahul Dravid and Johan Botha consolidated first, getting themselves set before increasing the run rate with a boundary on average every over, also keeping the required run rate in check. Steyn returned to bowl Dravid for 28 (35b, 2x4) but Botha hit some more boundaries to give the momentum back to Rajasthan. He went on to reach his 50 and exploded after that, and the Deccan bowlers had no more success. Rajasthan reached their target with more than an over left, with Botha not out on 67 (47b, 8x4, 1x6) and a quick unbeaten 21 (14b, 1x4, 2x6) from Ross Taylor.

9 April 2011
20:00 (D/N)
Scorecard

(H) Kochi Tuskers Kerala; 161/5 (20 overs)	v	Royal Challengers Bangalore; 162/4 (18.4 overs)
Brendon McCullum 45 (32); Virat Kohli 1/14 (2 overs)		AB de Villiers 54* (40); Raiphi Gomez 1/20 (1 over)

Bangalore won by 6 wickets
Jawaharlal Nehru Stadium, Kochi
Umpires: Kumar Dharmasena (SL) and Krishna Hariharan (Ind)
Player of the match: AB de Villiers (Bangalore)

- Kochi Tuskers Kerala won the toss and elected to bat.

The Kochi Tuskers Kerala, one of the new franchises had their first ever IPL match, a home one to a revamped Royal Challengers Bangalore. Kochi won the toss and elected to bat first, and the decision was vindicated as the openers got off to a brilliant start. Brendon McCullum started off by hitting Dirk Nannes for two fours and a six at the start of the second over, and later VVS Laxman also joined in. The 6th over, bowled by Abhimanyu Mithun went for 18, and Kochi were off to a brilliant start at 61/0 after 6 overs. They continued to go strongly, until Laxman hit a slog-sweep straight to deep midwicket while on 36 (29b, 2x4, 2x6), but Kochi were still well placed at 80/1 after 9 overs. But, McCullum fell soon after when trying to hit a scoop off part-timer Virat Kohli on 45 (32b, 4x4, 2x6) and the run rate began to slow down. Captain Mahela Jayawardene was stumped for 18 (18b, 2x4) while trying to increase the run rate, and Kochi were 126/3 with 4 overs left but Brad Hodge then hit a couple of boundaries until Zaheer Khan smashed his leg stump while on 27 (21b, 3x4). Raiphi Gomez went for a first-baller but Ravindra Jadeja stayed not out on 23 (16b, 2x4, 1x6) to carry Kochi to 161/5.

The Bangalore reply didn't start off too well, with opener Tillakaratne Dilshan slicing one to cover at the start of the second over having scored just 1 (4b). Mayank Agarwal and Virat Kohli then recovered, with the former hitting some big shots and latter some elegant boundaries, until Kohli was trapped in front by Vinay Kumar on 23 (18b, 4x4) but Bangalore were 48/2 after 6 overs, well on course with the required rate. Bangalore continued to move rapidly, with Agarwal hitting legendary spinner Muttiah Muralitharan for six in his first ball and AB de Villiers brilliantly scooping Sreesanth for six. Agarwal then found long-off on 33 (24b, 2x4, 2x6), leaving Bangalore at 85/3 after 10 overs, and a required run rate of 7.7. de Villiers and Saurabh Tiwary started to consolidate but some good bowling by the top Kochi bowlers restricted the flow of runs and left Bangalore with 33 needed off 3 overs. The 18th over, bowled by parttimer Raiphi Gomez proved decisive. First hit for a six by de Villiers, he fought back to get the wicket of Tiwary for 26 (24b, 2x4) but de Villiers hit the last two balls for sixes, getting his half-century and leaving Bangalore with just 13 off 2 overs. Asad Pathan hit three boundaries in the next over and finished off the match, with Bangalore winning by six wickets. de Villiers was not out on 54 (40b, 1x4, 5x6), a matchwinning knock.

10 April 2011
16:00
Scorecard

(H) Delhi Daredevils; 95 (17.4 overs)	v	Mumbai Indians; 99/2 (16.5 overs)
Naman Ojha 29 (30); Lasith Malinga 5/13 (3.4 overs)		Sachin Tendulkar 46* (50); Morné Morkel 1/29 (4 overs)

Mumbai won by 8 wickets
Feroz Shah Kotla, Delhi
Umpires: Amiesh Saheba (Ind) and Russell Tiffin (Zim)
Player of the match: Lasith Malinga (Mumbai)

- Delhi Daredevils won the toss and elected to bat.

10 April 2011
20:00 (D/N)
Scorecard

Kings XI Punjab; 112/8 (20 overs)	v	Pune Warriors India (H); 113/3 (13.1 overs)
Ryan McLaren 51* (43); Shrikant Wagh 3/16 (3 overs)		Mithun Manhas 35 (32); Ryan McLaren 1/26 (3 overs)

Pune won by 7 wickets
DY Patil Stadium, Navi Mumbai
Umpires: Billy Doctrove (WI) and Paul Reiffel (Aus)
Player of the match: Shrikant Wagh (Pune)

- Kings XI Punjab won the toss and elected to bat.

11 April 2011
20:00 (D/N)
Scorecard

(H) Kolkata Knight Riders; 163/4 (20 overs)	v	Deccan Chargers; 154/8 (20 overs)
Jacques Kallis 53 (45); Amit Mishra 2/19 (4 overs)		Bharat Chipli 48 (40); Iqbal Abdullah 3/24 (4 overs)

Kolkata won by 9 runs
Eden Gardens, Kolkata
Umpires: Rudi Koertzen (SA) and Shavir Tarapore (Ind)
Player of the match: Jacques Kallis (Kolkata)

- Kolkata Knight Riders won the toss and elected to bat.

12 April 2011
16:00
Scorecard

Delhi Daredevils; 151/6 (20 overs)	v	Rajasthan Royals (H); 152/4 (18.3 overs)
Venugopal Rao 60 (40); Shane Warne 2/17 (4 overs)		Johan Botha 39* (32); Morné Morkel 1/11 (4 overs)

Rajasthan won by 6 wickets
Sawai Mansingh Stadium, Jaipur
Umpires: Aleem Dar (Pak) and Russell Tiffin (Zim)
Player of the match: Shane Warne (Rajasthan)

- Delhi Daredevils won the toss and elected to bat.

12 April 2011
20:00 (D/N)
Scorecard

(H) Royal Challengers Bangalore; 140/4 (20 overs)	v	Mumbai Indians; 143/1 (18.3 overs)
Tillakaratne Dilshan 59* (52); Kieron Pollard 2/25 (4 overs)		Ambati Rayudu 63* (50); Dirk Nannes 1/0 (1 over)

Mumbai won by 9 wickets
M. Chinnaswamy Stadium, Bangalore
Umpires: Kumar Dharmasena (SL) and Tony Hill (NZ)
Player of the match: Sachin Tendulkar (Mumbai)

- Mumbai Indians won the toss and elected to field.

13 April 2011
16:00
Scorecard

Chennai Super Kings; 188/4 (20 overs)	v	Kings XI Punjab (H); 193/4 (19.1 overs)
Murali Vijay 74 (43); Praveen Kumar 2/37 (4 overs)		Paul Valthaty 120* (63); Suraj Randiv 1/32 (4 overs)

Punjab won by 6 wickets
Punjab Cricket Association Stadium, Mohali, Chandigarh
Umpires: Asad Rauf (Pak) and Suresh Shastri (Ind)
Player of the match: Paul Valthaty (Punjab)

- Kings XI Punjab won the toss and elected to field.

13 April 2011
20:00 (D/N)
Scorecard

Kochi Tuskers Kerala; 148/8 (20 overs)	v	Pune Warriors India (H); 151/6 (18.5 overs)
Ravindra Jadeja 47 (33); Wayne Parnell 3/35 (4 overs)		Mohnish Mishra 37* (21); Brad Hodge 2/14 (2 overs)

Pune won by 4 wickets
DY Patil Stadium, Navi Mumbai
Umpires: Sudhir Asnani (Ind) and Paul Reiffel (Aus)
Player of the match: Mohnish Mishra (Pune)

- Kochi Tuskers Kerala won the toss and elected to bat.

14 April 2011
20:00 (D/N)
Scorecard

(H) Deccan Chargers; 175/5 (20 overs)	v	Royal Challengers Bangalore; 142/9 (20 overs)
Bharat Chipli 61* (35); Zaheer Khan 3/32 (4 overs)		Virat Kohli 71 (51); Dale Steyn 3/24 (4 overs)

Deccan won by 33 runs
Rajiv Gandhi International Cricket Stadium, Hyderabad
Umpires: Rudi Koertzen (SA) and S. Ravi (Ind)
Player of the match: Dale Steyn (Deccan)

- Royal Challengers Bangalore won the toss and elected to field.

15 April 2011
16:00
Scorecard

(H) Rajasthan Royals; 159/4 (20 overs)	v	Kolkata Knight Riders; 160/1 (18.3 overs)
Ross Taylor 35* (25); Yusuf Pathan 2/4 (1 over)		Jacques Kallis 80* (65)

Kolkata won by 9 wickets
Sawai Mansingh Stadium, Jaipur
Umpires: Aleem Dar (Pak) and Sanjay Hazare (Ind)
Player of the match: Gautam Gambhir (Kolkata)

- Kolkata Knight Riders won the toss and elected to field.

15 April 2011
20:00 (D/N)
Scorecard

(H) Mumbai Indians; 182/2 (20 overs)	v	Kochi Tuskers Kerala; 184/2 (19 overs)
Sachin Tendulkar 100* (66); Raiphi Gomez 1/29 (3 overs)		Brendon McCullum 81 (60); Lasith Malinga 2/42 (4 overs)

Kochi won by 8 wickets
Wankhede Stadium, Mumbai
Umpires: Billy Doctrove (WI) and Paul Reiffel (Aus)
Player of the match: Brendon McCullum (Kochi)

- Kochi Tuskers Kerala won the toss and elected to field.

16 April 2011
16:00
Scorecard

(H) Chennai Super Kings; 183/5 (20 overs)	v	Royal Challengers Bangalore; 162/7 (20 overs)
Michael Hussey 83* (56); Ryan Ninan 2/31 (3 overs)		AB de Villiers 64 (44); Suraj Randiv 2/24 (4 overs)

Chennai won by 21 runs
M. A. Chidambaram Stadium, Chennai
Umpires: Kumar Dharmasena (SL) and Tony Hill (NZ)
Player of the match: Michael Hussey (Chennai)

- Chennai Super Kings won the toss and elected to bat.

16 April 2011
20:00 (D/N)
Scorecard

(H) Deccan Chargers; 165/8 (20 overs)	v	Kings XI Punjab; 166/2 (17.4 overs)
Shikhar Dhawan 45 (36); Paul Valthaty 4/29 (4 overs)		Paul Valthaty 75 (47); Amit Mishra 2/28 (4 overs)

Punjab won by 8 wickets
Rajiv Gandhi International Cricket Stadium, Hyderabad
Umpires: Rudi Koertzen (SA) and S. Ravi (Ind)
Player of the match: Paul Valthaty (Punjab)

- Kings XI Punjab won the toss and elected to field.

17 April 2011
16:00
Scorecard

(H) Pune Warriors India; 187/5 (20 overs)	v	Delhi Daredevils; 190/7 (19.2 overs)
Yuvraj Singh 66* (32); Shahbaz Nadeem 2/39 (4 overs)		David Warner 46 (28); Yuvraj Singh 4/29 (4 overs)

Delhi won by 3 wickets
DY Patil Stadium, Navi Mumbai
Umpires: Asad Rauf (Pak) and Amiesh Saheba (Ind)
Player of the match: Yuvraj Singh (Pune)

- Delhi Daredevils won the toss and elected to field.

17 April 2011
20:00 (D/N)
Scorecard

Rajasthan Royals; 81 (15.2 overs)	v	Kolkata Knight Riders (H); 85/2 (13.5 overs)
Ashok Menaria 21 (17); Lakshmipathy Balaji 3/15 (3 overs)		Gautam Gambhir 35* (35); Shane Warne 1/17 (4 overs)

Kolkata won by 8 wickets
Eden Gardens, Kolkata
Umpires: Aleem Dar (Pak) and Russell Tiffin (Zim)
Player of the match: Lakshmipathy Balaji (Kolkata)

- Kolkata Knight Riders won the toss and elected to field.

18 April 2011
20:00 (D/N)
Scorecard

Chennai Super Kings; 131/4 (17 overs)	v	Kochi Tuskers Kerala (H); 135/3 (15 overs)
Suresh Raina 50 (40); Raiphi Gomez 1/20 (2 overs)		Brendon McCullum 47 (33); Ravichandran Ashwin 2/31 (4 overs)

Kochi won by 7 wickets (D/L)
Jawaharlal Nehru Stadium, Kochi
Umpires: Krishna Hariharan (Ind) and Tony Hill (NZ)
Player of the match: Brendon McCullum (Kochi)

- Kochi Tuskers Kerala won the toss and elected to field.
- Match reduced to 17 overs per side due to rain; Kochi target was adjusted to 135 runs from 17 overs via the Duckworth–Lewis method.

19 April 2011
16:00
Scorecard

Deccan Chargers; 168/4 (20 overs)	v	Delhi Daredevils (H); 152/7 (20 overs)
Sunny Sohal 62 (41); Shahbaz Nadeem 1/24 (3 overs)		David Warner 51 (48); Harmeet Singh 2/27 (4 overs)

Deccan won by 16 runs
Feroz Shah Kotla, Delhi
Umpires: Paul Reiffel and Rod Tucker (both Aus)
Player of the match: Sunny Sohal (Deccan)

- Deccan Chargers won the toss and elected to bat.

19 April 2011
20:00 (D/N)
Scorecard

(H) Royal Challengers Bangalore	v	Rajasthan Royals

No result
M. Chinnaswamy Stadium, Bangalore
Umpires: Billy Doctrove (WI) and Rudi Koertzen (SA)

- Rajasthan Royals won the toss and elected to field.
- Match abandoned without a ball bowled due to rain.

20 April 2011
16:00
Scorecard

Pune Warriors India; 118 (17.2 overs)	v	Mumbai Indians (H); 124/3 (20 overs)
Robin Uthappa 45 (37); Munaf Patel 3/8 (2.2 overs)		Ambati Rayudu 37 (40); Shrikant Wagh 1/9 (2 overs)

Mumbai won by 7 wickets
Wankhede Stadium, Mumbai
Umpires: Asad Rauf (Pak) and Amiesh Saheba (Ind)
Player of the match: Munaf Patel (Mumbai)

- Pune Warriors India won the toss and elected to bat.

20 April 2011
20:00 (D/N)
Scorecard

Kochi Tuskers Kerala; 132/7 (20 overs)	v	Kolkata Knight Riders (H); 126/9 (20 overs)
Ravindra Jadeja 29 (18); Yusuf Pathan 3/20 (4 overs)		Manoj Tiwary 46 (51); R. P. Singh 2/25 (4 overs); Ravindra Jadeja 2/25 (4 overs)

Kochi won by 6 runs
Eden Gardens, Kolkata
Umpires: Aleem Dar (Pak) and Russell Tiffin (Zim)
Player of the match: Mahela Jayawardene (Kochi)

- Kolkata Knight Riders won the toss and elected to field.

21 April 2011
20:00 (D/N)
Scorecard

(H) Kings XI Punjab; 195/7 (20 overs)	v	Rajasthan Royals; 147/7 (20 overs)
Shaun Marsh 71 (42); Shaun Tait 3/22 (4 overs)		Ashok Menaria 34 (26); Bhargav Bhatt 2/20 (3 overs)

Punjab won by 48 runs
Punjab Cricket Association Stadium, Mohali, Chandigarh
Umpires: Sudhir Asnani (Ind) and Paul Reiffel (Aus)
Player of the match: Shaun Marsh (Punjab)

- Rajasthan Royals won the toss and elected to field.

22 April 2011
16:00
Scorecard

(H) Kolkata Knight Riders; 171/5 (20 overs)	v	Royal Challengers Bangalore; 175/1 (18.1 overs)
Gautam Gambhir 48 (38); Sreenath Aravind 2/37 (3 overs)		Chris Gayle 102* (55); Lakshmipathy Balaji 1/43 (4 overs)

Bangalore won by 9 wickets
Eden Gardens, Kolkata
Umpires: Sanjay Hazare (Ind) and Russell Tiffin (Zim)
Player of the match: Chris Gayle (Bangalore)

- Royal Challengers Bangalore won the toss and elected to field.

22 April 2011
20:00 (D/N)
Scorecard

(H) Mumbai Indians; 164/4 (20 overs)	v	Chennai Super Kings; 156/9 (20 overs)
Rohit Sharma 87 (48); Doug Bollinger 2/30 (4 overs)		Subramaniam Badrinath 71* (48); Harbhajan Singh 5/18 (4 overs)

Mumbai won by 8 runs
Wankhede Stadium, Mumbai
Umpires: Asad Rauf (Pak) and Amiesh Saheba (Ind)
Player of the match: Harbhajan Singh (Mumbai)

- Chennai Super Kings won the toss and elected to field.

23 April 2011
20:00 (D/N)
Scorecard

(H) Delhi Daredevils; 231/4 (20 overs)	v	Kings XI Punjab; 202/6 (20 overs)
Virender Sehwag 77 (35); David Hussey 1/19 (1 over)		Shaun Marsh 95 (46); Ajit Agarkar 2/47 (4 overs)

Delhi won by 29 runs
Feroz Shah Kotla, Delhi
Umpires: Sudhir Asnani (Ind) and Rudi Koertzen (SA)
Player of the match: David Warner (Delhi)

- Kings XI Punjab won the toss and elected to field.

24 April 2011
16:00
Scorecard

Mumbai Indians; 172/4 (20 overs)	v	Deccan Chargers (H); 135/8 (20 overs)
Rohit Sharma 56* (34); Amit Mishra 2/14 (4 overs)		Kumar Sangakkara 34 (28); Lasith Malinga 3/9 (4 overs)

Mumbai won by 37 runs
Rajiv Gandhi International Cricket Stadium, Hyderabad
Umpires: Kumar Dharmasena (SL) and Tony Hill (NZ)
Player of the match: Lasith Malinga (Mumbai)

- Deccan Chargers won the toss and elected to field.

24 April 2011
20:00 (D/N)
Scorecard

Kochi Tuskers Kerala; 109 (20 overs)	v	Rajasthan Royals (H); 111/2 (14.1 overs)
Parthiv Patel 32 (34); Shane Warne 3/16 (4 overs)		Shane Watson 49 (40); Ravindra Jadeja 1/24 (3 overs)

Rajasthan won by 8 wickets
Sawai Mansingh Stadium, Jaipur
Umpires: Billy Doctrove (WI) and Shavir Tarapore (Ind)
Player of the match: Shane Warne (Rajasthan)

- Rajasthan Royals won the toss and elected to field.

25 April 2011
20:00 (D/N)
Scorecard

(H) Chennai Super Kings; 142/6 (20 overs)	v	Pune Warriors India; 117/9 (20 overs)
Michael Hussey 61 (48); Jerome Taylor 3/30 (4 overs)		Yuvraj Singh 34 (43); Albie Morkel 3/29 (4 overs)

Chennai won by 25 runs
M. A. Chidambaram Stadium, Chennai
Umpires: Aleem Dar (Pak) and Russell Tiffin (Zim)
Player of the match: Michael Hussey (Chennai)

- Pune Warriors India won the toss and elected to field.

26 April 2011
20:00 (D/N)
Scorecard

(H) Delhi Daredevils; 160/6 (20 overs)	v	Royal Challengers Bangalore; 161/7 (19.3 overs)
James Hopes 54 (43); Abhimanyu Mithun 2/37 (4 overs)		Virat Kohli 56 (38); Morné Morkel 3/25 (4 overs)

Bangalore won by 3 wickets
Feroz Shah Kotla, Delhi
Umpires: Sudhir Asnani (Ind) and Rod Tucker (Aus)
Player of the match: Virat Kohli (Bangalore)

- Royal Challengers Bangalore won the toss and elected to field.

27 April 2011
16:00
Scorecard

(H) Pune Warriors India; 141/6 (20 overs)	v	Chennai Super Kings; 145/2 (19.3 overs)
Yuvraj Singh 62* (43); Doug Bollinger 3/21 (4 overs)		Subramaniam Badrinath 63* (44); Jesse Ryder 1/21 (2 overs)

Chennai won by 8 wickets
DY Patil Stadium, Navi Mumbai
Umpires: Asad Rauf (Pak) and Suresh Shastri (Ind)
Player of the match: Doug Bollinger (Chennai)

- Pune Warriors India won the toss and elected to bat.

27 April 2011
20:00 (D/N)
Scorecard

Deccan Chargers; 129/6 (20 overs)	v	Kochi Tuskers Kerala (H); 74 (16.3 overs)
Kumar Sangakkara 65 (47); Vinay Kumar 3/25 (4 overs)		Ravindra Jadeja 23 (35); Ishant Sharma 5/12 (3 overs)

Deccan won by 55 runs
Jawaharlal Nehru Stadium, Kochi
Umpires: Kumar Dharmasena (SL) and Tony Hill (NZ)
Player of the match: Ishant Sharma (Deccan)

- Kochi Tuskers Kerala won the toss and elected to field.

28 April 2011
20:00 (D/N)
Scorecard

Kolkata Knight Riders; 148/7 (20 overs)	v	Delhi Daredevils (H); 131/9 (20 overs)
Manoj Tiwary 61* (47); Umesh Yadav 2/29 (4 overs)		Virender Sehwag 34 (23); Iqbal Abdullah 3/25 (4 overs)

Kolkata won by 17 runs
Feroz Shah Kotla, Delhi
Umpires: Paul Reiffel (Aus) and Rod Tucker (Aus)
Player of the match: Manoj Tiwary (Kolkata)

- Delhi Daredevils won the toss and elected to field.

29 April 2011
16:00
Scorecard

Mumbai Indians; 94/8 (20 overs)	v	Rajasthan Royals (H); 95/3 (18.1 overs)
Andrew Symonds 17 (26); Johan Botha 3/6 (2 overs)		Johan Botha 45 (39); Munaf Patel 2/18 (4 overs)

Rajasthan won by 7 wickets
Sawai Mansingh Stadium, Jaipur
Umpires: Asad Rauf (Pak) and Shavir Tarapore (Ind)
Player of the match: Johan Botha (Rajasthan)

- Rajasthan Royals won the toss and elected to field.

29 April 2011
20:00 (D/N)
Scorecard

(H) Royal Challengers Bangalore; 181/5 (20 overs)	v	Pune Warriors India; 155/5 (20 overs)
Virat Kohli 67 (42); Alfonso Thomas 2/23 (4 overs)		Jesse Ryder 51 (34); Chris Gayle 1/8 (2 overs)

Bangalore won by 26 runs
M. Chinnaswamy Stadium, Bangalore
Umpires: Aleem Dar (Pak) and Sanjay Hazare (Ind)
Player of the match: Virat Kohli (Bangalore)

- Pune Warriors India won the toss and elected to field.

30 April 2011
16:00
Scorecard

Delhi Daredevils; 157/7 (20 overs)	v	Kochi Tuskers Kerala (H); 119 (18.5 overs)
Virender Sehwag 80 (47); Sreesanth 2/10 (4 overs)		Ravindra Jadeja 31 (22); Morné Morkel 3/18 (4 overs)

Delhi won by 38 runs
Jawaharlal Nehru Stadium, Kochi
Umpires: Kumar Dharmasena (SL) and Tony Hill (NZ)
Player of the match: Virender Sehwag (Delhi)

- Delhi Daredevils won the toss and elected to bat.

30 April 2011
20:00 (D/N)
Scorecard

Kings XI Punjab; 119/6 (20 overs)	v	Kolkata Knight Riders (H); 120/2 (17.2 overs)
Dinesh Karthik 42 (42); Iqbal Abdullah 2/19 (4 overs)		Gautam Gambhir 45* (44); Bhargav Bhatt 2/22 (4 overs)

Kolkata won by 8 wickets
Eden Gardens, Kolkata
Umpires: Amiesh Saheba (Ind) and Suresh Shastri (Ind)
Player of the match: Iqbal Abdullah (Kolkata)

- Kolkata Knight Riders won the toss and elected to field.

1 May 2011
16:00
Scorecard

Pune Warriors India; 143/7 (20 overs)	v	Rajasthan Royals (H); 144/4 (19.3 overs)
Robin Uthappa 35 (21); Siddharth Trivedi 2/28 (4 overs)		Ross Taylor 47* (35); Rahul Sharma 3/13 (4 overs)

Rajasthan won by 6 wickets
Sawai Mansingh Stadium, Jaipur
Umpires: Shavir Tarapore (Ind) and Simon Taufel (Aus)
Player of the match: Ross Taylor (Rajasthan)

- Rajasthan Royals won the toss and elected to field.

1 May 2011
20:00 (D/N)
Scorecard

(H) Chennai Super Kings; 165/5 (20 overs)	v	Deccan Chargers; 146/8 (20 overs)
Suresh Raina 59 (35); Pragyan Ojha 3/26 (4 overs)		Sunny Sohal 56 (30); Albie Morkel 3/38 (4 overs)

Chennai won by 19 runs
M. A. Chidambaram Stadium, Chennai
Umpires: Aleem Dar (Pak) and Russell Tiffin (Zim)
Player of the match: Albie Morkel (Chennai)

- Chennai Super Kings won the toss and elected to bat.

2 May 2011
16:00
Scorecard

(H) Mumbai Indians; 159/5 (20 overs)	v	Kings XI Punjab; 136/8 (20 overs)
Ambati Rayudu 51 (37); Ryan Harris 2/33 (4 overs)		Shaun Marsh 61 (47); Munaf Patel 2/18 (4 overs)

Mumbai won by 23 runs
Wankhede Stadium, Mumbai
Umpires: Kumar Dharmasena (SL) and Paul Reiffel (Aus)
Player of the match: Kieron Pollard (Mumbai)

- Kings XI Punjab won the toss and elected to field.

2 May 2011
20:00 (D/N)
Scorecard

(H) Delhi Daredevils; 140/6 (20 overs)	v	Kochi Tuskers Kerala; 141/3 (15 overs)
Yalaka Venugopal Rao 40 (36); Vinay Kumar 2/25 (4 overs)		Brendon McCullum 37 (19); Roelof van der Merwe 1/15 (3 overs)

Kochi won by 7 wickets
Feroz Shah Kotla, Delhi
Umpires: Asad Rauf (Pak) and Suresh Shastri (Ind)
Player of the match: Prasanth Parameswaran (Kochi)

- Kochi Tuskers Kerala won the toss and elected to field.

3 May 2011
20:00 (D/N)
Scorecard

Kolkata Knight Riders; 169/4 (20 overs)	v	Deccan Chargers (H); 149/6 (20 overs)
Yusuf Pathan 47* (26); Amit Mishra 1/22 (3 overs)		Shikhar Dhawan 54 (45); Rajat Bhatia 2/26 (4 overs)

Kolkata won by 20 runs
Rajiv Gandhi International Cricket Stadium, Hyderabad
Umpires: Sudhir Asnani (Ind) and Rod Tucker (Aus)
Player of the match: Yusuf Pathan (Kolkata)

- Deccan Chargers won the toss and elected to field.

4 May 2011
16:00
Scorecard

Rajasthan Royals; 147/6 (20 overs)	v	Chennai Super Kings (H); 149/2 (18.4 overs)
Rahul Dravid 66 (51); Shadab Jakati 2/22 (4 overs)		Michael Hussey 79* (55); Johan Botha 1/22 (4 overs)

Chennai won by 8 wickets
M. A. Chidambaram Stadium, Chennai
Umpires: Sanjay Hazare (Ind) and Russell Tiffin (Zim)
Player of the match: Michael Hussey (Chennai)

- Rajasthan Royals won the toss and elected to bat.

4 May 2011
20:00 (D/N)
Scorecard

Mumbai Indians; 160/7 (20 overs)	v	Pune Warriors India (H); 139/7 (20 overs)
Tirumalasetti Suman 36 (16); Rahul Sharma 2/7 (4 overs)		Manish Pandey 59 (47); Lasith Malinga 3/25 (4 overs)

Mumbai won by 21 runs
DY Patil Stadium, Navi Mumbai
Umpires: Kumar Dharmasena (SL) and Simon Taufel (Aus)
Player of the match: Rahul Sharma (Pune)

- Pune Warriors India won the toss and elected to field.

5 May 2011
16:00
Scorecard

(H) Kochi Tuskers Kerala; 156/5 (20 overs)	v	Kolkata Knight Riders; 139/7 (20 overs)
Mahela Jayawardene 55 (41); Jaidev Unadkat 2/25 (4 overs)		Eoin Morgan 66 (51); Raiphi Gomez 2/14 (4 overs)

Kochi won by 17 runs
Jawaharlal Nehru Stadium, Kochi
Umpires: Rod Tucker (Aus) and S. Ravi (Ind)
Player of the match: Brad Hodge (Kochi)

- Kolkata Knight Riders won the toss and elected to field.

5 May 2011
20:00 (D/N)
Scorecard

(H) Deccan Chargers; 175/5 (20 overs)	v	Delhi Daredevils; 179/6 (19 overs)
JP Duminy 55 (31); Ajit Agarkar 2/29 (4 overs)		Virender Sehwag 119 (56); Ishant Sharma 2/16 (4 overs)

Delhi won by 4 wickets
Rajiv Gandhi International Cricket Stadium, Hyderabad
Umpires: Asad Rauf (Pak) and Amiesh Saheba (Ind)
Player of the match: Virender Sehwag (Delhi)

- Delhi Daredevils won the toss and elected to field.

6 May 2011
20:00 (D/N)
Scorecard

(H) Royal Challengers Bangalore; 205/6 (20 overs)	v	Kings XI Punjab; 120/9 (20 overs)
Chris Gayle 107 (49); Ryan Harris 3/38 (4 overs)		Ryan McLaren 28 (32); Sreenath Aravind 4/14 (4 overs)

Bangalore won by 85 runs
M. Chinnaswamy Stadium, Bangalore
Umpires: Aleem Dar (Pak) and Russell Tiffin (Zim)
Player of the match: Chris Gayle (Bangalore)

- Kings XI Punjab won the toss and elected to field.

7 May 2011
16:00
Scorecard

Chennai Super Kings; 114/4 (20 overs)	v	Kolkata Knight Riders (H); 61/2 (10 overs)
Subramaniam Badrinath 54 (41); Iqbal Abdullah 1/15 (4 overs)		Jacques Kallis 21* (23); Ravichandran Ashwin 2/12 (3 overs)

Kolkata won by 10 runs (D/L)
Eden Gardens, Kolkata
Umpires: Asad Rauf (Pak) and Paul Reiffel (Aus)
Player of the match: Iqbal Abdullah (Kolkata)

- Chennai Super Kings won the toss and elected to bat.
- Kolkata's innings was curtailed by rain after 10 overs, where their target was 52 runs from 10 overs via the Duckworth–Lewis method.

7 May 2011
20:00 (D/N)
Scorecard

(H) Mumbai Indians; 178/4 (20 overs)	v	Delhi Daredevils; 146 (19.5 overs)
Ambati Rayudu 59 (39); Irfan Pathan 1/23 (4 overs)		James Hopes 55 (44); Lasith Malinga 2/18 (3.2 overs)

Mumbai won by 32 runs
Wankhede Stadium, Mumbai
Umpires: Krishna Hariharan (Ind) and Simon Taufel (Aus)
Player of the match: Ambati Rayudu (Mumbai)

- Delhi Daredevils won the toss and elected to field.

8 May 2011
16:00
Scorecard

Kochi Tuskers Kerala; 125/9 (20 overs)	v	Royal Challengers Bangalore (H); 128/1 (13.1 overs)
Michael Klinger 24 (25); Sreenath Aravind 2/20 (4 overs)		Tillakaratne Dilshan 52* (31); Vinay Kumar 1/18 (3 overs)

Bangalore won by 9 wickets
M. Chinnaswamy Stadium, Bangalore
Umpires: Aleem Dar (Pak) and Sanjay Hazare (Ind)
Player of the match: Chris Gayle (Bangalore)

- Kochi Tuskers Kerala won the toss and elected to bat.

8 May 2011
20:00 (D/N)
Scorecard

(H) Kings XI Punjab; 119/8 (20 overs)	v	Pune Warriors India; 120/5 (17.1 overs)
Shaun Marsh 32 (28); Wayne Parnell 2/12 (4 overs)		Yuvraj Singh 35 (15); Shalabh Srivastava 2/20 (3 overs)

Pune won by 5 wickets
Punjab Cricket Association Stadium, Mohali, Chandigarh
Umpires: Shavir Tarapore (Ind) and Rod Tucker (Aus)
Player of the match: Rahul Sharma (Pune)

- Kings XI Punjab won the toss and elected to bat.

9 May 2011
20:00 (D/N)
Scorecard

Chennai Super Kings; 196/3 (20 overs)	v	Rajasthan Royals (H); 133 (19.3 overs)
Murali Vijay 53 (40); Johan Botha 1/23 (4 overs)		Ajinkya Rahane 52 (36); Doug Bollinger 3/22 (4 overs)

Chennai won by 63 runs
Sawai Mansingh Stadium, Jaipur
Umpires: Krishna Hariharan (Ind) and Simon Taufel (Aus)
Player of the match: Murali Vijay (Chennai)

- Rajasthan Royals won the toss and elected to field.

10 May 2011
16:00
Scorecard

(H) Deccan Chargers; 136/8 (20 overs)	v	Pune Warriors India; 137/4 (18.2 overs)
Dwaraka Ravi Teja 30 (27); Mitchell Marsh 4/25 (4 overs)		Manish Pandey 49 (42); Daniel Christian 2/21 (3 overs)

Pune won by 6 wickets
Rajiv Gandhi International Cricket Stadium, Hyderabad
Umpires: Asad Rauf (Pak) and Amiesh Saheba (Ind)
Player of the match: Mitchell Marsh (Pune)

- Deccan Chargers won the toss and elected to bat.
- Deccan Chargers were eliminated as a result of the match.

10 May 2011
20:00 (D/N)
Scorecard

(H) Kings XI Punjab; 163/8 (20 overs)	v	Mumbai Indians; 87 (12.5 overs)
Shaun Marsh 43 (34); Munaf Patel 5/21 (4 overs)		Kieron Pollard 17 (11); Bhargav Bhatt 4/22 (2.5 overs)

Punjab won by 76 runs
Punjab Cricket Association Stadium, Mohali, Chandigarh
Umpires: Shavir Tarapore (Ind) and Rod Tucker (Aus)
Player of the match: Bhargav Bhatt (Punjab)

- Mumbai Indians won the toss and elected to field.

11 May 2011
20:00 (D/N)
Scorecard

(H) Rajasthan Royals; 146/6 (20 overs)	v	Royal Challengers Bangalore; 151/1 (17 overs)
Rahul Dravid 37 (31); Sreenath Aravind 3/34 (4 overs)		Chris Gayle 70* (44); Shane Warne 1/26 (4 overs)

Bangalore won by 9 wickets
Sawai Mansingh Stadium, Jaipur
Umpires: Kumar Dharmasena (SL) and Krishna Hariharan (Ind)
Player of the match: Sreenath Aravind (Bangalore)

- Royal Challengers Bangalore won the toss and elected to field.

12 May 2011
20:00 (D/N)
Scorecard

(H) Chennai Super Kings; 176/4 (20 overs)	v	Delhi Daredevils; 158/6 (20 overs)
MS Dhoni 63* (31); Varun Aaron 1/20 (4 overs)		Irfan Pathan 44* (34); Ravichandran Ashwin 2/19 (4 overs)

Chennai won by 18 runs
M. A. Chidambaram Stadium, Chennai
Umpires: Amiesh Saheba (Ind) and Suresh Shastri (Ind)
Player of the match: MS Dhoni (Chennai)

- Chennai Super Kings won the toss and elected to bat.
- Delhi Daredevils were eliminated as a result of this match.

13 May 2011
20:00 (D/N)
Scorecard

(H) Kochi Tuskers Kerala; 178/7 (20 overs)	v	Kings XI Punjab; 181/4 (18.5 overs)
Mahela Jayawardene 76 (52); Bipul Sharma 2/32 (4 overs)		Dinesh Karthik 69 (33); R. P. Singh 4/25 (4 overs)

Punjab won by 6 wickets
Holkar Cricket Stadium, Indore
Umpires: Sudhir Asnani (Ind) and Rod Tucker (Aus)
Player of the match: Dinesh Karthik (Punjab)

- Kings XI Punjab won the toss and elected to field.

14 May 2011
16:00
Scorecard

Kolkata Knight Riders; 89/4 (13 overs)	v	Royal Challengers Bangalore (H); 105/6 (12.3 overs)
Yusuf Pathan 36 (24); Charl Langeveldt 2/10 (3 overs)		Chris Gayle 38 (12); Jacques Kallis 2/16 (3 overs)

Bangalore won by 4 wickets (D/L)
M. Chinnaswamy Stadium, Bangalore
Umpires: Rudi Koertzen (SA) and Russell Tiffin (Zim)
Player of the match: Chris Gayle (Bangalore)

- Royal Challengers Bangalore won the toss and elected to field.
- Kolkata's innings was interrupted by rain after 11 overs, reducing their innings to 13 overs. Bangalore's target was adjusted to 102 runs from 13 overs via the Duckworth–Lewis method.
- Royal Challengers Bangalore qualified for the playoffs as a result of this match.

14 May 2011
20:00 (D/N)
Scorecard

Deccan Chargers; 135/6 (20 overs)	v	Mumbai Indians (H); 125/8 (20 overs)
Shikhar Dhawan 27* (18); Dhawal Kulkarni 3/26 (4 overs)		Sachin Tendulkar 37 (42); Anand Rajan 3/27 (3 overs)

Deccan won by 10 runs
Wankhede Stadium, Mumbai
Umpires: Shavir Tarapore (Ind) and S. Ravi (Ind)
Player of the match: Amit Mishra (Deccan)

- Deccan Chargers won the toss and elected to bat.

15 May 2011
20:00 (D/N)
Scorecard

(H) Kings XI Punjab; 170/6 (20 overs)	v	Delhi Daredevils; 141/8 (20 overs)
Paul Valthaty 62 (50); Irfan Pathan 3/28 (4 overs)		David Warner 29 (29); Piyush Chawla 3/16 (4 overs)

Punjab won by 29 runs
HPCA Stadium, Dharamsala
Umpires: Asad Rauf (Pak) and Suresh Shastri (Ind)
Player of the match: Piyush Chawla (Punjab)

- Delhi Daredevils won the toss and elected to field.

15 May 2011
20:00 (D/N)
Scorecard

Rajasthan Royals; 97 (18.3 overs)	v	Kochi Tuskers Kerala (H); 98/2 (7.2 overs)
Ashok Menaria 31 (28); Brad Hodge 4/13 (4 overs)		Brad Hodge 33* (17); Nayan Doshi 1/15 (1.2 overs)

Kochi won by 8 wickets
Holkar Cricket Stadium, Indore
Umpires: Paul Reiffel and Rod Tucker (both Aus)
Player of the match: Brad Hodge (Kochi)

- Kochi Tuskers Kerala won the toss and elected to field.
- Rajasthan Royals were eliminated as a result of this match.

16 May 2011
20:00 (D/N)
Scorecard

(H) Pune Warriors India; 136/9 (20 overs)	v	Deccan Chargers; 138/4 (19.2 overs)
Mitchell Marsh 37 (28); Daniel Christian 2/13 (3 overs)		Sunny Sohal 34 (28); Rahul Sharma 2/25 (4 overs)

Deccan won by 6 wickets
DY Patil Stadium, Navi Mumbai
Umpires: Shavir Tarapore (Ind) and S. Ravi (both Ind)
Player of the match: Amit Mishra (Deccan)

- Deccan Chargers won the toss and elected to field.
- Pune Warriors India were eliminated as a result of this match.

17 May 2011
20:00 (D/N)
Scorecard

(H) Kings XI Punjab; 232/2 (20 overs)	v	Royal Challengers Bangalore; 121 (17 overs)
Adam Gilchrist 106 (55); Charl Langeveldt 2/48 (4 overs)		AB de Villiers 34 (27); Piyush Chawla 4/17 (4 overs)

Punjab won by 111 runs
HPCA Stadium, Dharamsala
Umpires: Asad Rauf (Pak) and Amiesh Saheba (Ind)
Player of the match: Adam Gilchrist (Punjab)

- Kings XI Punjab won the toss and elected to bat.

18 May 2011
20:00 (D/N)
Scorecard

(H) Chennai Super Kings; 152/5 (20 overs)	v	Kochi Tuskers Kerala; 141/5 (20 overs)
Wriddhiman Saha 46* (33); Ravindra Jadeja 2/26 (4 overs)		Brad Hodge 51* (42); Ravichandran Ashwin 1/16 (4 overs)

Chennai won by 11 runs
M. A. Chidambaram Stadium, Chennai
Umpires: Kumar Dharmasena (SL) and Rudi Koertzen (SA)
Player of the match: Wriddhiman Saha (Chennai)

- Chennai Super Kings won the toss and elected to bat.
- Chennai Super Kings qualified for the playoffs, and Kochi Tuskers Kerala were eliminated as a result of this match.

19 May 2011
20:00 (D/N)
Scorecard

(H) Pune Warriors India; 118/7 (20 overs)	v	Kolkata Knight Riders; 119/3 (16.4 overs)
Yuvraj Singh 24 (26); Lakshmipathy Balaji 2/7 (1 over)		Gautam Gambhir 54* (46); Bhuvneshwar Kumar 1/19 (3 overs)

Kolkata won by 7 wickets
DY Patil Stadium, Navi Mumbai
Umpires: Simon Taufel (Aus) and S. Ravi (Ind)
Player of the match: Yusuf Pathan (Kolkata)

- Kolkata Knight Riders won the toss and elected to field.

20 May 2011
20:00 (D/N)
Scorecard

(H) Mumbai Indians; 133/5 (20 overs)	v	Rajasthan Royals; 134/0 (13.1 overs)
Rohit Sharma 58 (47); Shane Watson 3/19 (4 overs)		Shane Watson 89* (47)

Rajasthan won by 10 wickets
Wankhede Stadium, Mumbai
Umpires: Paul Reiffel (Aus) and Rudi Koertzen (SA)
Player of the match: Shane Watson (Rajasthan)

- Mumbai Indians won the toss and elected to bat.

21 May 2011
16:00
Scorecard

Deccan Chargers; 198/2 (20 overs)	v	Kings XI Punjab (H); 116 (19 overs)
Shikhar Dhawan 95* (57); Paul Valthaty 1/24 (4 overs)		Adam Gilchrist 51 (37); Amit Mishra 4/9 (4 overs)

Deccan won by 82 runs
HPCA Stadium, Dharamsala
Umpires: Asad Rauf (Pak) and Amiesh Saheba (Ind)
Player of the match: Shikhar Dhawan (Deccan)

- Kings XI Punjab won the toss and elected to field.
- Kolkata Knight Riders and Mumbai Indians qualified for playoffs, and Kings XI Punjab were eliminated as a result of this match.
- Amit Mishra (Deccan Chargers) took his second hat-trick.

21 May 2011
20:00 (D/N)
Scorecard

(H) Delhi Daredevils; 56/3 (10.1 overs)	v	Pune Warriors India
David Warner 19 (10); Shrikant Mundhe 1/6 (1 over)

No result
Feroz Shah Kotla, Delhi
Umpires: Rod Tucker (Aus) and Sanjay Hazare (Ind)

- Delhi Daredevils won the toss and elected to bat.
- Match abandoned due to rain.

22 May 2011
16:00
Scorecard

Chennai Super Kings; 128/8 (20 overs)	v	Royal Challengers Bangalore (H); 129/2 (18 overs)
MS Dhoni 70* (40); Daniel Vettori 2/15 (4 overs)		Chris Gayle 75* (50); Albie Morkel 1/16 (2 overs)

Bangalore won by 8 wickets
M. Chinnaswamy Stadium, Bangalore
Umpires: Rudi Koertzen (SA) and Krishna Hariharan (Ind)
Player of the match: Chris Gayle (Bangalore)

- Royal Challengers Bangalore won the toss and elected to field.
- Royal Challengers Bangalore advanced to Qualifier 1 as a result of this match.

22 May 2011
20:00 (D/N)
Scorecard

(H) Kolkata Knight Riders; 175/7 (20 overs)	v	Mumbai Indians; 178/5 (20 overs)
Jacques Kallis 59 (42); Abu Nechim 2/32 (4 overs)		James Franklin 45* (23); Rajat Bhatia 3/22 (4 overs)

Mumbai won by 5 wickets
Eden Gardens, Kolkata
Umpires: Shavir Tarapore (Ind) and Simon Taufel (Aus)
Player of the match: James Franklin (Mumbai)

- Mumbai Indians won the toss and elected to field.
- Chennai Super Kings advanced to Qualifier 1 as a result of this match.
