= List of Kochi Tuskers Kerala cricketers =

Kochi Tuskers Kerala (KTK) played fourteen matches in the 2011 Indian Premier League, with 20 players representing it in these matches. KTK was a franchise cricket team based in Kochi, Kerala, which was a part of the 2011 season of the Indian Premier League (IPL). The IPL is a professional league for Twenty20 (T20) cricket in India. The team was one of two new franchises added to the IPL, alongside the Pune Warriors India; however it was terminated by the Board of Control for Cricket in India (BCCI) for "breaching its terms of agreement". It was owned by Kochi Cricket Pvt Ltd., captained by Mahela Jayawardene, and coached by Geoff Lawson. Their first match was against Royal Challengers Bangalore, whereas their first win was against Mumbai Indians.

In total, KTK played fourteen IPL matches. Four KTK players took part in all fourteen matches: Brad Hodge, Parthiv Patel, Ravindra Jadeja, and R. P. Singh. Brendon McCullum, who has played in thirteen matches out of the team's 14 IPL fixtures, was the leading run-scorer with 357 runs. His score of 81, made against Mumbai Indians, was the highest total by an KTK batsman. Brad Hodge had the highest batting average, whereas Mahela Jayawardene scored the most number of half-centuries for KTK with three. RP Singh claimed more wickets than any other KTK player, having taken 13. The best bowling average was Brad Hodge's 11.00, though among bowlers who have bowled more than 20 overs, RP Singh had the best average: 26.53. Brad Hodge also has the best bowling figures in an innings; he claimed four wickets against Rajasthan Royals, while only conceding thirteen runs. Parthiv Patel tookn eight catches and has taken one stump as wicket-keeper for KTK. Mahela Jayawardene and RP Singh has claimed the highest number of catches among fielders, both taking six.

This list includes all players who have played at least one match for KTK and is listed alphabetically by their first name.

== Key ==
General

- Mat – Number of matches played

Batting

- Inn – Number of innings batted
- NO – Number of innings not out
- Runs – Runs scored in career
- HS – Highest score
- 50 – Half-centuries scored
- Avg – Runs scored per dismissal
- * – Batsman remained not out

Bowling

- Balls – Balls bowled in career
- Wkt – Wickets taken in career
- BBI – Best bowling in an innings
- Ave – Average runs per wicket

Fielding

- Ca – Catches taken
- St – Stumpings effected

== Players ==
Kochi Tuskers Kerala cricketers
General				Batting						Bowling				Fielding	
No.	Name	Nationality	Mat	Inn	NO	Runs	HS	50	Avg	Balls	Wkt	BBI	Ave	Ca	St
1	Balachandra Akhil	India	1	1	0	13	13	0	13.00	12	0	0/21	–	0	0
2	Brad Hodge	Australia	14	14	6	285	51	1	35.62	66	7	4/13	11.00	13	0
3	Brendon McCullum	New Zealand	13	13	0	357	81	1	27.46	0	–	–	–	2	0
4	Gnaneswara Rao	India	2	1	0	19	19	0	19.00	6	0	0/7	–	2	0
5	Kedar Jadhav	India	6	4	1	18	12	0	6.00	0	–	–	–	2	0
6	Mahela Jayawardene (C)	Sri Lanka	13	13	0	299	76	3	23.00	0	–	–	–	6	0
7	Michael Klinger	Australia	4	4	0	73	29	0	18.25	0	–	–	–	0	0
8	Muttiah Muralitharan	Sri Lanka	5	1	1	5	5*	0	–	114	2	1/18	–	1	0
9	Owais Shah	England	3	2	0	26	23	0	13.00	0	–	–	–	2	0
10	Padmanabhan Prasanth	India	1	0	0	–	–	0	–	6	0	0/18	–	0	0
11	Parthiv Patel	India	14	14	3	202	37*	0	20.20	0	–	–	–	8	1
12	Prasanth Parameswaran	India	5	1	1	1	1*	0	–	94	4	2/20	–	0	0
13	Raiphi Gomez	India	11	8	3	46	26*	0	9.20	90	5	2/14	24.80	1	0
14	Ramesh Powar	India	5	3	2	11	8*	0	11.00	72	2	1/20	56.00	0	0
15	Ravindra Jadeja	India	14	12	3	283	47	0	31.44	252	8	2/25	38.12	1	0
16	R. P. Singh	India	14	5	2	2	1*	0	0.66	300	13	4/25	26.53	6	0
17	Sreesanth	India	9	3	1	1	1	0	0.50	191	7	2/10	29.42	1	0
18	Thisara Perera	Sri Lanka	4	2	0	23	22	0	11.50	84	2	1/30	55.50	0	0
19	Vinay Kumar	India	13	7	1	50	18	0	8.33	268	4	3/25	27.91	4	0
20	VVS Laxman	India	3	3	0	44	36	0	14.66	0	–	–	–	0	0
