= 2011 Champions League Twenty20 =

International cricket tournament

- Administrators: BCCI; Cricket Australia; Cricket South Africa
- Cricket format: Twenty20
- Tournament format(s): Round-robin and knockout
- Host: India
- Champions: Mumbai Indians (1st title)
- Runners-up: Royal Challengers Bangalore
- Participants: 10
- Matches: 23
- Player of the series: Lasith Malinga
- Most runs: David Warner (358)
- Most wickets: Ravi Rampaul (12)
- Official website: www.clt20.com

The 2011 Champions League Twenty20 was the third edition of the Champions League Twenty20, an international Twenty20 cricket tournament. It was held in India from 19 September to 9 October 2011. The defending champions were the Chennai Super Kings. Mumbai Indians won the tournament, defeating Royal Challengers Bangalore in the final.

== Format ==
The tournament was the first edition to feature a qualifying stage, in which six teams competed for three places in the final stages. The final stages of the tournament had the same format as the previous season, with a group stage and a knockout stage.

During the group stage, teams were divided into two groups of five teams. The top two teams in each group qualified for the semi-finals.

== Teams ==
The following teams qualified for the final stages of the competition:

Cricket Board	Team	How qualified
Australia	New South Wales Blues	Runners-up, 2010–11 KFC Twenty20 Big Bash
Australia	Southern Redbacks	Winners, 2010–11 KFC Twenty20 Big Bash
England and Wales	Somerset	Qualifying stage
India	Chennai Super Kings	Winners, 2011 Indian Premier League
India	Kolkata Knight Riders	Qualifying stage
India	Mumbai Indians	Third ranked team, 2011 Indian Premier League
India	Royal Challengers Bangalore	Runners-up, 2011 Indian Premier League
South Africa	Warriors	Runners-up, 2010–11 Standard Bank Pro20
South Africa	Cape Cobras	Winners, 2010–11 Standard Bank Pro20
West Indies	Trinidad and Tobago	Qualifying stage

== Squads ==
Eight players were originally nominated for two squads and were allowed to decide which team they would play for, in each case choosing their Indian Premier League team. The tournament rules state each team may field only four overseas players, but an exception was made for Mumbai Indians who were allowed to field five as many of their Indian players were unable to play due to injury. Without this the team would have been unable to field a team.

== Venues ==

The tournament was hosted at three venues across India. The qualifying stage was held at Rajiv Gandhi International Cricket Stadium, with final stage matches held at M. A. Chidambaram Stadium in Chennai, M. Chinnaswamy Stadium in Bangalore and the Rajiv Gandhi Stadium in Hyderabad.

== Qualifying stage ==
The six-team qualifying stage was held between 19 and 21 September, with teams divided into two groups.

=== Pool A ===
Pos	Team	Pld	W	L	NR	Pts	NRR
1	Somerset	2	2	0	0	4	0.300
2	Kolkata Knight Riders	2	1	1	0	2	−0.225
3	Auckland Aces	2	0	2	0	0	−0.075

19 September	Kolkata Knight Riders; 121/6 (20 overs)	v	Auckland Aces; 119/6 (20 overs)	Kolkata Knight Riders won by 2 runs
20:00 (D/N); Scorecard	Kolkata Knight Riders; 121/6 (20 overs)	v	Auckland Aces; 119/6 (20 overs)	Rajiv Gandhi International Stadium, Hyderabad; Umpires: Billy Doctrove and Bruce Oxenford; Player of the match: Manvinder Bisla (Kolkata Knight Riders)
20:00 (D/N); Scorecard	Manvinder Bisla 45 (32); Kyle Mills 2/24 (4 overs)		Lou Vincent 40 (37); Yusuf Pathan 2/21 (4 overs)	Rajiv Gandhi International Stadium, Hyderabad; Umpires: Billy Doctrove and Bruce Oxenford; Player of the match: Manvinder Bisla (Kolkata Knight Riders)
Kolkata Knight Riders won the toss and chose to bat.				Rajiv Gandhi International Stadium, Hyderabad; Umpires: Billy Doctrove and Bruce Oxenford; Player of the match: Manvinder Bisla (Kolkata Knight Riders)

20 September	Auckland Aces; 125/7 (20 overs)	v	Somerset; 126/6 (20 overs)	Somerset won by 4 wickets
20:00 (D/N); Scorecard	Auckland Aces; 125/7 (20 overs)	v	Somerset; 126/6 (20 overs)	Rajiv Gandhi International Stadium, Hyderabad; Umpires: Sudhir Asnani and Billy Doctrove; Player of the match: Steve Snell (Somerset)
20:00 (D/N); Scorecard	Lou Vincent 47* (47); Alfonso Thomas 2/21 (4 overs)		Steve Snell 34* (24); Michael Bates 2/13 (4 overs)	Rajiv Gandhi International Stadium, Hyderabad; Umpires: Sudhir Asnani and Billy Doctrove; Player of the match: Steve Snell (Somerset)
Auckland won the toss and chose to bat.				Rajiv Gandhi International Stadium, Hyderabad; Umpires: Sudhir Asnani and Billy Doctrove; Player of the match: Steve Snell (Somerset)

21 September	Somerset; 166/6 (20 overs)	v	Kolkata Knight Riders; 155/8 (20 overs)	Somerset won by 11 runs
20:00 (D/N); Scorecard	Somerset; 166/6 (20 overs)	v	Kolkata Knight Riders; 155/8 (20 overs)	Rajiv Gandhi International Stadium, Hyderabad; Umpires: Billy Doctrove and Bruce Oxenford; Player of the match: Peter Trego (Somerset)
20:00 (D/N); Scorecard	Peter Trego 70 (61); Jaydev Unadkat 2/31 (4 overs)		Ryan ten Doeschate 46 (31); Roelof van der Merwe 2/23 (4 overs)	Rajiv Gandhi International Stadium, Hyderabad; Umpires: Billy Doctrove and Bruce Oxenford; Player of the match: Peter Trego (Somerset)
Somerset won the toss and chose to bat.				Rajiv Gandhi International Stadium, Hyderabad; Umpires: Billy Doctrove and Bruce Oxenford; Player of the match: Peter Trego (Somerset)

=== Pool B ===
Pos	Team	Pld	W	L	NR	Pts	NRR
1	Trinidad and Tobago	2	2	0	0	4	1.659
2	Ruhuna	2	1	1	0	2	−0.275
3	Leicestershire Foxes	2	0	2	0	0	−1.375

19 September	Ruhuna; 138 (18.5 overs)	v	Trinidad and Tobago; 144/5 (20 overs)	Trinidad and Tobago won by 5 wickets
16:00 (D/N); Scorecard	Ruhuna; 138 (18.5 overs)	v	Trinidad and Tobago; 144/5 (20 overs)	Rajiv Gandhi International Stadium, Hyderabad; Umpires: Sudhir Asnani and Bruce Oxenford; Player of the match: Sherwin Ganga (Trinidad and Tobago)
16:00 (D/N); Scorecard	Dinesh Chandimal 50 (48); Ravi Rampaul 2/17 (4 overs)		Darren Bravo 44* (49); Janaka Gunaratne 2/20 (4 overs)	Rajiv Gandhi International Stadium, Hyderabad; Umpires: Sudhir Asnani and Bruce Oxenford; Player of the match: Sherwin Ganga (Trinidad and Tobago)
Ruhuna won the toss and chose to bat.				Rajiv Gandhi International Stadium, Hyderabad; Umpires: Sudhir Asnani and Bruce Oxenford; Player of the match: Sherwin Ganga (Trinidad and Tobago)

20 September	Trinidad and Tobago; 168/2 (20 overs)	v	Leicestershire Foxes; 117/9 (20 overs)	Trinidad and Tobago won by 51 runs
16:00 (D/N); Scorecard	Trinidad and Tobago; 168/2 (20 overs)	v	Leicestershire Foxes; 117/9 (20 overs)	Rajiv Gandhi International Stadium, Hyderabad; Umpires: Sudhir Asnani and Bruce Oxenford; Player of the match: Adrian Barath (Trinidad and Tobago)
16:00 (D/N); Scorecard	Lendl Simmons 67 (58); Harry Gurney 2/33 (4 overs)		James Taylor 56* (47); Ravi Rampaul 4/14 (4 overs)	Rajiv Gandhi International Stadium, Hyderabad; Umpires: Sudhir Asnani and Bruce Oxenford; Player of the match: Adrian Barath (Trinidad and Tobago)
Trinidad and Tobago won the toss and chose to bat.; The Trinidad and Tobago opening partnership of 139 between Lendl Simmons and Adrian Barath is the 2nd highest in the history of Champions League Twenty20				Rajiv Gandhi International Stadium, Hyderabad; Umpires: Sudhir Asnani and Bruce Oxenford; Player of the match: Adrian Barath (Trinidad and Tobago)

21 September	Ruhuna; 160/6 (20 overs)	v	Leicestershire Foxes; 156/8 (20 overs)	Ruhuna won by 4 runs
16:00 (D/N); Scorecard	Ruhuna; 160/6 (20 overs)	v	Leicestershire Foxes; 156/8 (20 overs)	Rajiv Gandhi International Stadium, Hyderabad; Umpires: Sudhir Asnani and Billy Doctrove; Player of the match: Dinesh Chandimal (Ruhuna)
16:00 (D/N); Scorecard	Dinesh Chandimal 62 (51); Harry Gurney 3/33 (4 overs)		Abdul Razzaq 68 (46); Janaka Gunaratne 3/27 (4 overs)	Rajiv Gandhi International Stadium, Hyderabad; Umpires: Sudhir Asnani and Billy Doctrove; Player of the match: Dinesh Chandimal (Ruhuna)
Leicestershire won the toss and chose to field.				Rajiv Gandhi International Stadium, Hyderabad; Umpires: Sudhir Asnani and Billy Doctrove; Player of the match: Dinesh Chandimal (Ruhuna)

== Final stages fixtures ==
All match times in Indian Standard Time (UTC+5:30).

=== Group A ===
Pos	Team	Pld	W	L	NR	Pts	NRR
1	New South Wales Blues	4	3	1	0	6	0.627
2	Mumbai Indians	4	2	1	1	5	−0.280
3	Trinidad and Tobago	4	2	2	0	4	0.176
4	Cape Cobras	4	1	2	1	3	0.229
5	Chennai Super Kings	4	1	3	0	2	−0.712

24 September	New South Wales Blues; 135/8 (20 overs)	v	Cape Cobras; 136/3 (17.2 overs)	Cape Cobras won by 7 wickets
16:00 (D/N); Scorecard	New South Wales Blues; 135/8 (20 overs)	v	Cape Cobras; 136/3 (17.2 overs)	M. A. Chidambaram Stadium, Chennai; Umpires: Billy Bowden and Shavir Tarapore; Player of the match: Herschelle Gibbs (Cape Cobras)
16:00 (D/N); Scorecard	Shane Watson 34 (29); Vernon Philander 2/21 (4 overs)		Herschelle Gibbs 55 (47); Moises Henriques 1/20 (3.2 overs)	M. A. Chidambaram Stadium, Chennai; Umpires: Billy Bowden and Shavir Tarapore; Player of the match: Herschelle Gibbs (Cape Cobras)
New South Wales Blues won the toss and elected to bat.				M. A. Chidambaram Stadium, Chennai; Umpires: Billy Bowden and Shavir Tarapore; Player of the match: Herschelle Gibbs (Cape Cobras)

24 September	Chennai Super Kings; 158/4 (20 overs)	v	Mumbai Indians; 159/7 (19.5 overs)	Mumbai Indians won by 3 wickets
20:00 (D/N); Scorecard	Chennai Super Kings; 158/4 (20 overs)	v	Mumbai Indians; 159/7 (19.5 overs)	M. A. Chidambaram Stadium, Chennai; Umpires: Billy Bowden and Johanes Cloete; Player of the match: Lasith Malinga (Mumbai Indians)
20:00 (D/N); Scorecard	Michael Hussey 81 (57); Abu Nechim 2/35 (4 overs)		Lasith Malinga 37* (18); Suresh Raina 2/6 (2 overs)	M. A. Chidambaram Stadium, Chennai; Umpires: Billy Bowden and Johanes Cloete; Player of the match: Lasith Malinga (Mumbai Indians)
Chennai Super Kings won the toss and elected to bat.				M. A. Chidambaram Stadium, Chennai; Umpires: Billy Bowden and Johanes Cloete; Player of the match: Lasith Malinga (Mumbai Indians)

26 September	Trinidad and Tobago; 98 (16.2 overs)	v	Mumbai Indians; 99/9 (20 overs)	Mumbai Indians won by 1 wicket
20:00 (D/N); Scorecard	Trinidad and Tobago; 98 (16.2 overs)	v	Mumbai Indians; 99/9 (20 overs)	M. Chinnaswamy Stadium, Bengaluru; Umpires: Kumar Dharmasena and Marais Erasmus; Player of the match: Ravi Rampaul (Trinidad and Tobago)
20:00 (D/N); Scorecard	Jason Mohammed 23 (27); Harbhajan Singh 3/22 (4 overs)		Ambati Rayudu 36 (47); Ravi Rampaul 3/17 (4 overs)	M. Chinnaswamy Stadium, Bengaluru; Umpires: Kumar Dharmasena and Marais Erasmus; Player of the match: Ravi Rampaul (Trinidad and Tobago)
Trinidad and Tobago won the toss and elected to bat.				M. Chinnaswamy Stadium, Bengaluru; Umpires: Kumar Dharmasena and Marais Erasmus; Player of the match: Ravi Rampaul (Trinidad and Tobago)

28 September	Trinidad and Tobago; 139/6 (20 overs)	v	New South Wales Blues; 139/8 (20 overs)	Scores level; New South Wales Blues won the Super Over
16:00 (D/N); Scorecard	Trinidad and Tobago; 139/6 (20 overs)	v	New South Wales Blues; 139/8 (20 overs)	M. A. Chidambaram Stadium, Chennai; Umpires: Johanes Cloete and Shavir Tarapore; Player of the match: Moisés Henriques (New South Wales Blues)
16:00 (D/N); Scorecard	Lendl Simmons 41 (26); Moisés Henriques 2/27 (4 overs)		David Warner 38 (35); Sherwin Ganga 3/26 (4 overs)	M. A. Chidambaram Stadium, Chennai; Umpires: Johanes Cloete and Shavir Tarapore; Player of the match: Moisés Henriques (New South Wales Blues)
Trinidad and Tobago won the toss and elected to bat.				M. A. Chidambaram Stadium, Chennai; Umpires: Johanes Cloete and Shavir Tarapore; Player of the match: Moisés Henriques (New South Wales Blues)

28 September	Cape Cobras; 145/7 (20 overs)	v	Chennai Super Kings; 146/6 (19.4 overs)	Chennai Super Kings won by 4 wickets
20:00 (D/N); Scorecard	Cape Cobras; 145/7 (20 overs)	v	Chennai Super Kings; 146/6 (19.4 overs)	M. A. Chidambaram Stadium, Chennai; Umpires: Johanes Cloete and Billy Bowden; Player of the match: Dwayne Bravo (Chennai Super Kings)
20:00 (D/N); Scorecard	Owais Shah 45 (38); Dwayne Bravo 2/23 (4 overs)		Dwayne Bravo 46* (25); Jean-Paul Duminy 4/20 (4 overs)	M. A. Chidambaram Stadium, Chennai; Umpires: Johanes Cloete and Billy Bowden; Player of the match: Dwayne Bravo (Chennai Super Kings)
Cape Cobras won the toss and elected to bat.				M. A. Chidambaram Stadium, Chennai; Umpires: Johanes Cloete and Billy Bowden; Player of the match: Dwayne Bravo (Chennai Super Kings)

30 September	Mumbai Indians; 176/5 (20 overs)	v	Cape Cobras	No result
20:00 (D/N); Scorecard	Mumbai Indians; 176/5 (20 overs)	v	Cape Cobras	M. Chinnaswamy Stadium, Bengaluru; Umpires: Kumar Dharmasena and S Ravi
20:00 (D/N); Scorecard	Kieron Pollard 58 (37); Robin Peterson 2/29 (4 overs)			M. Chinnaswamy Stadium, Bengaluru; Umpires: Kumar Dharmasena and S Ravi
Cape Cobras won the toss and elected to field.; Match abandoned due to rain				M. Chinnaswamy Stadium, Bengaluru; Umpires: Kumar Dharmasena and S Ravi

2 October	Mumbai Indians; 100/7 (20 overs)	v	New South Wales Blues; 101/5 (17 overs)	New South Wales Blues won by 5 wickets
16:00 (D/N); Scorecard	Mumbai Indians; 100/7 (20 overs)	v	New South Wales Blues; 101/5 (17 overs)	M. A. Chidambaram Stadium, Chennai; Umpires: Johanes Cloete and Shavir Tarapore; Player of the match: Steve Smith (New South Wales Blues)
16:00 (D/N); Scorecard	James Franklin 42* (51); Stuart Clark 2/15 (4 overs)		Steve Smith 45* (47); Abu Nechim 3/23 (4 overs)	M. A. Chidambaram Stadium, Chennai; Umpires: Johanes Cloete and Shavir Tarapore; Player of the match: Steve Smith (New South Wales Blues)
Mumbai Indians won the toss and elected to bat.				M. A. Chidambaram Stadium, Chennai; Umpires: Johanes Cloete and Shavir Tarapore; Player of the match: Steve Smith (New South Wales Blues)

2 October	Trinidad and Tobago; 123/8 (20 overs)	v	Chennai Super Kings; 111/6 (20 overs)	Trinidad and Tobago won by 12 runs
20:00 (D/N); Scorecard	Trinidad and Tobago; 123/8 (20 overs)	v	Chennai Super Kings; 111/6 (20 overs)	M. A. Chidambaram Stadium, Chennai; Umpires: Billy Bowden and Shavir Tarapore; Player of the match: Sunil Narine (Trinidad and Tobago)
20:00 (D/N); Scorecard	William Perkins 34 (28); Doug Bollinger 3/30 (4 overs)		Dwayne Bravo 32* (22); Sunil Narine 3/8 (4 overs)	M. A. Chidambaram Stadium, Chennai; Umpires: Billy Bowden and Shavir Tarapore; Player of the match: Sunil Narine (Trinidad and Tobago)
Trinidad and Tobago won the toss and elected to bat.				M. A. Chidambaram Stadium, Chennai; Umpires: Billy Bowden and Shavir Tarapore; Player of the match: Sunil Narine (Trinidad and Tobago)

4 October	Cape Cobras; 137/4 (20 overs)	v	Trinidad and Tobago; 138/8 (19.4 overs)	Trinidad and Tobago won by 2 wickets
16:00 (D/N); Scorecard	Cape Cobras; 137/4 (20 overs)	v	Trinidad and Tobago; 138/8 (19.4 overs)	M. A. Chidambaram Stadium, Chennai; Umpires: Billy Bowden and Shavir Tarapore; Player of the match: Kevon Cooper (Trinidad and Tobago)
16:00 (D/N); Scorecard	Owais Shah 63* (50); Narine, Badree 1/19 (4 overs)		Darren Bravo 29 (36); Justin Kemp 3/22 (4 overs)	M. A. Chidambaram Stadium, Chennai; Umpires: Billy Bowden and Shavir Tarapore; Player of the match: Kevon Cooper (Trinidad and Tobago)
Cape Cobras won the toss and elected to bat.				M. A. Chidambaram Stadium, Chennai; Umpires: Billy Bowden and Shavir Tarapore; Player of the match: Kevon Cooper (Trinidad and Tobago)

4 October	New South Wales Blues; 201/2 (20 overs)	v	Chennai Super Kings; 155 (18.5 overs)	New South Wales Blues won by 46 runs
20:00 (D/N); Scorecard	New South Wales Blues; 201/2 (20 overs)	v	Chennai Super Kings; 155 (18.5 overs)	M. A. Chidambaram Stadium, Chennai; Umpires: Billy Bowden and Johanes Cloete; Player of the match: David Warner (New South Wales Blues)
20:00 (D/N); Scorecard	David Warner 135* (69); Nuwan Kulasekara 1/23 (4 overs)		Michael Hussey 37 (27); Stephen O'Keefe 3/28 (4 overs)	M. A. Chidambaram Stadium, Chennai; Umpires: Billy Bowden and Johanes Cloete; Player of the match: David Warner (New South Wales Blues)
New South Wales Blues won the toss and elected to bat.; David Warner became the second man and the first Australian to score a century in a Champions League Twenty20				M. A. Chidambaram Stadium, Chennai; Umpires: Billy Bowden and Johanes Cloete; Player of the match: David Warner (New South Wales Blues)

=== Group B ===
Pos	Team	Pld	W	L	NR	Pts	NRR
1	Somerset	4	2	1	1	5	−0.557
2	Royal Challengers Bangalore	4	2	2	0	4	0.325
3	Kolkata Knight Riders	4	2	2	0	4	0.306
4	Warriors	4	2	2	0	4	0.246
5	Southern Redbacks	4	1	2	1	3	−0.533

23 September	Royal Challengers Bangalore; 172/8 (20 overs)	v	Warriors; 173/7 (20 overs)	Warriors won by 3 wickets
20:00; Scorecard	Royal Challengers Bangalore; 172/8 (20 overs)	v	Warriors; 173/7 (20 overs)	M. Chinnaswamy Stadium, Bengaluru; Umpires: Kumar Dharmasena and Marais Erasmus; Player of the match: Ashwell Prince (Warriors)
20:00; Scorecard	Virat Kohli 34 (29); Rusty Theron 4/29 (3 overs)		Ashwell Prince 74 (55); Abhimanyu Mithun 2/25 (2 overs)	M. Chinnaswamy Stadium, Bengaluru; Umpires: Kumar Dharmasena and Marais Erasmus; Player of the match: Ashwell Prince (Warriors)
Warriors won the toss and chose to field.				M. Chinnaswamy Stadium, Bengaluru; Umpires: Kumar Dharmasena and Marais Erasmus; Player of the match: Ashwell Prince (Warriors)

25 September	Warriors; 171/5 (20 overs)	v	Southern Redbacks; 121/6 (20 overs)	Warriors won by 50 runs
16:00; Scorecard	Warriors; 171/5 (20 overs)	v	Southern Redbacks; 121/6 (20 overs)	Rajiv Gandhi International Stadium, Hyderabad; Umpires: Sudhir Asnani and Billy Doctrove; Player of the match: Jon-Jon Smuts (Warriors)
16:00; Scorecard	Jon-Jon Smuts 88 (65); Daniel Harris 2/23 (4 overs)		Michael Klinger 34 (29); Lonwabo Tsotsobe 2/30 (4 overs)	Rajiv Gandhi International Stadium, Hyderabad; Umpires: Sudhir Asnani and Billy Doctrove; Player of the match: Jon-Jon Smuts (Warriors)
Warriors won the toss and elected to bat.				Rajiv Gandhi International Stadium, Hyderabad; Umpires: Sudhir Asnani and Billy Doctrove; Player of the match: Jon-Jon Smuts (Warriors)

25 September	Kolkata Knight Riders; 161/3 (20 overs)	v	Somerset; 164/5 (19.4 overs)	Somerset won by 5 wickets
20:00 (D/N); Scorecard	Kolkata Knight Riders; 161/3 (20 overs)	v	Somerset; 164/5 (19.4 overs)	Rajiv Gandhi International Stadium, Hyderabad; Umpires: Billy Doctrove and Bruce Oxenford; Player of the match: Roelof van der Merwe (Somerset)
20:00 (D/N); Scorecard	Jacques Kallis 74* (61); Lewis Gregory 2/9 (2 overs)		Roelof van der Merwe 73 (40); Rajat Bhatia 2/37 (3.4 overs)	Rajiv Gandhi International Stadium, Hyderabad; Umpires: Billy Doctrove and Bruce Oxenford; Player of the match: Roelof van der Merwe (Somerset)
Kolkata Knight Riders won the toss and elected to bat.				Rajiv Gandhi International Stadium, Hyderabad; Umpires: Billy Doctrove and Bruce Oxenford; Player of the match: Roelof van der Merwe (Somerset)

27 September	Southern Redbacks; 188/5 (20 overs)	v	Kolkata Knight Riders; 169/9 (20 overs)	Southern Redbacks won by 19 runs
20:00 (D/N); Scorecard	Southern Redbacks; 188/5 (20 overs)	v	Kolkata Knight Riders; 169/9 (20 overs)	Rajiv Gandhi International Stadium, Hyderabad; Umpires: Sudhir Asnani and Bruce Oxenford; Player of the match: Callum Ferguson (Southern Redbacks)
20:00 (D/N); Scorecard	Callum Ferguson 70* (40); Lakshmipathy Balaji 2/27 (3 overs)		Manoj Tiwary 40 (31); Gary Putland 3/31 (4 overs)	Rajiv Gandhi International Stadium, Hyderabad; Umpires: Sudhir Asnani and Bruce Oxenford; Player of the match: Callum Ferguson (Southern Redbacks)
Southern Redbacks won the toss and elected to bat.				Rajiv Gandhi International Stadium, Hyderabad; Umpires: Sudhir Asnani and Bruce Oxenford; Player of the match: Callum Ferguson (Southern Redbacks)

29 September	Royal Challengers Bangalore; 169/9 (20 overs)	v	Kolkata Knight Riders; 171/1 (17.3 overs)	Kolkata Knight Riders won by 9 wickets
20:00 (D/N); Scorecard	Royal Challengers Bangalore; 169/9 (20 overs)	v	Kolkata Knight Riders; 171/1 (17.3 overs)	M. Chinnaswamy Stadium, Bengaluru; Umpires: Billy Doctrove and Bruce Oxenford; Player of the match: Jacques Kallis (Kolkata Knight Riders)
20:00 (D/N); Scorecard	Daniel Vettori 44 (23); Iqbal Abdulla 2/20 (3 overs)		Jacques Kallis 64* (47); Daniel Vettori 1/27 (4 overs)	M. Chinnaswamy Stadium, Bengaluru; Umpires: Billy Doctrove and Bruce Oxenford; Player of the match: Jacques Kallis (Kolkata Knight Riders)
Kolkata Knight Riders won the toss and chose to field.				M. Chinnaswamy Stadium, Bengaluru; Umpires: Billy Doctrove and Bruce Oxenford; Player of the match: Jacques Kallis (Kolkata Knight Riders)

1 October	Somerset	v	Southern Redbacks	Match abandoned
16:00 (D/N); Scorecard	Somerset	v	Southern Redbacks	M. Chinnaswamy Stadium, Bengaluru; Umpires: Marais Erasmus and S Ravi
Southern Redbacks won the toss and chose to field.; Match abandoned without a ball being bowled due to rain				M. Chinnaswamy Stadium, Bengaluru; Umpires: Marais Erasmus and S Ravi

1 October	Warriors; 155/4 (20 overs)	v	Kolkata Knight Riders; 83/1 (9 overs)	Kolkata Knight Riders won by 22 runs (D/L)
20:00 (D/N); Scorecard	Warriors; 155/4 (20 overs)	v	Kolkata Knight Riders; 83/1 (9 overs)	M. Chinnaswamy Stadium, Bengaluru; Umpires: Marais Erasmus and S Ravi; Player of the match: Colin Ingram (Warriors)
20:00 (D/N); Scorecard	Colin Ingram 61 (47); Lakshmipathy Balaji 2/35 (4 overs)		Gautam Gambhir 33* (23); Wayne Parnell 1/24 (2 overs)	M. Chinnaswamy Stadium, Bengaluru; Umpires: Marais Erasmus and S Ravi; Player of the match: Colin Ingram (Warriors)
Kolkata Knight Riders won the toss and chose to field.; Rain ended the match after 9 overs in the Kolkata Knight Riders' innings. Their target was 62 runs from 9 overs according to the Duckworth–Lewis method.				M. Chinnaswamy Stadium, Bengaluru; Umpires: Marais Erasmus and S Ravi; Player of the match: Colin Ingram (Warriors)

3 October	Royal Challengers Bangalore; 206/6 (20 overs)	v	Somerset; 155/6 (20 overs)	Royal Challengers Bangalore won by 51 runs
20:00 (D/N); Scorecard	Royal Challengers Bangalore; 206/6 (20 overs)	v	Somerset; 155/6 (20 overs)	M. Chinnaswamy Stadium, Bengaluru; Umpires: Kumar Dharmasena and Marais Erasmus; Player of the match: Chris Gayle (Royal Challengers Bangalore)
20:00 (D/N); Scorecard	Chris Gayle 86 (46); Steve Kirby 2/23 (4 overs)		Peter Trego 58 (38); Sreenath Aravind 2/23 (4 overs)	M. Chinnaswamy Stadium, Bengaluru; Umpires: Kumar Dharmasena and Marais Erasmus; Player of the match: Chris Gayle (Royal Challengers Bangalore)
Somerset won the toss and elected to field.				M. Chinnaswamy Stadium, Bengaluru; Umpires: Kumar Dharmasena and Marais Erasmus; Player of the match: Chris Gayle (Royal Challengers Bangalore)

5 October	Somerset; 146/4 (20 overs)	v	Warriors; 134/8 (20 overs)	Somerset won by 12 runs
16:00 (D/N); Scorecard	Somerset; 146/4 (20 overs)	v	Warriors; 134/8 (20 overs)	M. Chinnaswamy Stadium, Bengaluru; Umpires: Kumar Dharmasena and S Ravi; Player of the match: Alfonso Thomas (Somerset)
16:00 (D/N); Scorecard	Craig Kieswetter 56* (52); Johan Botha 1/20 (4 overs)		Jon-Jon Smuts 38 (39); Alfonso Thomas 2/16 (4 overs)	M. Chinnaswamy Stadium, Bengaluru; Umpires: Kumar Dharmasena and S Ravi; Player of the match: Alfonso Thomas (Somerset)
Somerset won the toss and elected to bat.				M. Chinnaswamy Stadium, Bengaluru; Umpires: Kumar Dharmasena and S Ravi; Player of the match: Alfonso Thomas (Somerset)

5 October	Southern Redbacks; 214/2 (20 overs)	v	Royal Challengers Bangalore; 215/8 (20 overs)	Royal Challengers Bangalore won by 2 wickets
20:00 (D/N); Scorecard	Southern Redbacks; 214/2 (20 overs)	v	Royal Challengers Bangalore; 215/8 (20 overs)	M. Chinnaswamy Stadium, Bengaluru; Umpires: Kumar Dharmasena and S Ravi; Player of the match: Virat Kohli (Royal Challengers Bangalore)
20:00 (D/N); Scorecard	Daniel Harris 108* (61); Syed Mohammad 1/29 (4 overs)		Tillakaratne Dilshan 74 (47); Shaun Tait 5/32 (4 overs)	M. Chinnaswamy Stadium, Bengaluru; Umpires: Kumar Dharmasena and S Ravi; Player of the match: Virat Kohli (Royal Challengers Bangalore)
Southern Redbacks won the toss and elected to bat.				M. Chinnaswamy Stadium, Bengaluru; Umpires: Kumar Dharmasena and S Ravi; Player of the match: Virat Kohli (Royal Challengers Bangalore)

=== Knockout stage ===
The top two teams from each group qualify for the semi-finals.

Semifinals
A1	New South Wales Blues	203/2 (20 ov)
B2	Royal Challengers Bangalore	204/4 (18.3 ov)
A2	Mumbai Indians	160/5 (20 ov)
B1	Somerset	150/7 (20 ov)

Final
B2	Royal Challengers Bangalore	108 (19.2 ov)
A2	Mumbai Indians	139 (20 ov)

==== Semi-finals ====
7 October	New South Wales Blues; 203/2 (20 overs)	v	Royal Challengers Bangalore; 204/4 (18.3 overs)	Royal Challengers Bangalore won by 6 wickets
20:00 (D/N); Scorecard	New South Wales Blues; 203/2 (20 overs)	v	Royal Challengers Bangalore; 204/4 (18.3 overs)	M. Chinnaswamy Stadium, Bengaluru; Attendance: 32,543; Umpires: Kumar Dharmasena and Marais Erasmus; Player of the match: Virat Kohli (Royal Challengers Bangalore)
20:00 (D/N); Scorecard	David Warner 123* (68); Tillakaratne Dilshan 1/10 (4 overs)		Chris Gayle 92 (41); Patrick Cummins 4/45 (4 overs)	M. Chinnaswamy Stadium, Bengaluru; Attendance: 32,543; Umpires: Kumar Dharmasena and Marais Erasmus; Player of the match: Virat Kohli (Royal Challengers Bangalore)
Royal Challengers Bangalore won the toss and elected to field.; David Warner became the fourth man and second century in Champions League Twenty20 and also became the first man to score back to back centuries in Champions League Twenty20; Royal Challengers Bangalore became the first team to successfully chase scores above 200 consecutively in Champions League Twenty20.				M. Chinnaswamy Stadium, Bengaluru; Attendance: 32,543; Umpires: Kumar Dharmasena and Marais Erasmus; Player of the match: Virat Kohli (Royal Challengers Bangalore)

8 October	Mumbai Indians; 160/5 (20 overs)	v	Somerset; 150/7 (20 overs)	Mumbai Indians won by 10 runs
20:00 (D/N); Scorecard	Mumbai Indians; 160/5 (20 overs)	v	Somerset; 150/7 (20 overs)	M. A. Chidambaram Stadium, Chennai; Attendance: 30,237; Umpires: Billy Bowden and Billy Doctrove; Player of the match: Lasith Malinga (Mumbai Indians)
20:00 (D/N); Scorecard	Aiden Blizzard 54 (39); Adam Dibble 1/20 (4 overs)		Craig Kieswetter 62 (46); Lasith Malinga 4/20 (4 overs)	M. A. Chidambaram Stadium, Chennai; Attendance: 30,237; Umpires: Billy Bowden and Billy Doctrove; Player of the match: Lasith Malinga (Mumbai Indians)
Mumbai Indians won the toss and elected to bat.				M. A. Chidambaram Stadium, Chennai; Attendance: 30,237; Umpires: Billy Bowden and Billy Doctrove; Player of the match: Lasith Malinga (Mumbai Indians)

==== Final ====
9 October	Mumbai Indians; 139 (20 overs)	v	Royal Challengers Bangalore; 108 (19.2 overs)	Mumbai Indians won by 31 runs
20:00 (D/N); Scorecard	Mumbai Indians; 139 (20 overs)	v	Royal Challengers Bangalore; 108 (19.2 overs)	M. A. Chidambaram Stadium, Chennai; Attendance: 36,201; Umpires: Kumar Dharmasena and Marais Erasmus; Player of the match: Harbhajan Singh (Mumbai Indians)
20:00 (D/N); Scorecard	James Franklin 41 (29); Rajoo Bhatkal 3/21 (3 overs)		Tillakaratne Dilshan 27 (20); Harbhajan Singh 3/20 (4 overs)	M. A. Chidambaram Stadium, Chennai; Attendance: 36,201; Umpires: Kumar Dharmasena and Marais Erasmus; Player of the match: Harbhajan Singh (Mumbai Indians)
Mumbai Indians won the toss and elected to bat.				M. A. Chidambaram Stadium, Chennai; Attendance: 36,201; Umpires: Kumar Dharmasena and Marais Erasmus; Player of the match: Harbhajan Singh (Mumbai Indians)

== Statistics ==
=== Most runs ===
Player	Team	Runs	High score
David Warner	New South Wales Blues	328	135*
Chris Gayle	Royal Challengers Bangalore	257	92
Virat Kohli	Royal Challengers Bangalore	232	84*
Jacques Kallis	Kolkata Knight Riders	223	74*
Jon-Jon Smuts	Warriors	184	88

=== Most wickets ===
Player	Team	Wickets	Best bowling
Ravi Rampaul	Trinidad and Tobago	12	4/14
Sunil Narine	Trinidad and Tobago	10	3/8
Lasith Malinga	Mumbai Indians	10	4/20
Abu Nechim	Mumbai Indians	8	3/23
Alfonso Thomas	Somerset	8	2/16
