= 2011 Indian Premier League =

Cricket tournament

- Dates: 8 April 2011 – 28 May 2011
- Administrator: Board of Control for Cricket in India
- Cricket format: Twenty20
- Tournament format(s): Group stage and playoffs
- Champions: Chennai Super Kings (2nd title)
- Runners-up: Royal Challengers Bangalore
- Participants: 10
- Matches: 74
- Player of the series: Chris Gayle (RCB)
- Most runs: Chris Gayle (RCB) (608)
- Most wickets: Lasith Malinga (MI) (28)
- Official website: www.iplt20.com

The 2011 Indian Premier League season, abbreviated as IPL 4 or the IPL 2011, was the fourth season of the Indian Premier League, the top Twenty20 cricket league in India. The tournament was hosted in India and the opening and closing ceremonies were held in M. A. Chidambaram Stadium, Chennai, the home venue of the reigning champions Chennai Super Kings. The season ran from 8 April to 28 May 2011. This season the number of teams in the league went from eight to ten with the additions of the Pune Warriors India and the Kochi Tuskers Kerala.

The tournament was won by the Chennai Super Kings for the second successive season defeating Royal Challengers Bangalore by 58 runs in the final in Chennai, with the winning team's Murali Vijay being named Man of the Match. With this win CSK became the first, and till 2014 the only team to have won the IPL on more than one occasion. They also became the first team to win consecutive IPL seasons, a distinction they held until the Mumbai Indians achieved the same feat across the 2019 and 2020 seasons. Despite Bangalore failing to win the title, one of the team's players, Chris Gayle was named as the tournament's best player. He scored 608 runs in twelve innings – the most in the tournament – as well as picking up eight wickets, having joined the team after the start of the season due to an injury to another overseas player, Dirk Nannes. Mumbai Indians' Lasith Malinga set a new record for most wickets taken within an Indian Premier League season, claiming 28 wickets during the campaign, but Mumbai had to settle for third place in the tournament, having lost to Bangalore in the second qualifier. Chennai, Bangalore and Mumbai represented India in the Champions League 2011 tournament in September. The Fair Play Award was again won by the Chennai Super Kings for topping the fair-play table, making that their second consecutive fair-play award (and third overall in four seasons thus far).

== Format ==
With the introduction of 2 new teams, a new ten-team format was created. This new format consisted of 74 matches and was introduced as retaining the previous format would result in 94 matches, significantly greater than the 60 matches from the previous season, where teams compete in a double round-robin tournament. The knockout stage was changed to a playoff format. If a match ends in a tie, a Super Over will be played to determine the winner.

The ten teams are divided into two groups of five. In the group stage, each team plays 14 games: facing the other four teams in their group two times each (one home and one away game), four teams in the other group once, and the remaining team two times. A random draw was used to determine the groups and who plays whom across the groups once and twice.

Each team plays the team in the same row and the same column twice, and all others once. For instance, Deccan Chargers will play Chennai Super Kings and the other Group A teams twice but the other teams from Group B (Kolkata Knight Riders, Kochi Tuskers Kerala, Royal Challengers Bangalore and Rajasthan Royals) only once. Similarly Kochi Tuskers Kerala will play Delhi Daredevils and the other Group B teams twice but all other teams from Group A only once.

Group A	Group B
Deccan Chargers	Chennai Super Kings
Delhi Daredevils	Kochi Tuskers Kerala
Kings XI Punjab	Kolkata Knight Riders
Mumbai Indians	Rajasthan Royals
Pune Warriors India	Royal Challengers Bangalore

A team winning a match would be awarded 2 points. The losing team would not receive any points. In case of a draw or no result, both teams would be awarded 1 point.

For the first time, replacing the traditional semi-finals and final format, a four-game playoff stage following the Page playoff system was to be held after the group stage. Four games were to be played in the playoffs:

- Qualifier 1: between the teams ranked first and second in the group stage.
- Eliminator: between the teams ranked third and fourth in the group stage.
- Qualifier 2: between the loser of the Qualifier 1 and winner of the Eliminator.
- Final: between the winners of the Qualifiers 1 and 2.

The top three teams from the tournament would qualify for the 2011 Champions League Twenty20 while the fourth team would enter the qualifying stage of the tournament. Due to the playoff format, the qualifying teams would be the top two teams of the group stage and the winner of the Eliminator in the playoff stage.

== Venues ==
Chennai	Mumbai	Kochi	Kolkata
Chennai Super Kings	Mumbai Indians	Kochi Tuskers Kerala	Kolkata Knight Riders
M. A. Chidambaram Stadium	Wankhede Stadium	Jawaharlal Nehru Stadium	Eden Gardens
Capacity: 50,000	Capacity: 33,000	Capacity: 60,000	Capacity: 90,000
Mohali	2011 Indian Premier League is located in India		Bangalore
Kings XI Punjab	2011 Indian Premier League is located in India		Royal Challengers Bangalore
PCA Stadium	2011 Indian Premier League is located in India		M. Chinnaswamy Stadium
Capacity: 30,000	2011 Indian Premier League is located in India		Capacity: 45,000
Hyderabad	2011 Indian Premier League is located in India		Delhi
Deccan Chargers	2011 Indian Premier League is located in India		Delhi Daredevils
Rajiv Gandhi International Cricket Stadium	2011 Indian Premier League is located in India		Feroz Shah Kotla
Capacity: 55,000	2011 Indian Premier League is located in India		Capacity: 48,000
Indore	Jaipur	Navi Mumbai	Dharamsala
Kochi Tuskers Kerala	Rajasthan Royals	Pune Warriors India	Kings XI Punjab
Holkar Cricket Stadium	Sawai Mansingh Stadium	DY Patil Stadium	HPCA Stadium
Capacity: 30,000	Capacity: 30,000	Capacity: 55,000	Capacity: 23,000

== Squads ==
Each team could have a squad of at most 30 players with a maximum of US$9 million to spend on purchasing players. . Choosing to retain players would subject to a reduction in their salary cap, reducing the amount they may spend on other players. All other players were added to the auction held on 8 and 9 January 2011.

The catchment areas of the eight existing teams were changed to account for the two new teams. Catchment areas are nominated areas to help each team select their local players. Each team must select four players from their area.

A total of 12 players have been retained by all the franchises while the remaining go to the auction list. The retained players – who must have been part of the franchise's registered squads for the 2010 season – were valued at $1.8 million for the first player, $1.3 million for the second, $900,000 for the third and $500,000 for the fourth. Mumbai Indians and Chennai Super Kings retained the maximum of four players while the Kings XI Punjab, Deccan Chargers and Kolkata Knight Riders released all their players. The RCB franchise owners only retained one player (Virat Kohli), but let go of a few key players – Rahul Dravid, Dale Steyn, Jacques Kallis. These players emerged very consistent subsequently in the years 2012 and 2013.

== Teams and standings ==
=== Points table ===
Pos	Grp	Team	Pld	W	L	NR	Pts	NRR
1	B	Royal Challengers Bangalore (R)	14	9	4	1	19	0.326
2	B	Chennai Super Kings (C)	14	9	5	0	18	0.443
3	A	Mumbai Indians (3)	14	9	5	0	18	0.040
4	B	Kolkata Knight Riders (4)	14	8	6	0	16	0.433
5	A	Kings XI Punjab	14	7	7	0	14	−0.051
6	B	Rajasthan Royals	14	6	7	1	13	−0.691
7	A	Deccan Chargers	14	6	8	0	12	0.222
8	B	Kochi Tuskers Kerala	14	6	8	0	12	−0.214
9	A	Pune Warriors India	14	4	9	1	9	−0.134
10	A	Delhi Daredevils	14	4	9	1	9	−0.448

Source: ESPNcricinfo

Note: Top four teams qualified for the playoffs.
The top three teams also qualified for the Champions League Twenty20 while the fourth team played in the qualifying stage.

("C" refers to the "Champions" of the Tournament. 'R'(2nd Position), '3' and '4' are the positions of the respective teams in the tournament.)

Pune and Kochi are new to the league. The auction for these teams was held at Chennai on 22 March 2010. These two bids, worth a total of Rs 3,235 crore, were more than the Rs 2,853 crore collectively paid for the eight franchises in the first auction, on 24 January 2008.

The Rajasthan Royals, and the Kings XI Punjab were temporarily ejected from the league due to issues with their unreported ownership changes. The teams were reinstated with involvement from the High Court. Their owners were broken into several legal entities when the BCCI required the incorporation of the companies. Kochi was also at risk of ejection for the same reasons before BCCI cleared their new ownership pattern for the tournament.

== Results ==
=== Group stage ===
Visitor team →	CSK	DC	DD	KXIP	KTK	KKR	MI	PWI	RR	RCB
Home team ↓	CSK	DC	DD	KXIP	KTK	KKR	MI	PWI	RR	RCB
Chennai Super Kings		Chennai; 19 runs	Chennai; 18 runs		Chennai; 11 runs	Chennai; 2 runs		Chennai; 25 runs	Chennai; 8 wickets	Chennai; 21 runs
Deccan Chargers			Delhi; 4 wickets	Punjab; 8 wickets		Kolkata; 20 runs	Mumbai; 37 runs	Pune; 6 wickets	Rajasthan; 8 wickets	Deccan; 33 runs
Delhi Daredevils		Deccan; 16 runs		Delhi; 29 runs	Kochi; 7 wickets	Kolkata; 17 runs	Mumbai; 8 wickets	Match abandoned		Bengaluru; 3 wickets
Kings XI Punjab	Punjab; 6 wickets	Deccan; 82 runs	Punjab; 29 runs				Punjab; 76 runs	Pune; 5 wickets	Punjab; 48 runs	Punjab; 111 runs
Kochi Tuskers Kerala	Kochi; 7 wickets (D/L)	Deccan; 55 runs	Delhi; 38 runs	Punjab; 6 wickets		Kochi; 17 runs			Kochi; 8 wickets	Bengaluru; 6 wickets
Kolkata Knight Riders	Kolkata; 10 runs (D/L)	Kolkata; 9 runs		Kolkata; 8 wickets	Kochi; 6 runs		Mumbai; 5 wickets		Kolkata; 8 wickets	Bengaluru; 9 wickets
Mumbai Indians	Mumbai; 8 runs	Deccan; 10 runs	Mumbai; 32 runs	Mumbai; 23 runs	Kochi; 8 wickets			Mumbai; 7 wickets	Rajasthan; 10 wickets	
Pune Warriors India	Chennai; 8 wickets	Deccan; 6 wickets	Delhi; 3 wickets	Pune; 7 wickets	Pune; 4 wickets	Kolkata; 7 wickets	Mumbai; 21 runs			
Rajasthan Royals	Chennai; 63 runs		Rajasthan; 6 wickets		Rajasthan; 8 wickets	Kolkata; 9 wickets	Rajasthan; 7 wickets	Rajasthan; 6 wickets		Bengaluru; 9 wickets
Royal Challengers Bengaluru	Bengaluru; 8 wickets			Bengaluru; 85 runs	Bengaluru; 9 wickets	Bengaluru; 4 wickets (D/L)	Mumbai; 9 wickets	Bengaluru; 26 runs	Match abandoned	

Home team won	Visitor team won

- Note: Results listed are according to the home (horizontal) and visitor (vertical) teams.
- Note: Click on a result to see a summary of the match.

Team	Group matches														Playoffs			
Team	1	2	3	4	5	6	7	8	9	10	11	12	13	14	Q1	E	Q2	F
Chennai Super Kings	2	2	4	4	4	6	8	10	12	12	14	16	18	18	W			W
Deccan Chargers	0	0	2	2	4	4	6	6	6	6	6	8	10	12				
Delhi Daredevils	0	0	2	2	4	4	4	6	6	8	8	8	8	9				
Kings XI Punjab	0	2	4	6	6	6	6	6	6	8	10	12	14	14				
Kochi Tuskers Kerala	0	0	2	4	6	6	6	6	8	10	10	10	12	12				
Kolkata Knight Riders	0	2	4	6	6	6	8	10	12	12	14	14	16	16		L		
Mumbai Indians	2	4	4	6	8	10	10	12	14	16	16	16	16	18		W	L	
Pune Warriors India	2	4	4	4	4	4	4	4	4	6	8	8	8	9				
Rajasthan Royals	2	4	4	4	5	5	7	9	11	11	11	11	11	13				
Royal Challengers Bengaluru	2	2	2	2	3	5	7	9	11	13	15	17	17	19	L		W	L

Win	Loss	No result

- Note: The total points at the end of each group match are listed.
- Note: Click on the points (group matches) or W/L (playoffs) to see the match summary.

== Fixtures ==
All match times in Indian Standard Time (UTC+5:30)

=== Matches ===
8 April (D/N)
Scorecard

(H) Chennai Super Kings; 153/4 (20 overs)	v	Kolkata Knight Riders; 151/7 (20 overs)

Chennai won by 2 runs
M. A. Chidambaram Stadium, Chennai (Group B)

9 April
Scorecard

(H) Deccan Chargers; 137/8 (20 overs)	v	Rajasthan Royals; 141/2 (18.5 overs)

Rajasthan won by 8 wickets
Rajiv Gandhi International Cricket Stadium, Hyderabad (Group A vs Group B)

9 April (D/N)
Scorecard

(H) Kochi Tuskers Kerala; 161/5 (20 overs)	v	Royal Challengers Bangalore; 162/4 (18.4 overs)

Bangalore won by 6 wickets
Jawaharlal Nehru Stadium, Kochi (Group B)

10 April
Scorecard

(H) Delhi Daredevils; 95 (17.4 overs)	v	Mumbai Indians; 99/2 (16.5 overs)

Mumbai won by 8 wickets
Feroz Shah Kotla, Delhi (Group A)

10 April (D/N)
Scorecard

Kings XI Punjab; 112/8 (20 overs)	v	Pune Warriors India (H); 113/3 (13.1 overs)

Pune won by 7 wickets
DY Patil Stadium, Navi Mumbai (Group A)

11 April (D/N)
Scorecard

(H) Kolkata Knight Riders; 163/4 (20 overs)	v	Deccan Chargers; 154/8 (20 overs)

Kolkata won by 9 runs
Eden Gardens, Kolkata (Group B vs Group A)

12 April
Scorecard

Delhi Daredevils; 151/6 (20 overs)	v	Rajasthan Royals (H); 152/4 (18.3 overs)

Rajasthan won by 6 wickets
Sawai Mansingh Stadium, Jaipur (Group A vs Group B)

12 April (D/N)
Scorecard

(H) Royal Challengers Bangalore; 140/4 (20 overs)	v	Mumbai Indians; 143/1 (18.3 overs)

Mumbai won by 9 wickets
M. Chinnaswamy Stadium, Bangalore (Group B vs Group A)

13 April
Scorecard

Chennai Super Kings; 188/4 (20 overs)	v	Kings XI Punjab (H); 193/4 (19.1 overs)

Punjab won by 6 wickets
Punjab Cricket Association Stadium, Mohali, Chandigarh (Group B vs Group A)

13 April (D/N)
Scorecard

Kochi Tuskers Kerala; 148/8 (20 overs)	v	Pune Warriors India (H); 151/6 (18.5 overs)

Pune won by 4 wickets
DY Patil Stadium, Navi Mumbai (Group B vs Group A)

14 April (D/N)
Scorecard

(H) Deccan Chargers; 175/5 (20 overs)	v	Royal Challengers Bangalore; 142/9 (20 overs)

Deccan won by 33 runs
Rajiv Gandhi International Cricket Stadium, Hyderabad (Group A vs Group B)

15 April
Scorecard

(H) Rajasthan Royals; 159/4 (20 overs)	v	Kolkata Knight Riders; 160/1 (18.3 overs)

Kolkata won by 9 wickets
Sawai Mansingh Stadium, Jaipur (Group B)

15 April (D/N)
Scorecard

(H) Mumbai Indians; 182/2 (20 overs)	v	Kochi Tuskers Kerala; 184/2 (19 overs)

Kochi won by 8 wickets
Wankhede Stadium, Mumbai (Group A vs Group B)

16 April
Scorecard

(H) Chennai Super Kings; 183/5 (20 overs)	v	Royal Challengers Bangalore; 162/7 (20 overs)

Chennai won by 21 runs
M. A. Chidambaram Stadium, Chennai (Group B)

16 April (D/N)
Scorecard

(H) Deccan Chargers; 165/8 (20 overs)	v	Kings XI Punjab; 166/2 (17.4 overs)

Punjab won by 8 wickets
Rajiv Gandhi International Cricket Stadium, Hyderabad (Group A)

17 April
Scorecard

(H) Pune Warriors India; 187/5 (20 overs)	v	Delhi Daredevils; 190/7 (19.2 overs)

Delhi won by 3 wickets
DY Patil Stadium, Navi Mumbai (Group A)

17 April (D/N)
Scorecard

Rajasthan Royals; 81 (15.2 overs)	v	Kolkata Knight Riders (H); 85/2 (13.5 overs)

Kolkata won by 8 wickets
Eden Gardens, Kolkata (Group B)

18 April (D/N)
Scorecard

Chennai Super Kings; 131/4 (17 overs)	v	Kochi Tuskers Kerala (H); 135/3 (15 overs)

Kochi won by 7 wickets (D/L)
Jawaharlal Nehru Stadium, Kochi (Group B)

19 April
Scorecard

Deccan Chargers; 168/4 (20 overs)	v	Delhi Daredevils (H); 152/7 (20 overs)

Deccan won by 16 runs
Feroz Shah Kotla, Delhi (Group A)

19 April (D/N)
Scorecard

(H) Royal Challengers Bangalore	v	Rajasthan Royals

No result
M. Chinnaswamy Stadium, Bangalore (Group B)

20 April
Scorecard

Pune Warriors India; 118 (17.2 overs)	v	Mumbai Indians (H); 124/3 (20 overs)

Mumbai won by 7 wickets
Wankhede Stadium, Mumbai (Group A)

20 April (D/N)
Scorecard

Kochi Tuskers Kerala; 132/7 (20 overs)	v	Kolkata Knight Riders (H); 126/9 (20 overs)

Kochi won by 6 runs
Eden Gardens, Kolkata (Group B)

21 April (D/N)
Scorecard

(H) Kings XI Punjab; 195/7 (20 overs)	v	Rajasthan Royals; 147/7 (20 overs)

Punjab won by 48 runs
Punjab Cricket Association Stadium, Mohali, Chandigarh (Group A vs Group B)

22 April
Scorecard

(H) Kolkata Knight Riders; 171/5 (20 overs)	v	Royal Challengers Bangalore; 175/1 (18.1 overs)

Bangalore won by 9 wickets
Eden Gardens, Kolkata (Group B)

22 April (D/N)
Scorecard

(H) Mumbai Indians; 164/4 (20 overs)	v	Chennai Super Kings; 156/9 (20 overs)

Mumbai won by 8 runs
Wankhede Stadium, Mumbai (Group A vs Group B)

23 April (D/N)
Scorecard

(H) Delhi Daredevils; 231/4 (20 overs)	v	Kings XI Punjab; 202/6 (20 overs)

Delhi won by 29 runs
Feroz Shah Kotla, Delhi (Group A)

24 April
Scorecard

Mumbai Indians; 172/4 (20 overs)	v	Deccan Chargers (H); 135/8 (20 overs)

Mumbai won by 37 runs
Rajiv Gandhi International Cricket Stadium, Hyderabad (Group A)

24 April (D/N)
Scorecard

Kochi Tuskers Kerala; 109 (20 overs)	v	Rajasthan Royals (H); 111/2 (14.1 overs)

Rajasthan won by 8 wickets
Sawai Mansingh Stadium, Jaipur (Group B)

25 April (D/N)
Scorecard

(H) Chennai Super Kings; 142/6 (20 overs)	v	Pune Warriors India; 117/9 (20 overs)

Chennai won by 25 runs
M. A. Chidambaram Stadium, Chennai (Group B vs Group A)

26 April (D/N)
Scorecard

(H) Delhi Daredevils; 160/6 (20 overs)	v	Royal Challengers Bangalore; 161/7 (19.3 overs)

Bangalore won by 3 wickets
Feroz Shah Kotla, Delhi (Group A vs Group B)

27 April
Scorecard

(H) Pune Warriors India; 141/6 (20 overs)	v	Chennai Super Kings; 145/2 (19.3 overs)

Chennai won by 8 wickets
DY Patil Stadium, Navi Mumbai (Group A vs Group B)

27 April (D/N)
Scorecard

Deccan Chargers; 129/6 (20 overs)	v	Kochi Tuskers Kerala (H); 74 (16.3 overs)

Deccan won by 55 runs
Jawaharlal Nehru Stadium, Kochi (Group A vs Group B)

28 April (D/N)
Scorecard

Kolkata Knight Riders; 148/7 (20 overs)	v	Delhi Daredevils (H); 131/9 (20 overs)

Kolkata won by 17 runs
Feroz Shah Kotla, Delhi (Group B vs Group A)

29 April
Scorecard

Mumbai Indians; 94/8 (20 overs)	v	Rajasthan Royals (H); 95/3 (18.1 overs)

Rajasthan won by 7 wickets
Sawai Mansingh Stadium, Jaipur (Group A vs Group B)

29 April (D/N)
Scorecard

(H) Royal Challengers Bangalore; 181/5 (20 overs)	v	Pune Warriors India; 155/5 (20 overs)

Bangalore won by 26 runs
M. Chinnaswamy Stadium, Bangalore (Group B vs Group A)

30 April
Scorecard

Delhi Daredevils; 157/7 (20 overs)	v	Kochi Tuskers Kerala (H); 119 (18.5 overs)

Delhi won by 38 runs
Jawaharlal Nehru Stadium, Kochi (Group A vs Group B)

30 April (D/N)
Scorecard

Kings XI Punjab; 119/6 (20 overs)	v	Kolkata Knight Riders (H); 120/2 (17.2 overs)

Kolkata won by 8 wickets
Eden Gardens, Kolkata (Group A vs Group B)

1 May
Scorecard

Pune Warriors India; 143/7 (20 overs)	v	Rajasthan Royals (H); 144/4 (19.3 overs)

Rajasthan won by 6 wickets
Sawai Mansingh Stadium, Jaipur (Group A vs Group B)

1 May (D/N)
Scorecard

(H) Chennai Super Kings; 165/5 (20 overs)	v	Deccan Chargers; 146/8 (20 overs)

Chennai won by 19 runs
M. A. Chidambaram Stadium, Chennai (Group A vs Group B)

2 May
Scorecard

(H) Mumbai Indians; 159/5 (20 overs)	v	Kings XI Punjab; 136/8 (20 overs)

Mumbai won by 23 runs
Wankhede Stadium, Mumbai (Group A)

2 May (D/N)
Scorecard

(H) Delhi Daredevils; 140/6 (20 overs)	v	Kochi Tuskers Kerala; 141/3 (15 overs)

Kochi won by 7 wickets
Feroz Shah Kotla, Delhi (Group A vs Group B)

3 May (D/N)
Scorecard

Kolkata Knight Riders; 169/4 (20 overs)	v	Deccan Chargers (H); 149/6 (20 overs)

Kolkata won by 20 runs
Rajiv Gandhi International Cricket Stadium, Hyderabad (Group B vs Group A)

4 May
Scorecard

Rajasthan Royals; 147/6 (20 overs)	v	Chennai Super Kings (H); 149/2 (18.4 overs)

Chennai won by 8 wickets
M. A. Chidambaram Stadium, Chennai (Group B)

4 May (D/N)
Scorecard

Mumbai Indians; 160/7 (20 overs)	v	Pune Warriors India (H); 139/7 (20 overs)

Mumbai won by 21 runs
DY Patil Stadium, Navi Mumbai (Group A)

5 May
Scorecard

(H) Kochi Tuskers Kerala; 156/5 (20 overs)	v	Kolkata Knight Riders; 139/7 (20 overs)

Kochi won by 17 runs
Jawaharlal Nehru Stadium, Kochi (Group B)

5 May (D/N)
Scorecard

(H) Deccan Chargers; 175/5 (20 overs)	v	Delhi Daredevils; 179/6 (19 overs)

Delhi won by 4 wickets
Rajiv Gandhi International Cricket Stadium, Hyderabad (Group A)

6 May (D/N)
Scorecard

(H) Royal Challengers Bangalore; 205/6 (20 overs)	v	Kings XI Punjab; 120/9 (20 overs)

Bangalore won by 85 runs
M. Chinnaswamy Stadium, Bangalore (Group B vs Group A)

7 May
Scorecard

Chennai Super Kings; 114/4 (20 overs)	v	Kolkata Knight Riders (H); 61/2 (10 overs)

Kolkata won by 10 runs (D/L)
Eden Gardens, Kolkata (Group B)

7 May (D/N)
Scorecard

(H) Mumbai Indians; 178/4 (20 overs)	v	Delhi Daredevils; 146 (19.5 overs)

Mumbai won by 32 runs
Wankhede Stadium, Mumbai (Group A)

8 May
Scorecard

Kochi Tuskers Kerala; 125/9 (20 overs)	v	Royal Challengers Bangalore (H); 128/1 (13.1 overs)

Bangalore won by 9 wickets
M. Chinnaswamy Stadium, Bangalore (Group B)

8 May (D/N)
Scorecard

(H) Kings XI Punjab; 119/8 (20 overs)	v	Pune Warriors India; 120/5 (17.1 overs)

Pune won by 5 wickets
Punjab Cricket Association Stadium, Mohali, Chandigarh (Group A)

9 May (D/N)
Scorecard

Chennai Super Kings; 196/3 (20 overs)	v	Rajasthan Royals (H); 133 (19.3 overs)

Chennai won by 63 runs
Sawai Mansingh Stadium, Jaipur (Group B)

10 May
Scorecard

(H) Deccan Chargers; 136/8 (20 overs)	v	Pune Warriors India; 137/4 (18.2 overs)

Pune won by 6 wickets
Rajiv Gandhi International Cricket Stadium, Hyderabad (Group A)

10 May (D/N)
Scorecard

(H) Kings XI Punjab; 163/8 (20 overs)	v	Mumbai Indians; 87 (12.5 overs)

Punjab won by 76 runs
Punjab Cricket Association Stadium, Mohali, Chandigarh (Group A)

11 May (D/N)
Scorecard

(H) Rajasthan Royals; 146/6 (20 overs)	v	Royal Challengers Bangalore; 151/1 (17 overs)

Bangalore won by 9 wickets
Sawai Mansingh Stadium, Jaipur (Group B)

12 May (D/N)
Scorecard

(H) Chennai Super Kings; 176/4 (20 overs)	v	Delhi Daredevils; 158/6 (20 overs)

Chennai won by 18 runs
M. A. Chidambaram Stadium, Chennai (Group B vs Group A)

13 May (D/N)
Scorecard

(H) Kochi Tuskers Kerala; 178/7 (20 overs)	v	Kings XI Punjab; 181/4 (18.5 overs)

Punjab won by 6 wickets
Holkar Cricket Stadium, Indore (Group B vs Group A)

14 May
Scorecard

Kolkata Knight Riders; 89/4 (13 overs)	v	Royal Challengers Bangalore (H); 105/6 (12.3 overs)

Bangalore won by 4 wickets (D/L)
M. Chinnaswamy Stadium, Bangalore (Group B)

14 May (D/N)
Scorecard

Deccan Chargers; 135/6 (20 overs)	v	Mumbai Indians (H); 125/8 (20 overs)

Deccan won by 10 runs
Wankhede Stadium, Mumbai (Group A)

15 May
Scorecard

(H) Kings XI Punjab; 170/6 (20 overs)	v	Delhi Daredevils; 141/8 (20 overs)

Punjab won by 29 runs
HPCA Stadium, Dharamsala (Group A)

15 May (D/N)
Scorecard

Rajasthan Royals; 97 (18.3 overs)	v	Kochi Tuskers Kerala (H); 98/2 (7.2 overs)

Kochi won by 8 wickets
Holkar Cricket Stadium, Indore (Group B)

16 May (D/N)
Scorecard

(H) Pune Warriors India; 136/9 (20 overs)	v	Deccan Chargers; 138/4 (19.2 overs)

Deccan won by 6 wickets
DY Patil Stadium, Navi Mumbai (Group A)

17 May (D/N)
Scorecard

(H) Kings XI Punjab; 232/2 (20 overs)	v	Royal Challengers Bangalore; 121 (17 overs)

Punjab won by 111 runs
HPCA Stadium, Dharamsala (Group A vs Group B)

18 May (D/N)
Scorecard

(H) Chennai Super Kings; 152/5 (20 overs)	v	Kochi Tuskers Kerala; 141/5 (20 overs)

Chennai won by 11 runs
M. A. Chidambaram Stadium, Chennai (Group B)

19 May (D/N)
Scorecard

(H) Pune Warriors India; 118/7 (20 overs)	v	Kolkata Knight Riders; 119/3 (16.4 overs)

Kolkata won by 7 wickets
DY Patil Stadium, Navi Mumbai (Group A vs Group B)

20 May (D/N)
Scorecard

(H) Mumbai Indians; 133/5 (20 overs)	v	Rajasthan Royals; 134/0 (13.1 overs)

Rajasthan won by 10 wickets
Wankhede Stadium, Mumbai (Group A vs Group B)

21 May
Scorecard

Deccan Chargers; 198/2 (20 overs)	v	Kings XI Punjab (H); 116 (19 overs)

Deccan won by 82 runs
HPCA Stadium, Dharamsala (Group A)

21 May (D/N)
Scorecard

(H) Delhi Daredevils; 56/3 (10.1 overs)	v	Pune Warriors India

No result
Feroz Shah Kotla, Delhi (Group A)

22 May
Scorecard

Chennai Super Kings; 128/8 (20 overs)	v	Royal Challengers Bangalore (H); 129/2 (18 overs)

Bangalore won by 8 wickets
M. Chinnaswamy Stadium, Bangalore (Group B)

22 May (D/N)
Scorecard

(H) Kolkata Knight Riders; 175/7 (20 overs)	v	Mumbai Indians; 178/5 (20 overs)

Mumbai won by 5 wickets
Eden Gardens, Kolkata (Group B vs Group A)

== Playoffs ==
Qualifier 1 / Eliminator
24 May 2011 - Mumbai
1	Royal Challengers Bangalore	175/4 (20 overs)
2	Chennai Super Kings	177/4 (19.4 overs)
25 May 2011 - Mumbai
3	Mumbai Indians	148/6 (19.2 overs)
4	Kolkata Knight Riders	147/7 (20 overs)

Qualifier 2
27 May 2011 - Chennai
Q1L	Royal Challengers Bangalore	185/4 (20 overs)
EW	Mumbai Indians	142/8 (20 overs)

Final
28 May 2011 - Chennai
Q1W	Chennai Super Kings	205/5 (20 overs)
Q2W	Royal Challengers Bangalore	147/8 (20 overs)

=== Qualifier 1 ===
24 May 2011
20:00 (D/N)
Scorecard

Royal Challengers Bangalore; 175/4 (20 overs)	v	Chennai Super Kings; 177/4 (19.4 overs)
Virat Kohli 70* (44); Doug Bollinger 1/20 (4 overs)		Suresh Raina 73* (50); Zaheer Khan 2/31 (4 overs)

Chennai won by 6 wickets
Wankhede Stadium, Mumbai
Umpires: Asad Rauf (Pak) and Simon Taufel (Aus)
Player of the match: Suresh Raina (CSK)

- Chennai Super Kings won the toss and elected to field.

=== Eliminator ===
25 May 2011
20:00 (D/N)
Scorecard

Kolkata Knight Riders; 147/7 (20 overs)	v	Mumbai Indians; 148/6 (19.2 overs)
Ryan ten Doeschate 70* (49); Munaf Patel 3/27 (4 overs)		Aiden Blizzard 51 (30); Jacques Kallis 2/18 (4 overs)

Mumbai won by 4 wickets
Wankhede Stadium, Mumbai
Umpires: Simon Taufel (Aus) and Asad Rauf (Pak)
Player of the match: Munaf Patel (MI)

- Mumbai Indians won the toss and elected to field.

=== Qualifier 2 ===
27 May 2011
20:00 (D/N)
Scorecard

Royal Challengers Bangalore; 185/4 (20 overs)	v	Mumbai Indians; 142/8 (20 overs)
Chris Gayle 90 (47); Munaf Patel 2/27 (4 overs)		Sachin Tendulkar 40 (24); Daniel Vettori 3/19 (4 overs)

Bangalore won by 43 runs
M. A. Chidambaram Stadium, Chennai
Umpires: Asad Rauf (Pak) and Simon Taufel (Aus)
Player of the match: Chris Gayle (RCB)

- Mumbai Indians won the toss and elected to field.

=== Final ===
28 May 2011
20:00 (D/N)
Scorecard

Chennai Super Kings; 205/5 (20 overs)	v	Royal Challengers Bangalore; 147/8 (20 overs)
Murali Vijay 95 (52); Chris Gayle 2/34 (4 overs)		Saurabh Tiwary 42* (34); Ravichandran Ashwin 3/16 (4 overs)

Chennai won by 58 runs
M. A. Chidambaram Stadium, Chennai
Umpires: Simon Taufel (Aus) and Asad Rauf (Pak)
Player of the match: Murali Vijay (CSK)

- Chennai Super Kings won the toss and elected to bat.

== Statistics ==
=== Most runs ===
Player	Team	Runs	Inns	Mat	HS
Chris Gayle	Royal Challengers Bangalore	608	12	12	107
Virat Kohli	Royal Challengers Bangalore	557	16	16	71
Sachin Tendulkar	Mumbai Indians	553	16	16	100 not out
Shaun Marsh	Kings XI Punjab	504	13	14	95
Michael Hussey	Chennai Super Kings	492	14	14	83 not out

The leading scorer of the league phase wore an orange cap when fielding.

=== Most wickets ===
Player	Team	Wkts	Mat	BBI
Lasith Malinga	Mumbai Indians	28	16	5/13
Munaf Patel	Mumbai Indians	22	15	5/21
Sreenath Aravind	Royal Challengers Bangalore	21	13	4/14
Ravichandran Ashwin	Chennai Super Kings	20	16	3/16
Amit Mishra	Deccan Chargers	19	14	4/9

The tournament's leading wicket taker wore a purple cap when fielding.
