= Prasanth Parameswaran =

Indian cricketer (born 1985)

Personal information
- Full name: Prasanth Parameswaran
- Born: 30 May 1985 (age 41); Kayippuram, Cherthala, Kerala, India
- Nickname: Puli
- Height: 6 ft 3 in (1.91 m)
- Batting: Right-handed
- Bowling: Left-arm fast-medium
- Role: Bowler

Domestic team information
- Years: Team
- 2007–present: Kerala
- 2011: Kochi Tuskers Kerala
- 2012: Royal Challengers Bangalore
- Source: ESPNcricinfo, 4 May 2011

Prasanth Parameswaran (born 30 May 1985) is an Indian cricketer. He is a left-arm, medium pace bowler and a right-handed batsman. In first class cricket, he plays for Kerala and in the Indian Premier League. He used to play for Kochi Tuskers Kerala and was picked up by Sunrisers Hyderabad . He is the first Kerala player to earn the award Man of the match title in IPL debut.

Prasanth came to the training camp of Kochi Tuskers Kerala as a net practice bowler for their batsmen. But he impressed the chief coach Geoff Lawson and got selected to the same team for IPL Season 4.

In May 2011, he made his IPL debut for Kochi Tuskers Kerala against Delhi Daredevils and picked up the wicket of Virender Sehwag in his first over. He bagged one more wicket and secured Man of the Match by leading Kochi Tuskers Kerala to a comfortable win.

He was called by the Kolkata Knight Riders team for selection trials, but was not picked.

Prasanth was a good hammer-thrower at school and participated in Kerala's high-profile school athletics meet. He started his cricket career by playing for CMS College Kottayam in college. He shifted to St. Albert's College, Kochi for better training. He was trained at BPCL Kochi Refineries Cricket Academy by former Ranji coach P. Balachandran. Prasanth made rapid progress, which led him to Kerala cricket team for Ranji Trophy.

He was picked by Indian Overseas Bank, Chennai to play for them at TNCA cricket league. He was picked for the South Zone cricket team for Duleep and Deodhar Trophy competitions.

He worked as an officer with Chemplast Sanmar Limited, Chennai.

He contracted with Kochi Tuskers Kerala for 20 lakh rupees. He was signed by RCB due to the injury of their pace bowler Sreenath Aravind. His over to Chris Gayle in IPL 2011 stood as the most expensive in the history of T20 cricket. Chris Gayle scored 37 from 6 balls (4 sixes 3 fours + 1 no ball) in Royal Challenger Bangalore versus Kochi Tuskers Kerala match. He was picked up by Sunrisers Hyderabad in the IPL 2014 auction for 30 lakhs.

He got selected to play in the south zone team of Deodhar trophy 2014. He was the South zone Selector for BCCI in 2019. He is the bowling coach for Tamil Nadu Premier league.

== Personal life ==
He is married to actress Shivani Bhai in 2011. The family lives in Chennai. The couple have one son named Ishan Puthra P.Parameswaran

== See also ==
- Parameswaran bent his back and bowled well: Mahela
- Mahela Jayawardene delighted as Prasanth Parameswaran keeps cool against Delhi Daredevils.
