= Sudhir Asnani =

Indian cricket umpire (born 1960)

Personal information
- Born: 7 December 1960 (age 65); Bhopal, Madhya Pradesh

Umpiring information
- ODIs umpired: 10 (1998–2013)
- T20Is umpired: 4 (2011–2012)
- WODIs umpired: 1 (1997)
- WT20Is umpired: 2 (2008)
- FC umpired: 70 (1992–2012)
- LA umpired: 42 (1993–2012)
- Source: ESPNCricinfo, 10 August 2012

Sudhir Asnani (born 7 December 1960 in Bhopal, Madhya Pradesh) is an international cricket umpire from India. Making his international umpiring debut in 1998, he has officiated in ten One Day Internationals, four Twenty20 Internationals and over 100 First-class and List A matches. He has also stood in 23 Indian Premier League matches.

== See also ==
- List of One Day International cricket umpires
- List of Twenty20 International cricket umpires
