= Raiphi Gomez =

Indian first class cricketer (born 1985)

Personal information
- Full name: Raiphi Vincent Gomez
- Born: 16 October 1985 (age 41)
- Batting: Right-handed
- Bowling: Right-arm fast-medium
- Role: Allrounder

Domestic team information
- Years: Team
- 2005–2017: Kerala
- 2009: Rajasthan Royals
- 2011: Kochi Tuskers Kerala
- 2013: Pune Warriors India
- 2018–2019: Puducherry

Career statistics
Competition	FC	LA	T20
Matches	41	51	62
Runs scored	1,258	1,261	774
Batting average	21.68	30.02	21.50
100s/50s	2/5	1/9	0/2
Top score	108	105	62*
Balls bowled	2,853	1,179	588
Wickets	40	19	20
Bowling average	31.85	51.73	38.25
5 wickets in innings	0	0	0
10 wickets in match	0	0	0
Best bowling	4/58	3/51	2/8
Catches/stumpings	21/–	9/–	26/–
- Source: ESPNcricinfo, 7 May 2022

Raiphi Vincent Gomez (born 16 October 1985) is an Indian cricketer who played for Kerala and Puducherry in domestic cricket. He is an all-rounder who bats right-handed and bowls right arm medium-fast. He was bought by Rajasthan Royals ahead of the 2009 season of Indian Premier League making him the second Kerala player to be part of an IPL franchise after Sreesanth. Raiphi has also represented India U-17 team and India U-19 team.

Gomez represented Kochi Tuskers Kerala in IPL 2011. After KTK's termination, he was selected to play for Pune Warriors India in the 5th edition of IPL.

In December 2018, he was selected for cricket association of Pondicherry as a guest player in Ranji Trophy.
