= Shavir Tarapore =

Indian cricket umpire (born 1957)

Personal information
- Full name: Shavir Keki Tarapore
- Born: 26 December 1957 (age 68); Calcutta, India
- Batting: Right-handed
- Bowling: Right-arm leg break
- Role: Umpire

Umpiring information
- Tests umpired: 4 (2011–2011)
- ODIs umpired: 25 (1999–2012)
- T20Is umpired: 3 (2009–2010)
- WODIs umpired: 2 (1997–2003)
- WT20Is umpired: 4 (2010)

Career statistics
Competition	First-class
Matches	6
Runs scored	20
Batting average	5.00
100s/50s	0/0
Top score	15
Balls bowled	474
Wickets	9
Bowling average	37.66
5 wickets in innings	0
10 wickets in match	0
Best bowling	2/38
Catches/stumpings	3/–
- Source: Cricinfo, 26 September 2012

Shavir Tarapore (born 26 December 1957) is an Indian Test, One Day International (ODI) and Twenty20 International (T20I) cricket umpire, who has umpired in 4 Tests, 25 ODIs and 3 T20Is, as of 2014.

Tarapore first stood in an ODI in 1999.

He also played a few games for Karnataka in a career spanning from 1980/81 to 1986/87. He played 6 matches, scoring 20 runs with a high score of 15. He also picked up 9 wickets with his legbreaks at an average of 37.66. He took 3 catches in those 6 games.

Shavir Tarapore was inducted into the ICC's International Panel of Umpires, as a replacement for Suresh Shastri.

His father Keki Tarapore was Indian cricketer Rahul Dravid's childhood coach.

== See also ==
- List of Test cricket umpires
- List of One Day International cricket umpires
- List of Twenty20 International cricket umpires
