= Sreenath Aravind =

Indian cricketer (born 1984)

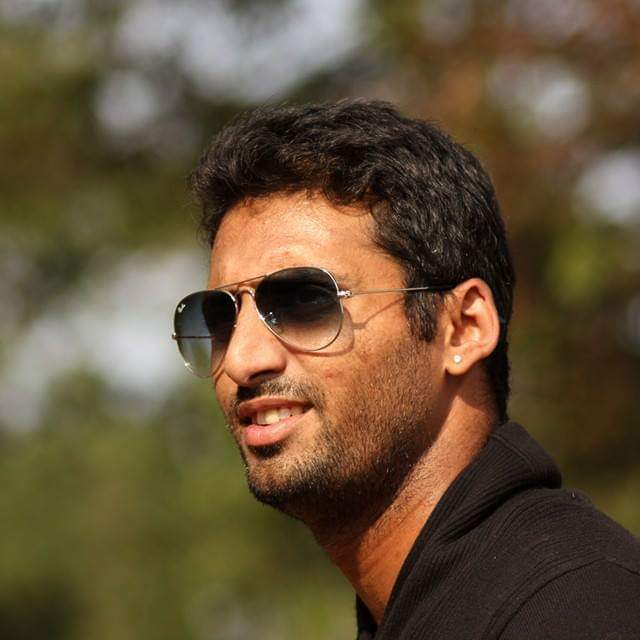

Personal information
- Born: 8 April 1984 (age 42); Bangalore, Karnataka, India
- Height: 6 ft 0 in (1.83 m)
- Batting: Left-handed
- Bowling: Left-arm medium-fast
- Role: Bowler

International information
- National side: India (2015)
- Only T20I (cap 56): 2 October 2015 v South Africa
- T20I shirt no.: 9

Domestic team information
- Years: Team
- 2005–2017: Mangalore United (squad no. 9)
- 2009–2018: Karnataka (squad no. 9)
- 2011–2017: Royal Challengers Bangalore (squad no. 9)

Career statistics
Competition	T20I	FC	LA	T20
Matches	1	56	41	84
Runs scored	–	455	107	105
Batting average	–	13.00	8.23	11.66
100s/50s	–	0/2	0/0	0/0
Top score	–	51*	38*	14*
Balls bowled	22	10,301	1,949	1,714
Wickets	1	186	57	103
Bowling average	44.00	23.94	25.26	21.77
5 wickets in innings	0	2	0	0
10 wickets in match	0	0	0	0
Best bowling	1/44	5/49	4/41	4/14
Catches/stumpings	0/–	17/–	11/–	24/–
- Source: ESPNcricinfo, 15 October 2020

Sreenath Aravind (Kannada: ಅರವಿಂದ್ ಶ್ರಿನಾಥ್) (born 8 April 1984) is a former Indian cricketer who played for Karnataka and the Royal Challengers Bangalore. He made his Twenty20 International debut for India against South Africa on 2 October 2015.

== International career ==
A left-arm quick bowler, Aravind was called up to India's One Day International squad for the series against England in October 2011 but suffered an injury and did not play.

Aravind made his Twenty20 International debut for India against South Africa on 2 October 2015, taking the wicket of Faf du Plessis. This was Aravind's only international appearance.

== Domestic and franchise career ==
Aravind made his debut in the IPL 2011 Season for the Royal Challengers Bangalore (RCB). He finished as RCB's leading wicket taker, taking 21 wickets in 13 matches at an impressive economy of 8.00, while averaging 17.52. On 6 May 2011, Aravind achieved his career-best bowling figures, taking 4/14 against the Punjab Kings, while maintaining an exceptional economy of 3.50.

In the 2011 Champions League Twenty20, Aravind played in six matches as his team, the Royal Challengers, made it to the final, losing to the Mumbai Indians.

Aravind overcame a career-threatening accident a couple of years ago and made his first-class debut in 2008. He is known for his ability to bowl both left arm fast and left arm spin.

== Retirement ==
On 27 February 2018, after winning the Vijay Hazare trophy final, Aravind announced his retirement from all forms of cricket.
