= 2010 Deccan Chargers season =

Indian cricket team season

Deccan Chargers
2010 season
- Coach: Darren Lehmann
- Captain: Adam Gilchrist
- Ground(s): Rajiv Gandhi International Cricket Stadium, Hyderabad (Capacity: 55,000) (Note: The home-matches of the Deccan Chargers for the 2010 IPL were not conducted in Hyderabad and were shifted to the multiple stadiums.)
- IPL: Knockout stage (4th)
- Most runs: Andrew Symonds (429)
- Most wickets: Pragyan Ojha (21)
- Most catches: Andrew Symonds (12)
- Most wicket-keeping dismissals: Adam Gilchrist (13)

The Deccan Chargers (DC) were a franchise cricket team based in Hyderabad, India, that competed in the Indian Premier League (IPL), a professional Twenty20 cricket (T20) league in India. They were one of the eight teams that competed in the 2010 Indian Premier League, making their third appearance in all IPL tournaments. The team was captained by Adam Gilchrist and coached by Darren Lehmann with Kanwaljit Singh and Mike Young as assistant coaches.

They began their season by losing their opening fixture of the IPL on 12 March against the Kolkata Knight Riders but five consecutive wins at the end of the group stage helped them to qualify for the semi-finals. They lost to Chennai Super Kings by 38 runs in the semi-final and to Royal Challengers Bangalore by 9 wickets in the third-place playoff to finish the tournament at fourth and failed to qualify for the 2010 Champions League Twenty20.

== Player acquisition ==
Players retained: Azhar Bilakhia, Ravi Teja Dwaraka, Herschelle Gibbs, Adam Gilchrist, Ryan Harris, Pragyan Ojha, Rohit Sharma, Jaskaran Singh, R. P. Singh, Dwayne Smith, Andrew Symonds, Suman Tirumalasetti, V. V. S. Laxman, Chaminda Vaas, Arjun Yadav, Venugopal Rao Yalaka

Players released: Shoaib Ahmed, Harmeet Singh Bansal, Manvinder Bisla, Halhadar Das, Kalyankrishna Doddapaneni, Fidel Edwards, Abhinav Kumar, Sarvesh Kumar, Vijaykumar Paidikalva, Chamara Silva, Scott Styris, Nuwan Zoysa

Players added: Harmeet Singh Bansal, Sumanth Bodapati, Mitchell Marsh, Mohnish Mishra, Ashish Reddy, Kemar Roach, Rahul Sharma, Anirudh Singh

== Squad ==
- Players with international caps are listed in **bold**.
- **Year signed** denotes the season the player signed for the team

Name	Nationality	Birth date	Batting style	Bowling style	Year signed	Notes
Batsmen
Azhar Bilakhia	India	31 May 1986 (aged 23)	Right-handed	Right-arm medium fast	2009	
Sumanth Bodapati	India	10 May 1988 (aged 21)	Right-handed	Right-arm medium fast	2010	
Ravi Teja Dwaraka	India	5 September 1988 (aged 21)	Right-handed	Right-arm leg break	2008	
**Herschelle Gibbs**	South Africa	23 February 1974 (aged 36)	Right-handed	Right-arm medium fast	2008	Overseas.
Mohnish Mishra	India	9 February 1984 (aged 26)	Right-handed	Right-arm off break	2010	
**Rohit Sharma**	India	30 April 1987 (aged 22)	Right-handed	Right-arm off break	2008	Vice-captain.
Suman Tirumalasetti	India	15 December 1983 (aged 26)	Right-handed	Right-arm off break	2009	
**V. V. S. Laxman**	India	1 November 1974 (aged 35)	Right-handed	Right-arm off spin	2008	
Anirudh Singh	India	2 August 1980 (aged 29)	Left-handed	Right-arm medium fast	2010	
Arjun Yadav	India	23 December 1981 (aged 28)	Right-handed	Right-arm off break	2008	
**Venugopal Rao Yalaka**	India	26 February 1982 (aged 28)	Right-handed	Right-arm off spin	2008	
All-rounders
**Ryan Harris**	Australia	11 October 1979 (aged 30)	Right-handed	Right-arm fast	2009	Overseas.
Mitchell Marsh	Australia	20 October 1991 (aged 18)	Right-handed	Right-arm medium fast	2010	Overseas.
Ashish Reddy	India	24 February 1991 (aged 19)	Right-handed	Right-arm medium fast	2010	
**Dwayne Smith**	West Indies	12 April 1983 (aged 26)	Right-handed	Right-arm medium fast	2009	Overseas.
**Andrew Symonds**	Australia	9 June 1975 (aged 34)	Right-handed	Right-arm off break	2008	Overseas.
Wicket-keepers
**Adam Gilchrist**	Australia	14 November 1971 (aged 38)	Left-handed	Right-arm off break	2008	Overseas and Captain.
Bowlers
Harmeet Singh Bansal	India	9 October 1987 (aged 22)	Right-handed	Right-arm medium fast	2009	
**Pragyan Ojha**	India	5 September 1986 (aged 23)	Left-handed	Slow left-arm orthodox	2008	
**Kemar Roach**	West Indies	30 June 1988 (aged 21)	Right-handed	Right-arm fast	2010	Overseas.
Rahul Sharma	India	30 November 1986 (aged 23)	Right-handed	Right-arm leg break	2010	
Jaskaran Singh	India	4 September 1989 (aged 20)	Right-handed	Right-arm medium fast	2009	
**R. P. Singh**	India	6 December 1985 (aged 24)	Right-handed	Left-arm medium fast	2008	
**Chaminda Vaas**	Sri Lanka	27 January 1974 (aged 36)	Left-handed	Left-arm medium fast	2008	Overseas.

== Kit manufacturers and sponsors ==
Kit Manufacturers	Shirt Sponsor (Chest)	Shirt Sponsor (Back)	Chest Branding
Puma	Idea Cellular	Deccan Chronicle	McDowell's No.1
Source :

T20 uniform

== Season overview ==
=== Standings ===
Pos	Team	Pld	W	L	NR	Pts	NRR
1	Mumbai Indians (R)	14	10	4	0	20	1.084
2	Deccan Chargers(4th)	14	8	6	0	16	−0.297
3	Chennai Super Kings (C)	14	7	7	0	14	0.274
4	Royal Challengers Bangalore (3rd)	14	7	7	0	14	0.219
5	Delhi Daredevils	14	7	7	0	14	0.021
6	Kolkata Knight Riders	14	7	7	0	14	−0.341
7	Rajasthan Royals	14	6	8	0	12	−0.514
8	Kings XI Punjab	14	4	10	0	8	−0.478

(C) = Champion; (R) = Runner-up; (3rd) = Winner of third place playoff.
Note: Top four teams will qualify for the playoffs.
Note: The winner, runner-up and winner of the third place playoff qualified for the 2010 Champions League Twenty20.

=== Results by match ===
Round	1	2	3	4	5	6	7	8	9	10	11	12	13	14
Ground	H	A	H	H	A	H	A	A	H	A	H	H	A	A
Result	L	W	W	W	L	L	L	L	L	W	W	W	W	W

Source: Fixtures
A = Away; H = Home; W = Win; D = Draw; L = Loss

== Fixtures ==
All times are in Indian Standard Time (UTC+05:30)

=== Group stage ===
12 March	Kolkata Knight Riders; 161/4 (20 overs)	v	Deccan Chargers (H); 150/7 (20 overs)	Kolkata Knight Riders won by 11 runs
20:00 (D/N) Round 1 Scorecard	Kolkata Knight Riders; 161/4 (20 overs)	v	Deccan Chargers (H); 150/7 (20 overs)	DY Patil Stadium, Mumbai; Umpires: Rudi Koertzen and Russell Tiffin; Player of the match: Angelo Mathews (Kolkata Knight Riders)
20:00 (D/N) Round 1 Scorecard	Angelo Mathews 65* (46b, 5x4, 4x6); Chaminda Vaas 2/22 (3 overs)		Adam Gilchrist 54 (35b, 3x4, 3x6); Charl Langeveldt 2/26 (4 overs)	DY Patil Stadium, Mumbai; Umpires: Rudi Koertzen and Russell Tiffin; Player of the match: Angelo Mathews (Kolkata Knight Riders)
Deccan Chargers won the toss and chose to bowl first.				DY Patil Stadium, Mumbai; Umpires: Rudi Koertzen and Russell Tiffin; Player of the match: Angelo Mathews (Kolkata Knight Riders)

14 March	Deccan Chargers; 190/4 (20 overs)	v	Chennai Super Kings (H); 159/9 (20 overs)	Deccan Chargers won by 31 runs
20:00 (D/N) Round 2 Scorecard	Deccan Chargers; 190/4 (20 overs)	v	Chennai Super Kings (H); 159/9 (20 overs)	M. A. Chidambaram Stadium, Chennai; Umpires: Daryl Harper and K. Hariharan; Player of the match: Chaminda Vaas (Deccan Chargers)
20:00 (D/N) Round 2 Scorecard	Andrew Symonds 50 (43b, 3x4, 3x6); Ravichandran Ashwin 1/26 (4 overs)		Albie Morkel 42* (26b, 1x4, 3x6); Chaminda Vaas 3/21 (4 overs)	M. A. Chidambaram Stadium, Chennai; Umpires: Daryl Harper and K. Hariharan; Player of the match: Chaminda Vaas (Deccan Chargers)
Deccan Chargers won the toss and chose to bat first.				M. A. Chidambaram Stadium, Chennai; Umpires: Daryl Harper and K. Hariharan; Player of the match: Chaminda Vaas (Deccan Chargers)

19 March	(H) Deccan Chargers; 170/7 (20 overs)	v	Kings XI Punjab; 164/8 (20 overs)	Deccan Chargers won by 6 runs
20:00 (D/N) Round 3 Scorecard	(H) Deccan Chargers; 170/7 (20 overs)	v	Kings XI Punjab; 164/8 (20 overs)	Barabati Stadium, Cuttack; Umpires: Billy Bowden and Marais Erasmus; Player of the match: Andrew Symonds (Deccan Chargers)
20:00 (D/N) Round 3 Scorecard	Andrew Symonds 53 (38b, 3x4, 3x6); Yuvraj Singh 2/21 (4 overs)		Irfan Pathan 60 (29b, 3x4, 5x6); Chaminda Vaas 2/27 (4 overs)	Barabati Stadium, Cuttack; Umpires: Billy Bowden and Marais Erasmus; Player of the match: Andrew Symonds (Deccan Chargers)
Kings XI Punjab won the toss and chose to bowl first.				Barabati Stadium, Cuttack; Umpires: Billy Bowden and Marais Erasmus; Player of the match: Andrew Symonds (Deccan Chargers)

21 March	(H) Deccan Chargers; 171/6 (20 overs)	v	Delhi Daredevils; 161/9 (20 overs)	Deccan Chargers won by 10 runs
16:00 Round 4 Scorecard	(H) Deccan Chargers; 171/6 (20 overs)	v	Delhi Daredevils; 161/9 (20 overs)	Barabati Stadium, Cuttack; Umpires: Billy Bowden and Marais Erasmus; Player of the match: Andrew Symonds (Deccan Chargers)
16:00 Round 4 Scorecard	Rohit Sharma 45 (30b, 3x4, 3x6); Amit Mishra 1/12 (3 overs)		David Warner 57 (33b, 4x4, 4x6); Andrew Symonds 3/21 (4 overs)	Barabati Stadium, Cuttack; Umpires: Billy Bowden and Marais Erasmus; Player of the match: Andrew Symonds (Deccan Chargers)
Deccan Chargers won the toss and chose to bat first.				Barabati Stadium, Cuttack; Umpires: Billy Bowden and Marais Erasmus; Player of the match: Andrew Symonds (Deccan Chargers)

26 March	Deccan Chargers; 148/9 (20 overs)	v	Rajasthan Royals (H); 151/2 (15.4 overs)	Rajasthan Royals won by 8 wickets
20:00 (D/N) Round 5 Scorecard	Deccan Chargers; 148/9 (20 overs)	v	Rajasthan Royals (H); 151/2 (15.4 overs)	Sardar Patel Stadium, Ahmedabad; Umpires: Simon Taufel and Kumar Dharmasena; Player of the match: Yusuf Pathan (Rajasthan Royals)
20:00 (D/N) Round 5 Scorecard	Rohit Sharma 49 (35b, 2x4, 3x6); Shaun Tait 3/22 (4 overs)		Yusuf Pathan 73* (34b, 2x4, 8x6); Pragyan Ojha 1/40 (3 overs)	Sardar Patel Stadium, Ahmedabad; Umpires: Simon Taufel and Kumar Dharmasena; Player of the match: Yusuf Pathan (Rajasthan Royals)
Deccan Chargers won the toss and chose to bat first.				Sardar Patel Stadium, Ahmedabad; Umpires: Simon Taufel and Kumar Dharmasena; Player of the match: Yusuf Pathan (Rajasthan Royals)

28 March	Mumbai Indians; 172/7 (20 overs)	v	Deccan Chargers (H); 131 (17.4 overs)	Mumbai Indians won by 41 runs
20:00 (D/N) Round 6 Scorecard	Mumbai Indians; 172/7 (20 overs)	v	Deccan Chargers (H); 131 (17.4 overs)	DY Patil Stadium, Mumbai; Umpires: K. Hariharan and Subroto Das; Player of the match: Harbhajan Singh (Mumbai Indians)
20:00 (D/N) Round 6 Scorecard	Sachin Tendulkar 55 (43b, 9x4, 0x6); R. P. Singh 3/31 (4 overs)		Rohit Sharma 45 (28b, 3x4, 2x6); Lasith Malinga 3/12 (3.4 overs)	DY Patil Stadium, Mumbai; Umpires: K. Hariharan and Subroto Das; Player of the match: Harbhajan Singh (Mumbai Indians)
Deccan Chargers won the toss and chose to bowl first.				DY Patil Stadium, Mumbai; Umpires: K. Hariharan and Subroto Das; Player of the match: Harbhajan Singh (Mumbai Indians)

1 April	(H) Kolkata Knight Riders; 181/6 (20 overs)	v	Deccan Chargers; 157/5 (20 overs)	Kolkata Knight Riders won by 24 runs
20:00 (D/N) Round 7 Scorecard	(H) Kolkata Knight Riders; 181/6 (20 overs)	v	Deccan Chargers; 157/5 (20 overs)	Eden Gardens, Kolkata; Umpires: Daryl Harper and K. Hariharan; Player of the match: Saurav Ganguly (Kolkata Knight Riders)
20:00 (D/N) Round 7 Scorecard	Sourav Ganguly 88 (54b, 9x4, 5x6); Jaskaran Singh 2/18 (3 overs)		Herschelle Gibbs 50 (45b, 5x4, 1x6); Chris Gayle 1/9 (1 over)	Eden Gardens, Kolkata; Umpires: Daryl Harper and K. Hariharan; Player of the match: Saurav Ganguly (Kolkata Knight Riders)
Kolkata Knight Riders won the toss and chose to bat first.				Eden Gardens, Kolkata; Umpires: Daryl Harper and K. Hariharan; Player of the match: Saurav Ganguly (Kolkata Knight Riders)

3 April	(H) Mumbai Indians; 178/5 (20 overs)	v	Deccan Chargers; 115 (18.2 overs)	Mumbai Indians won by 63 runs
20:00 (D/N) Round 8 Scorecard	(H) Mumbai Indians; 178/5 (20 overs)	v	Deccan Chargers; 115 (18.2 overs)	Brabourne Stadium, Mumbai; Umpires: Billy Doctrove and S. Ravi; Player of the match: Ambati Rayudu (Mumbai Indians)
20:00 (D/N) Round 8 Scorecard	Ambati Rayudu 55* (29b, 6x4, 2x6); Pragyan Ojha 3/26 (4 overs)		Andrew Symonds 21(18b, 2x4, 0x6); Zaheer Khan 2/10 (2 overs)	Brabourne Stadium, Mumbai; Umpires: Billy Doctrove and S. Ravi; Player of the match: Ambati Rayudu (Mumbai Indians)
Mumbai Indians won the toss and chose to bat first.				Brabourne Stadium, Mumbai; Umpires: Billy Doctrove and S. Ravi; Player of the match: Ambati Rayudu (Mumbai Indians)

5 April	Rajasthan Royals; 159 (19.5 overs)	v	Deccan Chargers (H); 157 (19.5 overs)	Rajasthan Royals won by 2 runs
20:00 (D/N) Round 9 Scorecard	Rajasthan Royals; 159 (19.5 overs)	v	Deccan Chargers (H); 157 (19.5 overs)	Vidarbha Cricket Association Stadium, Jamtha, Nagpur; Umpires: Kumar Dharmasena and Simon Taufel; Player of the match: Shane Warne (Rajasthan Royals)
20:00 (D/N) Round 9 Scorecard	Shane Watson 58 (36b, 3x4, 3x6); R. P. Singh 3/17 (4 overs)		Rohit Sharma 73 (44b, 8x4, 2x6); Shane Warne 4/21 (4 overs)	Vidarbha Cricket Association Stadium, Jamtha, Nagpur; Umpires: Kumar Dharmasena and Simon Taufel; Player of the match: Shane Warne (Rajasthan Royals)
Rajasthan Royals won the toss and elected to bat first.				Vidarbha Cricket Association Stadium, Jamtha, Nagpur; Umpires: Kumar Dharmasena and Simon Taufel; Player of the match: Shane Warne (Rajasthan Royals)

8 April	(H) Royal Challengers Bangalore; 184/6 (20 overs)	v	Deccan Chargers; 186/3 (19.2 overs)	Deccan Chargers won by 7 wickets
20:00 (D/N) Round 10 Scorecard	(H) Royal Challengers Bangalore; 184/6 (20 overs)	v	Deccan Chargers; 186/3 (19.2 overs)	M Chinnaswamy Stadium, Bangalore; Umpires: Daryl Harper and Sudhir Asnani; Player of the match: Tirumalasetti Suman (Deccan Chargers)
20:00 (D/N) Round 10 Scorecard	Jacques Kallis 68 (44b, 9x4, 1x6); Pragyan Ojha 2/24 (4 overs)		Tirumalasetti Suman 78* (57b, 6x4, 3x6); Praveen Kumar 1/37 (4 overs)	M Chinnaswamy Stadium, Bangalore; Umpires: Daryl Harper and Sudhir Asnani; Player of the match: Tirumalasetti Suman (Deccan Chargers)
Deccan Chargers won the toss and chose to bowl first.				M Chinnaswamy Stadium, Bangalore; Umpires: Daryl Harper and Sudhir Asnani; Player of the match: Tirumalasetti Suman (Deccan Chargers)

10 April	Chennai Super Kings; 138/8 (20 overs)	v	Deccan Chargers (H); 139/4 (19.1 overs)	Deccan Chargers won by 6 wickets
16:00 Round 11 Scorecard	Chennai Super Kings; 138/8 (20 overs)	v	Deccan Chargers (H); 139/4 (19.1 overs)	Vidarbha Cricket Association Stadium, Jamtha, Nagpur; Umpires: Kumar Dharmasena and Simon Taufel; Player of the match: Ryan Harris (Deccan Chargers)
16:00 Round 11 Scorecard	Suresh Raina 52 (42b, 4x4, 2x6); Ryan Harris 3/18 (4 overs)		Tirumalasetti Suman 55 (44b, 4x4, 2x6); Ravichandran Ashwin 2/13 (4 overs)	Vidarbha Cricket Association Stadium, Jamtha, Nagpur; Umpires: Kumar Dharmasena and Simon Taufel; Player of the match: Ryan Harris (Deccan Chargers)
Chennai Super Kings won the toss and elected to bat first.				Vidarbha Cricket Association Stadium, Jamtha, Nagpur; Umpires: Kumar Dharmasena and Simon Taufel; Player of the match: Ryan Harris (Deccan Chargers)

12 April	(H) Deccan Chargers; 151/6 (20 overs)	v	Royal Challengers Bangalore; 138 (19.4 overs)	Deccan Chargers won by 13 runs
20:00 (D/N) Round 12 Scorecard	(H) Deccan Chargers; 151/6 (20 overs)	v	Royal Challengers Bangalore; 138 (19.4 overs)	Vidarbha Cricket Association Stadium, Jamtha, Nagpur; Umpires: Rudi Koertzen and Russell Tiffin; Player of the match: Harmeet Singh (Deccan Chargers)
20:00 (D/N) Round 12 Scorecard	Rohit Sharma 51 (46b, 7x4, 0x6); Dale Steyn 3/18 (4 overs)		Rahul Dravid 49 (35b, 8x4, 1x6); R. P. Singh 2/21 (4 overs)	Vidarbha Cricket Association Stadium, Jamtha, Nagpur; Umpires: Rudi Koertzen and Russell Tiffin; Player of the match: Harmeet Singh (Deccan Chargers)
Royal Challengers Bangalore won the toss and elected to bowl first.				Vidarbha Cricket Association Stadium, Jamtha, Nagpur; Umpires: Rudi Koertzen and Russell Tiffin; Player of the match: Harmeet Singh (Deccan Chargers)

16 April	(H) Kings XI Punjab; 174/3 (20 overs)	v	Deccan Chargers; 178/5 (19.1 overs)	Deccan Chargers won by 5 wickets
20:00 (D/N) Round 13 Scorecard	(H) Kings XI Punjab; 174/3 (20 overs)	v	Deccan Chargers; 178/5 (19.1 overs)	HPCA Cricket Stadium, Dharamsala; Umpires: Amiesh Saheba and Marais Erasmus; Player of the match: Rohit Sharma (Deccan Chargers)
20:00 (D/N) Round 13 Scorecard	Mahela Jayawardene 93* (62b, 13x4, 2x6); Ryan Harris 1/27 (4 overs)		Rohit Sharma 68* (38b, 6x4, 3x6); Piyush Chawla 1/24 (4 overs)	HPCA Cricket Stadium, Dharamsala; Umpires: Amiesh Saheba and Marais Erasmus; Player of the match: Rohit Sharma (Deccan Chargers)
Deccan Chargers won the toss and elected to field				HPCA Cricket Stadium, Dharamsala; Umpires: Amiesh Saheba and Marais Erasmus; Player of the match: Rohit Sharma (Deccan Chargers)

18 April	Deccan Chargers; 145/7 (20 overs)	v	Delhi Daredevils (H); 134/7 (20 overs)	Deccan Chargers won by 11 runs
20:00 (D/N) Round 14 Scorecard	Deccan Chargers; 145/7 (20 overs)	v	Delhi Daredevils (H); 134/7 (20 overs)	Feroz Shah Kotla, Delhi; Umpires: Billy Doctrove and Shavir Tarapore; Player of the match: Andrew Symonds (Deccan Chargers)
20:00 (D/N) Round 14 Scorecard	Andrew Symonds 54 (30b, 3x4, 5x6); Umesh Yadav 2/24 (4 overs)		Paul Collingwood 51* (42b, 1x4, 3x6); Pragyan Ojha 2/16 (4 overs)	Feroz Shah Kotla, Delhi; Umpires: Billy Doctrove and Shavir Tarapore; Player of the match: Andrew Symonds (Deccan Chargers)
Deccan Chargers won the toss and elected to bat				Feroz Shah Kotla, Delhi; Umpires: Billy Doctrove and Shavir Tarapore; Player of the match: Andrew Symonds (Deccan Chargers)

=== Knockout stage ===
Semi-final

22 April	Chennai Super Kings; 142/7 (20 overs)	v	Deccan Chargers; 104 (19.2 overs)	Chennai Super Kings won by 38 runs
20:00 (D/N) Semi-final 2 Scorecard	Chennai Super Kings; 142/7 (20 overs)	v	Deccan Chargers; 104 (19.2 overs)	DY Patil Stadium, Mumbai; Umpires: Billy Doctrove and Russell Tiffin; Player of the match: Doug Bollinger (Chennai Super Kings)
20:00 (D/N) Semi-final 2 Scorecard	Subramaniam Badrinath 37 (41b, 3x4, 1x6); Ryan Harris 3/29 (4 overs)		Andrew Symonds 23 (22b, 3x4, 0x6); Doug Bollinger 4/13 (4 overs)	DY Patil Stadium, Mumbai; Umpires: Billy Doctrove and Russell Tiffin; Player of the match: Doug Bollinger (Chennai Super Kings)
Chennai Super Kings won the toss and elected to bat				DY Patil Stadium, Mumbai; Umpires: Billy Doctrove and Russell Tiffin; Player of the match: Doug Bollinger (Chennai Super Kings)

Third-place playoff

24 April	Deccan Chargers; 82 (18.3 overs)	v	Royal Challengers Bangalore; 86/1 (13.5 overs)	Royal Challengers Bangalore won by 9 wickets
20:00 (D/N) Third place playoff Scorecard	Deccan Chargers; 82 (18.3 overs)	v	Royal Challengers Bangalore; 86/1 (13.5 overs)	DY Patil Stadium, Mumbai; Umpires: Rudi Koertzen and Simon Taufel; Player of the match: Anil Kumble (Royal Challengers Bangalore)
20:00 (D/N) Third place playoff Scorecard	Anirudh Singh 40 (39b, 4x4, 1x6); Anil Kumble 4/16 (3.3 overs)		Rahul Dravid 35* (30b, 5x4, 0x6); Rahul Sharma 1/24 (3 overs)	DY Patil Stadium, Mumbai; Umpires: Rudi Koertzen and Simon Taufel; Player of the match: Anil Kumble (Royal Challengers Bangalore)
Deccan Chargers won the toss and elected to bat				DY Patil Stadium, Mumbai; Umpires: Rudi Koertzen and Simon Taufel; Player of the match: Anil Kumble (Royal Challengers Bangalore)

== Statistics ==
Name	Mat	Runs	HS	Ave	SR	Wkts	BBI	Ave	Eco	Ct	St
Sumanth Bodapati	5	35	16	35.00	94.59	–	–	–	–	4	–
Suman Tirumalasetti	14	307	78*	34.11	119.45	0	–	–	12.00	3	–
Andrew Symonds	16	429	54	30.64	125.80	12	3/21	31.00	7.01	12	–
Rohit Sharma	16	404	73	28.85	133.77	2	1/19	76.50	8.05	9	–
Herschelle Gibbs	10	267	50	26.70	113.61	–	–	–	–	6	–
Adam Gilchrist	16	289	54	18.06	156.21	–	–	–	–	9	4
Anirudh Singh	5	63	40	15.75	95.45	–	–	–	–	3	–
Mohnish Mishra	11	166	41	15.09	115.27	–	–	–	–	1	–
Mitchell Marsh	3	28	15	14.00	93.33	2	1/19	44.00	8.80	0	–
V. V. S. Laxman	6	64	22	12.80	106.66	–	–	–	–	2	–
Ryan Harris	8	45	15	11.25	115.38	14	3/18	16.64	7.59	5	–
Dwayne Smith	3	22	13*	11.00	88.00	1	1/22	36.00	9.39	0	–
Kemar Roach	2	10	10	10.00	111.11	0	–	–	10.00	1	–
Rahul Sharma	6	29	14*	9.66	111.53	5	2/42	33.40	8.08	1	–
Venugopal Rao Yalaka	6	34	24	8.50	79.06	0	–	–	10.00	0	–
Jaskaran Singh	6	8	4*	8.00	72.72	6	2/18	23.16	9.92	0	–
Chaminda Vaas	6	30	16	7.50	88.23	9	3/21	15.44	6.31	0	–
R. P. Singh	12	9	4*	4.50	47.36	13	3/17	28.46	8.80	4	–
Azhar Bilakhia	1	2	2	2.00	50.00	–	–	–	–	1	–
Pragyan Ojha	16	3	2	1.00	37.50	21	3/26	20.42	7.29	4	–
Harmeet Singh Bansal	8	0	0*	0.00	0.00	8	2/24	21.75	7.25	0	–

Source: 2010 IPL Statistics Full Table on ESPNcricinfo

== Awards and achievements ==
=== Awards ===
Man of the Match

No.	Date	Player	Opponent	Venue	Result	Contribution	Ref
1	14 March 2010	Chaminda Vaas	Chennai Super Kings	Chennai	Won by 31 runs	3/21 (4 overs)	
2	19 March 2010	Andrew Symonds	Kings XI Punjab	Cuttack	Won by 6 runs	53 (38) & 1/22 (4 overs)	
3	21 March 2010	Andrew Symonds	Delhi Daredevils	Cuttack	Won by 10 runs	35 (24) & 3/21 (4 overs)	
4	8 April 2010	Tirumalasetti Suman	Royal Challengers Bangalore	Bangalore	Won by 7 wickets	78* (57)	
5	10 April 2010	Ryan Harris	Chennai Super Kings	Nagpur	Won by 6 wickets	3/18 (4 overs)	
6	12 April 2010	Harmeet Singh Bansal	Royal Challengers Bangalore	Nagpur	Won By 13 runs	2/24 (4 overs)	
7	16 April 2010	Rohit Sharma	Kings XI Punjab	Dharmasala	Won By 5 wickets	68* (38)	
8	18 April 2010	Andrew Symonds	Delhi Daredevils	Delhi	Won by 11 runs	54 (30)	

Season Awards

- Winner of the Purple Cap : Pragyan Ojha

=== Achievements ===
- Most maiden overs bowled in the 2010 IPL : Chaminda Vaas (2)
- Best bowling strike-rate in the 2010 IPL : Ryan Harris (13.14)
