= 2010 Mumbai Indians season =

Indian Premier League cricket team season

Mumbai Indians
2010 season
- Coach: Robin Singh
- Captain: Sachin Tendulkar; Dwayne Bravo (1 match)
- IPL: Runners-up
- CLT20: Group stage
- Most runs: Sachin Tendulkar (618)
- Most wickets: Harbhajan Singh (17)
- Most catches: Kieron Pollard (6)

Mumbai Indians were one of the eight teams that took part in the 2010 Indian Premier League. They were captained by Sachin Tendulkar. They finished as runners-up of the tournament after losing to Chennai Super Kings by 22 runs in the finals. With this, they qualified for the 2010 Champions League Twenty20, where they could not progress past the group stages.

== Background ==
Mumbai Indians had a dismal run in the 2009 edition of the IPL held in South Africa. They were placed at seven in the eight-team points table with just five wins from 14 matches. After the 2009 season, they trimmed their squad by releasing three overseas players in Luke Ronchi, Kyle Mills and Mohammad Ashraful along with several domestic players with an aim of building a new-look team for the 2010 season.

== Pre-season player signings ==
At the players auction on 19 January 2010, Mumbai Indians bought just one player - hard-hitting Trinidadian all-rounder Kieron Pollard - for a sum of $750,000. Pollard, who had a base price of $200,000, had to go into a secret tie-breaker as four franchises bid the maximum amount of $750,000 for him. Although the actual amount of the bid by the Mumbai Indians was undisclosed, reports claim that the franchise bid as much as $2.75 million in the tie-breaker. However, according to IPL regulations, Pollard would be paid only the actual bidding amount with the rest of the money going into the IPL kitty.

Apart from Pollard, the Mumbai franchise bought a number of Indian domestic players including former ICL players who were made eligible to take part in the tournament. Former ICL players signed up by the franchise were Ambati Rayudu, Ali Murtaza, Abu Nechim, Stuart Binny, Rajagopal Sathish, Ishan Malhotra and Syed Sahabuddin. Other domestic signings include Aditya Tare, Rahul Shukla and Chandan Madan.

== Squad ==
Players with international caps before the start of the 2010 IPL season are listed in bold.

No.	Name	Nationality	Birth date	Batting style	Bowling style	Notes
Batsmen
10	**Sachin Tendulkar**	India	24 April 1973 (aged 36)	Right-handed	Right-arm off break	Captain
15	Saurabh Tiwary	India	30 December 1989 (aged 20)	Left-handed	Right-arm off break	
16	Shikhar Dhawan	India	5 December 1985 (aged 24)	Left-handed	Right-arm off break	
21	**Jean-Paul Duminy**	South Africa	14 April 1984 (aged 26)	Left-handed	Right arm off break	Overseas
27	Ajinkya Rahane	India	5 June 1988 (aged 21)	Right-handed	Right-arm medium	
90	Ambati Rayudu	India	23 September 1985 (aged 24)	Right-handed	Right-arm off break	
All-rounders
01	**Sanath Jayasuriya**	Sri Lanka	30 June 1969 (aged 40)	Left-handed	Slow left arm orthodox	Overseas
08	**Ryan McLaren**	South Africa	9 February 1983 (aged 27)	Left-handed	Right-arm medium-fast	Overseas
17	Graham Napier	England	6 January 1980 (aged 30)	Right-handed	Right-arm medium	Overseas
23	Rajagopal Sathish	India	14 January 1981 (aged 29)	Right-handed	Right-arm medium	
25	**Abhishek Nayar**	India	8 October 1983 (aged 26)	Left-handed	Right-arm medium	
47	**Dwayne Bravo**	Trinidad and Tobago	7 October 1983 (aged 26)	Right-handed	Right-arm medium-fast	Overseas
55	**Kieron Pollard**	Trinidad and Tobago	12 May 1987 (aged 22)	Right-handed	Right-arm medium	Overseas
84	Stuart Binny	India	3 June 1984 (aged 25)	Right-handed	Right-arm medium	
Wicket-keepers
07	Aditya Tare	India	7 November 1987 (aged 22)	Right-handed	–	
12	Chandan Madan	India	15 October 1982 (aged 27)	Right-handed	–	
Bowlers
03	**Harbhajan Singh**	India	3 July 1980 (aged 29)	Right-handed	Right-arm off break	Vice Captain
14	Abu Nechim	India	5 November 1988 (aged 21)	Right-handed	Right-arm medium-fast	
26	**Dilhara Fernando**	Sri Lanka	19 July 1979 (aged 30)	Right-handed	Right arm medium-fast	Overseas
30	Dhawal Kulkarni	India	10 December 1988 (aged 21)	Right-handed	Right-arm medium-fast	
34	**Zaheer Khan**	India	7 October 1978 (aged 31)	Right-handed	Left-arm fast-medium	
39	Ali Murtaza	India	1 January 1990 (aged 20)	Left-handed	Slow left arm orthodox	
99	**Lasith Malinga**	Sri Lanka	28 August 1983 (aged 26)	Right-handed	Right-arm fast	Overseas
	Ishan Malhotra	India	22 May 1984 (aged 25)	Right-handed	Right-arm medium-fast	
	Syed Shahabuddin	India	1 July 1979 (aged 30)	Right-handed	Right-arm medium-fast	
	Rahul Shukla	India	28 August 1990 (aged 19)	Right-handed	Right-arm medium	

== Indian Premier League ==
=== Season standings ===
Pos	Team	Pld	W	L	NR	Pts	NRR
1	Mumbai Indians (R)	14	10	4	0	20	1.084
2	Deccan Chargers(4th)	14	8	6	0	16	−0.297
3	Chennai Super Kings (C)	14	7	7	0	14	0.274
4	Royal Challengers Bangalore (3rd)	14	7	7	0	14	0.219
5	Delhi Daredevils	14	7	7	0	14	0.021
6	Kolkata Knight Riders	14	7	7	0	14	−0.341
7	Rajasthan Royals	14	6	8	0	12	−0.514
8	Kings XI Punjab	14	4	10	0	8	−0.478

(C) = Champion; (R) = Runner-up; (3rd) = Winner of third place playoff.
Note: Top four teams will qualify for the playoffs.
Note: The winner, runner-up and winner of the third place playoff qualified for the 2010 Champions League Twenty20.

=== Match log ===
No.	Date	Opponent	Venue	Result	Scorecard
1	March 13, 2010	Rajasthan Royals	Mumbai	Won by 4 runs	
2	March 17, 2010	Delhi Daredevils	Delhi	Won by 98 runs; MoM – Sachin Tendulkar 63 (32)	
3	March 20, 2010	Royal Challengers Bangalore	Mumbai	Lost by 4 wickets	
4	March 22, 2010	Kolkata Knight Riders	Mumbai	Won by 7 wickets; MoM – Sachin Tendulkar 71* (48)	
5	March 25, 2010	Chennai Super Kings	Mumbai	Won by 5 wickets; MoM – Sachin Tendulkar 72 (52)	
6	March 28, 2010	Deccan Chargers	Mumbai	Won by 41 runs; MoM – Harbhajan Singh 49* (18) and 3/31	
7	March 30, 2010	Kings XI Punjab	Mumbai	Won by 4 wickets; MoM – Lasith Malinga 4/22	
8	April 3, 2010	Deccan Chargers	Mumbai	Won by 63 runs; MoM – Ambati Rayudu 55 (29)	
9	April 6, 2010	Chennai Super Kings	Chennai	Lost by 24 runs	
10	April 9, 2010	Kings XI Punjab	Mohali	Lost by 6 wickets	
11	April 11, 2010	Rajasthan Royals	Jaipur	Won by 37 runs; MoM – Sachin Tendulkar 89* (59)	
12	April 13, 2010	Delhi Daredevils	Mumbai	Won by 39 runs; MoM – Kieron Pollard 45* (13) and 2 runouts	
13	April 17, 2010	Royal Challengers Bangalore	Bangalore	Won by 57 runs; MoM – Ryan McLaren 40 (42) and 1/21	
14	April 19, 2010	Kolkata Knight Riders	Kolkata	Lost by 9 wickets	
15	21 April 2010 — Semifinal	Royal Challengers Bangalore	Mumbai	Won by 35 runs; MoM – Kieron Pollard 33* (13) and 3/17	
16	25 April 2010 — Final	Chennai Super Kings	Mumbai	Lost by 22 runs	
Overall record: 11–5. Runners-up

=== Most runs ===
Player	Innings	Runs	Average	Strike rate	Highest Score	100s	50s
Sachin Tendulkar	15	618	47.53	132.61	89*	0	5
Saurabh Tiwary	15	419	29.92	135.59	61	0	3
Ambati Rayudu	14	356	27.38	144.71	55*	0	2
Kieron Pollard	14	273	22.75	185.71	45*	0	0
Shikhar Dhawan	10	191	19.10	112.35	56	0	2

=== Most wickets ===
Player	Innings	Wickets	Average	Economy rate	Best Bowling	4w
Harbhajan Singh	14	17	22.17	7.04	3/31	0
Kieron Pollard	12	15	18.26	7.40	3/17	0
Lasith Malinga	13	15	22.93	7.02	4/22	1
Zaheer Khan	14	15	25.06	7.77	3/21	0
Dilhara Fernando	5	7	19.71	7.26	2/23	0

== Champions League Twenty20 ==
=== Group standings ===
Team	Pld	W	L	NR	Pts	NRR
Southern Redbacks	4	4	0	0	8	+0.590
Royal Challengers Bangalore	4	2	2	0	4	+0.759
Lions	4	2	2	0	4	+0.401
Mumbai Indians	4	2	2	0	4	+0.221
Guyana	4	0	4	0	0	−2.083

=== Match log ===
No.	Date	Opponent	Venue	Result	Scorecard
1	September 10	Lions	Johannesburg	Lost by 9 runs	
2	September 14	Southern Redbacks	Durban	Lost by 5 wickets	
3	September 16	Guyana	Durban	Won by 31 runs; MoM - Kieron Pollard 72* (30)	
4	September 19	Royal Challengers Bangalore	Durban	Won by 2 runs; MoM - Dwayne Bravo 29 (17) and 2/23	
Overall record: 2–2. Failed to qualify for the semifinals.

=== Most runs ===
Player	Innings	Runs	Average	Strike rate	Highest Score	100s	50s
Sachin Tendulkar	4	148	37.00	139.62	69	0	1
Kieron Pollard	4	127	42.33	201.58	72*	0	1
Shikhar Dhawan	4	114	28.50	102.70	41	0	0

=== Most wickets ===
Player	Innings	Wickets	Average	Economy rate	Best Bowling	4w
Lasith Malinga	4	6	19.66	7.37	3/33	0
Dwayne Bravo	3	4	21.75	7.90	2/18	0
Ali Murtaza	3	3	26.66	8.00	2/29	0

== See also ==
- Chennai Super Kings in 2010
