= 2010 Chennai Super Kings season =

Chennai Super Kings
2010 season
- Coach: Stephen Fleming
- Captain: Mahendra Singh Dhoni
- IPL: Champions
- CLT20: Champions
- Most runs: Suresh Raina (520)
- Most wickets: Muttiah Muralitharan (15)
- Most catches: Murali Vijay (11)
- Most wicket-keeping dismissals: MS Dhoni (11)

Chennai Super Kings were one of the eight teams that took part in the 2010 Indian Premier League. They were captained by Indian skipper Mahendra Singh Dhoni for the third year in succession. They won the tournament after beating Mumbai Indians by 22 runs in the finals. With this, they qualified for the 2010 Champions League Twenty20, which they won by beating the Warriors in the finals.

== Background ==
Chennai Super Kings had finished as semifinalists in the 2009 edition of the IPL held in South Africa. They had failed to qualify for the inaugural CLT20 as the other losing semifinalists, Delhi Daredevils, progressed to the event having a better record than CSK in the group stages.

== Pre-season player signings ==
The Super Kings added Justin Kemp and Thisara Perera to their roster, the former filling an empty slot while the latter serving as a substitute to Andrew Flintoff, who had planned to skip that season. They also signed former ICL cricketer Hemang Badani and local all-rounder Chandrasekar Ganapathy. Australian pacer Doug Bollinger was drafted as the replacement player for all-rounder Jacob Oram who was injured before the start of the tournament.

== Squad ==
Players with international caps before the start of the 2010 IPL season are listed in bold.

No.	Name	Nationality	Birth date	Batting style	Bowling style	Notes
Batsmen
01	**Murali Vijay**	India	1 April 1984 (aged 25)	Right-handed	Right-arm off break	
03	**Suresh Raina**	India	27 November 1986 (aged 23)	Left-handed	Right-arm off break	Vice-captain
09	Arun Karthik	India	15 February 1986 (aged 24)	Right-handed	Right-arm leg break	
10	George Bailey	Australia	7 September 1982 (aged 27)	Right-handed	Right arm medium	Overseas
28	**Matthew Hayden**	Australia	29 October 1971 (aged 38)	Left-handed	Right-arm medium	Overseas
33	**Subramaniam Badrinath**	India	30 August 1980 (aged 29)	Right-handed	Right-arm off break	
48	**Michael Hussey**	Australia	27 May 1975 (aged 34)	Left-handed	Right-arm medium	Overseas
77	Anirudha Srikkanth	India	14 April 1987 (aged 22)	Right-handed	Right-arm off break	
90	Abhinav Mukund	India	6 January 1990 (aged 20)	Left-handed	Right-arm leg break	
All-rounders
	**Jacob Oram**	New Zealand	28 July 1978 (aged 30)	Left-handed	Right-arm medium-fast	Overseas. Player withdrew from the tournament.
81	**Albie Morkel**	South Africa	10 June 1981 (aged 28)	Left-handed	Right arm medium-fast	Overseas
	**Thisara Perera**	Sri Lanka	3 April 1989 (aged 20)	Left-handed	Right-arm medium-fast	Overseas
	**Justin Kemp**	South Africa	2 October 1977 (aged 32)	Right-handed	Right-arm medium	Overseas
	**Hemang Badani**	India	14 November 1976 (aged 33)	Left-handed	Slow left arm orthodox	
	Chandrasekar Ganapathy	India	10 June 1981 (aged 28)	Right-handed	Right-arm medium	
Wicket-keepers
07	**Mahendra Singh Dhoni**	India	7 July 1981 (aged 28)	Right-handed	Right-arm medium	Captain
42	**Parthiv Patel**	India	9 March 1985 (aged 25)	Left-handed	–	
Bowlers
14	Ravichandran Ashwin	India	17 September 1986 (aged 23)	Right-handed	Right-arm off break	
16	**Makhaya Ntini**	South Africa	6 July 1977 (aged 32)	Right-handed	Right arm fast-medium	Overseas
17	**Sudeep Tyagi**	India	19 September 1987 (aged 22)	Right-handed	Right-arm medium-fast	
23	**Joginder Sharma**	India	23 October 1983 (aged 26)	Right-handed	Right-arm fast-medium	
24	**Doug Bollinger**	Australia	24 July 1981 (aged 28)	Left-handed	Left-arm fast-medium	Overseas
27	Shadab Jakati	India	27 November 1980 (aged 29)	Left-handed	Slow left arm orthodox	
55	**Lakshmipathy Balaji**	India	27 August 1981 (aged 28)	Right-handed	Right-arm fast-medium	
76	**Manpreet Gony**	India	4 January 1984 (aged 26)	Right-handed	Right-arm medium-fast	
97	**Thilan Thushara**	Sri Lanka	1 March 1981 (aged 29)	Left-handed	Left-arm medium-fast	Overseas
800	**Muttiah Muralitharan**	Sri Lanka	17 April 1971 (aged 38)	Right-handed	Right-arm off break	Overseas

== Indian Premier League ==
The Chennai Super Kings began the 2010 season with a 31-run defeat against the defending champions Deccan Chargers. In their second match, they beat the Kolkata Knight Riders by 55 runs, as captain MS Dhoni scored an unbeaten 66 off 33 balls. During the match Dhoni picked up an injury after he was hit on the arm by a rising delivery from Shane Bond. The injury forced Dhoni to sit out of the tournament for a week during which Suresh Raina took over the captaincy of the team. Then they also managed to beat Delhi Daredevils comfortably by 5 wickets as Matthew Hayden struck 93 off 43 deliveries. Their fourth match of the season, against Kings XI Punjab, went to the Super Over after the match ended in a tie. In the Super Over, CSK set Punjab a target of 10, which the latter chased down comfortably with two balls to spare. They lost to the Royal Challengers in the next match after RCB batsman Robin Uthappa scored an unbeaten 68 to help his team put up a big total on the board. At Mumbai, Suresh Raina scored an unbeaten 83 to take his team to 180/2 in 20 overs. But, the home team Mumbai Indians chased down this total, thanks to their openers Sachin Tendulkar and Shikhar Dhawan, both of whom struck fifties. This game also marked the return of their skipper Dhoni who missed the three previous games due to injury. They lost their fourth game on trot after they went down to Rajasthan Royals by 17 runs at Ahmedabad. The losing streak came to an end after Murali Vijay made a 39-ball 78 against the Royal Challengers to help his team chase down the target of 162. Vijay continued his good form in the next game against Rajasthan Royals, scoring 127 (56 balls) including eight fours and 11 sixes. He combined with Albie Morkel (62 off 34 balls) to set up the biggest total in the history of IPL (246/5). Chennai managed to win the game by 23 runs despite Rajasthan batsmen Naman Ojha's 94* and Shane Watson's quickfire 60. The match also witnessed the IPL debut of pacer Doug Bollinger, who became a vital cog in their bowling attack. He impressed with figures of 2/15 (4 overs) in the high-scoring match. They could beat the consistent Mumbai Indians at Chepauk with an all-round performance by Suresh Raina. Raina impressed again in the next game against Deccan Chargers by scoring 52, but this knock could not save CSK from a 6-wicket defeat. In another home game, the Super Kings beat the Kolkata Knight Riders by 9 wickets with 39 balls to spare. Spinner Ravichandran Ashwin, who had a good season with the ball, delivered once again with figures of 4-0-16-3. His effort was ably supported by the CSK batsmen Vijay (50* from 40) and Raina (78* from 39). However, they lost to Delhi Daredevils by 6 wickets after poor showing by the batsmen. Delhi skipper Gautam Gambhir won the Man of the Match for his unbeaten 57. Their last league match, a do-or-die for Chennai, was at the picturesque Dharamsala against Kings XI Punjab. The match is remembered for CSK skipper Dhoni's innings of 54* (29) that turned the match on its head to give Chennai an improbable win. He was well supported by Raina's 46 (27) and Subramaniam Badrinath, who scored 53 (36) to set up the chase of 192. They ended their league fixtures with 14 points from as many matches, finishing with the same number of points as three other teams with two semi-final spots at stake. Chennai got the third place as they had the best Net run rate of the four teams which finished on 14 points.

In the semi-final at Navi Mumbai, the Super Kings bowled out the Deccan Chargers for 102 after setting them a target of 143, winning the game by 38 runs to book their place in the finals. Bollinger won the Man of the Match for his bowling effort of 4-1-13-4. The win also assured them a place in the 2010 Champions League Twenty20. At the IPL final, the Chennai Super Kings took on the tournament favorites Mumbai Indians. Chennai, electing to bat first after winning the toss, were struggling at one stage with the score of 68/3 after 12 overs. But then, Raina produced, what turned out to be a match-winning innings, 57* (35), as his team put up 168/5 in 20 overs. Mumbai Indians kept losing wickets in their run-chase and eventually lost the match by 22 runs. Chennai Super Kings were crowned champions of the tournament for the first time. Raina won the Man of the Match award in the final while Mumbai skipper Sachin Tendulkar was named Player of the Tournament.

=== Season standings ===
Pos	Team	Pld	W	L	NR	Pts	NRR
1	Mumbai Indians (R)	14	10	4	0	20	1.084
2	Deccan Chargers(4th)	14	8	6	0	16	−0.297
3	Chennai Super Kings (C)	14	7	7	0	14	0.274
4	Royal Challengers Bangalore (3rd)	14	7	7	0	14	0.219
5	Delhi Daredevils	14	7	7	0	14	0.021
6	Kolkata Knight Riders	14	7	7	0	14	−0.341
7	Rajasthan Royals	14	6	8	0	12	−0.514
8	Kings XI Punjab	14	4	10	0	8	−0.478

(C) = Champion; (R) = Runner-up; (3rd) = Winner of third place playoff.
Note: Top four teams will qualify for the playoffs.
Note: The winner, runner-up and winner of the third place playoff qualified for the 2010 Champions League Twenty20.

=== Match log ===
No	Date	Opponent	Venue	Result	Scorecard
1	14 March	Deccan Chargers	Chennai	Lost by 31 runs	Scorecard
2	16 March	Kolkata Knight Riders	Kolkata	Won by 55 runs, MoM – Mahendra Singh Dhoni 66* (33)	Scorecard
3	19 March	Delhi Daredevils	Delhi	Won by 5 wickets, MoM – Matthew Hayden 93 (43)	Scorecard
4	21 March	Kings XI Punjab	Chennai	Match tied, Lost the Super Over	Scorecard
5	23 March	Royal Challengers Bangalore	Bangalore	Lost by 36 runs	Scorecard
6	25 March	Mumbai Indians	Mumbai	Lost by 5 wickets	Scorecard
7	28 March	Rajasthan Royals	Ahmedabad	Lost by 17 runs	Scorecard
8	31 March	Royal Challengers Bangalore	Chennai	Won by 5 wickets, MoM – Murali Vijay 78 (39)	Scorecard
9	3 April	Rajasthan Royals	Chennai	Won by 23 runs, MoM – Murali Vijay 127 (56)	Scorecard
10	6 April	Mumbai Indians	Chennai	Won by 24 runs, MoM – Suresh Raina 23 (18) and 1/12 (2.3 overs)	Scorecard
11	10 April	Deccan Chargers	Nagpur	Lost by 6 wickets	Scorecard
12	13 April	Kolkata Knight Riders	Chennai	Won by 9 wickets, MoM – Ravichandran Ashwin 3/16 (4 overs)	Scorecard
13	15 April	Delhi Daredevils	Chennai	Lost by 6 wickets	Scorecard
14	18 April	Kings XI Punjab	Dharamsala	Won by 6 wickets, MoM – Mahendra Singh Dhoni 54* (29)	Scorecard
15	22 April	Deccan Chargers (semi-final)	Navi Mumbai	Won by 38 runs, MoM – Doug Bollinger 4/13 (4 overs)	Scorecard
16	25 April	Mumbai Indians (final)	Navi Mumbai	Won by 22 runs, MoM – Suresh Raina 57 (35), 1/21	Scorecard
Overall record: 9–7. Champions. Qualified for 2010 Champions League Twenty20.

=== Most runs ===
Player	Innings	Runs	Average	Strike rate	Highest Score	100s	50s
Suresh Raina	16	520	47.27	142.85	83*	0	4
Murali Vijay	15	458	35.23	156.84	127	1	2
Subramaniam Badrinath	15	356	32.26	117.49	55*	0	2
Matthew Hayden	16	346	21.62	124.01	93	0	1
MS Dhoni	11	287	31.88	136.66	66*	0	2

=== Most wickets ===
Player	Innings	Wickets	Average	Economy rate	Best Bowling	4w
Muttiah Muralitharan	12	15	21.93	6.85	3/16	0
Shadab Jakati	11	13	22.38	7.65	2/17	0
Ravichandran Ashwin	12	13	22.53	6.10	3/16	0
Doug Bollinger	8	12	17.25	6.67	4/13	1
Albie Morkel	14	11	36.81	8.49	2/23	0

== Champions League T20 ==
They topped Group A with 6 points (3 wins and 1 loss) to qualify for the semi-finals where they had to face Royal Challengers Bangalore at Kingsmead, Durban. After a comprehensive victory of 52 runs by (D/L) method against the Challengers, they played their first CLT20 final at Johannesburg. They beat the Chevrolet Warriors by 8 wickets in the final, becoming the first IPL side to win the CLT20. Murali Vijay won the Golden Bat for scoring the maximum runs in the tournament and Ravichandran Ashwin was the leading wicket-taker and he was awarded the Man of the Series.

=== Season standings ===
Teams	Pld	W	L	NR	PTS	NRR
Chennai Super Kings	4	3	1	0	6	+2.050
Warriors	4	3	1	0	6	+0.588
Victorian Bushrangers	4	3	1	0	6	+0.366
Wayamba Elevens	4	1	3	0	2	−1.126
Central Districts Stags	4	0	4	0	0	−1.844

=== Match log ===
Date	Opponent	Venue	Result	Scorecard
11 September	Central Stags	Durban	Won by 57 runs, MoM – Subramaniam Badrinath 52* (42)	Scorecard
15 September	Wayamba Elevens	Centurion	Won by 97 runs, MoM – Suresh Raina 87 (44)	Scorecard
18 September	Victorian Bushrangers	Port Elizabeth	Lost by Super Over	Scorecard
22 September	Warriors	Port Elizabeth	Won by 10 runs, MoM – Michael Hussey 50 (39)	Scorecard
24 September	Royal Challengers Bangalore (semi-final)	Durban	Won by 52 runs(D/L), MoM – Suresh Raina 94* (48)	Scorecard
26 September	Warriors (final)	Johannesburg	Won by 8 wickets, MoM – Murali Vijay 58 (53)	Scorecard
Overall record: 5– 1. Champions.

=== Most runs ===
Player	Innings	Runs	Average	Strike rate	Highest Score	100s	50s
Murali Vijay	6	294	49.00	122.50	73	0	3
Suresh Raina	6	203	40.60	167.76	94*	0	2
Michael Hussey	4	132	44.00	105.60	51*	0	2

=== Most wickets ===
Player	Innings	Wickets	Average	Economy rate	Best Bowling	4w
Ravichandran Ashwin	6	13	11.69	6.51	4/18	1
Muttiah Muralitharan	6	12	11.00	5.69	3/16	0
Doug Bollinger	6	9	17.33	7.03	3/27	0
