= 2010 Kings XI Punjab season =

Indian Premier League cricket team season

Kings XI Punjab
2010 season
- Coach: Tom Moody
- Captain: Mahela Jayawardene
- Ground(s): PCA Stadium, Mohali
- IPL: 8th
- Most runs: Mahela Jayawardene (472)
- Most wickets: Irfan Pathan (15)

Kings XI Punjab (KXIP) is a franchise cricket team based in Mohali, India, which plays in the Indian Premier League (IPL). They were one of the eight teams that competed in the 2010 Indian Premier League. They were captained by Mahela Jayawardene. Kings XI Punjab finished last in the IPL and did not qualify for the Champions League T20.

== Indian Premier League ==
=== Season standings ===
Kings XI Punjab finished last in the league stage of IPL 2010.

Pos	Team	Pld	W	L	NR	Pts	NRR
1	Mumbai Indians (R)	14	10	4	0	20	1.084
2	Deccan Chargers(4th)	14	8	6	0	16	−0.297
3	Chennai Super Kings (C)	14	7	7	0	14	0.274
4	Royal Challengers Bangalore (3rd)	14	7	7	0	14	0.219
5	Delhi Daredevils	14	7	7	0	14	0.021
6	Kolkata Knight Riders	14	7	7	0	14	−0.341
7	Rajasthan Royals	14	6	8	0	12	−0.514
8	Kings XI Punjab	14	4	10	0	8	−0.478

(C) = Champion; (R) = Runner-up; (3rd) = Winner of third place playoff.
Note: Top four teams will qualify for the playoffs.
Note: The winner, runner-up and winner of the third place playoff qualified for the 2010 Champions League Twenty20.

=== Match log ===
No.	Date	Opponent	Venue	Result
1	13 March	Delhi Daredevils	Mohali	Lost by 5 wickets
2	16 March	Royal Challengers Bangalore	Bengaluru	Lost by 8 wickets
3	19 March	Deccan Chargers	Cuttack	Lost by 6 runs
4	21 March	Chennai Super Kings	Chennai	Match tied, Won (In The Superover), MoM - Juan Theron 2/17(4 overs),2 wkts in the Super-Over
5	24 March	Rajasthan Royals	Mohali	Lost by 31 runs
6	27 March	Kolkata Knight Riders	Mohali	Lost by 39 runs
7	30 March	Mumbai Indians	Mumbai	Lost by 4 wickets
8	2 April	Royal Challengers Bangalore	Mohali	Lost by 6 wickets
9	4 April	Kolkata Knight Riders	Kolkata	Won by 8 wickets, MoM - Mahela Jayawardene 110* (59)
10	7 April	Rajasthan Royals	Jaipur	Lost by 9 wickets
11	9 April	Mumbai Indians	Mohali	Won by 6 wickets, MoM - Kumar Sangakkara 56 (42)
12	11 April	Delhi Daredevils	Delhi	Won by 7 wickets, MoM - Piyush Chawla 2/16(4)
13	16 April	Deccan Chargers	Dharamsala	Lost by 5 wickets
14	18 April	Chennai Super Kings	Dharamsala	Lost by 6 wickets
Overall record: 4–10. Failed to advance.
