= 2010 Royal Challengers Bangalore season =

Indian Premier League cricket team season

Royal Challengers Bangalore
2010 season
- Coach: Ray Jennings
- Captain: Anil Kumble
- Ground(s): M. Chinnaswamy Stadium, Bangalore
- IPL: Playoffs
- CLT20: Semi-finals
- Most runs: Jacques Kallis (572)
- Most wickets: Anil Kumble (17)

Royal Challengers Bangalore is a franchise cricket team based in Bangalore, India, which plays in the Indian Premier League (IPL). They were one of the eight teams that competed in the 2010 Indian Premier League. They were captained by Anil Kumble. Royal Challengers Bangalore finished third in the IPL and qualified for the Champions League T20.

== Squad ==
Name	Nationality	Birth date	Batting Style	Bowling Style	Notes
Batsmen
Virat Kohli	India	5 November 1988 (aged 21)	Right-handed	Right-arm medium	Vice-captain
Rahul Dravid	India	11 January 1973 (aged 37)	Right-handed	Right-arm off break	
Manish Pandey	India	10 September 1989 (aged 20)	Right-handed	Right-arm medium	
Kevin Pietersen	England	27 June 1980 (aged 29)	Right-handed	Right-arm off break	Overseas
Ross Taylor	New Zealand	8 March 1984 (aged 26)	Right-handed	Right-arm off break	Overseas
Cameron White	Australia	18 August 1983 (aged 26)	Right-handed	Right-arm leg break	Overseas
Eoin Morgan	England	10 September 1986 (aged 23)	Left-handed	Right-arm medium	Overseas
Sridharan Sriram	India	21 February 1976 (aged 34)	Left-handed	Left-arm orthodox spin	
Steve Smith	Australia	2 June 1989 (aged 20)	Right-handed	Right-arm leg break	Overseas
All-rounders
Jacques Kallis	South Africa	16 October 1975 (aged 34)	Right-handed	Right-arm medium-fast	Overseas
KP Appanna	India	20 December 1988 (aged 21)	Right-handed	Left-arm orthodox spin	
Roelof van der Merwe	Netherlands	31 December 1984 (aged 25)	Right-handed	Left-arm orthodox spin	
Dillon du Preez	South Africa	8 November 1981 (aged 28)	Right-handed	Right-arm medium	Overseas
Wicket-keepers
Robin Uthappa	India	11 November 1985 (aged 24)	Right-handed	–	
Mark Boucher	South Africa	3 December 1976 (aged 33)	Right-handed	–	Overseas
Shreevats Goswami	India	18 May 1989 (aged 20)	Left-handed	–	
Bowlers
Anil Kumble	India	17 October 1970 (aged 39)	Right-handed	Right-arm leg break	Captain
Dale Steyn	South Africa	27 June 1987 (aged 22)	Right-handed	Right-arm medium-fast	Overseas
Vinay Kumar	India	12 February 1984 (aged 26)	Right-handed	Right arm medium-fast	
Praveen Kumar	India	2 October 1986 (aged 23)	Right-handed	Right arm medium-fast	
Abhimanyu Mithun	India	25 October 1989 (aged 20)	Right-handed	Right arm medium-fast	
Balachandra Akhil	India	7 October 1977 (aged 32)	Right-handed	Right arm medium-fast	
Bhuvneshwar Kumar	India	5 February 1990 (aged 20)	Right-handed	Right arm medium-fast	

== Indian Premier League season ==
=== Standings ===
Royal Challengers Bangalore finished fourth in the league stage of IPL 2010.

Pos	Team	Pld	W	L	NR	Pts	NRR
1	Mumbai Indians (R)	14	10	4	0	20	1.084
2	Deccan Chargers(4th)	14	8	6	0	16	−0.297
3	Chennai Super Kings (C)	14	7	7	0	14	0.274
4	Royal Challengers Bangalore (3rd)	14	7	7	0	14	0.219
5	Delhi Daredevils	14	7	7	0	14	0.021
6	Kolkata Knight Riders	14	7	7	0	14	−0.341
7	Rajasthan Royals	14	6	8	0	12	−0.514
8	Kings XI Punjab	14	4	10	0	8	−0.478

(C) = Champion; (R) = Runner-up; (3rd) = Winner of third place playoff.
Note: Top four teams will qualify for the playoffs.
Note: The winner, runner-up and winner of the third place playoff qualified for the 2010 Champions League Twenty20.

=== Match log ===
No.	Date	Opponent	Venue	Result	Scorecard
1	14 March	Kolkata Knight Riders	Kolkata	Lost by 7 wickets	Scorecard
2	16 March	Kings XI Punjab	Bengaluru	Won by 8 wickets, MoM – Jacques Kallis 89* (55) and 1/39 (4 overs)	Scorecard
3	18 March	Rajasthan Royals	Bengaluru	Won by 10 wickets, MoM – Jacques Kallis 44* (34) and 2/20 (4 overs)	Scorecard
4	20 March	Mumbai Indians	Mumbai	Won by 7 wickets, MoM – Jacques Kallis 66* (55) and 1/35 (4 overs)	Scorecard
5	23 March	Chennai Super Kings	Bengaluru	Won by 36 runs, MoM – Robin Uthappa 68* (38)	Scorecard
6	25 March	Delhi Daredevils	Bengaluru	Lost by 17 runs	Scorecard
7	31 March	Chennai Super Kings	Chennai	Lost by 5 wickets	Scorecard
8	2 April	Kings XI Punjab	Mohali	Won by 6 wickets, MoM – Kevin Pietersen 66* (44) and 0/8 (1 over)	Scorecard
9	4 April	Delhi Daredevils	Delhi	Lost by 37 runs	Scorecard
10	8 April	Deccan Chargers	Bengaluru	Lost by 7 wickets	Scorecard
11	10 April	Kolkata Knight Riders	Bengaluru	Won by 7 wickets, MoM – Vinay Kumar 3/23 (3 overs)	Scorecard
12	12 April	Deccan Chargers	Nagpur	Lost by 13 runs	Scorecard
13	14 April	Rajasthan Royals	Jaipur	Won by 5 wickets, MoM – Kevin Pietersen 62 (29)	Scorecard
14	17 April	Mumbai Indians	Bengaluru	Lost by 57 runs	Scorecard
Semifinal	21 April	Mumbai Indians	Navi Mumbai	Lost by 35 runs	Scorecard
3/4 Playoff	24 April	Deccan Chargers	Navi Mumbai	Won by 9 wickets, MoM – Anil Kumble 4/16 (4 overs)	Scorecard
Overall record: 8–8. Semin-finalists. Qualified for 2010 Champions Trophy Twenty20.

== Champions League Twenty20 ==
=== Match log ===
No.	Date	Opponent	Venue	Result	Scorecard
1	12 September 2010	Guyana	Centurion	Won by 9 wickets MoM - (South Africa) Jacques Kallis 43* (32) and 3/16 (4 overs)	Scorecard
2	17 September 2010	Southern Redbacks	Durban	Lost by 8 wickets	Scorecard
3	19 September 2010	Mumbai Indians	Durban	Lost by 2 runs	Scorecard
4	21 September 2010	Lions	Johannesburg	Won by 6 wickets, MoM – (India) Virat Kohli 49* (29)	Scorecard
Semi-Final	24 September 2010	Chennai Super Kings	Durban	Lost by 52 runs (D/L)	Scorecard
Overall record of 2–3. Semi-finalists.
