= 2010 Rajasthan Royals season =

Cricket team based in Jaipur, India

Rajasthan Royals
2010 season
- Coach: Shane Warne
- Captain: Shane Warne
- Ground(s): Sawai Mansingh Stadium, Jaipur
- IPL: 7th
- Most runs: Naman Ojha (377)
- Most wickets: Siddarth Trivedi (11)

Rajasthan Royals (RR) is a franchise cricket team based in Jaipur, India, which plays in the Indian Premier League (IPL). They were one of the eight teams that competed in the 2010 Indian Premier League. They were captained by Shane Warne. Rajasthan Royals finished 7th in the IPL and did not qualify for the champions league T20.

== IPL ==
=== Standings ===
Rajasthan Royals finished 7th in the league stage of IPL 2010.

| Pos | Team | Pld | W | L | NR | Pts | NRR |
|---|---|---|---|---|---|---|---|
| 1 | Mumbai Indians (R) | 14 | 10 | 4 | 0 | 20 | 1.084 |
| 2 | Deccan Chargers(4th) | 14 | 8 | 6 | 0 | 16 | −0.297 |
| 3 | Chennai Super Kings (C) | 14 | 7 | 7 | 0 | 14 | 0.274 |
| 4 | Royal Challengers Bangalore (3rd) | 14 | 7 | 7 | 0 | 14 | 0.219 |
| 5 | Delhi Daredevils | 14 | 7 | 7 | 0 | 14 | 0.021 |
| 6 | Kolkata Knight Riders | 14 | 7 | 7 | 0 | 14 | −0.341 |
| 7 | Rajasthan Royals | 14 | 6 | 8 | 0 | 12 | −0.514 |
| 8 | Kings XI Punjab | 14 | 4 | 10 | 0 | 8 | −0.478 |

(C) = Champion; (R) = Runner-up; (3rd) = Winner of third place playoff.
Note: Top four teams will qualify for the playoffs.
Note: The winner, runner-up and winner of the third place playoff qualified for the 2010 Champions League Twenty20.

=== Match log ===
| No. | Date | Opponent | Venue | Result | Man of the match | Scorecard |
|---|---|---|---|---|---|---|
| 1 | 13 March 2010 | Mumbai Indians | Mumbai | Lost by 4 runs | Yusuf Pathan 100(37) | Scorecard |
| 2 | 15 March 2010 | Delhi Daredevils | Ahmedabad | Lost by 6 wickets | | Scorecard |
| 3 | 18 March 2010 | Royal Challengers Bangalore | Bangalore | Lost by 10 wickets | | Scorecard |
| 4 | 20 March 2010 | Kolkata Knight Riders | Ahmedabad | Won by 34 runs | Abhishek Jhunjhunwala 45(36) | Scorecard |
| 5 | 24 March 2010 | Kings XI Punjab | Mohali | Won by 31 runs | Adam Voges 45(24) | Scorecard |
| 6 | 26 March 2010 | Deccan Chargers | Ahmedabad | Won by 8 wickets | Yusuf Pathan 73(34) | Scorecard |
| 7 | 28 March 2010 | Chennai Super Kings | Ahmedabad | Won by 17 runs | Naman Ojha 80(49) | Scorecard |
| 8 | 31 March 2010 | Delhi Daredevils | New Delhi | Lost by 67 runs | | Scorecard |
| 9 | 3 April 2010 | Chennai Super Kings | Chennai | Lost by 23 runs | | Scorecard |
| 10 | 5 April 2010 | Deccan Chargers | Nagpur | Won by 2 runs | Shane Warne 4/21(4 overs) | Scorecard |
| 11 | 7 April 2010 | Kings XI Punjab | Jaipur | Won by 9 wickets | Michael Lumb 83(43) | Scorecard |
| 12 | 11 April 2010 | Mumbai Indians | Jaipur | Lost by 37 runs | | Scorecard |
| 13 | 14 April 2010 | Royal Challengers Bangalore | Jaipur | Lost by 5 wickets | | Scorecard |
| 14 | 17 April 2010 | Kolkata Knight Riders | Kolkata | Lost by 8 wickets | | Scorecard |
