= 2010 Kolkata Knight Riders season =

Indian Premier League cricket team season

Kolkata Knight Riders
2010 season
- Coach: Dav Whatmore
- Captain: Sourav Ganguly
- Ground(s): Eden Gardens, Kolkata
- IPL: 6th
- Most runs: Sourav Ganguly (493)
- Most wickets: Ashok Dinda (9)

Kolkata Knight Riders (KKR) is a franchise cricket team based in Kolkata, India, which plays in the Indian Premier League (IPL). They were one of the eight teams that competed in the 2010 IPL. They were captained by Sourav Ganguly. Kolkata Knight Riders finished 6th in the IPL and did not qualify for the Champions League T20.

== Background ==
The Kolkata Knight Riders traded Australian all-rounder Moises Henriques for Manoj Tiwary and Owais Shah. At the player auctions they managed to successfully buy Shane Bond in the silent tie-breaker against competing bids from Deccan Chargers for $1.3 million. Ganguly was once again given the captaincy of KKR, after the team ended at the bottom in the second season. The coach John Buchanan was replaced by Dav Whatmore.

The Kolkata Knight Riders had a fantastic start to the season with two consecutive wins against Deccan Chargers and Royal Challengers Bangalore. That was followed by three defeats at the hands of Chennai Super Kings, Rajasthan Royals and Mumbai Indians. The Knight Riders then made a comeback by winning most of their homes games against Kings XI Punjab, Deccan Chargers and Delhi Daredevils. Despite being tied at 14 points with The Super Kings, Delhi Daredevils and Royal Challengers Bangalore, a lesser net run rate (NRR) meant they eventually finished sixth on the point table.

== Indian Premier League ==
=== Season standings ===
Kolkata Knight Riders finished 6th in the league stage of IPL 2010.

Pos	Team	Pld	W	L	NR	Pts	NRR
1	Mumbai Indians (R)	14	10	4	0	20	1.084
2	Deccan Chargers(4th)	14	8	6	0	16	−0.297
3	Chennai Super Kings (C)	14	7	7	0	14	0.274
4	Royal Challengers Bangalore (3rd)	14	7	7	0	14	0.219
5	Delhi Daredevils	14	7	7	0	14	0.021
6	Kolkata Knight Riders	14	7	7	0	14	−0.341
7	Rajasthan Royals	14	6	8	0	12	−0.514
8	Kings XI Punjab	14	4	10	0	8	−0.478

(C) = Champion; (R) = Runner-up; (3rd) = Winner of third place playoff.
Note: Top four teams will qualify for the playoffs.
Note: The winner, runner-up and winner of the third place playoff qualified for the 2010 Champions League Twenty20.

=== Match log ===
Date	Opponent	Venue	Result
12 March	Deccan Chargers	Navi Mumbai	Won by 11 runs, MoM- Angelo Mathews 65 (46) and 2/20 (4 overs)
14 March	Royal Challengers Bangalore	Kolkata	Won by 7 wickets, MoM- Manoj Tiwary 50 (29)
16 March	Chennai Super Kings	Kolkata	Lost by 55 runs
20 March	Rajasthan Royals	Ahmedabad	Lost by 34 runs
22 March	Mumbai Indians	Mumbai	Lost by 7 wickets
27 March	.Kings XI Punjab	Mohali	Won by 39 Runs, MoM- Manoj Tiwary 75 (47)
29 March	.Delhi Daredevils	Delhi	Lost by 40 Runs
1 April	Deccan Chargers	Kolkata	Won by 24 Runs, MoM- Sourav Ganguly 88 (54)
4 April	Kings XI Punjab	Kolkata	Lost by 8 wickets
7 April	Delhi Daredevils	Kolkata	Won by 14 runs, MoM- Sourav Ganguly 56 (46)
10 April	.Royal Challengers Bangalore	Bangalore	Lost by 7 wickets
13 April	Chennai Super Kings	Chennai	Lost by 9 wickets
17 April	Rajasthan Royals	Kolkata	Won by 8 wickets, MoM- Jaydev Unadkat 3/26 (4 overs)
19 April	Mumbai Indians	Kolkata	Won by 9 wickets, MoM- Murali Kartik 2/20 (4 overs) and 2 catches
Overall record: 7–7. Failed to advance.
