= 2010 Delhi Daredevils season =

Indian Premier League cricket team season

Delhi Daredevils
2010 season
- Coach: Greg Shipperd
- Captain: Gautam Gambhir
- Ground(s): Feroz Shah Kotla, Delhi
- IPL: 5th
- Most runs: Virender Sehwag (356)
- Most wickets: Amit Mishra (17)

Delhi Daredevils (DD) is a franchise cricket team based in Delhi, India, which plays in the Indian Premier League (IPL). They were one of the eight teams that competed in the 2010 Indian Premier League. They were captained by Virender Sehwag. Delhi Daredevils finished 5th in the IPL and did not qualify for the Champions League T20.

== Indian Premier League ==
=== Standings ===
Delhi Daredevils finished fifth in the league stage of IPL 2010.

Pos	Team	Pld	W	L	NR	Pts	NRR
1	Mumbai Indians (R)	14	10	4	0	20	1.084
2	Deccan Chargers(4th)	14	8	6	0	16	−0.297
3	Chennai Super Kings (C)	14	7	7	0	14	0.274
4	Royal Challengers Bangalore (3rd)	14	7	7	0	14	0.219
5	Delhi Daredevils	14	7	7	0	14	0.021
6	Kolkata Knight Riders	14	7	7	0	14	−0.341
7	Rajasthan Royals	14	6	8	0	12	−0.514
8	Kings XI Punjab	14	4	10	0	8	−0.478

(C) = Champion; (R) = Runner-up; (3rd) = Winner of third place playoff.
Note: Top four teams will qualify for the playoffs.
Note: The winner, runner-up and winner of the third place playoff qualified for the 2010 Champions League Twenty20.

=== Match log ===
No	Date	Opponent	Venue	Result
1	13 March	Kings XI Punjab	Mohali	Won by 8 wickets, MoM- Gautam Gambhir – 72 (54)
2	15 March	Rajasthan Royals	Ahmedabad	Won by 6 wickets, MoM- Virender Sehwag – 75 (34)
3	17 March	Mumbai Indians	Delhi	Lost by 98 runs
4	19 March	Chennai Super Kings	Delhi	Lost by 5 wickets
5	21 March	Deccan Chargers	Cuttack	Lost by 10 runs
6	25 March	Royal Challengers Bangalore	Bengaluru	Won by 17 runs, MoM- Kedar Jadhav – 50 (29)
7	29 March	Kolkata Knight Riders	Delhi	Won by 40 runs, MoM- David Warner – 107 (69)
8	31 March	Rajasthan Royals	Delhi	Won by 67 runs, MoM- Dinesh Karthik – 69 (38)
9	4 April	Royal Challengers Bangalore	Delhi	Won by 37 runs, MoM- Paul Collingwood – 75
10	7 April	Kolkata Knight Riders	Kolkata	Lost by 19 runs
11	11 April	Kings XI Punjab	Delhi	Lost by 7 wickets
12	13 April	Mumbai Indians	Mumbai	Lost by 39 runs
13	15 April	Chennai Super Kings	Chennai	Won by 6 wickets, MoM- Gautam Gambhir – 57* (56)
14	18 April	Deccan Chargers	Delhi	Lost by 11 runs

== Statistics ==
Most runs
Player	Runs
Virender Sehwag	356
David Warner	282
Dinesh Karthik	278

Most wickets
Player	Wickets
Amit Mishra	17
Pradeep Sangwan	9
Farveez Maharoof	8
