= Champions League 2010 =

Champions League 2010 may refer to:

- 2010 AFC Champions League
- 2010 CAF Champions League
- 2009–10 UEFA Champions League
- 2010–11 UEFA Champions League
- 2009–10 CONCACAF Champions League
- 2010–11 CONCACAF Champions League
- 2010 Champions League Twenty20
