= Davy Jacobs =

South African cricketer

Personal information
- Full name: David Johan Jacobs
- Born: 4 November 1982 (age 44); Klerksdorp, Transvaal
- Batting: Right-handed
- Bowling: Right-arm medium
- Role: Wicket-keeper batsman
- Relatives: Chris Jacobs (brother)

Domestic team information
- Years: Team
- 2001/02–2003/04: North West
- 2004/05–2006/07: Knights
- 2006/07: Free State
- 2007: Northamptonshire
- 2007/08–2013/14: Warriors (squad no. 82)
- 2007/08–2013/14: Eastern Province
- 2011-2012: Mumbai Indians (squad no. 82)
- 2013: Trinidad and Tobago Red Steel (squad no. 82)

Career statistics
Competition	FC	LA	T20
Matches	91	106	83
Runs scored	5,520	2,591	1,707
Batting average	36.80	29.44	25.86
100s/50s	14/28	1/18	0/8
Top score	218	101*	83
Catches/stumpings	144/4	98/8	39/8
- Source: ESPNcricinfo, 11 January 2017

David Johan Jacobs (born 4 November 1982) is a South African cricketer, who played for Warriors and the Eagles cricket team. Since then, he has represented the Canadian cricket team, and in 2018, he captained the team as part of a first-class cricket tournament in the West Indies. He has also played for the Mumbai Indians in the Indian Premier League (IPL).

== Playing career ==
He is a right-handed batsman, he has made over 3000 first class runs at an average above 40 and a highest score of 218. He is also a wicket-keeper, and a natural born leader. He also played for Northamptonshire County Cricket Club as a substitute overseas player while a professional with Carrickfergus CC in Northern Ireland in 2007.

Jacobs led the Warriors to two trophies in 2010/2011. His fantastic performance during the second edition of the 2010 Champions League Twenty20, finishing runners-up to Murali Vijay in the Golden Bat table. Davy Jacobs along with Ashwell Prince set the record for the highest ever opening stand in Champions League T20 history (147).

He has represented the South Africa A cricket team on several occasions. Captained the South African Emerging Squad to Australia, and also led the South African Sixes team to victory in the Hong Kong Sixes Tournament in 2009.

He was signed up by Mumbai Indians, an Indian Premier League franchise, in the 2011 player auction. Despite his tournament being cut short due to injury, he lived up to his reputation.

He represented Trinidad & Tobago Red Steel in the 2013 Caribbean Premier League tournament in the Caribbean.

In February 2015, he retired from cricket after playing in 91 first class matches in which he scored 5520 runs with 14 hundreds. He also played 106 matches with a strike rate of 81.27. Jacobs played 83 matches scoring 1707 runs at an average of 25.86 with eight half-century.

In October 2018, he was named at the captain of Canada's squad for the 2018–19 Regional Super50 tournament in the West Indies. In April 2019, he was named as the captain of Canada's squad for the 2019 ICC World Cricket League Division Two tournament in Namibia.

In June 2019, he was selected to play for the Edmonton Royals franchise team in the 2019 Global T20 Canada tournament.

== Coaching career ==
Jacobs is currently head of Ontario Cricket Academy where he plays as player-cum-coach.
