= Jaskaran Singh (Canada cricketer) =

Indian cricketer (born 1989)

Personal information
- Full name: Jaskaran Singh Buttar
- Born: 4 September 1989 (age 37); Mohali, India
- Batting: Right-handed
- Bowling: Right-arm medium
- Role: Bowler

International information
- National side: Canada
- ODI debut (cap 116): 27 August 2025 v Namibia
- Last ODI: 2 September 2025 v Namibia
- T20I debut (cap 76): 19 April 2025 v Bermuda
- Last T20I: 22 June 2025 v Bermuda

Domestic team information
- Years: Team
- 2008/09–2015/16: Punjab
- 2009–2010: Deccan Chargers
- 2019/20-2021/22: Chandigarh

Career statistics
| Competition | ODI | T20I | FC | LA |
|---|---|---|---|---|
| Matches | 3 | 12 | 16 | 33 |
| Runs scored | 38 | 109 | 332 | 415 |
| Batting average | 12.66 | 27.25 | 25.53 | 20.75 |
| 100s/50s | 0/0 | 0/1 | 0/2 | 0/1 |
| Top score | 32 | 60* | 60* | 51 |
| Balls bowled | 150 | 176 | 2,134 | 1,602 |
| Wickets | 4 | 12 | 30 | 49 |
| Bowling average | 33.75 | 18.41 | 37.73 | 31.18 |
| 5 wickets in innings | 0 | 0 | 0 | 0 |
| 10 wickets in match | 0 | 0 | 0 | 0 |
| Best bowling | 3/71 | 3/11 | 3/45 | 4/44 |
| Catches/stumpings | 0/– | 3/– | 3/– | 6/– |
- Source: ESPNcricinfo, 13 October 2025

Jaskarandeep Singh Buttar (born 4 September 1989) an Indian-born cricketer who plays for the Canada national cricket team. Domestically he has represented Punjab, Chandigarh and Deccan Chargers.
