= Mohnish Mishra =

Indian cricketer (born 1984)

Personal information
- Full name: Mohnish Dinesh Mishra
- Born: 9 February 1984 (age 42); Bhopal, Madhya Pradesh, India
- Batting: Right-handed
- Bowling: Right arm off spin
- Role: Batsman

Domestic team information
- Years: Team
- 2000/01–present: Madhya Pradesh
- 2007/08–2008/09: Delhi Giants
- 2010: Deccan Chargers
- 2011–2012: Pune Warriors India

Career statistics
Competition	FC	List A	T20
Matches	49	37	48
Runs scored	2,742	1,242	899
Batting average	39.73	36.52	20.43
100s/50s	6/13	2/6	0/3
Top score	214	117	84
Balls bowled	78	–	–
Wickets	0	–	–
Bowling average	–	–	–
5 wickets in innings	–	–	–
10 wickets in match	–	–	–
Best bowling	–	–	–
Catches/stumpings	22/–	14/–	14/–
- Source: ESPNcricinfo, 27 January 2025

Mohnish Dinesh Mishra (born 9 February 1984) is an Indian cricketer. He is a right-handed batsman and a right-arm off-break bowler. He was banned from Indian cricket over signing up with the rebel ICL. Subsequently, Mishra left the ICL and, following an amnesty offer from BCCI, returned to Indian domestic cricket.

A middle-order batsman, Mishra made his first-class cricket debut for Madhya Pradesh against Railways in 2000/01 at the age of 16. However, he played just two games in that season. He also represented India at the ICC Under-19 World Cup in 2002. He then went through a period of four years without competitive cricket as he failed to impress the selectors of his state team. He made a comeback during the 2005/06 season, but his domestic career was cut short after he signed up with the Delhi Giants team in the now-defunct Indian Cricket League. Eventually, the BCCI revoked its ban on the ICL players and Mishra returned to playing for his state team in 2009 and has been a regular member of the playing XI ever since. He signed up for Deccan Chargers in the Indian Premier League (IPL) in 2010. Mishra went on to play 11 matches for them that season. He had a highly successful first-class season in 2010/11 as he accumulated 718 runs in 9 matches at an average of 59.83. In 2011, he signed a contract with the new IPL franchise Pune Warriors India.

He was suspended on 15 May 2012 over spot-fixing, after a local news channel, India TV accused him along with four other players based on a sting operation. After the corruption probe in June, Mishra was handed a one-year ban for bringing the game into disrepute while his Madhya Pradesh teammate TP Sudhindra was given a life-ban after he was found guilty of the charges.
