= Tirumalasetti Suman =

Indian cricketer (born 1983)

Personal information
- Full name: Tirumalasetti Suman
- Born: 15 December 1983 (age 42); Hyderabad, Telangana State, India
- Batting: Right-handed
- Bowling: Right-arm off break
- Role: Batsman

Domestic team information
- Years: Team
- 2002/03–2004/05, 2006/07–2015/16: Hyderabad
- 2005/06: Andhra
- 2009–2010: Deccan Chargers
- 2011–2012: Mumbai Indians
- 2013: Pune Warriors

Career statistics
Competition	FC	LA	T20
Matches	38	47	75
Runs scored	1,668	1,159	1,546
Batting average	28.27	25.19	24.53
100s/50s	3/7	3/4	1/5
Top score	160	136	100
Balls bowled	937	607	426
Wickets	9	14	17
Bowling average	54.22	40.35	33.11
5 wickets in innings	0	0	0
10 wickets in match	0	0	0
Best bowling	3/63	3/31	2/14
Catches/stumpings	18/0	13/0	21/0
- Source: ESPNcricinfo, 23 June 2018

Tirumalasetti Laxminarayana Suman (born 15 December 1983) is an Indian former first-class cricketer. He made his debut in first-class cricket for Hyderabad. He is a right-handed batsman who either opens the innings or bats in the middle order. In the second season of the Indian Premier League in 2009, Suman represented Deccan Chargers with success. In the third season he helped the Chargers to the semi-finals. Mumbai Indians signed him for the 2011 season and Pune Warriors in the 2013 season.
