= Harmeet Singh Bansal =

Indian cricketer (born 1987)

Personal information
- Full name: Harmeet Singh Bansal
- Born: 9 October 1987 (age 39); Jodhpur, Rajasthan, India
- Batting: Right-handed
- Bowling: Right-arm medium
- Role: Bowler

Domestic team information
- Years: Team
- 2009–present: Punjab cricket team
- 2009–2011: Deccan Chargers
- 2012–2013: Kings XI Punjab
- FC debut: 3 November 2009 Punjab v Mumbai
- LA debut: 17 February 2009 Punjab v Delhi

Career statistics
Competition	FC	LA	T20
Matches	11	2	25
Runs scored	110	4	15
Batting average	10	4	5
100s/50s	0/0	0	0/0
Top score	29*	4	14
Balls bowled	1973	90	463
Wickets	28	2	21
Bowling average	32.18	35	29.67
5 wickets in innings	0	0	0
10 wickets in match	0	0	0
Best bowling	4/32	2/33	3/24
Catches/stumpings	3/0	0/0	5/0
- Source: ESPNcricinfo, 16 May 2016

Harmeet Singh Bansal (born 9 October 1987) is an Indian cricketer. He represents Punjab as a right arm medium bowler.

He was associated with the Deccan Chargers from 2009 to 2011. He was part of the Deccan Chargers team that won IPL 2009. In the players auction for IPL 2012, he was bought by Kings XI Punjab. In IPL 2012 he played 7 matches and got only 6 wickets.
