= Ishan Malhotra =

Indian cricketer

Personal information
- Full name: Ishan Malhotra
- Born: May 22, 1984 (age 42); Srinagar, Jammu and Kashmir, India
- Batting: Right-handed
- Bowling: Right-arm medium-fast
- Role: Bowler

Domestic team information
- Years: Team
- 2001–2007: Punjab
- 2011: Deccan Chargers
- 2021: Maratha Arabians
- Source: , 8 May 2025

Ishan Malhotra (born 22 May 1984 in Srinagar, Jammu and Kashmir) is an Indian former cricketer who played for the Chandigarh Lions in the Indian Cricket League (ICL) having previously represented Punjab cricket team. He also played for the Maratha Arabians in the Abu Dhabi T10 league.

He was a bowling all-rounder, who batted right-handed and played for Punjab between 2001 and 2007 before switching to the ICL. In that period he played nine first-class matches for his state scoring 224 runs and taking 33 wickets. He played 10 List A matches for his state and took four wickets and in four Twenty20 matches he took two wickets. He made his first-class debut against Assam and took figures of 7/59 (seven wickets and conceding 59 runs).

He was picked by Deccan Chargers in the IPL but only played a solitary game for them during which he bowled a single over which was hit for 23 by Virender Sehwag who went onto score a 48 ball century.

He played for Maratha Arabians during the 2021 Abu Dhabi T10 league appearing in 6 matches, scoring 36 runs but failing to take a wicket.
