= R. P. Singh =

Indian cricket player

Personal information
- Full name: Rudra Pratap Singh
- Born: 6 December 1985 (age 40); Raebareli, Uttar Pradesh, India
- Batting: Right-handed
- Bowling: Left-arm fast-medium
- Role: Bowler

International information
- National side: India (2005–2011)
- Test debut: 21 January 2006 v Pakistan
- Last Test: 18 August 2011 v England
- ODI debut (cap 165): 4 September 2005 v Zimbabwe
- Last ODI: 16 September 2011 v England
- ODI shirt no.: 9
- T20I debut (cap 13): 13 September 2007 v Scotland
- Last T20I: 16 June 2009 v South Africa

Domestic team information
- Years: Team
- 2003–2015: Uttar Pradesh
- 2007: Leicestershire
- 2008–2010: Deccan Chargers
- 2011: Kochi Tuskers Kerala
- 2012: Mumbai Indians
- 2013: Royal Challengers Bangalore
- 2015–2018: Gujarat
- 2016: Rising Pune Supergiants

Career statistics
Competition	Test	ODI	T20I	FC
Matches	14	58	10	94
Runs scored	116	104	3	922
Batting average	7.25	10.40	–	10.13
100s/50s	0/0	0/0	0/0	0/0
Top score	30	23	2*	47
Balls bowled	2,534	2,565	198	17,192
Wickets	40	69	15	301
Bowling average	42.05	33.95	15.00	30.57
5 wickets in innings	1	0	0	12
10 wickets in match	0	0	0	1
Best bowling	5/59	4/35	4/13	6/50
Catches/stumpings	6/–	13/–	2/–	35/–
Medal record
Men's Cricket
Representing India
ICC T20 World Cup
Winner	2007 South Africa
ACC Asia Cup
Runner-up	2008 Pakistan
- Source: CricketArchive, 28 October 2017

Rudra Pratap Singh (born 6 December 1985), popularly known as R.P. Singh, is an Indian former cricketer, who played for the India national cricket team in Test, One Day International and Twenty20 International cricket as a left arm fast-medium bowler. He is current selector of senior men's Indian cricket team. In September 2018, he announced his retirement from all forms of cricket. He was a member of the Indian team that won the 2007 T20 World Cup. He pursued a Bachelor of Arts degree from the University of Lucknow.

== Early career ==
He first came in contention during the Under-19 World Cup in Bangladesh in 2004, when he took eight wickets for a very impressive average of 24.75. He later performed consistently in the Ranji Trophy for Uttar Pradesh and impressive performances saw him earn a place in the ODI side in 2005.

== International career ==
In his third one-day match, Singh got his first man of the match award as he played his part as India restricted Sri Lanka to a modest 196 all out. Swinging the ball on a batting wicket, he took 4 important wickets to rattle Sri Lanka. His bowling figures of 8.5 overs, 2 maidens, 35 runs and 4 wickets announced his arrival on the international stage. Singh was selected to make his Test debut in the 2nd Test against Pakistan in Faisalabad, Pakistan in January 2006. He won the man of the match award on his debut after taking 5 wickets in the match.

Singh's 4 wicket-haul in the fourth match of the one-day series against Pakistan in 2006, helped India take an unassailable 3–1 lead in the series, and won him the man of the match award. India went on to win the series 4–1.

Singh was favoured to Sreesanth for the 2006 ICC Champions Trophy due to his superior economy rate. However, he was unable to maintain his level of performance, and was dropped from the side.

Singh was included in the Test squad for the tour to England and performed well, taking 5/59 at Lord's, his first five-wicket-haul in Tests. In the one-day series he took seven wickets at 31.71 from five matches.

Singh was selected to play in the 2007 ICC World Twenty20 tournament in South Africa in September 2007. Singh emerged as the second-highest wicket-taker in the entire competition, taking 12 wickets in 7 matches at an average of 12.66 runs per wicket. India won the 12-nation tournament after beating Pakistan in the final. R.P. Singh's best figures were 4/13 in 4 overs in India's final Super-8 stage match in which they eliminated South Africa from the tournament.

Singh was then selected for India's one-day home series against Australia and Pakistan that followed, playing four games in each series and picking up a total of 11 wickets.

In August 2011 RP Singh was called up to the India squad for the remainder of the tour of England, he was recalled after a 3-year test absence due to an injury picked up Zaheer Khan which ruled him out of the tour.

Singh played in the fourth test match of the series. Bowling the first over, his first four deliveries were down the leg side. Singh seemed more like a club bowler. His pace was drastically reduced to 120 km/h, and he seemed no threat to the England batsmen. Sir Ian Botham described it as one of the worst opening overs of test cricket he had seen. Sunil Gavaskar also criticised his selection as he was unfit. Other cricket experts and former players felt that Singh was selected only because of his close proximity with then Indian captain MS Dhoni.

== Domestic career ==
In 2006 it was announced that Singh would be signing for English side Leicestershire as their second overseas signing. He was however unexpectedly recalled to the Indian side following their poor World Cup campaign and only made a handful of appearances.

In 2015, he switched from Uttar Pradesh to Gujarat in domestic cricket.

=== Indian Premier League ===
In the second season of the Indian Premier League, Singh was highly successful and he emerged as the highest wicket taker of the tournament, with 23 from 16 matches thereby winning the Purple Cap. Deccan Chargers emerged as winners of the tournament. His performance early in the tournament earned him a spot in the Indian squad for the 2009 ICC World Twenty20.

He later played for the Kochi Tuskers, after signing for them in 2011 from the Deccan Chargers. He was bought for $600,000 by the Mumbai Indians in the Indian Premier League Players Auction, 2012. In the year 2013 in the IPL he was bought by Royal Challengers Bangalore in the players auction 2013 for $400,000. In the 2014 IPL Auctions, he was unsold and had a base price of Rs 1 crore. He played a few matches for Rising Pune Supergiants in the 2016 Indian Premier League.
