= Doug Bollinger =

Australian cricketer

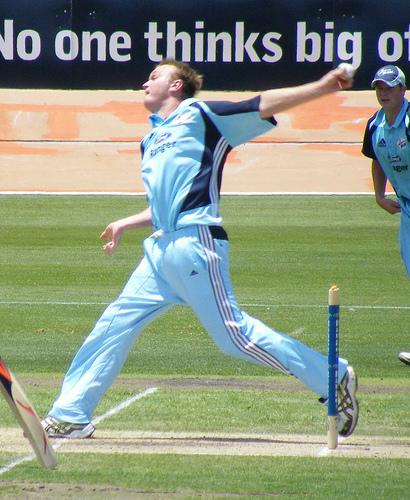
- Bollinger playing for New South Wales, 2008

Personal information
- Full name: Douglas Erwin Bollinger
- Born: 24 July 1981 (age 45); Baulkham Hills, New South Wales, Australia
- Nickname: Doug The Rug
- Height: 1.92 m (6 ft 4 in)
- Batting: Left-handed
- Bowling: Left-arm fast
- Role: Bowler

International information
- National side: Australia (2009–2014)
- Test debut (cap 405): 3 January 2009 v South Africa
- Last Test: 3 December 2010 v England
- ODI debut (cap 175): 24 April 2009 v Pakistan
- Last ODI: 28 October 2011 v South Africa
- ODI shirt no.: 4
- T20I debut (cap 50): 13 October 2011 v South Africa
- Last T20I: 9 November 2014 v South Africa

Domestic team information
- Years: Team
- 2002/03–2017/18: New South Wales (squad no. 46)
- 2007: Worcestershire
- 2010–2012: Chennai Super Kings
- 2011/12: Sydney Thunder
- 2012/13–2014/15: Hobart Hurricanes
- 2014: Kent
- 2014/15–2017/18: Sydney Sixers

Career statistics
Competition	Test	ODI	FC	LA
Matches	12	39	124	134
Runs scored	54	50	697	185
Batting average	7.71	8.33	8.82	10.27
100s/50s	0/0	0/0	0/0	0/0
Top score	21	30	41*	30
Balls bowled	2,401	1,942	21,874	6,851
Wickets	50	62	411	203
Bowling average	25.92	23.90	28.06	27.12
5 wickets in innings	2	2	16	3
10 wickets in match	0	0	2	0
Best bowling	5/28	5/35	6/47	5/35
Catches/stumpings	2/–	12/–	47/–	29/–
Medal record
Winner	2009 South Africa
- Source: ESPNcricinfo, 5 February 2018

Douglas Erwin Bollinger (born 24 July 1981) is a former Australian cricketer. He has played first-class cricket for the New South Wales cricket team and international cricket for Australia. He is a left-handed batsman and a left-arm fast bowler. Bollinger has played for Worcestershire County Cricket Club and Kent County Cricket Club in England, for the Chennai Super Kings in the Indian Premier League and for Hobart Hurricanes, Sydney Thunder and Sydney Sixers in domestic T20 competition. He announced his retirement from all forms of cricket on 5 February 2018. Bollinger was a member of the Australian squad which won the 2009 ICC Champions Trophy.

== Domestic career ==
A resident of Seven Hills he commenced his playing career at 15 with Seven Hills Toongabbie RSL Cricket Club where he was noted as being no more than an enthusiastic but erratic bowler during his early days. He played 3 seasons at Seven Hills before being given an opportunity by Grant Lambert to play grade cricket for Fairfield-Liverpool.

The left-armer debuted for New South Wales in 2002–03. In the 2004–05 season, in an ING Cup match against South Australia, he picked up a hat-trick in dismissing the Redbacks' brittle top order. Following this innings, he did not continue this form. He generated some success in the One-Day form of the game, taking 27 wickets at an average of 28.32 in 20 matches leading to the Australian selectors naming him in a 30-man squad for the ICC champions trophy tournament in India. Bollinger was one of a select group of up and coming Australian cricketers who have spent time at the Commonwealth Bank Centre of Excellence honing their cricket skills, in the hope of gaining national selection.

== International career ==
The end of 2006–07 season saw the retirement of Glenn McGrath, who is the fifth highest wicket-taker in Test history, opening up a bowling position in the Australian team. Bollinger staked his claim early in the summer. He took a five wicket haul in NSW Pura cup match against WA. In a devastating spell of pace and swing not seen at the WACA for some years Bollinger claimed yet another hat-trick and ended up with the figures of 5/38. He made his Test debut for Australia on 3 January 2009 in the Third Test against South Africa at the SCG.

On 1 May 2009, Bollinger claimed his first ODI five-wicket haul, which came against Pakistan at Sheikh Zayed Stadium in Abu Dhabi. He picked up 5/35 and won his first Man of the Match award. In the 6th ODI versus India at Guwahati, he took 4 wickets and was declared as the Man of the match again.

Bollinger was once again drafted into the Australian XI for the second of three Tests against the West Indies in November – December 2009 following injuries to leading pacemen Ben Hilfenhaus and Peter Siddle. He took 5 wickets in the match at Adelaide, and continued his good bowling form into the third and final Test, taking career best figures of 5/70 in the first innings and 8/141 for the match.

On 21 January 2011, in an ODI match against England at Hobart, Bollinger scored 30 runs—his highest ever ODI score—in a record ninth wicket partnership with Shaun Marsh. In England's innings, Bollinger was the pick of the Australian bowlers, taking 4/28, as Australia went on to win the match by 46 runs.

Doug Bollinger was ruled out of the World Cup in 2011 due to an ankle injury, and was forced to fly home.

== Indian Premier League ==
Bollinger was signed up by Chennai Super Kings for the 2010 Indian Premier League. He has been included in the roster after the Super Kings' all-rounder Jacob Oram confirmed his unavailability for the season due to injury. Bollinger arrived for the second half of the tournament after the end of the tour of New Zealand. Bollinger is the fourth Australian to play for the Super Kings after Matthew Hayden, Michael Hussey and George Bailey. In his IPL debut, he helped Chennai defend a total of 246 against Rajasthan by taking a catch off Yusuf Pathan which was going for a six; he backpedalled and caught the ball and had to throw it up in the air before falling over the rope and then rebalancing himself to complete the catch. This earned him an award for the best catch of the match. He delivered a spell of 2/15 from four overs dismissing Shane Watson who got 60 off just 25 balls in a match which the other Chennai bowlers averaged 13 runs per over in contrast to his 3.75. Rajasthan ended their innings at 223.

His effort against Kolkata with a spell of 4–1–15–2 helped restrict them to 139 in a crucial match, and the target was chased down by Chennai by nine wickets. Against Delhi, he got Virender Sehwag and Tillakaratne Dilshan out in his very first over bringing them to a worrying score of 6/3. However, they were only defending a low total of 112 and lost. He ended his spell at 4–0–24–2. In the semi-final against the Deccan Chargers, Bollinger bowled an excellent spell of 4/13 to help Chennai crush the defending champions while defending a low total. This helped them in reaching the final and they eventually won the third edition of the tournament by defeating the Mumbai Indians in the final. Bollinger was greatly responsible for bringing the turnaround in the team's fortunes. Before his arrival they had won only three of their eight games.

Bollinger was bought by the Chennai Super Kings in the 2011 IPL auction for US$0.7 Million. He could not participate in the first three matches due to illness. However, he confirmed his fitness and had been included in the later part of the tournament. He was awarded the man of the match for his impressive spell against the Pune Warriors India, taking 3/21 in his four overs.
