= 2010 Champions League Twenty20 =

International cricket tournament

- Administrators: BCCI; Cricket Australia; Cricket South Africa
- Cricket format: Twenty20
- Tournament format(s): Round-robin and knockout
- Host: South Africa
- Champions: Chennai Super Kings (1st title)
- Runners-up: Warriors
- Participants: 10
- Matches: 23
- Player of the series: Ravichandran Ashwin
- Most runs: Murali Vijay (294)
- Most wickets: Ravichandran Ashwin (13)

The 2010 Champions League Twenty20 was the second edition of the Champions League Twenty20, an international Twenty20 cricket tournament. The tournament, which was held from 10 to 26 September 2010 in South Africa, featured ten teams from Australia, India, New Zealand, South Africa, Sri Lanka, and the West Indies. Chennai Super Kings won the tournament, defeating the Warriors in the final.

== Host selection ==
In February 2010, Cricket South Africa announced that the country had been chosen to host the tournament, although this was later denied by tournament chairman Lalit Modi, who listed a range of possibilities as hosts. At the conclusion of the 2010 Indian Premier League in April, South Africa was confirmed as the venue for the tournament. The country had previously hosted the 2009 Indian Premier League.

== Format ==
The tournament consisted of 23 matches, divided into a group stage and a knockout stage. In the group stage, teams were divided into two groups of five teams, with each team playing each other team in its group once. The top two teams from each group advanced to the semi-finals.

=== Prize money ===
Unchanged from the previous edition, the total prize money for the competition was US$6 million. In addition to the prize money, each team received a participation fee of $500,000.

Following the tournament, several teams reported delays in receiving their prize money. By June 2011, the Australian and South African teams had been paid, while teams from other countries, including New Zealand's Central Districts, were still awaiting payment.

== Teams ==
The tournament was reduced from 12 teams to ten because the tournament dates clashed with the end of the English domestic season, preventing teams from the England and Wales Cricket Board from taking part.

Pakistani teams did not take part in the tournament, as in 2009. Ijaz Butt, the chairman of the Pakistan Cricket Board, had reportedly refused an invitation for a Pakistani team to take part due to no Pakistani cricketers being purchased during the 2010 Indian Premier League player auction. Butt later stated his comments were misunderstood, but tournament administrators had already made the decision to omit a Pakistani team.

Cricket Board	Domestic tournament	Number of teams	Qualified teams
Australia	2009–10 KFC Twenty20 Big Bash	2	Southern Redbacks; Victorian Bushrangers
India	2010 Indian Premier League	3	Chennai Super Kings; Mumbai Indians; Royal Challengers Bangalore
New Zealand	2009–10 HRV Cup	1	Central Districts Stags
South Africa	2009–10 Standard Bank Pro20	2	Highveld Lions; Warriors
Sri Lanka	2009–10 Inter-Provincial Twenty20	1	Wayamba Elevens
West Indies	2010 Caribbean Twenty20	1	Guyana

== Squads ==
Several teams were missing star players that helped them qualify for the tournament, mostly due to their commitment to another qualified team or to their national team. In the case of a player being a part of more than one qualified team, he can play for his "home" team (the team from the country he is eligible to represent in international cricket) without consequence. If he plays for any other team, that team must pay the home team US$200,000 as compensation. The Royal Challengers Bangalore were the only team to pay the compensation, forcing three international players to play for them instead of their home team. Jacques Kallis, Cameron White and Ross Taylor were obligated to play for Bangalore as their contracts stated Bangalore had first rights over them should they qualify for the tournament with another team.

== Venues ==

Matches were played at four venues in South Africa. Both Warriors and Highveld Lions played some of their group stage matches at their home grounds, St George's Park and Wanderers Stadium, and the semi-finals were held at Kingsmead Cricket Ground and Supersport Park. The final was held at Wanderers.

== Fixtures and results ==
All times shown are in South African Standard Time (UTC+02).

=== Group stage ===
==== Group A ====
Pos	Team	Pld	W	L	NR	Pts	NRR
1	Chennai Super Kings	4	3	1	0	6	2.050
2	Warriors	4	3	1	0	6	0.588
3	Victorian Bushrangers	4	3	1	0	6	0.366
4	Wayamba Elevens	4	1	3	0	2	−1.126
5	Central Districts Stags	4	0	4	0	0	−1.844

Source: "Champions League Twenty20 Table - 2010". ESPN.

11 September	Wayamba Elevens; 153/9 (20 overs)	v	Warriors; 156/3 (18.3 overs)	Warriors won by 7 wickets
13:30; Scorecard	Wayamba Elevens; 153/9 (20 overs)	v	Warriors; 156/3 (18.3 overs)	St George's Park, Port Elizabeth; Umpires: Aleem Dar (Pak) and Johanes Cloete (SA); Player of the match: Juan Theron (WAR)
13:30; Scorecard	Jeevantha Kulatunga 59 (44); Juan Theron 3/23 (4 overs)		Mark Boucher 40* (26); Rangana Herath 1/18 (4 overs)	St George's Park, Port Elizabeth; Umpires: Aleem Dar (Pak) and Johanes Cloete (SA); Player of the match: Juan Theron (WAR)
Wayamba Elevens won the toss and elected to bat.				St George's Park, Port Elizabeth; Umpires: Aleem Dar (Pak) and Johanes Cloete (SA); Player of the match: Juan Theron (WAR)

11 September	Chennai Super Kings; 151/4 (20 overs)	v	Central Districts Stags; 94 (18.1 overs)	Chennai Super Kings won by 57 runs
17:30 (D/N); Scorecard	Chennai Super Kings; 151/4 (20 overs)	v	Central Districts Stags; 94 (18.1 overs)	Sahara Stadium Kingsmead, Durban; Umpires: Marais Erasmus (SA) and Paul Reiffel (Aus); Player of the match: Subramaniam Badrinath (CSK)
17:30 (D/N); Scorecard	Subramaniam Badrinath 52* (42); Doug Bracewell 2/28 (4 overs)		Doug Bracewell 30 (28); Lakshmipathy Balaji 3/20 (4 overs)	Sahara Stadium Kingsmead, Durban; Umpires: Marais Erasmus (SA) and Paul Reiffel (Aus); Player of the match: Subramaniam Badrinath (CSK)
Chennai Super Kings won the toss and elected to bat.				Sahara Stadium Kingsmead, Durban; Umpires: Marais Erasmus (SA) and Paul Reiffel (Aus); Player of the match: Subramaniam Badrinath (CSK)

13 September	Warriors; 158/6 (20 overs)	v	Victorian Bushrangers; 130/9 (20 overs)	Warriors won by 28 runs
17:30 (D/N); Scorecard	Warriors; 158/6 (20 overs)	v	Victorian Bushrangers; 130/9 (20 overs)	St George's Park, Port Elizabeth; Umpires: Shavir Tarapore (Ind) and Rod Tucker (Aus); Player of the match: David Jacobs (WAR)
17:30 (D/N); Scorecard	Davey Jacobs 59 (38); Andrew McDonald 2/22 (4 overs)		David Hussey 29 (27); Juan Theron 3/22 (4 overs)	St George's Park, Port Elizabeth; Umpires: Shavir Tarapore (Ind) and Rod Tucker (Aus); Player of the match: David Jacobs (WAR)
Warriors won the toss and elected to bat.				St George's Park, Port Elizabeth; Umpires: Shavir Tarapore (Ind) and Rod Tucker (Aus); Player of the match: David Jacobs (WAR)

15 September	Central Districts Stags; 165/5 (20 overs)	v	Victorian Bushrangers; 166/3 (19.4 overs)	Victorian Bushrangers won by 7 wickets
13:30; Scorecard	Central Districts Stags; 165/5 (20 overs)	v	Victorian Bushrangers; 166/3 (19.4 overs)	SuperSport Park, Centurion; Umpires: Asad Rauf (Pak) and Paul Reiffel (Aus); Player of the match: Aaron Finch (VIC)
13:30; Scorecard	Jamie How 77* (55); Peter Siddle 2/30 (3 overs)		Aaron Finch 93* (60); Seth Rance 1/30 (4 overs)	SuperSport Park, Centurion; Umpires: Asad Rauf (Pak) and Paul Reiffel (Aus); Player of the match: Aaron Finch (VIC)
Central Districts Stags won the toss and elected to bat.				SuperSport Park, Centurion; Umpires: Asad Rauf (Pak) and Paul Reiffel (Aus); Player of the match: Aaron Finch (VIC)

15 September	Chennai Super Kings; 200/3 (20 overs)	v	Wayamba Elevens; 103 (17.1 overs)	Chennai Super Kings won by 97 runs
17:30 (D/N); Scorecard	Chennai Super Kings; 200/3 (20 overs)	v	Wayamba Elevens; 103 (17.1 overs)	SuperSport Park, Centurion; Umpires: Marais Erasmus (SA) and Amish Saheba (Ind); Player of the match: Suresh Raina (CSK)
17:30 (D/N); Scorecard	Suresh Raina 87 (44); Chanaka Welegedara 2/47 (4 overs)		Shalika Karunanayake 25 (31); Ravichandran Ashwin 4/18 (4 overs)	SuperSport Park, Centurion; Umpires: Marais Erasmus (SA) and Amish Saheba (Ind); Player of the match: Suresh Raina (CSK)
Wayamba Elevens won the toss and elected to field.				SuperSport Park, Centurion; Umpires: Marais Erasmus (SA) and Amish Saheba (Ind); Player of the match: Suresh Raina (CSK)

18 September	Central Districts Stags; 175/3 (20 overs)	v	Warriors; 181/4 (19.1 overs)	Warriors won by 6 wickets
13:30; Scorecard	Central Districts Stags; 175/3 (20 overs)	v	Warriors; 181/4 (19.1 overs)	St George's Park, Port Elizabeth; Umpires: Paul Reiffel (Aus) and Amiesh Saheba (Ind); Player of the match: Davey Jacobs (WAR)
13:30; Scorecard	Jamie How 88* (57); Johan Botha 1/16 (4 overs)		Davey Jacobs 74 (47); Kieran Noema-Barnett 2/28 (4 overs)	St George's Park, Port Elizabeth; Umpires: Paul Reiffel (Aus) and Amiesh Saheba (Ind); Player of the match: Davey Jacobs (WAR)
Central Districts Stags won the toss and elected to bat.				St George's Park, Port Elizabeth; Umpires: Paul Reiffel (Aus) and Amiesh Saheba (Ind); Player of the match: Davey Jacobs (WAR)

18 September	Chennai Super Kings; 162/6 (20 overs)	v	Victorian Bushrangers; 162 (20 overs)	Scores level; Victorian Bushrangers won by Super Over
17:30 (D/N); Scorecard	Chennai Super Kings; 162/6 (20 overs)	v	Victorian Bushrangers; 162 (20 overs)	St George's Park, Port Elizabeth; Umpires: Asad Rauf (Pak) and Marais Erasmus (SA); Player of the match: Aaron Finch (VIC)
17:30 (D/N); Scorecard	Murali Vijay 73 (53); John Hastings 2/22 (4 overs)		David Hussey 51 (45); Suresh Raina 4/26 (4 overs)	St George's Park, Port Elizabeth; Umpires: Asad Rauf (Pak) and Marais Erasmus (SA); Player of the match: Aaron Finch (VIC)
Chennai Super Kings won the toss and elected to bat.				St George's Park, Port Elizabeth; Umpires: Asad Rauf (Pak) and Marais Erasmus (SA); Player of the match: Aaron Finch (VIC)

20 September	Wayamba Elevens; 106 (16.3 overs)	v	Victorian Bushrangers; 108/2 (13.2 overs)	Victorian Bushrangers won by 8 wickets
17:30 (D/N); Scorecard	Wayamba Elevens; 106 (16.3 overs)	v	Victorian Bushrangers; 108/2 (13.2 overs)	SuperSport Park, Centurion; Umpires: Asad Rauf (Pak) and Amiesh Saheba (Ind); Player of the match: Peter Siddle (VIC)
17:30 (D/N); Scorecard	Mahela Jayawardene 51 (40); Peter Siddle 4/29 (4 overs)		David Hussey 47* (28); Thisara Perera 1/13 (2 overs)	SuperSport Park, Centurion; Umpires: Asad Rauf (Pak) and Amiesh Saheba (Ind); Player of the match: Peter Siddle (VIC)
Wayamba Elevens won the toss and elected to bat.				SuperSport Park, Centurion; Umpires: Asad Rauf (Pak) and Amiesh Saheba (Ind); Player of the match: Peter Siddle (VIC)

22 September	Wayamba Elevens; 144/6 (20 overs)	v	Central Districts Stags; 70 (15.3 overs)	Wayamba Elevens won by 74 runs
13:30; Scorecard	Wayamba Elevens; 144/6 (20 overs)	v	Central Districts Stags; 70 (15.3 overs)	St George's Park, Port Elizabeth; Umpires: Asoka de Silva (SL) and Bruce Oxenford (Aus); Player of the match: Isuru Udana (WMB)
13:30; Scorecard	Jehan Mubarak 30 (26); Michael Mason 2/16 (4 overs)		Bevan Griggs 19 (22); Ajantha Mendis 3/14 (3 overs)	St George's Park, Port Elizabeth; Umpires: Asoka de Silva (SL) and Bruce Oxenford (Aus); Player of the match: Isuru Udana (WMB)
Wayamba Elevens won the toss and elected to bat.				St George's Park, Port Elizabeth; Umpires: Asoka de Silva (SL) and Bruce Oxenford (Aus); Player of the match: Isuru Udana (WMB)

22 September	Chennai Super Kings; 136/6 (20 overs)	v	Warriors; 126/8 (20 overs)	Chennai Super Kings won by 10 runs
17:30 (D/N); Scorecard	Chennai Super Kings; 136/6 (20 overs)	v	Warriors; 126/8 (20 overs)	St George's Park, Port Elizabeth; Umpires: Brian Jerling (SA) and Rudi Koertzen (SA); Player of the match: Michael Hussey (CSK)
17:30 (D/N); Scorecard	Michael Hussey 50 (39); Justin Kreusch 3/19 (4 overs)		Davey Jacobs 32 (31); Ravichandran Ashwin 3/24 (4 overs)	St George's Park, Port Elizabeth; Umpires: Brian Jerling (SA) and Rudi Koertzen (SA); Player of the match: Michael Hussey (CSK)
Chennai Super Kings won the toss and elected to bat.				St George's Park, Port Elizabeth; Umpires: Brian Jerling (SA) and Rudi Koertzen (SA); Player of the match: Michael Hussey (CSK)

==== Group B ====
Pos	Team	Pld	W	L	NR	Pts	NRR
1	Southern Redbacks	4	4	0	0	8	0.589
2	Royal Challengers Bangalore	4	2	2	0	4	0.759
3	Highveld Lions	4	2	2	0	4	0.401
4	Mumbai Indians	4	2	2	0	4	0.221
5	Guyana	4	0	4	0	0	−2.083

Source: "Champions League Twenty20 Table - 2010". ESPN.

10 September	Highveld Lions; 186/5 (20 overs)	v	Mumbai Indians; 177/6 (20 overs)	Lions won by 9 runs
17:30 (D/N); Scorecard	Highveld Lions; 186/5 (20 overs)	v	Mumbai Indians; 177/6 (20 overs)	New Wanderers Stadium, Johannesburg; Umpires: Asoka de Silva (SL) and Rudi Koertzen (SA); Player of the match: Jonathan Vandiar (LIO)
17:30 (D/N); Scorecard	Jonathan Vandiar 71 (48); Lasith Malinga 3/33 (4 overs)		Sachin Tendulkar 69 (42); Shane Burger 2/33 (4 overs)	New Wanderers Stadium, Johannesburg; Umpires: Asoka de Silva (SL) and Rudi Koertzen (SA); Player of the match: Jonathan Vandiar (LIO)
Mumbai Indians won the toss and elected to field.				New Wanderers Stadium, Johannesburg; Umpires: Asoka de Silva (SL) and Rudi Koertzen (SA); Player of the match: Jonathan Vandiar (LIO)

12 September	Southern Redbacks; 178/6 (20 overs)	v	Highveld Lions; 167/8 (20 overs)	Southern Redbacks won by 11 runs
13:30; Scorecard	Southern Redbacks; 178/6 (20 overs)	v	Highveld Lions; 167/8 (20 overs)	SuperSport Park, Centurion; Umpires: Asoka De Silva (SL) and Brian Jerling (SA); Player of the match: Michael Klinger (SAR)
13:30; Scorecard	Michael Klinger 78 (48); Aaron Phangiso 1/22 (4 overs)		Alviro Petersen 56 (35); Shaun Tait 3/36 (4 overs)	SuperSport Park, Centurion; Umpires: Asoka De Silva (SL) and Brian Jerling (SA); Player of the match: Michael Klinger (SAR)
Lions won the toss and elected to field.				SuperSport Park, Centurion; Umpires: Asoka De Silva (SL) and Brian Jerling (SA); Player of the match: Michael Klinger (SAR)

12 September	Guyana; 103 (20 overs)	v	Royal Challengers Bangalore; 106/1 (12.2 overs)	Royal Challengers Bangalore won by 9 wickets
17:30 (D/N); Scorecard	Guyana; 103 (20 overs)	v	Royal Challengers Bangalore; 106/1 (12.2 overs)	SuperSport Park, Centurion; Umpires: Rudi Koertzen (SA) and Bruce Oxenford (Aus); Player of the match: Jacques Kallis (RCB)
17:30 (D/N); Scorecard	Christopher Barnwell 30 (35); Jacques Kallis 3/16 (4 overs)		Jacques Kallis 43* (32); Royston Crandon 1/12 (1.2 overs)	SuperSport Park, Centurion; Umpires: Rudi Koertzen (SA) and Bruce Oxenford (Aus); Player of the match: Jacques Kallis (RCB)
Royal Challengers Bangalore won the toss and elected to field.				SuperSport Park, Centurion; Umpires: Rudi Koertzen (SA) and Bruce Oxenford (Aus); Player of the match: Jacques Kallis (RCB)

14 September	Mumbai Indians; 180/7 (20 overs)	v	Southern Redbacks; 182/5 (19.3 overs)	Southern Redbacks won by 5 wickets
17:30 (D/N); Scorecard	Mumbai Indians; 180/7 (20 overs)	v	Southern Redbacks; 182/5 (19.3 overs)	Sahara Stadium Kingsmead, Durban; Umpires: Asoka de Silva (SL) and Rudi Koertzen (SA); Player of the match: Daniel Harris (SAR)
17:30 (D/N); Scorecard	Saurabh Tiwary 44 (36); Aaron O'Brien 2/49 (4 overs)		Daniel Harris 56 (37); Lasith Malinga 2/22 (4 overs)	Sahara Stadium Kingsmead, Durban; Umpires: Asoka de Silva (SL) and Rudi Koertzen (SA); Player of the match: Daniel Harris (SAR)
Mumbai Indians won the toss and elected to bat.				Sahara Stadium Kingsmead, Durban; Umpires: Asoka de Silva (SL) and Rudi Koertzen (SA); Player of the match: Daniel Harris (SAR)

16 September	Mumbai Indians; 184/4 (20 overs)	v	Guyana; 153/6 (20 overs)	Mumbai Indians won by 31 runs
17:30 (D/N); Scorecard	Mumbai Indians; 184/4 (20 overs)	v	Guyana; 153/6 (20 overs)	Sahara Stadium Kingsmead, Durban; Umpires: Aleem Dar (Pak) and Johanes Cloete (SA); Player of the match: Kieron Pollard (MI)
17:30 (D/N); Scorecard	Kieron Pollard 72* (30); Devendra Bishoo 3/34		Ramnaresh Sarwan 46 (38); Dwayne Bravo 2/18	Sahara Stadium Kingsmead, Durban; Umpires: Aleem Dar (Pak) and Johanes Cloete (SA); Player of the match: Kieron Pollard (MI)
Mumbai Indians won the toss and elected to bat.				Sahara Stadium Kingsmead, Durban; Umpires: Aleem Dar (Pak) and Johanes Cloete (SA); Player of the match: Kieron Pollard (MI)

17 September	Royal Challengers Bangalore; 154 (19.5 overs)	v	Southern Redbacks; 155/2 (18.3 overs)	Southern Redbacks won by 8 wickets
17:30 (D/N); Scorecard	Royal Challengers Bangalore; 154 (19.5 overs)	v	Southern Redbacks; 155/2 (18.3 overs)	Sahara Stadium Kingsmead, Durban; Umpires: Shavir Tarapore (Ind) and Rod Tucker (Aus); Player of the match: Michael Klinger (SAR)
17:30 (D/N); Scorecard	Dillon du Preez 46 (25); Daniel Christian 4/23 (3.5 overs)		Michael Klinger 69* (57); Anil Kumble 1/25 (4 overs)	Sahara Stadium Kingsmead, Durban; Umpires: Shavir Tarapore (Ind) and Rod Tucker (Aus); Player of the match: Michael Klinger (SAR)
Royal Challengers Bangalore won the toss and elected to bat.				Sahara Stadium Kingsmead, Durban; Umpires: Shavir Tarapore (Ind) and Rod Tucker (Aus); Player of the match: Michael Klinger (SAR)

19 September	Guyana; 148/9 (20 overs)	v	Highveld Lions; 149/1 (15.1 overs)	Lions won by 9 wickets
13:30; Scorecard	Guyana; 148/9 (20 overs)	v	Highveld Lions; 149/1 (15.1 overs)	New Wanderers Stadium, Johannesburg; Umpires: Brian Jerling (SA) and Bruce Oxenford (Aus); Player of the match: Ethan O'Reilly (LIO)
13:30; Scorecard	Steven Jacobs 34 (37); Ethan O'Reilly 4/27 (4 overs)		Richard Cameron 78* (42); Esuan Crandon 1/34 (4 overs)	New Wanderers Stadium, Johannesburg; Umpires: Brian Jerling (SA) and Bruce Oxenford (Aus); Player of the match: Ethan O'Reilly (LIO)
Lions won the toss and elected to field.				New Wanderers Stadium, Johannesburg; Umpires: Brian Jerling (SA) and Bruce Oxenford (Aus); Player of the match: Ethan O'Reilly (LIO)

19 September	Mumbai Indians; 165/7 (20 overs)	v	Royal Challengers Bangalore; 163/5 (20 overs)	Mumbai Indians won by 2 runs
17:30 (D/N); Scorecard	Mumbai Indians; 165/7 (20 overs)	v	Royal Challengers Bangalore; 163/5 (20 overs)	Sahara Stadium Kingsmead, Durban; Umpires: Aleem Dar (Pak) and Rod Tucker (Aus); Player of the match: Dwayne Bravo (MI)
17:30 (D/N); Scorecard	Shikhar Dhawan 41 (37); Dale Steyn 3/26 (4 overs)		Rahul Dravid 71* (58); Dwayne Bravo 2/23 (4 overs)	Sahara Stadium Kingsmead, Durban; Umpires: Aleem Dar (Pak) and Rod Tucker (Aus); Player of the match: Dwayne Bravo (MI)
Mumbai Indians won the toss and elected to bat.				Sahara Stadium Kingsmead, Durban; Umpires: Aleem Dar (Pak) and Rod Tucker (Aus); Player of the match: Dwayne Bravo (MI)

21 September	Southern Redbacks; 191/6 (20 overs)	v	Guyana; 176/7 (20 overs)	Southern Redbacks won by 15 runs
13:30; Scorecard	Southern Redbacks; 191/6 (20 overs)	v	Guyana; 176/7 (20 overs)	New Wanderers Stadium, Johannesburg; Umpires: Johanes Cloete (SA) and Shavir Tarapore (Ind); Player of the match: Callum Ferguson (SAR)
13:30; Scorecard	Callum Ferguson 55 (37); Paul Wintz 2/11 (3 overs)		Ramnaresh Sarwan 70 (46); Daniel Harris 3/33 (3 overs)	New Wanderers Stadium, Johannesburg; Umpires: Johanes Cloete (SA) and Shavir Tarapore (Ind); Player of the match: Callum Ferguson (SAR)
Guyana won the toss and elected to field.				New Wanderers Stadium, Johannesburg; Umpires: Johanes Cloete (SA) and Shavir Tarapore (Ind); Player of the match: Callum Ferguson (SAR)

21 September	Highveld Lions; 159/6 (20 overs)	v	Royal Challengers Bangalore; 160/4 (19 overs)	Royal Challengers Bangalore won by 6 wickets
17:30 (D/N); Scorecard	Highveld Lions; 159/6 (20 overs)	v	Royal Challengers Bangalore; 160/4 (19 overs)	New Wanderers Stadium, Johannesburg; Umpires: Aleem Dar (Pak) and Rod Tucker (Aus); Player of the match: Virat Kohli (RCB)
17:30 (D/N); Scorecard	Alviro Petersen 45 (29); Vinay Kumar 2/23 (3 overs)		Virat Kohli 49* (29); Cliff Deacon 1/21 (4 overs)	New Wanderers Stadium, Johannesburg; Umpires: Aleem Dar (Pak) and Rod Tucker (Aus); Player of the match: Virat Kohli (RCB)
Lions won the toss and elected to bat.				New Wanderers Stadium, Johannesburg; Umpires: Aleem Dar (Pak) and Rod Tucker (Aus); Player of the match: Virat Kohli (RCB)

=== Knockout stage ===
Semifinals
B1	Southern Redbacks	145/7 (20 ov)
A2	Warriors	175/6 (20 ov)
A1	Chennai Super Kings (D/L)	174/4 (17 ov)
B2	Royal Challengers Bangalore	123/9 (16.3 ov)

Final
A2	Warriors	128/8 (20 ov)
A1	Chennai Super Kings	132/2 (19 ov)

Semi-finals

24 September	Chennai Super Kings; 174/4 (17 overs)	v	Royal Challengers Bangalore; 123/9 (16.3 overs)	Chennai Super Kings won by 52 runs (D/L)
17:30 (D/N); Scorecard	Chennai Super Kings; 174/4 (17 overs)	v	Royal Challengers Bangalore; 123/9 (16.3 overs)	Sahara Stadium Kingsmead, Durban; Umpires: Asad Rauf (Pak) and Marais Erasmus (SA); Player of the match: Suresh Raina (CSK)
17:30 (D/N); Scorecard	Suresh Raina 94* (48); Vinay Kumar 2/28 (4 Overs)		Manish Pandey 52 (44); Doug Bollinger 3/27 (3 Overs)	Sahara Stadium Kingsmead, Durban; Umpires: Asad Rauf (Pak) and Marais Erasmus (SA); Player of the match: Suresh Raina (CSK)
Chennai Super Kings won the toss and elected to bat.; Rain reduced the match to 17 overs per side				Sahara Stadium Kingsmead, Durban; Umpires: Asad Rauf (Pak) and Marais Erasmus (SA); Player of the match: Suresh Raina (CSK)

25 September	Warriors; 175/6 (20 overs)	v	Southern Redbacks; 145/7 (20 overs)	Warriors won by 30 runs
17:30 (D/N); Scorecard	Warriors; 175/6 (20 overs)	v	Southern Redbacks; 145/7 (20 overs)	SuperSport Park, Centurion; Umpires: Asoka de Silva (SL) and Rod Tucker (Aus); Player of the match: Davey Jacobs (WAR)
17:30 (D/N); Scorecard	Davey Jacobs 61 (41); Daniel Harris 3/18 (4 Overs)		Callum Ferguson 71 (49); Lonwabo Tsotsobe 2/16 (4 Overs)	SuperSport Park, Centurion; Umpires: Asoka de Silva (SL) and Rod Tucker (Aus); Player of the match: Davey Jacobs (WAR)
Warriors won the toss and elected to bat.				SuperSport Park, Centurion; Umpires: Asoka de Silva (SL) and Rod Tucker (Aus); Player of the match: Davey Jacobs (WAR)

Final

26 September	Warriors; 128/6 (20 overs)	v	Chennai Super Kings; 132/2 (19 overs)	Chennai Super Kings won by 8 wickets
17:30 (D/N); Scorecard	Warriors; 128/6 (20 overs)	v	Chennai Super Kings; 132/2 (19 overs)	New Wanderers Stadium, Johannesburg; Attendance: 30,122; Umpires: Aleem Dar (Pak) and Rudi Koertzen (SA); Player of the match: Murali Vijay (CSK)
17:30 (D/N); Scorecard	Davey Jacobs 34 (21); Muttiah Muralitharan 3/16 (4 overs)		Murali Vijay 58 (53); Nicky Boje 1/29 (4 overs)	New Wanderers Stadium, Johannesburg; Attendance: 30,122; Umpires: Aleem Dar (Pak) and Rudi Koertzen (SA); Player of the match: Murali Vijay (CSK)
Warriors won the toss and elected to bat.				New Wanderers Stadium, Johannesburg; Attendance: 30,122; Umpires: Aleem Dar (Pak) and Rudi Koertzen (SA); Player of the match: Murali Vijay (CSK)

== Statistics ==
=== Most runs ===
Player	Team	Runs	Best score
Murali Vijay	Chennai Super Kings	294	73
Davy Jacobs	Warriors	286	74
Michael Klinger	Southern Redbacks	226	78
Suresh Raina	Chennai Super Kings	203	94*

Source: "Champions League T20 2010/11 Statistics". Cricbuzz.

=== Most wickets ===
Player	Team	Wickets	Best bowling
Ravichandran Ashwin	Chennai Super Kings	13	4/18
Muttiah Muralitharan	Chennai Super Kings	12	3/16
Doug Bollinger	Chennai Super Kings	9	3/27
Daniel Christian	Southern Redbacks	9	4/23

Source: "Champions League T20 2010/11 Statistics". Cricbuzz.
