= Deccan Chargers =

Defunct Hyderabad-based cricket franchise in the Indian Premier League (2008–2012)

Personnel
- Owner: Deccan Chronicle

Team information
- City: Hyderabad, Andhra Pradesh, India
- Founded: 2008; 18 years ago
- Dissolved: 2012; 14 years ago (Replaced by Sunrisers Hyderabad)
- Home ground: Rajiv Gandhi International Stadium, Hyderabad

History
- IPL wins: 1 (2009)

Deccan Chargers (also sometimes known as the Hyderabad Deccan Chargers or simply Chargers) was a cricket franchise that competed in the Indian Premier League. It was based in the city of Hyderabad. The franchise was one of the eight inaugural members of the IPL in 2008 and winner of 2009. It was owned by Deccan Chronicle Holdings Ltd. After finishing at the bottom of the points table in the first season, they won the second season held in South Africa in 2009 under the captaincy of former Australian wicket-keeper-batsman Adam Gilchrist. Gilchrist was the captain of the team for the first three seasons of the IPL with Rohit Sharma as his deputy. From the fourth season, Kumar Sangakkara led the team and Cameron White played as his deputy. The team was coached by former Australian cricketer Darren Lehmann.

The owners put the franchise up for sale in 2012 due to constant banning of team players in previous seasons, but declined the sole bid. On 14 September 2012, the IPL governing council terminated the franchise for breaching contract terms. Subsequently, the Sun TV Network won the bid for the Hyderabad franchise, the BCCI confirmed on 25 October 2012. The new team was named as Sunrisers Hyderabad.

In July 2020, a Bombay High Court-appointed arbitration tribunal ruled that the termination of Deccan Chargers by BCCI was illegal. Deccan Chronicle Holding Ltd was awarded a compensation of ₹4814.67 crore plus 10% interest from 2012 by the BCCI.

== Franchise history ==
The Hyderabad franchise was bought by Deccan Chronicle Holdings Ltd. The media group acquired the franchise for US$107 million on 24 January 2008. The Chargers logo is a charging bull. From the 2009 season, the team changed the colour of the jersey (from beige and black to sparkling silver and blue) and the logo (from gold and red to white and blue). There was no Icon Player for the team as the former captain V.V.S. Laxman rejected the offer to be an icon player in order to free funds and enable the franchise to buy and encourage younger players.

The Deccan Chargers were a franchise cricket team based in Hyderabad, India. The team was created in 2008 by the Deccan Chronicle group and played in the Indian Premier League (IPL) until 2013.

The idea of starting a cricket team under the banner of Deccan Chronicle was first discussed on 11 November 2008 at a meeting with BCCI officials by K. K. Tiwari, editor-in-chief of the newspaper and its owner T.Venkat Ram Reddy. It was decided that the team would be based in Hyderabad and have an affiliation with CSK for their training facilities. The decision to name it "Deccan Chargers" came from two sources: one being T.Venkat Ram Reddy's desire to give back to society after his success as an entrepreneur; and second, his love for horses which is reflected in his horse racing business called "Deccan Horse Racing".

=== Franchise termination ===
Due to financial problems Deccan Chronicle Holdings Ltd, the team owner of Deccan Chargers announced a sale of their team by auction. The sale, announced in a newspaper advertisement on Thursday, was to be through a bidding process that was to be completed on 13 September, with the winning bid to be announced on the same day. However the auction for the franchise on 13 September 2012 ended with no results as the team's owners rejecting the sole bid they received from PVP Ventures. It was reported that Deccan Chargers owner rejected the bid by PVP ventures as DCHL's bankers were not happy with PVP's plan to divide the bid amount in two parts over the next ten years. Later on 14 September 2012, the BCCI announced that the Deccan Chargers IPL franchise was terminated due to BCCI codes by DCHL and the tender will be called for new team. DCHL moved to court to sort their issues with BCCI on termination.

== Indian Premier League ==
=== 2008 season ===
==== Players ====
The franchise initially acquired star players Adam Gilchrist, Andrew Symonds, Shahid Afridi, Scott Styris and Herschelle Gibbs. The main bowlers purchased by the franchise were R.P. Singh, Nuwan Zoysa and Chaminda Vaas. The other Indian players are Rohit Sharma, Venugopal Rao, and Pragyan Ojha.

==== Performance ====
Despite the fact that the team was one of the favorites to win the inaugural edition of the IPL, the team finished last. Andrew Symonds, who was Deccan's most expensive player, batted only 3 innings before leaving to play for the Australian national team. In addition, the team captain V.V.S. Laxman had an injury which ended his season after 6 games. Only three bowlers R. P. Singh, Pragyan Ojha and Shahid Afridi took more than 4 wickets in the competition. In this 14 match period, the team went on a losing streak at home and only managed 2 wins overall, one against the Mumbai Indians and one against the Chennai Super Kings and as a result they finished at the bottom of the table.

=== 2009 season ===
==== New administration and support staff ====
After the debacle of 2008, the team management sacked the entire administration associated with the tournament in that year. They removed their CEO J. Kalyan Krishnan, Coach Robin Singh and the Captain V.V.S. Laxman and replaced them with Tim Wright, the former Australian batsman Darren Lehmann and former Australian Wicket-keeper Adam Gilchrist respectively. Many new players were taken from domestic circuit and also few new international players were signed. The 2008 sponsor Jaypee Group withdrew its sponsorship due to the 2008 debacle. After this, the Deccan Chargers went through a complete makeover, including changing the colours of the team from pale brown to vibrant blue and a new logo displaying a more vibrant charging bull with Deccan Chronicle as the primary sponsor for the team. Among the other members of the support staff, their physio Sean Slattery and performance analyst Unni Krishnan were retained and were part of the team to win the IPL second edition in 2009 which was held in South Africa.

==== Tradings ====
In low key trading of players, the Deccan Chargers management had placed Shahid Afridi and Herschelle Gibbs up for sale, a direct result of their below par performance during the 2008 season. However, no franchise owners were interested in purchasing these two players. Later, the Deccan Chargers management severed all ties with Shahid Afridi, due to his disagreement with former team captain V.V.S. Laxman. Also, former Indian all-rounder Sanjay Bangar was transferred to the Kolkata Knight Riders.

==== New signings ====
Before the second player auction took place the management signed Queensland all-rounder Ryan Harris owing to a strong recommendation from coach Darren Lehmann. In the resulting auction the Deccan Chargers franchise acquired two West Indian players, Fidel Edwards for a fee of $150,000, and Dwayne Smith for $100,000. Seven new domestic players were also signed up including batsmen Tirumalasetti Suman and Abhinav Kumar, and bowler Shoaib Maqsusi from the Hyderabad team after their consistent performances on the domestic circuit. Baroda batsman Azhar Bilakhia and two fast bowlers from Punjab, Jaskarandeep Singh and Harmeet Singh were also signed on.

==== Performance ====
With the below-par performance in the inaugural season and finishing at the bottom, Deccan staged an inspired comeback in 2009 by winning the second IPL season. After having an undefeated run in the initial league stage, the team suffered minor setbacks by losing some close matches. But the return of Andrew Symonds, Rohit Sharma regaining form and the continuing exuberance of captain Adam Gilchrist bolstered the team. Some luck came in Charger's way towards the end of the league stage, with Kings XI Punjab and Rajasthan Royals losing key matches, enabling the Chargers into the semi-finals. During the semi-finals against the Delhi Daredevils, who were at the top of the table, few gave the Chargers a chance of an outside win. But against the odds, Gilchrist scored a sensational 85 off just 35 balls to put the Daredevils out of the competition and give the Chargers their first IPL final against the Royal Challengers Bangalore.

In the final match, Gilchrist got out for a duck in the first over; however, the Chargers managed to recover and posted a total of 143 for the loss of 6 wickets. Many felt that a good defending total could have been a further 20–30 runs. The Chargers came out with all guns blazing right from the first ball, and this spirited effort ensured that they successfully defended the total, winning the game by 6 runs and lifting the prized IPL trophy.

=== 2010 season ===
On 11 August 2009, Dinesh Wadhwa, former Regional Manager of ICICI Bank was appointed chief operating officer for 2010.

==== New signing ====
===== Foreign inclusions =====
- Kemar Roach, Mitchell Marsh

===== Domestic inclusions =====
- Anirudh Singh, Mohnish Mishra, Ashish Reddy, Bodapati Sumanth, Rahul Sharma

===== Contracts bought out =====
- Chamara Silva, Nuwan Zoysa

==== Performance ====
After winning 2009, there were high expectations on Chargers. Team opened with a loss in their inaugural match against KKR but subsequently won next three matches. But thereafter Chargers went on to lose the next five matches. With a situation where many doubted whether Chargers will be able to make to next round but they did it by winning next five consecutive matches and qualifying for playoffs. But Chargers lost both games in play-offs i.e. Semifinals and third place. Pragyan Ojha won the Purple Cap by becoming the highest wicket taker for them in the same season.

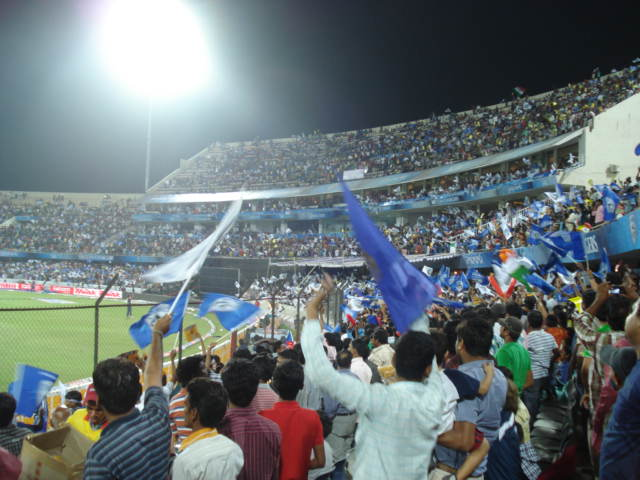
Deccan Chargers home crowd in 2011

=== 2011 season ===
Before the start of auction Chargers decided not to retain any players and have put all the players in auction. The much awaited Auction on 8 and 9 January 2011 lived up to the expectation; in fact it exceeded in many ways. Daniel Christian was termed as million dollar baby as he was hardly known to the world cricket at that point of time. Chargers also picked up Cameron White, JP Duminy, Ishant Sharma, Dale Steyn and skipper Kumar Sangakkara, but at lost R. P. Singh, Rohit Sharma, and Andrew Symonds and Gilchrist.

==== New signings ====
===== Foreign inclusions =====
- Kumar Sangakkara, Cameron White, Dale Steyn, Michael Lumb, Daniel Christian, Rusty Theron, JP Duminy, Chris Lynn

===== Indian players inclusions =====
- Capped Players: Shikhar Dhawan, Ishant Sharma, Harmeet Singh, Pragyan Ojha, Amit Mishra, Manpreet Gony
- Uncapped Players: Bharat Chipli, Ishan Malhotra, Ishank Jaggi, Sunny Sohal, Jaydev Shah, Prem Vardhan, Anand Rajan, Kedar Devdhar, Dwaraka Ravi Teja, Arjun Yadav, Ashish Reddy and Akash Bhandari.

==== Performance ====
Team started the campaign by losing first 2 games but team won next match. There after team started losing badly despite winning some games and was therefore eliminated from the competition. But team bounced back by showing pride by winning final 3 matches which did not allow a chance for other teams for qualifiers. Team disappointing performance was clearly due to inexperience in the squad especially due to lack of Indian international batsmen. Fans of DC have criticized management for not holding back Rohit Sharma during player retention. Chargers got to play IPL matches at Hyderabad after almost 3 years, but dismal performance at their home ground continued with a win against RCB being the only exception. However, in the away matches, Chargers did manage to beat Delhi Daredevils, Mumbai Indians, Knight Riders, Pune Warriors and Kings XI Punjab. They ended on a high with 3 consecutive wins but could not scale above 7th position in the league standings.

=== 2012 season ===
In 2012 Indian Premier League, Chargers named new fielding coach Trevor Penney replacing Mike Young.

==== New signings and tradings ====
In the trading window which opened in December, Chargers traded off Kevin Pietersen, Harmeet Singh and Pragyan Ojha to Delhi Daredevils, Kings XI Punjab, Mumbai Indians respectively. During player auctions, Chargers had tried to bid Ravindra Jadeja for entire $2m but eventually lost to the Super Kings in tie breaker. Later they acquired following players-

==== Players acquired ====
Daniel Harris ($70,000), Darren Bravo ($100,000), Parthiv Patel ($650,000)

After the auction, they signed up a few uncapped players such as TP Sudhindra, Tanmay Srivastava, Biplab Samantray, Akshath Reddy and Ashish Reddy owing to their strong domestic performances.

==== Contracts bought out ====
Michael Lumb, Jaydev Shah, Ishan Malhotra

==== Performance ====
The Chargers failed to deliver on a consistent basis in 2012 with narrow and consecutive defeats. Shikhar Dhawan, Dale Steyn and Cameron White were the only players who helped the team put up a fight. Team weakness was the bowling and fielding department, with fast bowler Ishant Sharma being ruled out due to injury and spinner Pragyan Ojha traded to Mumbai Indians. Deccan finished eighth out of the nine teams in the league stage points table, after languishing at the bottom for most part of the season. Deccan Chargers came into the season being characterized as 'underdogs', and they are yet to lose that name.

== Champions League T20 ==
The Twenty20 Champions League was an international Twenty20 cricket competition between clubs from India, Australia, England, South Africa, Sri Lanka, New Zealand and West Indies. The competition was launched in 2008 as a response to the success of national Twenty20 domestic cricket leagues, most notably the Indian Premier League.

=== 2009 season ===
On account of emerging as the winners of the 2009 season of the Indian Premier League, the team participated in the inaugural edition of the T20 Champions League, along with two other Indian teams: the runners-up of IPL 2009, Royal Challengers Bangalore, and Delhi Daredevils, the toppers of the league-stage points table.

They were knocked out in the group stages after losing to the Somerset Sabres and Trinidad and Tobago, who they were drawn against in Group A.

== Honours ==
=== Indian Premier League ===
Year	League standing	Final standing
2008	8th out of 8	Group stage
2009	4th out of 8	Champions
2010	2nd out of 8	Semi-finals
2011	7th out of 10	Group stage
2012	8th out of 9	Group stage

=== Champions League Twenty20 ===
Year	Final standing
2008	Cancelled
2009	Group stage
2010	DNQ
2011	DNQ
2012	DNQ

- DNQ = Did not qualify

== Team sponsors ==
Year	Kit manufacturers	Shirt sponsor (front)	Shirt sponsor (back)
2008–2009	Nike	Jaypee Group	
2009–2010	Puma	Deccan Chronicle	Odyssey
2010–2011	Puma	Idea	Deccan Chronicle
2011–2012	Puma	UltraTech Cement	Deccan Chronicle
2012–2013	Puma	Fly Emirates	Jaypee Cement

== Results ==
=== Overall results ===
Summary of results
Season	Played	Wins	Losses	Tied	Win %	Position
IPL
2008	14	2	12	0	14%	8/8
2009	16	9	7	0	56%	1/8
2010	16	8	8	0	50%	4/8
2011	14	6	8	0	42%	7/10
2012	15	4	11	0	26.67%	8/9
Total	75	29	46	0	38.67%	
Champions League T20
2009	2	0	2	0	0%	10/12
Total	2	0	2	0	0%	
Overall
Overall	77	29	48	0	37.67%	

=== Results summary by opposition ===
Opposition	Span	Mat	Won	Lost	Tied	NR	%
IPL
Chennai Super Kings	2008–2012	10	4	6	0	0	40.00
Delhi Capitals	2008–2012	11	4	7	0	0	36.36
Kings XI Punjab	2008–2012	10	3	7	0	0	30.00
Kolkata Knight Riders	2008–2012	10	2	7	0	1	22.57
Mumbai Indians	2008–2012	10	4	6	0	0	40.00
Rajasthan Royals	2008–2012	9	2	7	0	0	22.22
Royal Challengers Bangalore	2008–2012	11	6	5	0	0	54.54
Kochi Tuskers Kerala	2011	1	1	0	0	0	100.00
Pune Warriors India	2011–2012	4	3	1	0	0	75.00
Total	2008–2012	76	29	46	0	1	38.66%
Champions League T20
Trinidad and Tobago	2009	1	0	1	0	0	0.00
Somerset Sabres	2009	1	0	1	0	0	0.00

== See also ==
- Sunrisers Hyderabad
