= 2013 Indian Premier League final =

- Event: 2013 Indian Premier League
| Mumbai Indians | Chennai Super Kings |
| 148/9 | 125/9 |
| 20 overs | 20 overs |
- Mumbai Indians won by 23 runs
- Date: 26 May 2013
- Venue: Eden Gardens, Kolkata
- Player of the match: Kieron Pollard (MI)
- Umpires: Kumar Dharmasena (SL); Simon Taufel (Aus)
- Attendance: 61,619

The 2013 Indian Premier League final was a day/night Twenty20 cricket match played between the Chennai Super Kings and the Mumbai Indians on 26 May 2013 at Eden Gardens, Kolkata to determine the winners of the 2013 Indian Premier League, the sixth annual season of the professional Twenty20 cricket tournament in India. Mumbai defeated Chennai by 23 runs, attributed to Kieron Pollard's unbeaten innings of 60 runs from 32 balls which earned him the man of the match award.

Mumbai won their first IPL title playing in their second IPL Final, after losing to Chennai in 2010. Chennai were playing their fifth IPL Final, attempting to win their third title. It was also the final match where Mumbai's Sachin Tendulkar was an IPL cricketer, although he did not participate in the match due to injury. He announced his retirement from the IPL at the conclusion of the match.

== Road to the final ==
Heading into the tournament, as with the previous seasons, both the Chennai Super Kings and Mumbai Indians were considered to be amongst the favourites due to their past performances and squads. Chennai were the runners-up of 2012 and twice IPL champions before. Mumbai had made playoff-stage appearances in each of the past three years and were runners-up in 2010 when they lost to Chennai.

=== Group stage ===
Chennai and Mumbai were dominant throughout the group stage. At the end of the group stage, they were ranked first and second respectively and each had 11 wins from 16 matches. Apart from losing their first match, which was against Mumbai, and an upset against Pune Warriors India, Chennai started their season strong with consistent batting from Michael Hussey and Suresh Raina. Captain Mahendra Singh Dhoni and Ravindra Jadeja formed a strong middle order as they scored quickly late in their innings to help Chennai while chasing. Chennai's bowling attack continued to be considered their one weakness. While the inclusion of Dirk Nannes and Chris Morris, both purchased at this year's auction, produced a few successes, the best bowling performances came from Dwayne Bravo and Mohit Sharma. Sharma, an uncapped Indian player playing in his debut IPL season, took the most wickets in powerplays in the first half of the season. For most of the season's second half, Chennai held the top position on the points table with an IPL record-equalling seven-match winning streak. Hussey and Raina continued their prolific run-scoring. Hussey was frequently the season's highest run-scorer while Raina made his maiden IPL century and another score of 99. They, however, finished the group stage with three losses from five matches, including another against Mumbai.

Mumbai began the season with the new opening batting partnership of Sachin Tendulkar and Ricky Ponting, who was acquired in the auction and took on the captaincy. This partnership failed to produce runs and Ponting was benched after five matches. Instead, Mumbai's batting solely depended on Dinesh Karthik, Rohit Sharma and Kieron Pollard and they could only win three of their first six matches. Mumbai were at the middle of the points table halfway through the season. As the tournament progressed, they had a more consistent top order with Dwayne Smith replacing Ponting and an improved bowling attack that included Mitchell Johnson, in his first IPL season, Harbhajan Singh, Lasith Malinga and Pragyan Ojha. Sharma, who took over the captaincy from Ponting, continued his form while Karthik began to struggle. Pollard only made one more significant contribution when he scored 66 runs from 27 balls. Towards the end of the group stage, Tendulkar suffered a wrist injury. This did not hamper the team as his replacement, Aditya Tare, showed promise with a score of 59 runs in his first innings. Mumbai only lost two of their last ten matches, both due to batting collapses.

Group stage progression
| Team | Group matches | | | | | | | | | | | | | | | | Playoffs | | |
| Team | 1 | 2 | 3 | 4 | 5 | 6 | 7 | 8 | 9 | 10 | 11 | 12 | 13 | 14 | 15 | 16 | Q1/E | Q2 | F |
|---|---|---|---|---|---|---|---|---|---|---|---|---|---|---|---|---|---|---|---|
| Chennai Super Kings | 0 | 2 | 4 | 4 | 6 | 8 | 10 | 12 | 14 | 16 | 18 | 18 | 20 | 20 | 22 | 22 | W | | L |
| Mumbai Indians | 0 | 2 | 4 | 6 | 6 | 6 | 8 | 10 | 12 | 12 | 14 | 16 | 18 | 20 | 22 | 22 | L | W | W |

| Win | Loss | No result |

- Note: The total points at the end of each group match are listed.
- Note: Click on the points (group matches) or W/L (playoffs) to see the match summary.

==== Group stage series ====
6 April (D/N)
Match 5
Scorecard

| Mumbai Indians; 148/6 (20 overs) | v | Chennai Super Kings (H); 139/9 (20 overs) |

Mumbai won by 9 runs
M. A. Chidambaram Stadium, Chepauk, Chennai

5 May (D/N)
Match 49
Scorecard

| (H) Mumbai Indians; 139/5 (20 overs) | v | Chennai Super Kings; 79 (15.2 overs) |

Mumbai won by 60 runs
Wankhede Stadium, Mumbai

In the two group stage matches between Mumbai and Chennai, Mumbai won both. In the first, Mumbai initially struggled and were 83 for 6 after 12 overs before Pollard's unbeaten innings of 57 runs from 38 balls lifted them to a total of 148 for 6. Chennai suffered a similar collapse to lose the match by 9 runs despite a valiant innings of 51 runs from Dhoni. In their second encounter, Mumbai struggled to a below-par total of 139 for 5 with Sharma having the top score of 39. Chennai was then bowled out for 79, the lowest total of the season, and lost by 60 runs. Only three of their batsmen made scores of double figures, including Hussey who was dropped by Pollard in three successive deliveries off Johnson's bowling. Dhoni described the match as "a comedy of errors" and explained the cause of the defeat to be complacency and a lack of focus as they had won their past seven matches.

=== Playoff stage ===
The playoff stage is played according to the Page playoff system and provided Mumbai and Chennai, being the top- and second-ranked teams, with two ways of qualifying for the Final. They first faced each other in Qualifier 1 where the winners would qualify for the Final. The losers of Qualifier 1 would play against the winners of the Eliminator in Qualifier 2, the winners of which would also qualify for the Final.

21 May (D/N)
Qualifier 1
Scorecard

| Chennai Super Kings; 192/1 (20 overs) | v | Mumbai Indians; 144 (18.4 overs) |

Chennai won by 48 runs
Feroz Shah Kotla, Delhi

In Qualifier 1, Chennai chose to bat first. Both captains wished to bat first and believed the flat pitch and quick outfield would favour batsmen and produce a high-scoring match. Chennai's innings began steady before a 140-run partnership between Raina and Hussey boosted their total to 192 for 1. They scored 123 runs from the last 10 overs against Mumbai's formidable bowling attack. Malinga and Johnson, two of Mumbai's key bowlers, conceded 45 and 40 runs each without taking a wicket. Harbhajan, with figures of 0 for 26, was the only bowler to concede less than 9 runs an over. The chase started promisingly as Smith propelled them to 86 for 1 after 8 overs. Jadeja was then introduced into the attack and took the wickets of Smith, Karthik and Pollard. Mumbai did not recover as Bravo helped remove the remaining batsmen, finishing with figures of 3 for 9. Mumbai was bowled out in 18.4 overs and lost the match by 48 runs.

24 May (D/N)
Qualifier 2
Scorecard

| Rajasthan Royals; 165/6 (20 overs) | v | Mumbai Indians; 169/6 (19.5 overs) |

Mumbai won by 4 wickets
Eden Gardens, Kolkata

Qualifier 2 was between Mumbai and the Rajasthan Royals. Rain delayed the game by an hour but it remained a full-length match. Rajasthan captain Rahul Dravid won the toss and elected to bat. Both captains wanted to bat, stating it appeared to be a good pitch to bat on. Dravid and Ajinkya Rahane provided a solid but slow start to reach 42 without loss after 6 overs. Harbhajan then entered the attack and took the wickets of Rahane and Shane Watson, Royals' top scorer of the season, in his first two overs. Apart from Dravid, who also fell to Harbhajan for 43 runs, only Stuart Binny and Dishant Yagnik made good scores. Yagnik's quick scoring helped Rajasthan get 46 runs from the last 3 overs and finish with 165 for 5. Mumbai were confident in their chase as Smith helped them reach 125 for 1 after 14 overs. Wickets were then lost at regular intervals but the required rate remained manageable and Mumbai won by 4 wickets with one ball remaining. Smith was again the top scorer for Mumbai with 62 runs.

== Team history ==
Both the Chennai Super Kings and the Mumbai Indians were a part of the original eight teams of the Indian Premier League when its first season was held in 2008. From the first season, Chennai had been a formidable, well-balanced team with a strong lineup of Indian players, including the captain of India Mahendra Singh Dhoni. Dhoni was bought for US$1.5 million, the highest of the 2008 auction, and appointed their captain. They immediately became runners-up in 2008 and had continued to appear in every knockout/playoff stage since. They were the most successful IPL team, being twice champions and twice runners-up in the IPL and also the winners of the 2010 Champions League Twenty20. Apart from Dhoni, their most recognised player is Suresh Raina, who has played in every one of Chennai's matches and holds the record for most career runs in the IPL. Chennai's squad is batting oriented, largely consisting of specialist batsmen and all-rounders in favour of specialist bowlers.

In contrast, Mumbai struggled in their first two seasons and failed to make the knockout stage in both. The team began with the notoriety of being the most expensive team in the league and the team with cricket legend Sachin Tendulkar. The team was bought for $111.9 million by Reliance Industries, one of India's largest private sector enterprises. In 2010, the team began to shed its problems of inconsistency and unsettled squad composition. The team perpetuated their reputation of being big spenders as they signed Kieron Pollard at the 2010 auction for an undisclosed amount after reaching the maximum open-auction bid of $750,000. Mumbai reached the Final that year, where they lost to Chennai. They then made the playoff stage every year since with the staple of their squad comprising Tendulkar, Pollard, Lasith Malinga and Rohit Sharma, who was acquired in 2011. Pollard and Malinga are amongst the most sought out players of the format for their big-hitting and death-over bowling respectively. Despite their lineup, they had yet to become IPL champions but did win the 2011 Champions League Twenty20.

== Match ==
=== Background ===
The Final was at the neutral venue of Eden Gardens, Kolkata and saw Chennai and Mumbai face each other for the fourth time this season in a rematch of the 2010 Final, won by Chennai. In 14 previous encounters between the two teams, Mumbai had won 8 and Chennai had won 6. In knockout/playoff stage matches, the record was 3–0 in favour of Chennai. In all three matches, Chennai batted first and restricted Mumbai to totals in the 140s. While both had the same win–loss record in the group stage this season, Mumbai's record was attributed to their undefeated record at their home ground. Chennai had the best record playing away from home in this season's group stage, winning 5 of 8 matches. Chennai had the tournament's highest run-scorer in Michael Hussey and joint-top wicket-taker in Dwayne Bravo.

The final weeks of the tournament were shrouded by controversies involving corruption. It began with the arrest of three players from the Rajasthan Royals by the Delhi Police on allegations of spot fixing. Two days before the Final, Gurunath Meiyappan, a top official of the Chennai Super Kings, was arrested by Mumbai Police on charges of cheating, forgery and fraud. His arrest also implicated N. Srinivasan, the president of the Board of Control for Cricket in India and Meiyappan's father-in-law.

=== Report ===
The toss was won by Mumbai. Their captain Rohit Sharma described the pitch as being drier than the previous match and predicted it would slow down as the match progressed. Chennai captain Mahendra Singh Dhoni also wanted to bat first as it would have put pressure on the team chasing. Both squads were unchanged from their respective previous matches.

Mumbai's innings began poorly as Mohit Sharma and Albie Morkel troubled their batsmen with straight deliveries. Both opening batsmen, Dwayne Smith and Aditya Tare, and Rohit Sharma lost their wickets within the first four overs for 16 runs. Dinesh Karthik and Ambati Rayudu attempted to build a partnership but also struggled and Karthik was dismissed after they added 36 runs. In came Kieron Pollard in the tenth over and immediately played aggressively. Pollard and Rayudu were able to score more freely against Ravichandran Ashwin and Ravindra Jadeja to lift Mumbai to 100 for 4 after 15 overs. The following delivery, Rayudu fell to Dwayne Bravo for 37 runs and Mumbai was left with only Pollard and their bowlers. Harbhajan Singh briefly provided support for Pollard with boundaries coming from the edges of his bat before he fell to Bravo off a mishit. The remaining batsmen only made minimal contributions and most were dismissed by Bravo, who finished with figures of 4 for 42. Despite Pollard getting his third half-century of the season, Mumbai could only achieve a total of 148 for 9.

Michael Hussey and Murali Vijay opened in the chase. In the first over, Lasith Malinga took the wickets of Hussey and Suresh Raina in two successive deliveries. Subramaniam Badrinath was dismissed in the following over and Chennai's score was 3 for 3. Vijay and Bravo attempted to target Pragyan Ojha and Rishi Dhawan but wickets continued to fall due to poor shot selection and Chennai was reduced to 39 for 6 in the eighth over. This forced Dhoni to bat earlier than his preference of late in the innings. Dhoni attempted to rescue the innings but wickets continued to fall around him. Chennai's innings finally improved in the ninth-wicket partnership between Dhoni and Ashwin, during which Dhoni hit three boundary sixes off the bowling of Ojha and Pollard. The asking rate slowly became unmanagable and Ashwin was dismissed in the 18th over. Dhoni finished with an unbeaten 63 runs and Chennai lost by 23 runs.

=== Summary ===
In a match that resembled their first group stage encounter, Mumbai defeated Chennai by 23 runs. The top run-scorers of the season for both teams failed to make high scores while Rayudu and Malinga produced one of their best performances of the season. These performances, along with Pollard's 60 runs, helped Mumbai better Chennai's lone resistance from Dhoni. Pollard's good innings had only come sporadically before and his contribution earned him the man of the match.

It was Mumbai's first IPL title and Chennai's second consecutive time as runners-up. It was the second IPL title for Rohit Sharma and Ojha, who were with the Deccan Chargers when they won the 2009 Final. Bravo's four wickets made him the top wicket-taker of the season with 32 wickets, unprecedented for an IPL season. Hussey remained the top run-scorer of the season with 733 runs. They were awarded the Purple Cap and Orange Cap awards respectively.

== Scorecard ==
- On-field umpires: Kumar Dharmasena (SL) and Simon Taufel (Aus)
- TV umpire: Chettithody Shamsuddin (Ind)
- Reserve umpire: Krishnaraj Srinath (Ind)
- Match referee: Ranjan Madugalle (SL)

Toss: Mumbai Indians won the toss and elected to bat.

Mumbai Indians innings
| Player | Status | Runs | Balls | 4s | 6s | Strike rate |
|---|---|---|---|---|---|---|
| Dwayne Smith | lbw b M Sharma | 4 | 4 | 1 | 0 | 100.00 |
| Aditya Tare | b Morkel | 0 | 1 | 0 | 0 | 0.00 |
| Dinesh Karthik^{†} | b Morris | 21 | 26 | 3 | 0 | 80.76 |
| Rohit Sharma* | c & b Morkel | 2 | 5 | 0 | 0 | 40.00 |
| Ambati Rayudu | b Bravo | 37 | 36 | 4 | 0 | 102.77 |
| Kieron Pollard | not out | 60 | 32 | 7 | 3 | 187.50 |
| Harbhajan Singh | c Hussey b Bravo | 14 | 8 | 3 | 0 | 175.00 |
| Rishi Dhawan | run out (M Sharma/Morris) | 3 | 3 | 0 | 0 | 100.00 |
| Mitchell Johnson | c ^{†}Dhoni b Bravo | 1 | 2 | 0 | 0 | 50.00 |
| Lasith Malinga | c ^{†}Dhoni b Bravo | 0 | 2 | 0 | 0 | 0.00 |
| Pragyan Ojha | not out | 1 | 1 | 0 | 0 | 100.00 |
| Extras | (lb 2, w 3) | 5 | | | | |
| Total | (9 wickets; 20 overs) | 148 | | | | |

Fall of wickets: 1–4 (Smith, 0.4 ov), 2–8 (Tare, 1.1 ov), 3–16 (R Sharma, 3.2 ov), 4–52 (Karthik, 9.3 ov), 5–100 (Rayudu, 15.1 ov), 6–125 (Harbhajan Singh, 17.5 ov), 7–133 (Dhawan, 18.4 ov), 8–135 (Johnson, 19.1 ov), 9–135 (Malinga, 19.3 ov)

Chennai Super Kings bowling
| Bowler | Overs | Maidens | Runs | Wickets | Econ | Wides | NBs |
|---|---|---|---|---|---|---|---|
| Mohit Sharma | 4 | 0 | 26 | 1 | 6.50 | 0 | 0 |
| Albie Morkel | 3 | 0 | 12 | 2 | 4.00 | 0 | 0 |
| Chris Morris | 4 | 0 | 25 | 1 | 6.25 | 1 | 0 |
| Ravichandran Ashwin | 3 | 0 | 22 | 0 | 7.33 | 1 | 0 |
| Ravindra Jadeja | 2 | 0 | 19 | 0 | 9.50 | 0 | 0 |
| Dwayne Bravo | 4 | 0 | 42 | 4 | 10.50 | 1 | 0 |

Chennai Super Kings innings
| Player | Status | Runs | Balls | 4s | 6s | Strike rate |
|---|---|---|---|---|---|---|
| Michael Hussey | b Malinga | 1 | 2 | 0 | 0 | 50.00 |
| Murali Vijay | c R Sharma b Johnson | 18 | 20 | 2 | 0 | 90.00 |
| Suresh Raina | c Smith b Malinga | 0 | 1 | 0 | 0 | 0.00 |
| Subramaniam Badrinath | c ^{†}Karthik b Johnson | 0 | 3 | 0 | 0 | 0.00 |
| Dwayne Bravo | c Johnson b Dhawan | 15 | 16 | 3 | 0 | 93.75 |
| Ravindra Jadeja | c Pollard b Harbhajan Singh | 0 | 2 | 0 | 0 | 0.00 |
| Mahendra Singh Dhoni*^{†} | not out | 63 | 45 | 3 | 5 | 140.00 |
| Albie Morkel | b Ojha | 10 | 10 | 0 | 1 | 100.00 |
| Chris Morris | c ^{†}Karthik b Harbhajan Singh | 0 | 1 | 0 | 0 | 0.00 |
| Ravichandran Ashwin | c sub (Akshar Patel) b Pollard | 9 | 18 | 0 | 0 | 50.00 |
| Mohit Sharma | not out | 0 | 2 | 0 | 0 | 0.00 |
| Extras | (lb 2, w 7) | 9 | | | | |
| Total | (9 wickets; 20 overs) | 125 | | | | |

Fall of wickets: 1–2 (Hussey, 0.4 ov), 2–2 (Raina, 0.5 ov), 3–3 (Badrinath, 1.4 ov), 4–35 (Bravo, 5.6 ov), 5–36 (Jadeja, 6.4 ov), 6–39 (Vijay, 7.3 ov), 7–57 (Morkel, 10.6 ov), 8–58 (Morris, 11.3 ov), 9–99 (Ashwin, 17.4 ov)

Mumbai Indians bowling
| Bowler | Overs | Maidens | Runs | Wickets | Econ | Wides | NBs |
|---|---|---|---|---|---|---|---|
| Lasith Malinga | 4 | 0 | 22 | 2 | 5.50 | 2 | 0 |
| Mitchell Johnson | 4 | 0 | 19 | 2 | 4.75 | 2 | 0 |
| Pragyan Ojha | 4 | 0 | 28 | 1 | 7.00 | 0 | 0 |
| Rishi Dhawan | 1 | 0 | 6 | 1 | 6.00 | 0 | 0 |
| Harbhajan Singh | 3 | 0 | 14 | 2 | 4.66 | 0 | 0 |
| Kieron Pollard | 4 | 0 | 34 | 1 | 8.50 | 3 | 0 |

== See also ==
- 2013 Champions League Twenty20
- Chennai Super Kings-Mumbai Indians rivalry
