= List of 2009 Indian Premier League personnel changes =

This is a list of all personnel changes for the 2009 Indian Premier League (IPL).

== Retirement ==
Date	Name	Team(s) played (years)	Age	Notes	Ref.
15 November 2008	Shaun Pollock	Mumbai Indians (2008)	35	Became the bowling coach for the Mumbai Indians.	
2008	Darren Lehmann	Rajasthan Royals (2008)	38	Became coach for the Deccan Chargers.	
2008	Stephen Fleming	Chennai Super Kings (2008)	35	Became coach for the Chennai Super Kings.	

== Trades ==
Teams were reluctant to trade initially due to the troubled economic times and the general desire to concentrate on building a well-rounded team as opposed to making profits out of trades.

17 January 2009	To Delhi Daredevils: Ashish Nehra	To Mumbai Indians: Shikhar Dhawan
22 January 2009	To Mumbai Indians: Zaheer Khan	To Royal Challengers Bangalore: Robin Uthappa
—	Three-team trade	
—	To Mumbai Indians: Jaydev Shah (from Rajasthan)	To Royal Challengers Bangalore: Gaurav Dhiman (from Mumbai); Pankaj Singh (from Rajasthan)

== Signings ==
=== Pre-auction signings ===
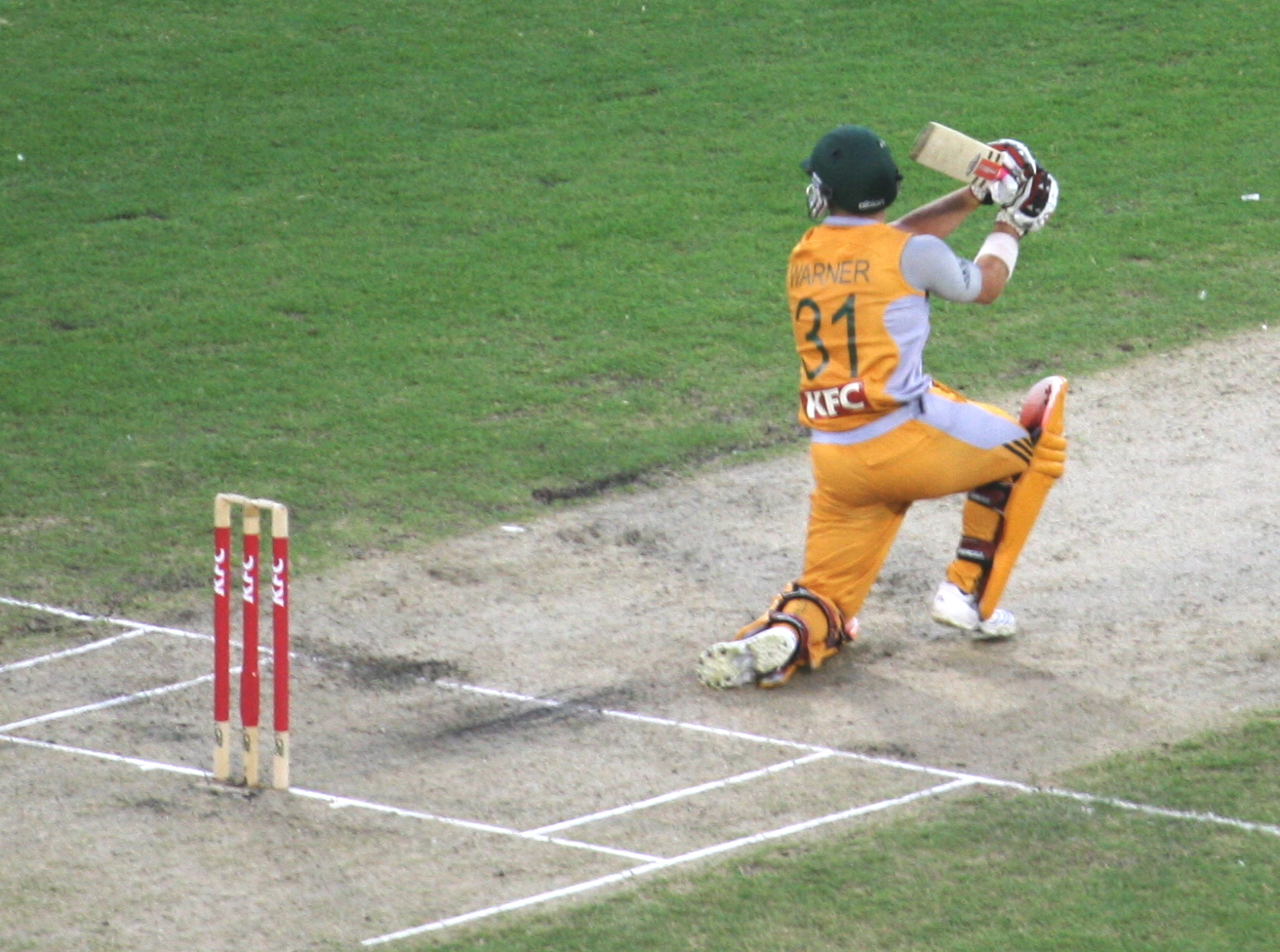
Delhi Daredevils scouts prompted management to sign David Warner early in the off-season

With most international players (barring members of the England squad and Indian Cricket League players) signing up for the first season on multi-season contracts, the emphasis for off-season signings for 2009 were possible up-and-coming young players from international domestic circuits. Some teams, including the Delhi Daredevils sent scouts to domestic and 'emerging player' matches held in Australia to sign up players.

Player	Team
Dirk Nannes	Delhi Daredevils
David Warner	Delhi Daredevils
Andrew McDonald	Delhi Daredevils
Ryan Harris	Deccan Chargers
Graham Napier	Mumbai Indians
Sachin Rana	Kolkata Knight Riders
Monish Parmar	Kolkata Knight Riders
Raiphi Gomez	Rajasthan Royals
Ryan McLaren	Mumbai Indians
Dillon du Preez	Royal Challengers Bangalore
Angelo Mathews	Kolkata Knight Riders
Moises Henriques	Kolkata Knight Riders

=== Post Auction Signings ===
Any 'unsold' players as well as players sought after as replacements for Pakistani players who would be unable to play for their IPL team in 2009 could be signed on after the auction.

Player	Team
Naman Ojha	Rajasthan Royals
Kamran Khan	Rajasthan Royals
Lee Carseldine	Rajasthan Royals
Shane Harwood	Rajasthan Royals
Robert Quiney	Rajasthan Royals
Burt Cockley	Kings XI Punjab

== Re-signings ==
IPL Replacement Players, filling in for players away on national duty, and some under-19 players, were recruited with a one-year contract and hence their franchises had the choice to resign them or release them as free agents.

Player	Team
Ajantha Mendis	Kolkata Knight Riders
Brad Hodge	Kolkata Knight Riders
Ravindra Jadeja	Rajasthan Royals
Dwayne Bravo	Mumbai Indians
Virat Kohli	Royal Challengers Bangalore

== Withdrawals ==
Other players opted to withdraw from this particular season from the IPL, but had not ruled out returning in the future. In most cases, the reason for withdrawal was that the players wanted a break from the hectic international schedule. There had also been withdrawals due to injury. Furthermore, Pakistani cricketers had their contracts terminated or suspended due to tensions between India and Pakistan since the 2008 Mumbai attacks. Most withdrawals were Australian international players, for whom the IPL would be the only break between a series against Pakistan and the upcoming long tour of England which would include The Ashes series. The withdrawals included:

Player	Team
Michael Hussey	Chennai Super Kings
Ricky Ponting	Kolkata Knight Riders
Moises Henriques	Kolkata Knight Riders
Sachin Rana	Kolkata Knight Riders
Monish Parmar	Kolkata Knight Riders
Angelo Matthews	Kolkata Knight Riders
Andrew McDonald	Delhi Daredevils
Ryan Harris	Deccan Chargers
Graham Napier	Mumbai Indians
Ryan McLaren	Mumbai Indians
Dillon du Preez	Royal Challengers Bangalore
Raiphi Gomez	Rajasthan Royals
Shaun Tait	Rajasthan Royals

== Auction ==
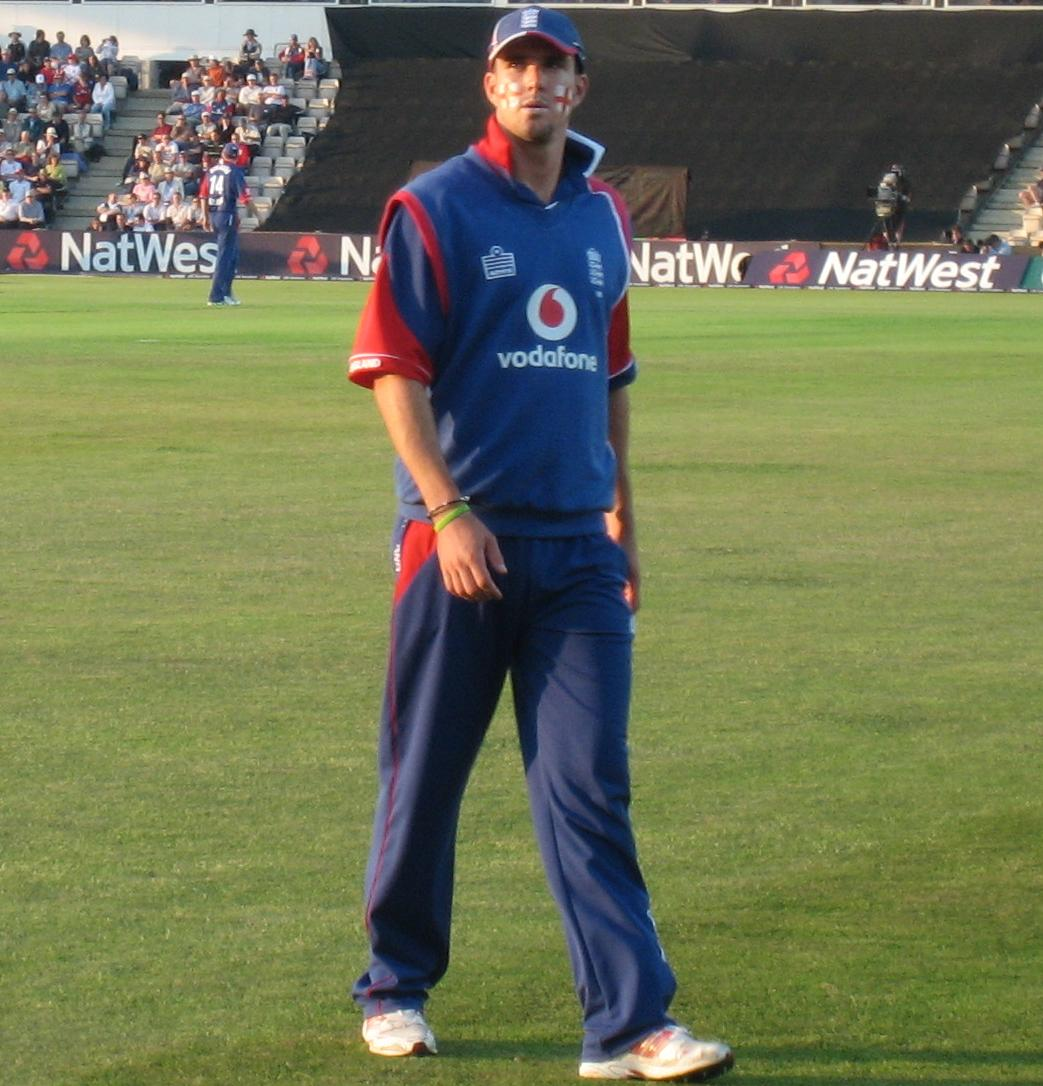
Kevin Pietersen was signed for a record US$1.55 million by Royal Challengers Bangalore and made captain of the team

The 2009 Indian Premier League Players Auction was held on 6 February 2009 in Goa, India. A total of 43 players from 9 countries were shortlisted for the auction. However, only 17 of them were sold. The English duo of Kevin Pietersen and Andrew Flintoff each went for US$1.55 million, which made them the highest-paid cricketers in the IPL.

=== Sold players ===
Player	Team	Winning bid	Base price
Shaun Tait	Rajasthan Royals	$375,000	$250,000
JP Duminy	Mumbai Indians	$950,000	$300,000
Andrew Flintoff	Chennai Super Kings	$1,550,000	$950,000
Kevin Pietersen	Royal Challengers Bangalore	$1,550,000	$1,350,000
Fidel Edwards	Deccan Chargers	$150,000	$150,000
Owais Shah	Delhi Daredevils	$275,000	$150,000
Paul Collingwood	Delhi Daredevils	$275,000	$250,000
Tyron Henderson	Rajasthan Royals	$650,000	$100,000
Ravi Bopara	Kings XI Punjab	$450,000	$150,000
Thilan Thushara	Chennai Super Kings	$140,000	$100,000
Jesse Ryder	Royal Challengers Bangalore	$160,000	$100,000
Kyle Mills	Mumbai Indians	$150,000	$150,000
Dwayne Smith	Deccan Chargers	$100,000	$100,000
Jerome Taylor	Kings XI Punjab	$150,000	$150,000
Mohammad Ashraful	Mumbai Indians	$75,000	$75,000
Mashrafe Mortaza	Kolkata Knight Riders	$600,000	$50,000
George Bailey	Chennai Super Kings	$50,000	$50,000
