= 2009 Indian Premier League =

Cricket tournament

- Dates: 18 April 2009 – 24 May 2009
- Administrator: Board of Control for Cricket in India
- Cricket format: Twenty20
- Tournament format(s): Double round-robin and knockout
- Host: South Africa
- Champions: Deccan Chargers (1st title)
- Runners-up: Royal Challengers Bangalore
- Participants: 8
- Matches: 59
- Player of the series: Adam Gilchrist (Deccan Chargers)
- Most runs: Matthew Hayden (CSK) (572)
- Most wickets: R. P. Singh (Deccan Chargers) (23)
- Official website: www.iplt20.com

The 2009 Indian Premier League season, abbreviated as IPL 2 or the 2009 IPL, was the second season of the Indian Premier League, established by the Board of Control for Cricket in India (BCCI) in 2007. The tournament was hosted by South Africa and was played between 18 April and 24 May 2009. It was the second biggest cricket tournament in the world, after the Cricket World Cup, and was forecast to have an estimated television audience of more than 200 million people in India alone.

As the second season of the IPL coincided with multi-phase 2009 Indian general elections, and in the aftermath of the 3 March 2009 attack on the Sri Lanka national cricket team in Lahore, Pakistan, the Government of India refused to commit security by Indian paramilitary forces. As a result, the BCCI decided to host the second season of the league outside India. On 24 March 2009, the BCCI officially announced that the second season of the IPL was to be held in South Africa. Though India did not host the second season, the format of the tournament remained unchanged from the 2008 season format. The season also marked the non-participation of Pakistani players, who were eventually excluded from subsequent seasons due to the geopolitical situations caused by the November 2008 terror attacks in Mumbai, which was committed by the Pakistan-based militant group Lashkar-e-Taiba.

The IPL injected approximately US$100 million into South Africa's local economy. In addition, the BCCI signed an ₹ 82 billion (US$1.63 billion) contract with Multi Screen Media to broadcast matches live from South Africa to India.

The IPL was hosted successfully in South Africa and was hailed as an "extraordinary" accomplishment. The tournament was particularly praised for globalizing cricket and had set record television viewership. The tournament was won by Deccan Chargers, who beat the Royal Challengers Bangalore in the final.

== Venues ==
Durban	Centurion	Johannesburg	Cape Town
Kingsmead; Capacity: 25,000; Matches: 16	SuperSport Park; Capacity: 20,000; Matches: 12 (Including Semifinal)	New Wanderers Stadium; Capacity: 34,000; Matches: 8 (Including Semifinal & Final)	Newlands; Capacity: 25,000; Matches: 8
2009 Indian Premier League is located in South Africa
Port Elizabeth	East London	Kimberley	Bloemfontein
St George's Park; Capacity: 19,000; Matches: 7	Buffalo Park; Capacity: 15,000; Matches: 3	De Beers Oval; Capacity: 11,000; Matches: 3	OUTsurance Oval; Capacity: 20,000; Matches: 2

== Rules and regulations ==
Some of the rules were changed for the 2009 edition of the IPL. The number of international players allowed in any one squad was increased from 8 to 10 although the number allowed in any playing 11 remained at 4. The IPL sanctioned franchises to spend a further US$2 million during the auction taking the total salary cap for each franchise to US$7 million for the 2009 tournament. The BCCI also negotiated with England Cricket Board (ECB) to allow English cricketers to participate in the tournament. English players were allowed to play for 21 days in between their tour to West Indies and the subsequent return tour.

At the halfway point of each innings, a seven-and-a-half-minute television timeout was now held. The change proved controversial, as critics and players felt that it broke the flow of the game, and because two-thirds of the break were devoted purely to additional advertising time. The timeout rules were revised for the 2010 season.

The format is the same as previous season. Points in the group stage were awarded as follows:

Points
Results	Points
Win	2 points
No result	1 point
Loss	0 points

If the match ends with the scores tied and there must be a winner, the tie is broken with a one over per side "Eliminator" or "Super Over":

1. Higher number of points
2. If equal, higher number of wins
3. If still equal, net run rate
4. If still equal, lower bowling strike rate
5. If still equal, result of head-to-head meeting.

== Teams and standings ==
=== Points table ===
Pos	Team	Pld	W	L	NR	Pts	NRR
1	Delhi Daredevils	14	10	4	0	20	0.311
2	Chennai Super Kings	14	8	5	1	17	0.951
3	Royal Challengers Bangalore (R)	14	8	6	0	16	−0.191
4	Deccan Chargers (C)	14	7	7	0	14	0.203
5	Kings XI Punjab	14	7	7	0	14	−0.483
6	Rajasthan Royals	14	6	7	1	13	−0.352
7	Mumbai Indians	14	5	8	1	11	0.297
8	Kolkata Knight Riders	14	3	10	1	7	−0.789

Source: Full table on ESPNcricinfo

(C) = Eventual champion; (R) = Runner-up.
Winner, runner-up and best-performing semi-finalist in the group stage qualify for the 2009 Champions League Twenty20.

=== Match summary ===
Vertical team →	CSK	DC	DD	KXIP	KKR	MI	RR	RCB
Horizontal team ↓	CSK	DC	DD	KXIP	KKR	MI	RR	RCB
Chennai Super Kings		Deccan; 6 wickets	Delhi; 9 runs	Chennai; 12 runs (D/L)	Match abandoned	Mumbai; 19 runs	Chennai; 38 runs	Chennai; 92 runs
Deccan Chargers	Chennai; 78 runs		Delhi; 6 wickets	Punjab; 3 wickets	Deccan; 8 wickets	Deccan; 12 runs	Rajasthan; 3 wickets	Deccan; 24 runs
Delhi Daredevils	Chennai; 18 runs	Delhi; 12 runs		Delhi; 10 wickets (D/L)	Delhi; 9 wickets	Delhi; 7 wickets	Rajasthan; 5 wickets	Delhi; 6 wickets
Kings XI Punjab	Chennai; 24 runs	Punjab; 1 run	Punjab; 6 wickets		Kolkata; 11 runs (D/L)	Punjab; 3 runs	Punjab; 27 runs	Punjab; 7 wickets
Kolkata Knight Riders	Kolkata; 7 wickets	Deccan; 6 wickets	Delhi; 7 wickets	Punjab; 6 wickets		Mumbai; 92 runs	Rajasthan; Super Over	Bengaluru; 5 wickets
Mumbai Indians	Chennai; 7 wickets	Deccan; 19 runs	Delhi; 4 wickets	Mumbai; 8 wickets	Mumbai; 9 runs		Match abandoned	Bengaluru; 9 wickets
Rajasthan Royals	Chennai; 7 wickets	Deccan; 53 runs	Delhi; 14 runs	Rajasthan; 78 runs	Kolkata; 4 wickets	Rajasthan; 2 runs		Bengaluru; 75 runs
Royal Challengers Bengaluru	Bengaluru; 2 wickets	Bengaluru; 12 runs	Bengaluru; 7 wickets	Bengaluru; 8 runs	Bengaluru; 6 wickets	Mumbai; 16 runs	Rajasthan; 7 wickets	

Horizontal team won	Vertical team won

- Note: Results listed are according to the first encounter (top-right) and second encounter (bottom-left).
- Note: Click on a result to see a summary of the match.

Team	Group matches														Knockout	
Team	1	2	3	4	5	6	7	8	9	10	11	12	13	14	SF	F
Chennai Super Kings	0	2	2	3	3	5	7	9	11	13	13	15	15	17	L	
Deccan Chargers	2	4	6	8	8	8	8	10	10	12	12	14	14	14	W	W
Delhi Daredevils	2	4	6	6	8	8	10	12	14	16	16	18	18	20	L	
Kings XI Punjab	0	0	2	4	6	6	8	8	8	10	10	12	14	14		
Kolkata Knight Riders	0	2	2	3	3	3	3	3	3	3	3	3	5	7		
Mumbai Indians	2	3	3	5	5	7	7	7	7	9	11	11	11	11		
Rajasthan Royals	0	1	3	3	5	5	7	9	11	11	11	13	13	13		
Royal Challengers Bengaluru	2	2	2	2	2	4	6	8	8	8	10	12	14	16	W	L

Win	Loss	No result

- Note: The total points at the end of each group match are listed.
- Note: Click on the points (group matches) or W/L (playoffs) to see the match summary.

== League stage ==
Times are in Indian Standard Time (UTC+05:30). Subtract 3.5 hours for local time in South Africa

18 April
16:00
Scorecard

Mumbai Indians; 165/7 (20 overs)	v	Chennai Super Kings; 146/7 (20 overs)
Sachin Tendulkar 59* (49); Manpreet Gony 2/32 (4 overs)		Matthew Hayden 44 (35); Lasith Malinga 3/15 (4 overs)

Mumbai won by 19 runs
Newlands, Cape Town
Umpires: Billy Doctrove and Krishna Hariharan
Player of the match: Sachin Tendulkar (Mumbai)

- Chennai Super Kings won the toss and elected to field.

18 April
20:40 (D/N)
Scorecard

Royal Challengers Bangalore; 133/8 (20 overs)	v	Rajasthan Royals; 58 (15.1 overs)
Rahul Dravid 66 (48); Dimitri Mascarenhas 3/20 (4 overs)		Ravindra Jadeja 11 (10); Anil Kumble 5/5 (3.1 overs)

Bangalore won by 75 runs
Newlands, Cape Town
Umpires: Billy Doctrove and Russell Tiffin
Player of the match: Rahul Dravid (Bangalore)

- Royal Challengers Bangalore won the toss and elected to bat.

19 April
16:00
Scorecard

Kings XI Punjab; 104/7 (12 overs)	v	Delhi Daredevils; 58/0 (4.5 overs)
Karan Goel 38 (21); Daniel Vettori 3/15 (3 overs)		Virender Sehwag 38* (16)

Delhi won by 10 wickets (D/L)
Newlands, Cape Town
Umpires: Mark Benson and Shashank Ranade
Player of the match: Daniel Vettori (Delhi)

- Delhi Daredevils won the toss and elected to field.
- Rain first reduced the match to 12 overs a side. Subsequent rain reduced Delhi Dardevils' target to 54 in 6 overs according to the Duckworth–Lewis method.

19 April
22:20 (D/N)
Scorecard

Kolkata Knight Riders; 101 (19.4 overs)	v	Deccan Chargers; 104/2 (13.1 overs)
Brad Hodge 31 (34); R.P. Singh 4/22 (3.4 overs)		Herschelle Gibbs 43* (26); Ashok Dinda 1/24 (3 overs)

Deccan won by 8 wickets
Newlands, Cape Town
Umpires: Mark Benson and Billy Doctrove
Player of the match: R. P. Singh (Deccan)

- Kolkata Knight Riders won the toss and elected to bat.

20 April
20:00 (D/N)
Scorecard

Chennai Super Kings; 179/5 (20 overs)	v	Royal Challengers Bangalore; 87 (15.2 overs)
Matthew Hayden 65 (35); Praveen Kumar 2/37 (4 overs)		Jacques Kallis 24 (19); Muttiah Muralitharan 3/11 (4 overs)

Chennai won by 92 runs
St George's Park, Port Elizabeth
Umpires: Brian Jerling and Simon Taufel
Player of the match: Muttiah Muralitharan (Chennai)

- Chennai Super Kings won the toss and elected to bat.

21 April
16:00
Scorecard

Kings XI Punjab; 158/6 (20 overs)	v	Kolkata Knight Riders; 79/1 (9.2 overs)
Yuvraj Singh 38 (28); Sourav Ganguly 2/24 (4 overs)		Chris Gayle 44* (26); Vikramjeet Malik 1/32 (2 overs)

Kolkata won by 11 runs (D/L)
Kingsmead, Durban
Umpires: Daryl Harper and Shashank Ranade
Player of the match: Chris Gayle (Kolkata)

- Kolkata Knight Riders won the toss and elected to field.
- Rain ended the match after 9.2 overs in Kolkata Knight Riders' innings. Their target was revised to 69 according to the Duckworth–Lewis method.

21 April
20:00 (D/N)
Scorecard

Rajasthan Royals	v	Mumbai Indians

Match abandoned without a ball bowled
Kingsmead, Durban
Umpires: Daryl Harper and Tyron Wijewardene

- Match abandoned without a ball bowled due to rain.

22 April
20:00 (D/N)
Scorecard

Deccan Chargers; 184/6 (20 overs)	v	Royal Challengers Bangalore; 160/8 (20 overs)
Adam Gilchrist 71 (45); Kevin Pietersen 2/31 (4 overs)		Virat Kohli 50 (32); Scott Styris 3/32 (4 overs)

Deccan won by 24 runs
Newlands, Cape Town
Umpires: Marais Erasmus and Amiesh Saheba
Player of the match: Adam Gilchrist (Deccan)

- Deccan Chargers won the toss and elected to bat.

23 April
16:00
Scorecard

Delhi Daredevils; 189/5 (20 overs)	v	Chennai Super Kings; 180/9 (20 overs)
AB de Villiers 105* (54); Lakshmipathy Balaji 3/19 (4 overs)		Matthew Hayden 57 (27); Pradeep Sangwan 3/28 (4 overs)

Delhi won by 9 runs
Kingsmead, Durban
Umpires: Shashank Ranade and Simon Taufel
Player of the match: AB de Villiers (Delhi)

- Delhi Daredevils won the toss and elected to bat.

23 April
20:15 (D/N)
Scorecard

Rajasthan Royals; 150/6 (20 overs)	v	Kolkata Knight Riders; 150/8 (20 overs)
Yusuf Pathan 42 (21); Anureet Singh 2/35 (4 overs)		Sourav Ganguly 46 (30); Kamran Khan 3/18 (4 overs)

Match tied
(Rajasthan won the Super Over)
Newlands, Cape Town
Umpires: Mark Benson and Marais Erasmus
Player of the match: Yusuf Pathan (Rajasthan)

- Kolkata Knight Riders won the toss and elected to field.
- Super Over: Kolkata 14/1 (1 over), Rajasthan 18/0 (0.4 over).

24 April
20:00 (D/N)
Scorecard

Royal Challengers Bangalore; 168/9 (20 overs)	v	Kings XI Punjab; 173/3 (19 overs)
Jacques Kallis 62 (46); Yusuf Abdullah 4/31 (4 overs)		Ravi Bopara 84 (59); Anil Kumble 1/19 (4 overs)

Punjab won by 7 wickets
Kingsmead, Durban
Umpires: Billy Doctrove and Tyron Wijewardene
Player of the match: Ravi Bopara (Punjab)

- Royal Challengers Bangalore won the toss and elected to bat.

25 April
16:00
Scorecard

Deccan Chargers; 168/9 (20 overs)	v	Mumbai Indians; 156/7 (20 overs)
Herschelle Gibbs 58 (44); Lasith Malinga 3/19 (4 overs)		Jean-Paul Duminy 47 (40); Pragyan Ojha 3/21 (4 overs)

Deccan won by 12 runs
Kingsmead, Durban
Umpires: Kumar Dharmasena and Simon Taufel
Player of the match: Pragyan Ojha (Deccan)

- Deccan Chargers won the toss and elected to bat.

25 April
20:15 (D/N)
Scorecard

Chennai Super Kings	v	Kolkata Knight Riders

Match abandoned without a ball bowled
Newlands, Cape Town
Umpires: Mark Benson and Amiesh Saheba

- Match abandoned without a ball bowled due to rain.

26 April
16:00
Scorecard

Royal Challengers Bangalore; 149/7 (20 overs)	v	Delhi Daredevils; 153/4 (19.2 overs)
Kevin Pietersen 37 (40); Ashish Nehra 2/34 (4 overs)		Tillakaratne Dilshan 67 (47); Pankaj Singh 2/31 (4 overs)

Delhi won by 6 wickets
St George's Park, Port Elizabeth
Umpires: Sudhir Asnani and Brian Jerling
Player of the match: Tillakaratne Dilshan (Delhi)

- Royal Challengers won the toss and elected to bat.

26 April
20:15 (D/N)
Scorecard

Kings XI Punjab; 139/6 (20 overs)	v	Rajasthan Royals; 112/7 (20 overs)
Kumar Sangakkara 60 (51); Kamran Khan 2/15 (4 overs)		Ravindra Jadeja 37 (44); Yusuf Abdulla 3/21 (4 overs)

Punjab won by 27 runs
Newlands, Cape Town
Umpires: Marais Erasmus and Krishna Hariharan
Player of the match: Kumar Sangakkara (Punjab)

- Kings XI Punjab won the toss and elected to bat.

27 April
16:00
Scorecard

Chennai Super Kings; 165/6 (20 overs)	v	Deccan Chargers; 169/4 (20 overs)
Matthew Hayden 49 (35); Pragyan Ojha 2/11 (2 overs)		Herschelle Gibbs 69 (56); Suresh Raina 2/18 (4 overs)

Deccan Chargers won by 6 wickets
Kingsmead, Durban
Umpires: Shashank Ranade and Tyron Wijewardene
Player of the match: Herschelle Gibbs (Deccan)

- Deccan Chargers won the toss and elected to field.

27 April
20:15 (D/N)
Scorecard

Mumbai Indians; 187/6 (20 overs)	v	Kolkata Knight Riders; 95 (15.2 overs)
Sachin Tendulkar 68 (45); Laxmi Shukla 3/25 (4 overs)		Saurav Ganguly 34 (30); Lasith Malinga 3/11 (2.2 overs)

Mumbai won by 92 runs
St George's Park, Port Elizabeth
Umpires: Brian Jerling and Russell Tiffin
Player of the match: Sachin Tendulkar (Mumbai)

- Mumbai Indians won the toss and elected to bat.

28 April
20:00 (D/N)
Scorecard

Delhi Daredevils; 143/7 (20 overs)	v	Rajasthan Royals; 147/5 (18.3 overs)
AB de Villiers 50 (40); Munaf Patel 2/14 (4 overs)		Yusuf Pathan 62 (30); Amit Mishra 3/34 (4 overs)

Rajasthan won by 5 wickets
SuperSport Park, Centurion
Umpires: Gary Baxter and Rudi Koertzen
Player of the match: Yusuf Pathan (Rajasthan)

- Delhi Daredevils won the toss and elected to bat.

29 April
16:00
Scorecard

Kolkata Knight Riders; 139/6 (20 overs)	v	Royal Challengers Bangalore; 143/5 (19.5 overs)
Morne van Wyk 43* (35); Anil Kumble 2/16 (4 overs)		Shreevats Goswami 43 (46); Brad Hodge 3/29 (4 overs)

Bangalore won by 5 wickets
Kingsmead, Durban
Umpires: Mark Benson and Tyron Wijewardene
Player of the match: Mark Boucher (Bangalore)

- Kolkata Knight Riders won the toss and elected to bat.

29 April
20:00 (D/N)
Scorecard

Kings XI Punjab; 119/8 (20 overs)	v	Mumbai Indians; 116/7 (20 overs)
Kumar Sangakkara 45* (44); Lasith Malinga 2/12 (4 overs)		Jean-Paul Duminy 59 (63); Yusuf Abdullah 2/19 (4 overs)

Punjab won by 3 runs
Kingsmead, Durban
Umpires: Mark Benson and Suresh Shastri
Player of the match: Kumar Sangakkara (Punjab)

- Kings XI Punjab won the toss and elected to bat.

30 April
16:00
Scorecard

Deccan Chargers; 148/9 (20 overs)	v	Delhi Daredevils; 150/4 (18.4 overs)
Dwayne Smith 48 (28); Dirk Nannes 2/16 (4 overs)		Tillakaratne Dilshan 52* (46); Shoaib Ahmed 2/20 (4 overs)

Delhi won by 6 wickets
SuperSport Park, Centurion
Umpires: Gary Baxter and Amiesh Saheba
Player of the match: Dirk Nannes (Delhi)

- Delhi Daredevils won the toss and elected to field.

30 April
20:00 (D/N)
Scorecard

Chennai Super Kings; 164/5 (20 overs)	v	Rajasthan Royals; 126 (19.3 overs)
Suresh Raina 98 (55); Yusuf Pathan 2/17 (3 overs)		Rob Quiney 28 (31); Lakshmipathy Balaji 4/21 (3.3 overs)

Chennai won by 38 runs
SuperSport Park, Centurion
Umpires: Gary Baxter and Rudi Koertzen
Player of the match: Suresh Raina (Chennai)

- Rajasthan Royals won the toss and elected to field.

1 May
16:00
Scorecard

Mumbai Indians; 148/6 (20 overs)	v	Kolkata Knight Riders; 139/6 (20 overs)
Jean-Paul Duminy 52 (37); Chris Gayle 1/21 (4 overs)		Brad Hodge 73 (60); Zaheer Khan 3/31 (4 overs)

Mumbai won by 9 runs
Buffalo Park, East London
Umpires: Marais Erasmus and Shavir Tarapore
Player of the match: Jean-Paul Duminy (Mumbai)

- Mumbai Indians won the toss and elected to bat.

1 May
20:15 (D/N)
Scorecard

Royal Challengers Bangalore; 145/9 (20 overs)	v	Kings XI Punjab; 137/7 (20 overs)
Roelof van der Merwe 35 (19); Yusuf Abdulla 4/36 (4 overs)		Yuvraj Singh 50 (34); Roelof van der Merwe 2/22 (4 overs)

Bangalore won by 8 runs
Kingsmead, Durban
Umpires: Kumar Dharmasena and S. Ravi
Player of the match: Yuvraj Singh (Punjab)

- Royal Challengers won the toss and elected to bat.
- Yuvraj Singh (Kings XI Punjab) took a hat-trick.

2 May
16:00
Scorecard

Deccan Chargers; 141/5 (20 overs)	v	Rajasthan Royals; 142/7 (19.4 overs)
Tirumalsetti Suman 41 (35); Shane Harwood 2/25 (4 overs)		Lee Carseldine 39 (32); RP Singh 2/18 (4 overs)

Rajasthan won by 3 wickets
St George's Park, Port Elizabeth
Umpires: Sudhir Asnani and Brian Jerling
Player of the match: Yusuf Pathan (Rajasthan)

- Deccan Chargers won the toss and elected to bat.

2 May
20:15 (D/N)
Scorecard

Chennai Super Kings; 163 (20 overs)	v	Delhi Daredevils; 145/8 (20 overs)
Subramaniam Badrinath 45 (34); Dirk Nannes 3/27 (4 overs)		Dinesh Karthik 52 (31); Shadab Jakati 4/24 (4 overs)

Chennai won by 18 runs
New Wanderers Stadium, Johannesburg
Umpires: Daryl Harper and Sanjay Hazare
Player of the match: Shadab Jakati (Chennai)

- Delhi Daredevils won the toss and elected to field.

3 May
16:00
Scorecard

Kolkata Knight Riders; 153/3 (20 overs)	v	Kings XI Punjab; 154/4 (20 overs)
Brad Hodge 70* (43); Piyush Chawla 2/27 (4 overs)		Mahela Jayawardene 52* (41); Ishant Sharma 2/27 (4 overs)

Punjab won by 6 wickets
St George's Park, Port Elizabeth
Umpires: Sudhir Asnani and Mark Benson
Player of the match: Mahela Jayawardene (Punjab)

- Kolkata Knight Riders won the toss and elected to bat.

3 May
20:15 (D/N)
Scorecard

Mumbai Indians; 149/4 (20 overs)	v	Royal Challengers Bangalore; 150/1 (18.1 overs)
Sanath Jayasuriya 52 (43); Dillon du Preez 3/32 (4 overs)		Jacques Kallis 69* (59); Zaheer Khan 1/12 (2 overs)

Bangalore won by 9 wickets
New Wanderers Stadium, Johannesburg
Umpires: Rudi Koertzen and Tyron Wijewardene
Player of the match: Jacques Kallis (Bangalore)

- Mumbai Indians won the toss and elected to bat.

4 May
20:00 (D/N)
Scorecard

Chennai Super Kings; 178/3 (20 overs)	v	Deccan Chargers; 100 (14.4 overs)
M.S. Dhoni 58* (37); Shoaib Ahmed 1/14 (2 overs)		Dwayne Smith 49 (23); Shadab Jakati 4/22 (4 overs)

Chennai won by 78 runs
Buffalo Park, East London
Umpires: Marais Erasmus and Billy Doctrove
Player of the match: M.S. Dhoni (Chennai)

- Chennai Super Kings won the toss and elected to bat.

5 May
16:00
Scorecard

Rajasthan Royals; 211/4 (20 overs)	v	Kings XI Punjab; 133/8 (20 overs)
Graeme Smith 77 (44); Piyush Chawla 2/30 (4 overs)		Yuvraj Singh 48 (37); Amit Singh 3/9 (4 overs)

Rajasthan won by 78 runs
Kingsmead, Durban
Umpires: Sanjay Hazare and Ian Howell
Player of the match: Graeme Smith (Rajasthan)

- Kings XI Punjab won the toss and elected to field.

5 May
20:00 (D/N)
Scorecard

Kolkata Knight Riders; 154/3 (20 overs)	v	Delhi Daredevils; 157/1 (19 overs)
Morne van Wyk 74 (48); Pradeep Sangwan 2/29 (4 overs)		Gautam Gambhir 71 (57); Ajit Agarkar 1/24 (3 overs)

Delhi won by 9 wickets
Kingsmead, Durban
Umpires: Gary Baxter and Ian Howell
Player of the match: Gautam Gambhir (Delhi)

- Kolkata Knight Riders won the toss and elected to bat.

6 May
20:00 (D/N)
Scorecard

Deccan Chargers; 145/6 (20 overs)	v	Mumbai Indians; 126/8 (20 overs)
Rohit Sharma 38 (36); Dhawal Kulkarni 1/21 (4 overs)		Jean-Paul Duminy 52 (48); Rohit Sharma 4/6 (2 overs)

Deccan won by 19 runs
SuperSport Park, Centurion
Umpires: Mark Benson and Kumar Dharmasena
Player of the match: Rohit Sharma (Deccan)

- Deccan Chargers won the toss and elected to bat.
- Rohit Sharma (Deccan Chargers) took a hat-trick.

7 May
16:00
Scorecard

Royal Challengers Bangalore; 105/10 (20 overs)	v	Rajasthan Royals; 107/3 (15 overs)
Robin Uthappa 17 (20); Amit Singh 4/19 (4 overs)		Naman Ojha 52* (38); Jacques Kallis 1/20 (4 overs)

Rajasthan won by 7 wickets
SuperSport Park, Centurion
Umpires: Krishna Hariharan and Daryl Harper
Player of the match: Amit Singh (Rajasthan)

- Rajasthan Royals won the toss and elected to field.

7 May
20:00 (D/N)
Scorecard

Chennai Super Kings; 185/3 (18 overs)	v	Kings XI Punjab; 174/3 (18 overs)
Matthew Hayden 89 (58); Piyush Chawla 1/28 (3 overs)		Yuvraj Singh 58* (36); Shadab Jakati 1/20 (2 overs)

Chennai won by 12 runs (D/L)
SuperSport Park, Centurion
Umpires: Daryl Harper and Tyron Wijewardene
Player of the match: Matthew Hayden (Chennai)

- Chennai Super Kings won the toss and elected to bat.
- Rain during the 1st innings reduced the game to 18 overs a side and revised the Kings XI Punjab's target to 187 according to the Duckworth–Lewis method.

8 May
20:00 (D/N)
Scorecard

Mumbai Indians; 116 (20 overs)	v	Delhi Daredevils; 118/3 (18.5 overs)
Dwayne Bravo 35 (30); Rajat Bhatia 3/15 (4 overs)		AB de Villiers 50* (38); JP Duminy 1/15 (4 overs)

Delhi won by 7 wickets
Buffalo Park, East London
Umpires: Marais Erasmus and Shavir Tarapore
Player of the match: Ashish Nehra (Delhi)

- Mumbai Indians won the toss and elected to bat.

9 May
16:00
Scorecard

Deccan Chargers; 168/5 (20 overs)	v	Kings XI Punjab; 169/7 (19.5 overs)
Andrew Symonds 60* (36); Brett Lee 1/24 (4 overs)		Mahela Jayawardene 43 (28); Rohit Sharma 2/12 (2 overs)

Punjab won by 3 wickets
De Beers Diamond Oval, Kimberley
Umpires: Gary Baxter and Amiesh Saheba
Player of the match: Mahela Jayawardene (Punjab)

- Kings XI Punjab won the toss and elected to field.

9 May
20:00 (D/N)
Scorecard

Chennai Super Kings; 141/3 (18.2 overs)	v	Rajasthan Royals; 140/7 (20 overs)
Subramaniam Badrinath 59* (41); Siddharth Trivedi 1/23 (3 overs)		Graeme Smith 30 (33); Muttiah Muralitharan 2/22 (4 overs)

Chennai won by 7 wickets
De Beers Diamond Oval, Kimberley
Umpires: Gary Baxter and Kumar Dharmasena
Player of the match: Subramaniam Badrinath (Chennai)

- Rajasthan Royals won the toss and elected to bat.

10 May
16:00
Scorecard

Mumbai Indians; 157/2 (20 overs)	v	Royal Challengers Bangalore; 141/7 (20 overs)
Ajinkya Rahane 62* (49); Roelof van der Merwe 1/17 (3 overs)		Mark Boucher 48* (33); Harbhajan Singh 2/15 (4 overs)

Mumbai won by 16 runs
St George's Park, Port Elizabeth
Umpires: Billy Doctrove and Brian Jerling
Player of the match: Jean-Paul Duminy (Mumbai)

- Mumbai Indians won the toss and elected to bat.

10 May
20:15 (D/N)
Scorecard

Kolkata Knight Riders; 123/8 (20 overs)	v	Delhi Daredevils; 125/3 (17.1 overs)
Saurav Ganguly 44 (45); Amit Mishra 3/14 (4 overs)		AB de Villiers 40 (32); Ishant Sharma 2/23 (4 overs)

Delhi won by 7 wickets
New Wanderers Stadium, Johannesburg
Umpires: Suresh Shastri and Russell Tiffin
Player of the match: Amit Mishra (Delhi)

- Delhi Daredevils won the toss and elected to field.
- Kolkata Knight Riders were eliminated as a result of this match.

11 May
20:00 (D/N)
Scorecard

Deccan Chargers; 166/7 (20 overs)	v	Rajasthan Royals; 113 (19.3 overs)
Dwayne Smith 47 (32); Yusuf Pathan 3/34 (4 overs)		Swapnil Asnodkar 44 (39); Rohit Sharma 3/12 (3 overs)

Deccan won by 53 runs
De Beers Diamond Oval, Kimberley
Umpires: Gary Baxter and Kumar Dharmasena
Player of the match: Dwayne Smith (Deccan)

- Deccan Chargers won the toss and elected to bat.

12 May
16:00
Scorecard

Royal Challengers Bangalore; 176/4 (19.2 overs)	v	Kolkata Knight Riders; 173/4 (20 overs)
Ross Taylor 81* (33); Murali Kartik 2/28 (4 overs)		Brendon McCullum 84* (64); Vinay Kumar 2/33 (4 overs)

Bangalore won by 6 wickets
SuperSport Park, Centurion
Umpires: Marais Erasmus and Sanjay Hazare
Player of the match: Ross Taylor (Bangalore)

- Royal Challengers won the toss and elected to field.

12 May
20:00 (D/N)
Scorecard

Kings XI Punjab; 119/9 (20 overs)	v	Mumbai Indians; 122/2 (16.2 overs)
Sunny Sohal 43 (23); JP Duminy 2/15 (4 overs)		Dwayne Bravo 70* (59); Brett Lee 1/25 (4 overs)

Mumbai won by 8 wickets
SuperSport Park, Centurion
Umpires: Sanjay Hazare and Rudi Koertzen
Player of the match: Harbhajan Singh (Mumbai)

- Kings IX Punjab won the toss and elected to bat.

13 May
20:00 (D/N)
Scorecard

Delhi Daredevils; 173/7 (20 overs)	v	Deccan Chargers; 161 (19.4 overs)
Dinesh Karthik 44* (23); Pragyan Ojha 2/26 (4 overs)		Adam Gilchrist 64 (33); Rajat Bhatia 4/15 (2.4 overs)

Delhi won by 12 runs
Kingsmead, Durban
Umpires: Daryl Harper and Suresh Shastri
Player of the match: Rajat Bhatia (Delhi)

- Deccan Chargers won the toss and elected to field.
- Delhi Daredevils qualified for playoffs as a result of this match.

14 May
16:00
Scorecard

Chennai Super Kings; 129 (19.4 overs)	v	Royal Challengers Bangalore; 132/8 (19.4 overs)
Matthew Hayden 60 (38); Anil Kumble 2/12 (4 overs)		Ross Taylor 46 (50); Jacob Oram 2/12 (1.4 overs)

Bangalore won by 2 wickets
Kingsmead, Durban
Umpires: Billy Doctrove and Daryl Harper
Player of the match: Ross Taylor (Bangalore)

- Chennai Super Kings won the toss and elected to bat.

14 May
20:00 (D/N)
Scorecard

Rajasthan Royals; 145/7 (20 overs)	v	Mumbai Indians; 143 (19.5 overs)
Rob Quiney 51 (40); Sanath Jayasuriya 2/3 (1 over)		Sachin Tendulkar 40 (30); Shane Warne 3/24 (4 overs)

Rajasthan won by 2 runs
Kingsmead, Durban
Umpires: Billy Doctrove and Daryl Harper
Player of the match: Shane Warne (Rajasthan)

- Rajasthan Royals won the toss and elected to bat.

15 May
20:00 (D/N)
Scorecard

Delhi Daredevils; 120/9 (20 overs)	v	Kings XI Punjab; 123/4 (19.1 overs)
Dinesh Karthik 32 (29); Brett Lee 3/15 (4 overs)		Kumar Sangakkara 47 (43); Farveez Maharoof 2/29 (4 overs)

Punjab won by 6 wickets
OUTsurance Oval, Bloemfontein
Umpires: Kumar Dharmasena and Ian Howell
Player of the match: Brett Lee (Punjab)

- Kings XI Punjab won the toss and elected to field.

16 May
16:00
Scorecard

Mumbai Indians; 147/5 (20 overs)	v	Chennai Super Kings; 151/3 (19.1 overs)
JP Duminy 62 (40); Suresh Raina 1/22 (4 overs)		Matthew Hayden 60 (57); Lasith Malinga 1/19 (4 overs)

Chennai won by 7 wickets
St George's Park, Port Elizabeth
Umpires: Shavir Tarapore and Simon Taufel
Player of the match: Matthew Hayden (Chennai)

- Mumbai Indians won the toss and elected to bat.

16 May
20:15 (D/N)
Scorecard

Kolkata Knight Riders; 160/5 (20 overs)	v	Deccan Chargers; 166/4 (20 overs)
Brad Hodge 48 (41); Ryan Harris 2/20 (4 overs)		Adam Gilchrist 43 (31); Murali Karthik 1/12 (4 overs)

Deccan won by 6 wickets
New Wanderers Stadium, Johannesburg
Umpires: S. Ravi and Rudi Koertzen
Player of the match: Rohit Sharma (Deccan)

- Deccan Chargers won the toss and elected to field.
- Deccan Chargers became the first IPL team to hit a six off the final ball of a match to win.

17 May
16:00
Scorecard

Kings XI Punjab; 134/7 (20 overs)	v	Deccan Chargers; 133/8 (20 overs)
Kumar Sangakkara 56 (43); RP Singh 3/26 (4 overs)		Rohit Sharma 42 (26); Yuvraj Singh 3/13 (4 overs)

Punjab won by 1 run
New Wanderers Stadium, Johannesburg
Umpires: S. Ravi and Russell Tiffin
Player of the match: Yuvraj Singh (Punjab)

- Deccan Chargers won the toss and elected to field.
- Yuvraj Singh (Kings XI Punjab) took his second hat-trick.
Mumbai Indians were eliminated as a result of this match.

17 May
20:15 (D/N)
Scorecard

Delhi Daredevils; 150/3 (20 overs)	v	Rajasthan Royals; 136/9 (20 overs)
AB de Villiers 79 (55); Munaf Patel 2/39 (4 overs)		Johan Botha 37 (31); Amit Mishra 3/33 (4 overs)

Delhi won by 14 runs
OUTsurance Oval, Bloemfontein
Umpires: Sanjay Hazare and Ian Howell
Player of the match: AB de Villiers (Delhi)

- Delhi Daredevils won the toss and elected to bat.

18 May
20:00 (D/N)
Scorecard

Chennai Super Kings; 188/3 (20 overs)	v	Kolkata Knight Riders; 189/3 (20 overs)
Suresh Raina 52 (37); Ashok Dinda 1/29 (4 overs)		Brendon McCullum 81 (48); Muttiah Muralitharan 1/16 (4 overs)

Kolkata won by 7 wickets
SuperSport Park, Centurion
Umpires: Simon Taufel and Russell Tiffin
Player of the match: Brad Hodge (Kolkata)

- Chennai Super Kings won the toss and elected to bat.

19 May
20:00 (D/N)
Scorecard

Delhi Daredevils; 134/7 (20 overs)	v	Royal Challengers Bangalore; 135/3 (19 overs)
Dinesh Karthik 31 (29); Praveen Kumar 3/30 (4 overs)		Jacques Kallis 58* (56); Yogesh Nagar 2/20 (2 overs)

Bangalore won by 7 wickets
New Wanderers Stadium, Johannesburg
Umpires: Sudhir Asnani and Russell Tiffin
Player of the match: Jacques Kallis (Bangalore)

- Delhi Daredevils won the toss and elected to bat.

20 May
16:00
Scorecard

Rajasthan Royals; 101/9 (20 overs)	v	Kolkata Knight Riders; 102/6 (19.3 overs)
Naman Ojha 22 (12); Charl Langeveldt 3/15 (4 overs)		Laxmi Shukla 48* (46); Munaf Patel 2/14 (4 overs)

Kolkata won by 4 wickets
Kingsmead, Durban
Umpires: Simon Taufel and Brian Jerling
Player of the match: Laxmi Shukla (Kolkata)

- Kolkata Knight Riders won the toss and elected to field.
- Chennai Super Kings qualified for the playoffs, and Rajasthan Royals were eliminated as a result of this match.

20 May
20:00 (D/N)
Scorecard

Chennai Super Kings; 116/9 (20 overs)	v	Kings XI Punjab; 92/8 (20 overs)
Parthiv Patel 32 (23); Sreesanth 2/23 (4 overs)		Luke Pomersbach 26 (32); Muttiah Muralitharan 2/8 (4 overs)

Chennai won by 24 runs
Kingsmead, Durban
Umpires: Simon Taufel and Brian Jerling
Player of the match: Muttiah Muralitharan (Chennai)

- Chennai Super Kings won the toss and elected to bat.

21 May
16:00
Scorecard

Mumbai Indians; 165/8 (20 overs)	v	Delhi Daredevils; 166/6 (17.3 overs)
Ajinkya Rahane 56 (41); Dirk Nannes 3/27 (4 overs)		Virender Sehwag 50 (27); Harbhajan Singh 4/16 (4 overs)

Delhi won by 4 wickets
SuperSport Park, Centurion
Umpires: Ian Howell and S. Ravi
Player of the match: Virender Sehwag (Delhi)

- Delhi Daredevils won the toss and elected to field.

21 May
20:00 (D/N)
Scorecard

Royal Challengers Bangalore; 170/4 (20 overs)	v	Deccan Chargers; 158/6 (20 overs)
Manish Pandey 114* (73); Pragyan Ojha 2/32 (4 overs)		Herschelle Gibbs 60 (43); Balachandra Akhil 2/18 (4 overs)

Bangalore won by 12 runs
SuperSport Park, Centurion
Umpires: Ian Howell and S. Ravi
Player of the match: Manish Pandey (Bangalore)

- Royal Challengers Bangalore won the toss and elected to bat.
- Manish Pandey became the first Indian player to score a century in the IPL.
- Deccan Chargers and Royal Challengers Bangalore qualified for playoffs, and Kings XI Punjab were eliminated as a result of this match.

== Playoffs ==
Semi-finals
22 May — SuperSport Park, Centurion
1	Delhi Daredevils	153/8 (20 overs)
4	Deccan Chargers	154/4 (17.4 overs)
23 May — New Wanderers Stadium, Johannesburg
2	Chennai Super Kings	146/5 (20 overs)
3	Royal Challengers Bangalore	149/4 (18.5 overs)

Final
24 May — New Wanderers Stadium, Johannesburg
SF1W	Deccan Chargers	143/6 (20 overs)
SF2W	Royal Challengers Bangalore	137/9 (20 overs)

=== Semi-final 1 ===
22 May
20:00 (D/N)
scorecard

Delhi Daredevils; 153/8 (20 overs)	v	Deccan Chargers; 154/4 (17.4 overs)
Tillakaratne Dilshan 65 (51); Ryan Harris 3/27 (4 overs)		Adam Gilchrist 85 (35); Amit Mishra 3/19 (4 overs)

Deccan won by 6 wickets
SuperSport Park, Centurion
Umpires: Billy Doctrove and Daryl Harper
Player of the match: Adam Gilchrist (Deccan)

- Deccan Chargers won the toss and elected to field.

=== Semi-final 2 ===
23 May
20:00 (D/N)
scorecard

Chennai Super Kings; 146/5 (20 overs)	v	Royal Challengers Bangalore; 149/4 (18.5 overs)
Parthiv Patel 36 (27); Vinay Kumar 2/38 (4 overs)		Manish Pandey 48 (35); Muttiah Muralitharan 1/15 (4 overs)

Bangalore won by 6 wickets
New Wanderers Stadium, Johannesburg
Umpires: Simon Taufel and Rudi Koertzen
Player of the match: Manish Pandey (Bangalore)

- Royal Challengers Bangalore won the toss and elected to field.

=== Final ===
24 May
20:00 (D/N)
scorecard

Deccan Chargers; 143/6 (20 overs)	v	Royal Challengers Bangalore; 137/9 (20 overs)
Herschelle Gibbs 53 (48); Anil Kumble 4/16 (4 overs)		Roelof van der Merwe 32 (21); Pragyan Ojha 3/28 (4 overs)

Deccan won by 6 runs
New Wanderers Stadium, Johannesburg
Umpires: Rudi Koertzen and Simon Taufel
Player of the match: Anil Kumble (Bangalore)

- Royal Challengers Bangalore won the toss and elected to field.

== Statistics and awards ==
=== Most runs ===
Player	Team	Inns	Runs	HS
Matthew Hayden	Chennai Super Kings	12	572	65
Adam Gilchrist	Deccan Chargers	16	495	85
AB de Villiers	Delhi Daredevils	13	465	105*
Suresh Raina	Chennai Super Kings	14	434	98
Tillakaratne Dilshan	Delhi Daredevils	13	418	67*

The tournament's leading scorer wore an orange cap when fielding.

Full Table on ESPNcricinfo

=== Most wickets ===
Player	Team	Matches	Wickets	Best bowling
R.P. Singh	Deccan Chargers	16	23	4/22
Anil Kumble	Royal Challengers Bangalore	16	21	5/5
Ashish Nehra	Delhi Daredevils	13	19	3/27
Lasith Malinga	Mumbai Indians	13	18	3/11
Pragyan Ojha	Deccan Chargers	15	18	3/21

The tournament's leading wicket taker wore a purple cap when fielding.

Full Table on ESPNcricinfo

=== Awards ===
- Player of the tournament: Adam Gilchrist - Deccan Chargers
- Player of the final: Anil Kumble - Royal Challengers Bangalore
- Under-23 success of the tournament: Rohit Sharma (333 runs, 11 wickets) - Deccan Chargers
- Kingfisher Fair Play Award: Kings XI Punjab

== See also ==
- List of 2009 Indian Premier League personnel changes
