= 2010 Indian Premier League =

Cricket tournament

- Dates: 12 March 2010 – 25 April 2010
- Administrator: Board of Control for Cricket in India
- Cricket format: Twenty20
- Tournament format(s): Double round-robin and knockout
- Champions: Chennai Super Kings (1st title)
- Runners-up: Mumbai Indians
- Participants: 8
- Matches: 60
- Player of the series: Sachin Tendulkar (MI)
- Most runs: Sachin Tendulkar (MI) (618)
- Most wickets: Pragyan Ojha (Deccan Chargers) (21)
- Official website: www.iplt20.com

The 2010 Indian Premier League season, abbreviated as IPL 3 or the 2010 IPL, was the third season of the Indian Premier League, established by the Board of Control for Cricket in India (BCCI) in 2007. The tournament was hosted by India and had an estimated television audience of more than 200 million people in the country. It was played between 12 March and 25 April 2010. It was also the first ever cricket tournament that was broadcast live on YouTube. The final four matches of the tournament were screened in 3D across movie halls in India.

The tournament was won by the Chennai Super Kings, who defeated the Mumbai Indians in the final played at Mumbai. The purple cap went to Pragyan Ojha of Deccan Chargers, while the orange cap and the player of the tournament award were awarded to Sachin Tendulkar of the Mumbai Indians. Saurabh Tiwary was declared the U-23 success of the tournament, while the Chennai Super Kings won the Fair Play.

== Venues ==
Five new venues were introduced for the third edition of IPL. These included Nagpur, Cuttack, Mumbai, Ahmedabad, and Dharamsala. Nagpur, Cuttack and Mumbai amongst them hosted the home games for Deccan Chargers, and Ahmedabad and Dharamsala shared some of the home matches of Rajasthan Royals and Kings XI Punjab respectively. Additionally, Hyderabad, which hosted all Deccan's home games in 2008, did not host any games this season. This was attributed to the possibility of unrest due to a Telangana state succession.

The 60-game tournament also featured a third-place playoff between the losing semi-finalists as a qualifier for the Champions League and also saw the induction of ICL players. Both semi-finals were scheduled to be hosted in Bangalore but instead were played in Mumbai. The final and the third place playoff games were played at Mumbai and the season ended five days before the World Twenty20 in West Indies.

Chennai	Mumbai	Mohali	Kolkata
Chennai Super Kings	Mumbai Indians	Kings XI Punjab	Kolkata Knight Riders
M. A. Chidambaram Stadium	Brabourne Stadium	PCA Stadium	Eden Gardens
Capacity: 50,000	Capacity: 20,000	Capacity: 30,000	Capacity: 90,000
Ahmedabad	2010 Indian Premier League is located in India		Bangalore
Rajasthan Royals	2010 Indian Premier League is located in India		Royal Challengers Bangalore
Sardar Patel Stadium	2010 Indian Premier League is located in India		M. Chinnaswamy Stadium
Capacity: 54,000	2010 Indian Premier League is located in India		Capacity: 45,000
Cuttack	2010 Indian Premier League is located in India		Nagpur
Deccan Chargers	2010 Indian Premier League is located in India		Deccan Chargers
Barabati Stadium	2010 Indian Premier League is located in India		Vidarbha Cricket Association Ground
Capacity: 45,000	2010 Indian Premier League is located in India		Capacity: 40,000
Dharamsala	Jaipur	Navi Mumbai	Delhi
Kings XI Punjab	Rajasthan Royals	Deccan Chargers	Delhi Daredevils
HPCA Cricket Stadium	Sawai Mansingh Stadium	DY Patil Stadium	Feroz Shah Kotla
Capacity: 21,000	Capacity: 30,000	Capacity: 55,000	Capacity: 48,000

== Security concerns ==
On 17 April, before the match between Royal Challengers Bangalore & Mumbai Indians started 2 bombs went off at M. Chinnaswamy Stadium in Bangalore, while another was defused. The game on the day did continue, however, after an hour's delay. As a consequence both semi-finals were moved out of the city to DY Patil Stadium in Navi Mumbai. A third device was defused on 18 April 2010. All three devices were hidden in the stadium's perimeter wall and the two explosions were believed to have injured 15 people. Initial investigations suggested that the explosives used in the devices were locally made and were of low intensity. Former cricketers Sir Ian Botham, Brian Lara, Steve Waugh, and Shaun Pollock urged the players not to give in to terrorism by opting out of the league.

== Player auction ==
11 players were sold at the player auction held on 19 January 2010 in Mumbai. This was from a list of 97 registered players, which was then shortlisted to 66. West Indian all rounder Kieron Pollard and New Zealand fast bowler Shane Bond were the highest bid players in the auction who were bought for $750,000 but not before their prices went in the silent tie breaker round. Kieron Pollard was bought by Mumbai Indians and Shane Bond by Kolkata Knight Riders.

== Rules and regulations ==
The rules and format were the same as the previous season with the exception of the strategic timeout. Each innings had two mandatory timeouts of two-and-a-half minutes each. The fielding captain must take one at the end of over six, seven, eight or nine, and the batsmen at the end of over 13, 14, 15 or 16. Points in the group stage were awarded as follows:

Points
Results	Points
Win	2 points
No Result	1 point
Loss	0 points

According to rules, if a match ended with the scores tied, the tie is broken with a one-over-per-side Super Over. The rules of the Super Over are as set out in the ICC Standard Twenty20 International match playing conditions (1 October 2009 version).

1. Team with most runs wins
2. If equal, the team with most number of boundary sixes throughout the entire match wins
3. If still equal, the team with most number of boundaries throughout the entire match wins
4. If still equal, the team taking the most wickets throughout the entire match wins
5. If still equal, a count-back from the final ball of the Super Over eliminator shall be conducted. The team with the higher scoring delivery shall be the winner.
6. If still equal, by coin toss.

== Teams and standings ==
=== League table ===
Pos	Team	Pld	W	L	NR	Pts	NRR
1	Mumbai Indians (R)	14	10	4	0	20	1.084
2	Deccan Chargers(4th)	14	8	6	0	16	−0.297
3	Chennai Super Kings (C)	14	7	7	0	14	0.274
4	Royal Challengers Bangalore (3rd)	14	7	7	0	14	0.219
5	Delhi Daredevils	14	7	7	0	14	0.021
6	Kolkata Knight Riders	14	7	7	0	14	−0.341
7	Rajasthan Royals	14	6	8	0	12	−0.514
8	Kings XI Punjab	14	4	10	0	8	−0.478

(C) = Champion; (R) = Runner-up; (3rd) = Winner of third place playoff.
Note: Top four teams will qualify for the playoffs.
Note: The winner, runner-up and winner of the third place playoff qualified for the 2010 Champions League Twenty20.

=== Match summary ===
Visitor team →	CSK	DC	DD	KXIP	KKR	MI	RR	RCB
Home team ↓	CSK	DC	DD	KXIP	KKR	MI	RR	RCB
Chennai Super Kings		Deccan; 31 runs	Delhi; 6 wickets	Punjab; Super Over	Chennai; 9 wickets	Chennai; 24 runs	Chennai; 23 runs	Chennai; 5 wickets
Deccan Chargers	Deccan; 6 wickets		Deccan; 10 runs	Deccan; 6 runs	Kolkata; 11 runs	Mumbai; 41 runs	Rajasthan; 2 runs	Deccan; 13 runs
Delhi Daredevils	Chennai; 5 wickets	Deccan; 11 runs		Punjab; 7 wickets	Delhi; 40 runs	Mumbai; 98 runs	Delhi; 67 runs	Delhi; 37 runs
Kings XI Punjab	Chennai; 6 wickets	Deccan; 5 wickets	Delhi; 5 wickets		Kolkata; 39 runs	Punjab; 6 wickets	Rajasthan; 31 runs	Bengaluru; 6 wickets
Kolkata Knight Riders	Chennai; 55 runs	Kolkata; 24 runs	Kolkata; 14 runs	Punjab; 8 wickets		Kolkata; 9 wickets	Kolkata; 8 wickets	Kolkata; 7 wickets
Mumbai Indians	Mumbai; 5 wickets	Mumbai; 63 runs	Mumbai; 39 runs	Mumbai; 4 wickets	Mumbai; 7 wickets		Mumbai; 4 runs	Bengaluru; 7 wickets
Rajasthan Royals	Rajasthan; 17 runs	Rajasthan; 8 wickets	Delhi; 6 wickets	Rajasthan; 9 wickets	Rajasthan; 34 runs	Mumbai; 37 runs		Bengaluru; 5 wickets
Royal Challengers Bengaluru	Bengaluru; 36 runs	Deccan; 7 wickets	Delhi; 17 runs	Bengaluru; 8 wickets	Bengaluru; 7 wickets	Mumbai; 57 runs	Bengaluru; 10 wickets	

Home team won	Visitor team won

- Note: Results listed are according to the home (horizontal) and visitor (vertical) teams.
- Note: Click on a result to see a summary of the match.

Team	Group matches														Knockout	
Team	1	2	3	4	5	6	7	8	9	10	11	12	13	14	SF	F
Chennai Super Kings	0	2	4	4	4	4	4	6	8	10	10	12	12	14	W	W
Deccan Chargers	0	2	4	6	6	6	6	6	6	8	10	12	14	16	L	
Delhi Daredevils	2	4	4	4	4	6	8	10	12	12	12	12	14	14		
Kings XI Punjab	0	0	0	2	2	2	2	2	4	4	6	8	8	8		
Kolkata Knight Riders	2	4	4	4	4	6	6	8	8	10	10	10	12	14		
Mumbai Indians	2	4	4	6	8	10	12	14	14	14	16	18	20	20	W	L
Rajasthan Royals	0	0	0	2	4	6	8	8	8	10	12	12	12	12		
Royal Challengers Bengaluru	0	2	4	6	8	8	8	10	10	10	12	12	14	14	L	

Win	Loss	No result

- Note: The total points at the end of each group match are listed.
- Note: Click on the points (group matches) or W/L (playoffs) to see the match summary.

== League stage ==
12 March
Scorecard

Kolkata Knight Riders; 161/4 (20 overs)	v	Deccan Chargers (H); 150/7 (20 overs)
Angelo Mathews 65* (46); Chaminda Vaas 2/22 (3 overs)		Adam Gilchrist 54 (35); Charl Langeveldt 2/26 (4 overs)

Kolkata won by 11 runs
DY Patil Stadium, Navi Mumbai
Umpires: Rudi Koertzen and Russell Tiffin
Player of the match: Angelo Mathews

- Deccan Chargers won the toss and chose to bowl first.

13 March
Scorecard

(H) Mumbai Indians; 212/6 (20 overs)	v	Rajasthan Royals; 208/7 (20 overs)
Ambati Rayudu 55 (33); Dimitri Mascarenhas 2/34 (4 overs)		Yusuf Pathan 100 (37); Lasith Malinga 2/22 (4 overs)

Mumbai won by 4 runs
Brabourne Stadium, Mumbai
Umpires: Rudi Koertzen and Russell Tiffin
Player of the match: Yusuf Pathan

- Mumbai Indians won the toss and chose to bat first.

13 March
Scorecard

(H) Kings XI Punjab; 142/9 (20 overs)	v	Delhi Daredevils; 146/5 (19.5 overs)
Ravi Bopara 56 (48); Dirk Nannes 2/12 (4 overs)		Gautam Gambhir 72 (54); Sreesanth 2/24 (4 overs)

Delhi won by 5 wickets
Punjab Cricket Association Stadium, Mohali
Umpires: Billy Doctrove and S. Ravi
Player of the match: Gautam Gambhir

- Delhi Daredevils won the toss and chose to bowl first.

14 March
Scorecard

Royal Challengers Bangalore; 135/7 (20 overs)	v	Kolkata Knight Riders (H); 136/3 (19.2 overs)
Jacques Kallis 65* (52); Angelo Mathews 4/19 (4 overs)		Manoj Tiwary 50 (29); Roelof van der Merwe 2/27 (4 overs)

Kolkata won by 7 wickets
Eden Gardens, Kolkata
Umpires: Amiesh Saheba and Kumar Dharmasena
Player of the match: Manoj Tiwary

- Kolkata Knight Riders won the toss and chose to bowl first.

14 March
Scorecard

Deccan Chargers; 190/4 (20 overs)	v	Chennai Super Kings (H); 159/9 (20 overs)
Andrew Symonds 50 (43); Ravichandran Ashwin 1/26 (4 overs)		Albie Morkel 42* (26); Chaminda Vaas 3/21 (4 overs)

Deccan won by 31 runs
M. A. Chidambaram Stadium, Chennai
Umpires: Daryl Harper and K. Hariharan
Player of the match: Chaminda Vaas

- Deccan Chargers won the toss and chose to bat first.

15 March
Scorecard

(H) Rajasthan Royals; 141/6 (20 overs)	v	Delhi Daredevils; 142/4(17.1 overs)
Abhishek Jhunjhunwala 53 (45); Pradeep Sangwan 1/20 (4 overs)		Virender Sehwag 75 (34); Dimitri Mascarenhas 2/31 (4 overs)

Delhi won by 6 wickets
Sardar Patel Stadium, Ahmedabad
Umpires: Rudi Koertzen and Brian Jerling
Player of the match: Virender Sehwag

- Delhi Daredevils won the toss and chose to bowl first.

16 March
Scorecard

Kings XI Punjab; 203/3 (20 overs)	v	Royal Challengers Bangalore (H); 204/2 (18.5 overs)
Ravi Bopara 77 (50); Dale Steyn 1/36 (4 overs)		Jacques Kallis 89* (55); Piyush Chawla 1/20 (3 overs)

Bangalore won by 8 wickets
M Chinnaswamy Stadium, Bangalore
Umpires: Daryl Harper and Subroto Das
Player of the match: Jacques Kallis

- Kings XI Punjab won the toss and chose to bat first.

16 March
Scorecard

Chennai Super Kings; 164/3 (20 overs)	v	Kolkata Knight Riders (H); 109/10 (19.2 overs)
Mahendra Singh Dhoni 66 * (33); Brad Hodge 1/4 (1 over)		Wriddhiman Saha 22 (13); Justin Kemp 3/12 (3 overs)

Chennai won by 55 runs
Eden Gardens, Kolkata
Umpires: Amiesh Saheba and Kumar Dharmasena
Player of the match: Mahendra Singh Dhoni

- Chennai Super Kings won the toss and chose to bat first.

17 March
Scorecard

Mumbai Indians; 218/7 (20 overs)	v	Delhi Daredevils (H); 120 (16.3 overs)
Sachin Tendulkar 63 (32); Sarabjit Ladda 2/44 (4 overs)		Farveez Maharoof 28 (18); Dwayne Bravo 2/11 (2 overs)

Mumbai won by 98 runs
Feroz Shah Kotla, Delhi
Umpires: Billy Doctrove and Shavir Tarapore
Player of the match: Sachin Tendulkar

- Delhi DareDevils won the toss and chose to bowl first.

18 March
Scorecard

Rajasthan Royals; 92 (19.5 overs)	v	Royal Challengers Bangalore (H); 93/0 (10.4 overs)
Yusuf Pathan 26 (24); Anil Kumble 3/9 (3.5 overs)		Jacques Kallis 44* (34); Shane Warne 0/12 (2 overs)

Bangalore won by 10 wickets
M Chinnaswamy Stadium, Bangalore
Umpires: Daryl Harper and K. Hariharan
Player of the match: Jacques Kallis

- Royal Challengers Bangalore won the toss and chose to bowl first.
- Praveen Kumar (RCB) took a hat-trick.

19 March
Scorecard

(H) Delhi Daredevils; 185/6 (20 overs)	v	Chennai Super Kings; 190/5 (19.1 overs)
Virender Sehwag 74 (38); Lakshmipathy Balaji 2/21 (3 overs)		Mathew Hayden 93 (43); Dirk Nannes 1/18 (4 overs)

Chennai won by 5 wickets
Feroz Shah Kotla, Delhi
Umpires: Billy Doctrove and Shavir Tarapore
Player of the match: Mathew Hayden

- Delhi DareDevils won the toss and chose to bat first.

19 March
Scorecard

(H) Deccan Chargers; 170/7 (20 overs)	v	Kings XI Punjab; 164/8 (20 overs)
Andrew Symonds 53 (38); Yuvraj Singh 2/21 (4 overs)		Irfan Pathan 60 (29); Chaminda Vaas 2/27 (4 overs)

Deccan won by 6 runs
Barabati Stadium, Cuttack
Umpires: Billy Bowden and Marais Erasmus
Player of the match: Andrew Symonds

- Kings XI Punjab won the toss and chose to bowl first.

20 March
Scorecard

(H) Rajasthan Royals; 168/7 (20 overs)	v	Kolkata Knight Riders; 134/5 (20 overs)
Abhishek Jhunjhunwala 45 (36); Ashok Dinda 2/28		Brad Hodge 36 (34); Yusuf Pathan 2/23

Rajasthan won by 34 runs
Sardar Patel Stadium, Ahmedabad
Umpires: Rudi Koertzen and Russell Tiffin
Player of the match: Abhishek Jhunjhunwala

- Rajasthan Royals won the toss and chose to bat first.

20 March
Scorecard

(H) Mumbai Indians; 151/9 (20 overs)	v	Royal Challengers Bangalore; 155/3 (19.1 overs)
Saurabh Tiwary 25 (21); Vinay Kumar 3/25 (4 overs)		Jacques Kallis 66* (55); Zaheer Khan 1/18 (4 overs)

Bangalore won by 7 wickets
Brabourne Stadium, Mumbai
Umpires: Kumar Dharmasena and Sanjay Hazare
Player of the match: Jacques Kallis

- Mumbai Indians won the toss and chose to bat first.

21 March
Scorecard

(H) Deccan Chargers; 171/6 (20 overs)	v	Delhi Daredevils; 161/9 (20 overs)
Rohit Sharma 45 (30); Amit Mishra 1/12 (3 overs)		David Warner 57 (33); Andrew Symonds 3/21 (4 overs)

Deccan won by 10 runs
Barabati Stadium, Cuttack
Umpires: Billy Bowden and Marais Erasmus
Player of the match: Andrew Symonds

- Deccan Chargers won the toss and chose to bat first.

21 March
Scorecard

Kings XI Punjab; 136/8 (20 overs)	v	Chennai Super Kings (H); 136/7 (20 overs)
Yuvraj Singh 43 (28); Muttiah Muralitharan 3/16 (4 overs)		Parthiv Patel 57 (58); Juan Theron 2/17 (4 overs)

Punjab won by Super Over
M. A. Chidambaram Stadium, Chennai
Umpires: Daryl Harper and K. Hariharan
Player of the match: Juan Theron

- Chennai Super Kings won the toss and chose to bowl first.

22 March
Scorecard

Kolkata Knight Riders; 155/3 (20 overs)	v	Mumbai Indians (H); 156/3 (18.3 overs)
Chris Gayle 75 (60); Zaheer Khan 2/27 (4 overs)		Sachin Tendulkar 71* (48); Ishant Sharma 2/44 (4 overs)

Mumbai won by 7 wickets
Brabourne Stadium, Mumbai
Umpires: Sanjay Hazare and Simon Taufel
Player of the match: Sachin Tendulkar

- Kolkata Knight Riders won the toss and chose to bat first.

23 March
Scorecard

(H) Royal Challengers Bangalore; 171/5 (20 overs)	v	Chennai Super Kings; 135/7 (20 overs)
Robin Uthappa 68* (38); Muttiah Muralitharan 3/25 (4 overs)		Matthew Hayden 32 (28); Vinay Kumar 4/40 (4 overs)

Bangalore won by 36 runs
M Chinnaswamy Stadium, Bangalore
Umpires: Rudi Koertzen and Russell Tiffin
Player of the match: Robin Uthappa

- Chennai Super Kings won the toss and chose to bowl first.

24 March
Scorecard

Rajasthan Royals; 183/5 (20 overs)	v	Kings XI Punjab (H); 152 (19.1 overs)
Adam Voges 45 (24); Sreesanth 1/20 (3 overs)		Maninder Bisla 35 (18); Shaun Tait 3/22 (3.1 overs)

Rajasthan won by 31 runs
Punjab Cricket Association Stadium, Mohali
Umpires: Billy Doctrove and Shavir Tarapore
Player of the match: Adam Voges

- Kings XI Punjab won the toss and chose to bowl first.

25 March
Scorecard

Delhi Daredevils; 183/4 (20 overs)	v	Royal Challengers Bangalore (H); 166/9 (20 overs)
Kedar Jadhav 50* (29); Vinay Kumar 1/29 (4 overs)		Manish Pandey 39 (29); Amit Mishra 2/23 (4 overs)

Delhi won by 17 runs
M Chinnaswamy Stadium, Bangalore
Umpires: Brian Jerling and Rudi Koertzen
Player of the match: Kedar Jadhav

- Royal Challengers Bangalore won the toss and chose to bowl first.

25 March
Scorecard

Chennai Super Kings; 180/2 (20 overs)	v	Mumbai Indians (H); 181/5 (19 overs)
Suresh Raina 83* (52); Ryan McLaren 1/23 (4 overs)		Sachin Tendulkar 72 (52); Muttiah Muralitharan 2/32 (4 overs)

Mumbai won by 5 wickets
Brabourne Stadium, Mumbai
Umpires: Billy Bowden and Amiesh Saheba
Player of the match: Sachin Tendulkar

- Mumbai Indians won the toss and chose to bowl first.

26 March
Scorecard

Deccan Chargers; 148/9 (20 overs)	v	Rajasthan Royals (H); 151/2 (15.4 overs)
Rohit Sharma 49 (35); Shaun Tait 3/22 (4 overs)		Yusuf Pathan 73* (34); Pragyan Ojha 1/40 (3 overs)

Rajasthan won by 8 wickets
Sardar Patel Stadium, Ahmedabad
Umpires: Simon Taufel and Kumar Dharmasena
Player of the match: Yusuf Pathan

- Deccan Chargers won the toss and chose to bat first.

27 March
Scorecard

Kolkata Knight Riders; 183/5 (20 overs)	v	Kings XI Punjab (H); 144/6 (20 overs)
Manoj Tiwary 75* (47); Shalabh Srivastava 2/23 (3 overs)		Kumar Sangakkara 30 (27); Shane Bond 2/24 (4 overs)

Kolkata won by 39 runs
Punjab Cricket Association Stadium, Mohali
Umpires: Billy Doctrove and S. Ravi
Player of the match: Manoj Tiwary

- Kolkata Knight Riders won the toss and chose to bat first.

28 March
Scorecard

(H) Rajasthan Royals; 177/8 (20 overs)	v	Chennai Super Kings; 160/6 (20 overs)
Naman Ojha 80 (49); Thilan Thushara 2/28 (4 overs)		Murali Vijay 42 (28); Shaun Tait 2/22 (4 overs)

Rajasthan won by 17 runs
Sardar Patel Stadium, Ahmedabad
Umpires: Sanjay Hazare and Simon Taufel
Player of the match: Naman Ojha

- Rajasthan Royals won the toss and chose to bat first.

28 March
Scorecard

Mumbai Indians; 172/7 (20 overs)	v	Deccan Chargers (H); 131 (17.4 overs)
Sachin Tendulkar 55 (43); R. P. Singh 3/31 (4 overs)		Rohit Sharma 45 (28); Lasith Malinga 3/12 (3.4 overs)

Mumbai won by 41 runs
DY Patil Stadium, Mumbai
Umpires: K. Hariharan and Subroto Das
Player of the match: Harbhajan Singh

- Deccan Chargers won the toss and chose to bowl first.

29 March
Scorecard

(H) Delhi Daredevils; 177/4 (20 overs)	v	Kolkata Knight Riders; 137/9 (20 overs)
David Warner 107* (69); Charl Langeveldt 2/35 (3 overs)		Chris Gayle 30 (21); Umesh Yadav 2/27 (4 overs)

Delhi won by 40 runs
Feroz Shah Kotla, Delhi
Umpires: Sanjay Hazare and Simon Taufel
Player of the match: David Warner

- Delhi Daredevils won the toss and chose to bat first.

30 March
Scorecard

Kings XI Punjab; 163 (20 overs)	v	Mumbai Indians (H); 164/6 (19.3 overs)
Shaun Marsh 57 (47); Lasith Malinga 4/22 (4 overs)		Shikhar Dhawan 50 (40); Ravi Bopara 3/31 (4 overs)

Mumbai won by 4 wickets
Brabourne Stadium, Mumbai
Umpires: Billy Doctrove and Shavir Tarapore
Player of the match: Lasith Malinga

- Mumbai Indians won the toss and chose to bowl first.

31 March
Scorecard

Royal Challengers Bangalore; 161/4 (20 overs)	v	Chennai Super Kings (H); 162/5 (19 overs)
Jacques Kallis 52 (49); Shadab Jakati 2/17 (4 overs)		Murali Vijay 78 (39); Anil Kumble 1/16 (4 overs)

Chennai won by 5 wickets
M. A. Chidambaram Stadium, Chennai
Umpires: Brian Jerling and Rudi Koertzen
Player of the match: Murali Vijay

- Royal Challengers won the toss and chose to bat first.

31 March
Scorecard

(H) Delhi Daredevils; 188/6 (20 overs)	v	Rajasthan Royals; 121 (17.4 overs)
Dinesh Karthik 69 (38); Sumit Narwal 3/36 (4 overs)		Naman Ojha 27 (14); Amit Mishra 3/25 (4 overs)

Delhi won by 67 runs
Feroz Shah Kotla, Delhi
Umpires: Kumar Dharmasena and Simon Taufel
Player of the match: Dinesh Karthik

- Delhi Daredevils won the toss and chose to bat first.

1 April
Scorecard

(H) Kolkata Knight Riders; 181/6 (20 overs)	v	Deccan Chargers; 157/5 (20 overs)
Sourav Ganguly 88 (54); Jaskaran Singh 2/18 (3 overs)		Herschelle Gibbs 50 (45); Chris Gayle 1/9 (1 over)

Kolkata won by 24 runs
Eden Gardens, Kolkata
Umpires: Daryl Harper and K. Hariharan
Player of the match: Saurav Ganguly

- Kolkata Knight Riders won the toss and chose to bat first.

2 April
Scorecard

(H) Kings XI Punjab; 181/5 (20 overs)	v	Royal Challengers Bangalore; 184/4 (19.1 overs)
Kumar Sangakkara 45 (27); Vinay Kumar 1/24 (3 overs)		Kevin Pietersen 66* (44); Shalabh Srivastava 1/21 (2 overs)

Bangalore won by 6 wickets
Punjab Cricket Association Stadium, Mohali
Umpires: Billy Bowden and Marais Erasmus
Player of the match: Kevin Pietersen

- Kings XI Punjab won the toss and chose to bat first.

3 April
Scorecard

(H) Chennai Super Kings; 246/5 (20 overs)	v	Rajasthan Royals; 223/5 (20 overs)
Murali Vijay 127 (56); Shane Watson 2/47 (4 overs)		Naman Ojha 94* (55); Doug Bollinger 2/15 (4 overs)

Chennai won by 23 runs
M. A. Chidambaram Stadium, Chennai
Umpires: Rudi Koertzen and Russell Tiffin
Player of the match: Murali Vijay

- Chennai Super Kings won the toss and chose to bat first.

3 April
Scorecard

(H) Mumbai Indians; 178/5 (20 overs)	v	Deccan Chargers; 115 (18.2 overs)
Ambati Rayudu 55* (29); Pragyan Ojha 3/26 (4 overs)		Andrew Symonds 21(18); Zaheer Khan 2/10 (2 overs)

Mumbai won by 63 runs
Brabourne Stadium, Mumbai
Umpires: Billy Doctrove and S. Ravi
Player of the match: Ambati Rayudu

- Mumbai Indians won the toss and chose to bat first.

4 April
Scorecard

(H) Kolkata Knight Riders; 200/3 (20 overs)	v	Kings XI Punjab; 204/2 (18.2 overs)
Chris Gayle 88 (42); Juan Theron/Irfan Pathan 1/36 (4 overs)		Mahela Jayawardene 110* (59); Shane Bond 1/32 (4 overs)

Punjab won by 8 wickets
Eden Gardens, Kolkata
Umpires: Daryl Harper and Sudhir Asnani
Player of the match: Mahela Jayawardene

- Kolkata Knight Riders won the toss and chose to bat first.

4 April
Scorecard

(H) Delhi Daredevils; 184/5 (20 overs)	v	Royal Challengers Bangalore; 147/9 (20 overs)
Paul Collingwood 75* (46); Kotragada Appanna 2/24 (4 overs)		Jacques Kallis 54* (42); Pradeep Sangwan 3/22 (4 overs)

Delhi won by 37 runs
Feroz Shah Kotla, Delhi
Umpires: Billy Bowden and Marais Erasmus
Player of the match: Paul Collingwood

- Delhi Daredevils won the toss and chose to bat first.

5 April
Scorecard

Rajasthan Royals; 159 (19.5 overs)	v	Deccan Chargers (H); 157 (19.5 overs)
Shane Watson 58 (36); R. P. Singh 3/17 (4 overs)		Rohit Sharma 73 (44); Shane Warne 4/21 (4 overs)

Rajasthan won by 2 runs
Vidarbha Cricket Association Stadium, Jamtha, Nagpur
Umpires: Kumar Dharmasena and Simon Taufel
Player of the match: Shane Warne

- Rajasthan Royals won the toss and elected to bat first.

6 April
Scorecard

(H) Chennai Super Kings; 165/4 (20 overs)	v	Mumbai Indians; 141/9 (20 overs)
Matthew Hayden 35 (31); Kieron Pollard 2/27 (4 overs)		Sachin Tendulkar 45 (35); Ravichandran Ashwin 2/22 (4 overs)

Chennai won by 24 runs
M. A. Chidambaram Stadium, Chennai
Umpires: Daryl Harper and Sudhir Asnani
Player of the match: Suresh Raina

- Chennai Super Kings won the toss and elected to bat first.

7 April
Scorecard

Kings XI Punjab; 153/6 (20 overs)	v	Rajasthan Royals (H); 157/1 (15 overs)
Mahela Jayawardene 44 (33); Siddharth Trivedi 2/22 (4 overs)		Michael Lumb 83 (43); Ravi Bopara 1/18 (2 overs)

Rajasthan won by 9 wickets
Sawai Mansingh Stadium, Jaipur
Umpires: S. Ravi and Shavir Tarapore
Player of the match: Michael Lumb

- Kings XI Punjab won the toss an elected to bat first.

7 April
Scorecard

(H) Kolkata Knight Riders; 181/3 (20 overs)	v	Delhi Daredevils; 167/8 (20 overs)
Sourav Ganguly 56 (46); Vettori, Bhatia 1/30 (4 overs)		Virender Sehwag 64 (40); Ashok Dinda 2/21 (4 overs)

Kolkata won by 14 runs
Eden Gardens, Kolkata
Umpires: Rudi Koertzen and Brian Jerling
Player of the match: Sourav Ganguly

- Kolkata Knight Riders won the toss and elected to bat first.

8 April
Scorecard

(H) Royal Challengers Bangalore; 184/6 (20 overs)	v	Deccan Chargers; 186/3 (19.2 overs)
Jacques Kallis 68 (44); Pragyan Ojha 2/24 (4 overs)		Tirumalasetti Suman 78* (57); Praveen Kumar 1/37 (4 overs)

Deccan won by 7 wickets
M Chinnaswamy Stadium, Bangalore
Umpires: Daryl Harper and Sudhir Asnani
Player of the match: Tirumalasetti Suman

- Deccan Chargers won the toss and chose to bowl first.

9 April
Scorecard

Mumbai Indians; 154/9 (20 overs)	v	Kings XI Punjab (H); 158/4 (19.2 overs)
Jean-Paul Duminy 34 (28); Piyush Chawla 3/24 (4 overs)		Kumar Sangakkara 56 (42); Lasith Malinga 2/36 (4 overs)

Punjab won by 6 wickets
Punjab Cricket Association Stadium, Mohali
Umpires: Marais Erasmus and Amiesh Saheba
Player of the match: Kumar Sangakkara

- Mumbai Indians won the toss and elected to bat first.

10 April
Scorecard

Chennai Super Kings; 138/8 (20 overs)	v	Deccan Chargers (H); 139/4 (19.1 overs)
Suresh Raina 52 (42); Ryan Harris 3/18 (4 overs)		Tirumalasetti Suman 55 (44); Ravichandran Ashwin 2/13 (4 overs)

Deccan won by 6 wickets
Vidarbha Cricket Association Stadium, Jamtha, Nagpur
Umpires: Kumar Dharmasena and Simon Taufel
Player of the match: Ryan Harris

- Chennai Super Kings won the toss and elected to bat first.

10 April
Scorecard

Kolkata Knight Riders; 160/9 (20 overs)	v	Royal Challengers Bangalore (H); 162/3 (17.1 overs)
Brendon McCullum 45 (36); Vinay Kumar 3/23 (3 overs)		Rahul Dravid 52 (35); Ashok Dinda 2/15 (3.1 overs)

Bangalore won by 7 wickets
M Chinnaswamy Stadium, Bangalore
Umpires: K. Hariharan and Daryl Harper
Player of the match: Vinay Kumar

- Royal Challengers Bangalore won the toss and elected to bowl first.

11 April
Scorecard

(H) Delhi Daredevils; 111 (19.4 overs)	v	Kings XI Punjab; 112/3 (18.4 overs)
Gautam Gambhir 26 (12); Irfan Pathan 3/24 (3.4 overs)		Mahela Jayawardene 38 (35); Paul Collingwood 2/19 (4 overs)

Punjab won by 7 wickets
Feroz Shah Kotla, Delhi
Umpires: Billy Bowden and Amiesh Saheba
Player of the match: Piyush Chawla

- Delhi Daredevils won the toss and chose to bat first.

11 April
Scorecard

Mumbai Indians; 174/5 (20 overs)	v	Rajasthan Royals (H); 137/8 (20 overs)
Sachin Tendulkar 89* (59); Shane Watson 3/37 (4 overs)		Aditya Dole 30 (18); Zaheer Khan 2/17 (4 overs)

Mumbai won by 37 runs
Sawai Mansingh Stadium, Jaipur
Umpires: Billy Doctrove and Shavir Tarapore
Player of the match: Sachin Tendulkar

- Rajasthan Royals won the toss and chose to bowl first.

12 April
Scorecard

(H) Deccan Chargers; 151/6 (20 overs)	v	Royal Challengers Bangalore; 138 (19.4 overs)
Rohit Sharma 51 (46); Dale Steyn 3/18 (4 overs)		Rahul Dravid 49 (35); R. P. Singh 2/21 (4 overs)

Deccan won by 13 runs
Vidarbha Cricket Association Stadium, Jamtha, Nagpur
Umpires: Rudi Koertzen and Russell Tiffin
Player of the match: Harmeet Singh

- Royal Challengers Bangalore won the toss and elected to bowl first.

13 April
Scorecard

(H) Mumbai Indians; 183/4 (20 overs)	v	Delhi Daredevils; 144/7 (20 overs)
Kieron Pollard 45* (13); Pradeep Sangwan 2/35 (4 overs)		Andrew McDonald 33* (31); Ali Murtaza 2/18 (4 overs)

Mumbai won by 39 runs
Brabourne Stadium, Mumbai
Umpires: Sudhir Asnani and Daryl Harper
Player of the match: Kieron Pollard

- Mumbai Indians won the toss and chose to bat first.
- Mumbai Indians qualified for playoffs as a result of this match.

13 April
Scorecard

Kolkata Knight Riders; 139/8 (20 overs)	v	Chennai Super Kings (H); 143/1 (13.3 overs)
Angelo Mathews 48 (48); Ravichandran Ashwin 3/16 (4 overs)		Suresh Raina 78* (39); Chris Gayle 1/35 (3 overs)

Chennai won by 9 wickets
M. A. Chidambaram Stadium, Chennai
Umpires: Sanjay Hazare and Simon Taufel
Player of the match: Ravichandran Ashwin

- Kolkata Knight Riders won the toss and chose to bat first.

14 April
Scorecard

(H) Rajasthan Royals; 130/6 (20 overs)	v	Royal Challengers Bangalore; 132/5 (15.4 overs)
Abhishek Raut 32* (20); Pankaj Singh 2/27 (4 overs)		Kevin Pietersen 62 (29); Siddharth Trivedi 2/32 (3.4 overs)

Bangalore won by 5 wickets
Sawai Mansingh Stadium, Jaipur
Umpires: Billy Doctrove and S. Ravi
Player of the match: Kevin Pietersen

- Rajasthan Royals won the toss and elected to bat first

15 April
Scorecard

(H) Chennai Super Kings; 112/9 (20 overs)	v	Delhi Daredevils; 113/4 (18.4 overs)
Subramaniam Badrinath 30 (29); Ashish Nehra 3/26 (4 overs)		Gautam Gambhir 57* (56); Doug Bollinger 2/24 (4 overs)

Delhi won by 6 wickets
M. A. Chidambaram Stadium, Chennai
Umpires: Kumar Dharmasena and Sanjay Hazare
Player of the match: Gautam Gambhir

- Chennai Super Kings won the toss and elected to bat first

16 April
Scorecard

(H) Kings XI Punjab; 174/3 (20 overs)	v	Deccan Chargers; 178/5 (19.1 overs)
Mahela Jayawardene 93* (62); Ryan Harris 1/27 (4 overs)		Rohit Sharma 68* (38); Piyush Chawla 1/24 (4 overs)

Deccan won by 5 wickets
HPCA Cricket Stadium, Dharamsala
Umpires: Amiesh Saheba and Marais Erasmus
Player of the match: Rohit Sharma

- Deccan Chargers won the toss and elected to field
- Kings XI Punjab were eliminated as a result of the match.

17 April
Scorecard

Mumbai Indians; 191/4 (20 overs)	v	Royal Challengers Bangalore (H); 134/9 (20 overs)
Jean-Paul Duminy 42* (19); Jacques Kallis 2/41 (4 overs)		Virat Kohli 37 (24); Kieron Pollard 3/28 (4 overs)

Mumbai won by 57 runs
M Chinnaswamy Stadium, Bangalore
Umpires: Kumar Dharmasena and Simon Taufel
Player of the match: Ryan McLaren

- Royal Challengers Bangalore won the toss and elected to bowl first

17 April
Scorecard

Rajasthan Royals; 132/9 (20 overs)	v	Kolkata Knight Riders (H); 133/2 (16.1 overs)
Shane Watson 44 (26); Jaydev Unadkat 3/26 (4 overs)		Sourav Ganguly 75* (50); Kamran Khan 2/13 (2 overs)

Kolkata won by 8 wickets
Eden Gardens, Kolkata
Umpires: Brian Jerling and Russell Tiffin
Player of the match: Jaydev Unadkat

- Rajasthan Royals won the toss and elected to bat
- Rajasthan Royals were eliminated as a result of the match.

18 April
Scorecard

(H) Kings XI Punjab; 192/3 (20 overs)	v	Chennai Super Kings; 195/4 (19.4 overs)
Shaun Marsh 88* (57); Ravichandran Ashwin 1/20 (4 overs)		Mahendra Singh Dhoni 54* (29); Ramesh Powar 2/28 (4 overs)

Chennai won by 6 wickets
HPCA Cricket Stadium, Dharamsala
Umpires: Billy Bowden and Amiesh Saheba
Player of the match: Mahendra Singh Dhoni

- Chennai Super Kings won the toss and elected to field
- Chennai Super Kings qualified for playoffs

18 April
Scorecard

Deccan Chargers; 145/7 (20 overs)	v	Delhi Daredevils (H); 134/7 (20 overs)
Andrew Symonds 54 (30); Umesh Yadav 2/24 (4 overs)		Paul Collingwood 51* (42); Pragyan Ojha 2/16 (4 overs)

Deccan won by 11 runs
Feroz Shah Kotla, Delhi
Umpires: Billy Doctrove and Shavir Tarapore
Player of the match: Andrew Symonds

- Deccan Chargers won the toss and elected to bat
- Deccan Chargers qualified for the playoffs, and Delhi Daredevils were eliminated as a result of the match.

19 April
Scorecard

Mumbai Indians; 133/8 (20 overs)	v	Kolkata Knight Riders (H); 135/1 (17.3 overs)
Saurabh Tiwary 46 (37); Murali Kartik 2/20 (4 overs)		Brendon McCullum 57* (56); Rajagopal Sathish 1/11 (2 overs)

Kolkata won by 9 wickets
Eden Gardens, Kolkata
Umpires: Brian Jerling and Rudi Koertzen
Player of the match: Murali Kartik

- Mumbai Indians won the toss and elected to bat
- Royal Challengers Bangalore qualified for playoffs, and Kolkata Knight Riders were eliminated as a result of the match.

== Playoffs ==
Semi-finals
21 April 2010 — DY Patil Stadium, Navi Mumbai
1	Mumbai Indians	184/5 (20 overs)
4	Royal Challengers Bangalore	149/9 (20 overs)
22 April 2010 — DY Patil Stadium, Navi Mumbai
3	Chennai Super Kings	142/7 (20 overs)
2	Deccan Chargers	104 (19.2 overs)

Final
25 April 2010 — DY Patil Stadium, Navi Mumbai
SF1W	Mumbai Indians	146/9 (20 overs)
SF2W	Chennai Super Kings	168/5 (20 overs)

=== Semi-final 1 ===
21 April 2010
Scorecard

Mumbai Indians; 184/5 (20 overs)	v	Royal Challengers Bangalore; 149/9 (20 overs)
Saurabh Tiwary 52* (31); Dale Steyn 2/43 (4 overs)		Ross Taylor 31* (30); Kieron Pollard 3/17 (4 overs)

Mumbai won by 35 runs
DY Patil Stadium, Navi Mumbai
Umpires: Billy Doctrove and Russell Tiffin
Player of the match: Kieron Pollard (Mumbai)

- Mumbai Indians won the toss and elected to bat

=== Semi-final 2 ===
22 April 2010
Scorecard

Chennai Super Kings; 142/7 (20 overs)	v	Deccan Chargers; 104/10 (19.2 overs)
S Badrinath 37 (41); Ryan Harris 3/29 (4 overs)		Andrew Symonds 23 (22); Doug Bollinger 4/13 (4 overs)

Chennai won by 38 runs
DY Patil Stadium, Navi Mumbai
Umpires: Billy Doctrove and Russell Tiffin
Player of the match: Doug Bollinger (Chennai)

- Chennai Super Kings won the toss and elected to bat

=== Third place playoff ===
24 April 2010
Scorecard

Deccan Chargers; 82/10 (18.3 overs)	v	Royal Challengers Bangalore; 86/1 (13.5 overs)
Anirudh Singh 40 (39); Anil Kumble 4/16 (3.3 overs)		Rahul Dravid 35* (30); Rahul Sharma 1/24 (3 overs)

Bangalore won by 9 wickets
DY Patil Stadium, Navi Mumbai
Umpires: Rudi Koertzen and Simon Taufel
Player of the match: Anil Kumble (Bangalore)

- Deccan Chargers won the toss and elected to bat

=== Final ===
25 April 2010
Scorecard

Chennai Super Kings; 168/5 (20 overs)	v	Mumbai Indians; 146/9 (20 overs)
Suresh Raina 57* (35); Dilhara Fernando 2/23 (4 overs)		Sachin Tendulkar 48 (45); Shadab Jakati 2/26 (3 overs)

Chennai won by 22 runs
DY Patil Stadium, Navi Mumbai
Umpires: Rudi Koertzen and Simon Taufel
Player of the match: Suresh Raina (Chennai)

- Chennai Super Kings won the toss and elected to bat

== Statistics ==
=== Most runs ===
Player	Team	Mat	Inns	Runs	HS
Sachin Tendulkar	Mumbai Indians	15	15	618	89*
Jacques Kallis	Royal Challengers Bangalore	16	16	572	89*
Suresh Raina	Chennai Super Kings	16	16	520	83*
Sourav Ganguly	Kolkata Knight Riders	14	14	493	88
Murali Vijay	Chennai Super Kings	15	15	458	127

The leading run scorer of the league phase wore an orange cap when fielding.

Full Table on ESPNcricinfo

=== Bowling ===
==== Most wickets ====
Player	Team	Mat	Wkts	BBI
Pragyan Ojha	Deccan Chargers	16	21	3/26
Amit Mishra	Delhi Daredevils	14	17	3/25
Harbhajan Singh	Mumbai Indians	15	17	3/31
Anil Kumble	Royal Challengers Bangalore	16	17	4/16
Vinay Kumar	Royal Challengers Bangalore	14	16	4/40

The leading wicket taker of the league phase wore a purple cap when fielding.

Full Table on ESPNcricinfo
