= List of 2010 Indian Premier League personnel changes =

This is a list of all personnel changes for the 2010 Indian Premier League (IPL).

== Auction ==
The player auction was held on 19 January 2010 in Mumbai, India. 97 players from cricket-playing countries other than India registered for the auction. The list of players was then shortlisted by the franchises to 66 players.

=== Sold players ===
Player	Franchise	Sold price (USD)	Base price (USD)
Shane Bond^{†}	Kolkata Knight Riders	750,000	100,000
Kieron Pollard^{†}	Mumbai Indians	750,000	200,000
Kemar Roach	Deccan Chargers	720,000	100,000
Wayne Parnell	Delhi Daredevils	610,000	200,000
Mohammad Kaif	Kings XI Punjab	250,000	100,000
Eoin Morgan	Royal Challengers Bangalore	220,000	200,000
Damien Martyn	Rajasthan Royals	100,000	100,000
Justin Kemp	Chennai Super Kings	100,000	100,000
Thissara Perera	Chennai Super Kings	50,000	50,000
Adam Voges	Rajasthan Royals	50,000	50,000
Yusuf Abdulla	Kings XI Punjab	50,000	50,000

^{†} In the tiebreakers, Kolkata Knight Riders bid $1,300,000 for Shane Bond and Mumbai Indians bid $2,750,000 for Kieron Pollard. The players' take was capped at $750,000 each by the IPL auction rules, with the rest going to IPL kitty.

== Under-19 players ==
Three Indian under-19 players, priced at ₹800,000, were eligible to play in the competition and they were chosen by a draft system.

Player	Team
Harmeet Singh	Deccan Chargers
Harshal Patel	Mumbai Indians

== Trades ==
The trade window was open from 15 December 2009, to 5 January 2010.

Date	Trade		Ref
5 January 2010	To Delhi Daredevils: Moisés Henriques	To Kolkata Knight Riders: Owais Shah; Manoj Tiwary	
