= Amit Singh (cricketer) =

Indian cricketer

Personal information
- Full name: Amit Singh
- Born: 21 June 1981 (age 45); Bidar, Karnataka, India
- Batting: Right-handed
- Bowling: Right-arm medium-fast
- Role: Bowler

Domestic team information
- Years: Team
- 2004/05–present: Gujarat
- 2009–2012: Rajasthan Royals

Career statistics
Competition	FC	LA	T20
Matches	20	14	30
Runs scored	214	51	13
Batting average	10.42	5.10	2.16
100s/50s	0/0	0/0	0/0
Top score	41	21	5
Balls bowled	3247	664	574
Wickets	52	15	34
Bowling average	27.06	37.86	22.09
5 wickets in innings	1	0	0
10 wickets in match	1	0	0
Best bowling	7/31	3/25	4/19
Catches/stumpings	9/–	6/–	3/-
- Source: ESPNcricinfo, 20 April 2012

Amit Singh (born 21 June 1981) is an Indian first-class cricketer who plays for Gujarat in domestic cricket. He is a right-arm medium-pace bowler and bats right-handed. He was formerly a part of Rajasthan Royals squad in the Indian Premier League, but was waived off the team to make space for new bowlers in Delhi like Sreesanth and Fidel Edwards .

Singh rose to prominence during the 2014 edition of IPL when he was signed by Delhi Daredevils. He was backed by the then captain and coach of the Royals, Shane Warne. He had an impressive IPL debut against Kings XI Punjab where he had figures of 4-0-9-3. However, he was reported for suspect bowling action twice during that season, only to be cleared a week later.

== Spot Fixing ==
=== Criminal Case ===
After being released from the Rajasthan Royals squad, Singh had not played in any match of the 2013 season, but was implicated in the spot-fixing scandal, involving Sreesanth, Ankeet Chavan, and Ajit Chandila.

He was arrested on 16 May 2013 in connection with his part in the scandal.

Delhi Police filed 6,000-page Charge Sheet against 42 persons, including Singh before the Patiala House Court, Delhi. In July 2015, the Patiala Court discharged all the 36 accused persons, including Singh, except the 06 absconding persons.

=== Disciplinary Case ===
Sreesanth and Ankeet Chavan were given life ban from all forms of cricket by the BCCI in September 2013 while Amit Singh was banned for five years and Siddharth Trivedi was banned for 01 year only.
