= Monish Parmar =

Indian cricketer (born 1988)

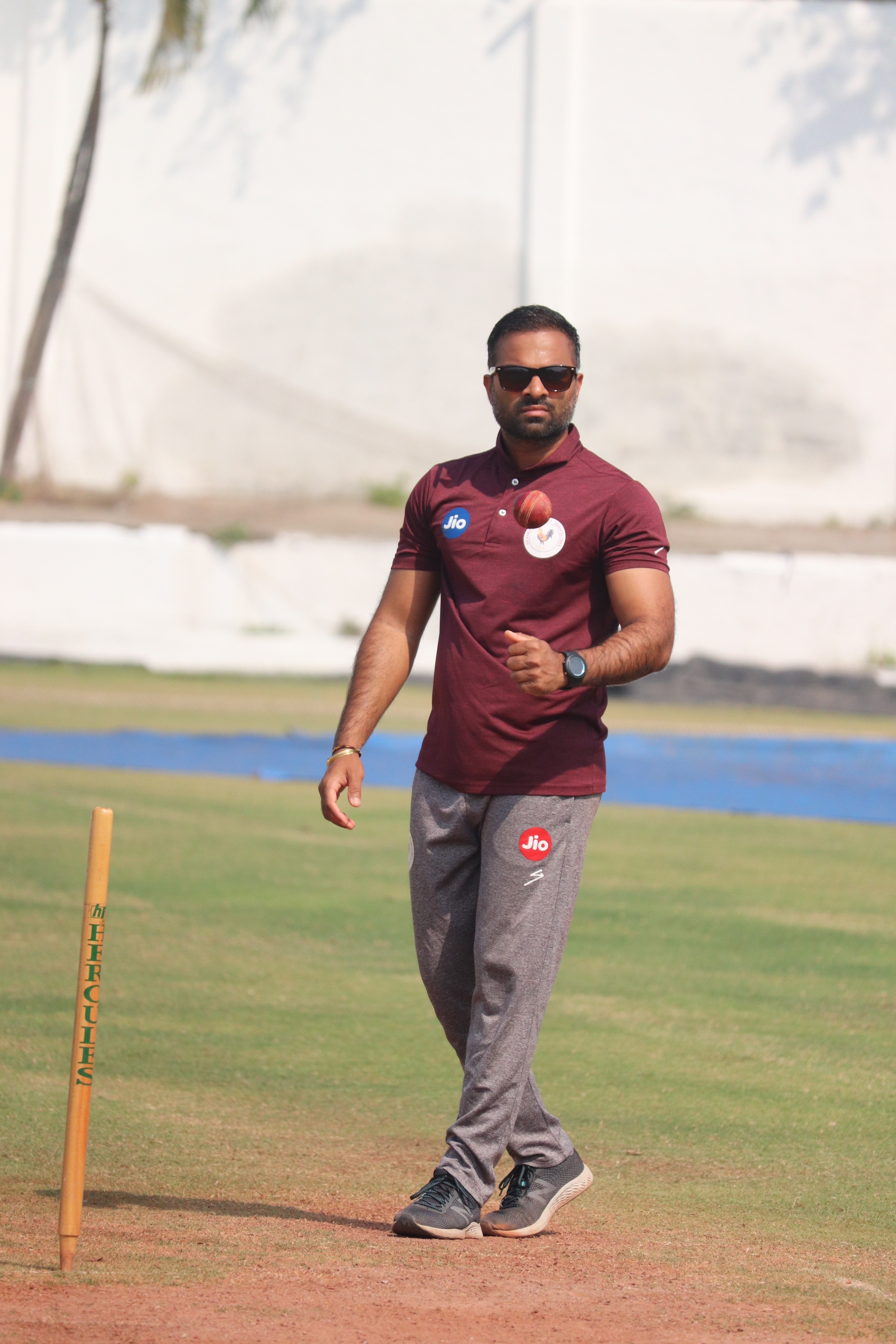
Mohnish Parmar at GCA

Mohnish Bipinbhai Parmar (born 12 April 1988 in Baroda, Gujarat) and presently living in Gandhinagar, Gujarat is a right-arm off-break spin bowler from India. He played for India Under-19s [cricket] team and played for the Gujarat cricket team. He was picked by the Kolkata Knight Riders franchise in 2009. He has modelled his action on the great Sri Lankan off-spinner Muttiah Muralitharan.

Achievements (National & International Cricket):

Selected and Played Following International Cricket Tournaments.

KOLKATTA KNIGHT RIDERS in IPL Session – 3 (April 2009–10)

INDIA-A against AUSTRALIA-A in September 2008–09.

INDIA-A against NEW ZEALAND-A in September 2008–09

INDIA-A against ISRAEL in July 2008–09

INDIA U-19 in ICC CRICKET WORLD CUP 2005–06

Represented Gujarat Cricket Association in BCCI's following First Class Test Cricket Tournaments..

Ranji Trophy Test Matches (4 Days) from 2007 to 2011 (Total 17 Test Matches)

Represented Gujarat Cricket Association in BCCI's following List A One Day Cricket Tournaments..

NKP Salve Challenger Trophy from INDIA RED in 2008-09 ( 3 Matches)

Deodhar Trophy in 2007–08

Vijay Hazare Trophy from 2005 to 2012 ( 8 Matches)

Represented Gujarat Cricket Association in BCCI's following Twenty-20 Matches..

Syed Mushtaq Ali Trophy from 2006 to 2012 ( 6 Matches)

Attended following BCCI's Cricket Camps..

National Cricket Academy Camp (N.C.A) in 2006–07

Zonal Cricket Academy Camp (Z.C.A) from 2003 to 2007 ( 4 times)

Represented Gujarat Cricket Association in BCCI's following State Level around 87 Matches...

Under – 14 (Polly Umrigar Trophy)

Under -15 (Polly Umrigar Trophy)

Under – 17 (Vijay Merchant Trophy)

Under - 19 ( Cooch Behar Trophy, Vinoo Makad Trophy)

Under – 22 (CK Nayudu Trophy)

KSCA All India Invitation Tournament

Buchi Babu Invitation Tournament

G1 Reliance One Day Cricket Tournament

Kenya Tri-Series Tournament
