= Aditya Dole =

Indian cricketer (born 1987)

Aditya Pradip Dole
Personal information
- Born: 9 October 1987 (age 39); Pimpri, Maharashtra
- Batting: Right-handed
- Bowling: Right-arm medium-fast

Domestic team information
- Years: Team
- 2010: Rajasthan Royals
- Source: ESPNcricinfo, 6 June 2018

Aditya Dole (born 9 October 1987) is an Indian former cricketer. He played the different formats of first-class cricket, List A cricket and T20 for the Maharashtra cricket team and Rajasthan Royals from 2006 to 2010.
