= Dirk Nannes =

Australian cricketer (born 1976)

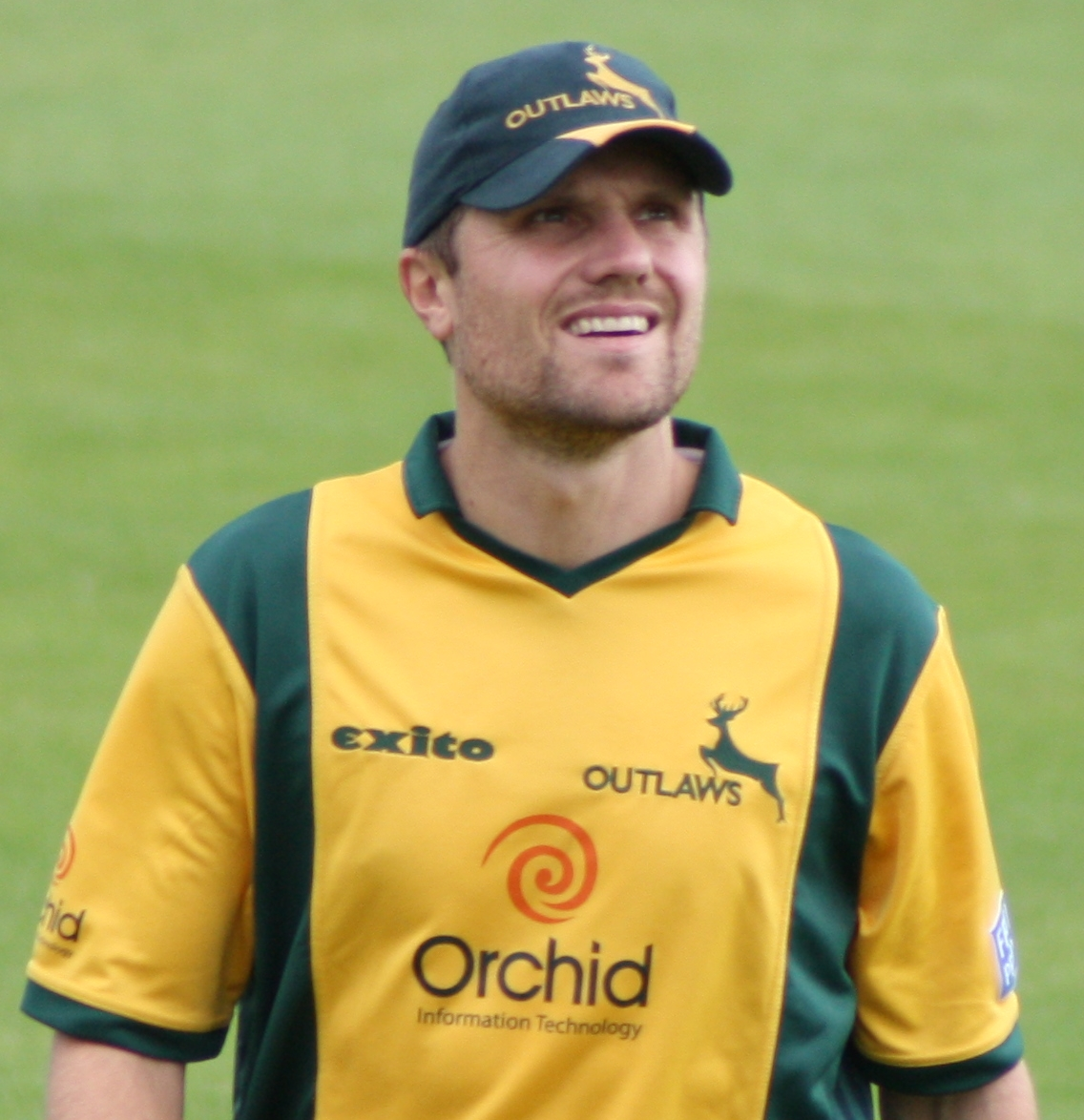

Personal information
- Full name: Dirk Peter Nannes
- Born: 16 May 1976 (age 50); Mount Waverley, Victoria, Australia
- Nickname: Diggler
- Height: 188 cm (6 ft 2 in)
- Batting: Right-handed
- Bowling: Left-arm fast-medium
- Role: Bowler

International information
- National sides: Netherlands (2009); Australia (2009–2010)
- Only ODI (cap 177): 28 August 2009; Australia v Scotland
- T20I debut (cap 15/40): 5 June 2009; Netherlands v England
- Last T20I: 31 October 2010; Australia v Sri Lanka

Domestic team information
- Years: Team
- 2005/06–2010/11: Victoria
- 2008: Middlesex
- 2009–2010: Delhi Capitals
- 2010: Nottinghamshire
- 2010/11–2012/13: Canterbury
- 2011: Royal Challengers Bangalore
- 2011–2012: Surrey
- 2011/12: Mountaineers
- 2011/12: Melbourne Renegades
- 2011/12–2012/13: Highveld Lions
- 2012: Basnahira Cricket Dundee
- 2012/13–2014/15: Sydney Thunder
- 2013: Sylhet Strikers
- 2013: Chennai Super Kings
- 2014: Somerset
- 2014/15: Otago

Career statistics
Competition	ODI	T20I	FC	LA
Matches	1	17	23	32
Runs scored	1	22	108	18
Batting average	1.00	11.00	6.75	3.60
100s/50s	0/0	0/0	0/0	0/0
Top score	1	12*	31*	5*
Balls bowled	42	366	4,139	1,737
Wickets	1	28	93	47
Bowling average	20.00	16.39	25.02	29.70
5 wickets in innings	0	0	2	0
10 wickets in match	0	0	1	0
Best bowling	1/20	4/18	7/50	4/38
Catches/stumpings	0/–	1/–	7/–	2/–
- Source: CricketArchive, 10 December 2016

Dirk Peter Nannes (born 16 May 1976) is an Australian-Dutch cricket commentator and former cricketer who has played internationally for both Australia and the Netherlands, one of the few players to represent multiple international teams.

From Melbourne, Nannes was a freestyle skier before beginning his cricket career, and competed in mogul events at two FIS Freestyle Skiing World Cups. Beginning in Victorian Premier Cricket, he made his first-class debut for Victoria during the 2005–06 season, aged 29. A left-arm fast bowler, he had the ability to bowl at speeds of 150 km/h. Nannes had moderate success in the domestic first-class and one-day tournaments, leading to a stint with English county side Middlesex during the 2008 season. His greatest success, however, came in Twenty20 matches. Holding Dutch citizenship through his parents, he played two Twenty20 Internationals (T20Is) for the Netherlands at the 2009 ICC World Twenty20 tournament, and later that year made his One Day International (ODI) and T20I debuts for Australia.

Altogether, Nannes took 28 wickets in 17 T20I matches, with his last match coming in October 2010, for Australia against Sri Lanka. Although his last matches for Victoria came during the 2010–11 season, he has remained a regular player at the Twenty20 level, in both Australian and overseas tournaments. As one of the first freelance cricketers, Nannes has played for fifteen different teams or franchises across nine different countries, including the Melbourne Renegades and Sydney Thunder in Big Bash League matches, and the Delhi Daredevils, Royal Challengers Bangalore, and Chennai Super Kings in Indian Premier League (IPL) matches. As of August 2014, he had taken almost 250 wickets from 200 Twenty20 matches, ranking only behind Lasith Malinga and Alfonso Thomas in terms of wickets taken in that format.

== Early career ==
Nannes was previously a skier. In 1995, he made his debut as a mogul skier, and went on to compete at FIS Freestyle Skiing World Cup events until 1999. He then turned to playing cricket for club side Hawthorn-Waverley and later Fitzroy Doncaster.

== Progression to first-class cricket ==
Nannes was eventually called up to the Victorian Bushrangers side in early 2006, where he made his first-class and List A debuts. In his second first-class cricket game he played in the 2005/06 Pura Cup final in which the Queensland Bulls amassed a record 6 for 900 declared. Nannes took three wickets in the innings and when it came Victoria's time to bat he was the last wicket to fall in the match.

He signed for Middlesex during the 2008 English Domestic season, qualifying as a non-overseas player due to his Dutch passport. Nannes struggled with injury during that season but was a member of Middlesex's Twenty20 triumph, and took 20 wickets at 19, including a haul of 6/32 in the county championship.

In the 2008 Sheffield Shield, Nannes took his career best figures of 7/50. In his first innings against Western Australia in Perth, he produced highly unusual innings figures of 1/2 off 0.1 overs, bowling a wicket then two beamers in succession and being banned from bowling for the remainder of the innings.

In February 2010 Dirk Nannes retired from first class cricket. He said, "Having been able to play just one game in the longer format this season due to injury, this decision will allow me to concentrate on 50 over and Twenty20 cricket and extend my career with Victoria and Australia".

He played for Delhi Daredevils in the IPL II and III, where he led the bowling attack. The team kept Glenn McGrath on the benches to play him. But in the auctions for IPL IV, he was purchased by Royal Challengers Bangalore for $650,000, where he was expected to open the bowling along with Zaheer Khan. After a couple of matches Nannes sustained a side strain and was ruled out of the IPL; he was later replaced by Chris Gayle.

In 2010, Nannes played for Nottinghamshire in the revamped domestic T20 tournament in England.

In 2013, Nannes played IPL for the Chennai Super Kings.

In July 2012, Nannes signed a one-year deal with cricket club the Sydney Thunder.

Sylhet Royals of the Bangladesh Premier League signed Nannes to play for the 2013 BPL season.

On 26 April 2014, Nannes signed for English county Somerset for their entire T20 season.

== International career ==
=== Netherlands ===
On 11 November 2008, it was announced that Nannes was selected for the Netherlands cricket squad to play the ICC World Cup Qualifier tournament in South Africa. However Nannes subsequently signed with the Delhi Daredevils for the 2009 IPL season, which was to be played in April at the same time as the ICC Trophy causing him to withdraw from The Netherlands squad.

Victoria and Delhi Daredevils coach Greg Shipperd, when asked about Dirk's non selection for the Australian Twenty20 team, said that "I would have thought he would be first pick". Following this omission from the Australian team, Nannes now confirmed his allegiance to the land of his parents. He made his international debut for The Netherlands in the first match of the 2009 ICC World Twenty20, opening the bowling in their surprise win over England.

=== Australia ===
Nannes was called up to the Australian T20I team in August 2009, just two months after making his debut for the Netherlands. A one-day international debut followed that same month where Nannes picked up 1/20 against Scotland. Nannes played for Australia in the 2010 ICC World Twenty20 in the West Indies; Nannes played against Pakistan on 2 May 2010 at St Lucia and he took 3 wickets for 41 runs in his allocated overs, he was unbeaten batting for 0 runs facing one ball. He also played against Bangladesh on 5 May at Barbados and he took 4 wickets for 18 runs in his allocated overs, he did not bat. He bagged the highest number of wickets in the T20 World Cup in 2010 with 14 wickets at 13.07.

== Commentary ==
Since 2015, Nannes has been a member of ABC Grandstand's cricket commentary team.

Drawing upon his experience as a former professional skier, Nannes provided commentary for the Seven Network's coverage of the 2018 Winter Olympics in Pyeongchang, South Korea, and the 2022 Winter Olympics in Beijing, China.

== Personal life ==
In addition to being a former skier, Nannes is the director and founder of 'Global Snow Tours', an independent snow tour operator. He studied the saxophone at university. He was educated at Salesian College Chadstone and Wesley College Glen Waverley (both in Melbourne). Although it is sometimes claimed that Nannes speaks Japanese fluently, in an interview with the BBC, Nannes refuted this.

== See also ==
- List of cricketers who have played for two international teams
