= Kamran Khan (Indian cricketer) =

Indian cricketer

Personal information
- Born: 10 March 1991 (age 35); Azamgarh, Uttar Pradesh, India
- Batting: Left-handed
- Bowling: Left-arm fast-medium
- Role: Bowler

Domestic team information
- Years: Team
- 2009–2010: Rajasthan Royals
- 2010/11: Uttar Pradesh
- 2011: Pune Warriors India
- 2013: Colts

Career statistics
Competition	First-class	Twenty20
Matches	2	11
Runs scored	30	22
Batting average	10.00	22.00
100s/50s	0/0	0/0
Top score	15*	19*
Balls bowled	246	208
Wickets	5	12
Bowling average	28.60	25.00
5 wickets in innings	0	0
10 wickets in match	0	0
Best bowling	3/66	3/18
Catches/stumpings	0/–	4/–
- Source: ESPNcricinfo, 21 April 2014

Kamran Khan (born 10 March 1991) is an Indian cricketer who bowls left-arm fast-medium. He played in the Indian Premier League for Rajasthan Royals and later Pune Warriors India, and represented Uttar Pradesh and Colts Cricket Club at domestic level. Playing for RR, along with Kolkata Knight Riders Ajantha Mendis, he bowled the first ever super over in the history of the IPL.

Having impressed Darren Berry, the Rajasthan director of coaching, in a suburban Twenty20 tournament, Khan was given a contract worth about $24,000 with Rajasthan for the second season of the IPL. He made his T20 debut before having played a first-class match.

The son of a woodcutter, Khan has struggled with poverty. Telling of how he would travel to trials, he said "Be it Lucknow or Kanpur, I used to sleep at platforms. I used to buy a platform ticket and spend the night there ... I always had monetary problems. I never dared to ask money from my brothers. I had one pair of white clothes for trials". Shane Warne, the Rajasthan captain, described Khan as "a young kid, a left-armer, a slinger ... He's a tiny little guy but he bowls 140 km/h plus". The Pune Warriors India joined the IPL for its 2011 season and recruited Khan after two seasons with Rajasthan; however, he only played one match for Pune.

Nearly two years after his last twenty20 match, Khan made his first-class debut for Colts Cricket Club in March 2013.
