= England at the Men's T20 World Cup =

England national team performance at T20 World Cup

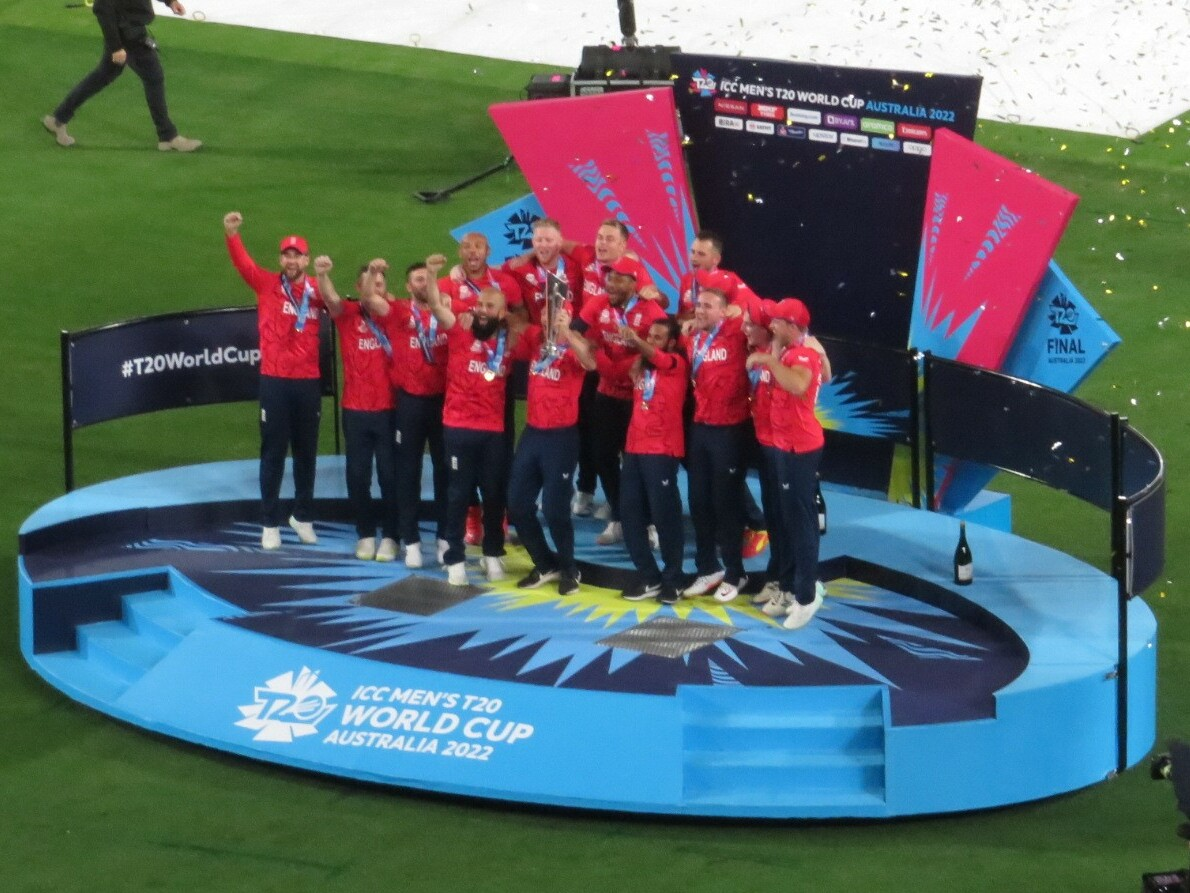
England lifting the trophy in 2022.

The England national cricket team is one of the full members of the International Cricket Council (ICC). They are the joint most successful team along with West Indies and India cricket team, having appeared in every edition of the tournament they have won the title twice in 2010 and 2022. While they had been the runners-up in 2016, they had also reached the semi-finals of the tournament three times in 2021, 2024 and 2026 . In ten editions, the team has a win-loss record of 34-24 wins in 61 matches.

== T20 World Cup record ==
Key
Champions
Runners-up
Semi-finals
Host

Year	Round	Position	GP	W	L	T	NR	Ab (Note: Abandoned matches are not counted in the official records.)	Captain
(South Africa) 2007	Super 8	7/12	5	1	4	0	0	0	Paul Collingwood
(England) 2009	Super 8	6/12	5	2	3	0	0	0	Paul Collingwood
(Cricket West Indies) 2010	Champions	1/12	7	5	1	0	1	0	Paul Collingwood
(Sri Lanka) 2012	Super 8	6/12	5	2	3	0	0	0	Stuart Broad
(Bangladesh) 2014	Super 10	7/16	4	1	3	0	0	0	Stuart Broad
(India) 2016	Runners-up	2/16	6	4	2	0	0	0	Eoin Morgan
(United Arab Emirates) (Oman) 2021	Semi-final	4/16	6	4	2	0	0	0	Eoin Morgan
(Australia) 2022	Champions	1/16	7	5	1	0	0	1	Jos Buttler
(Cricket West Indies) (United States) 2024	Semi-final	4/20	8	4	3	0	1	0	Jos Buttler
(India) (Sri Lanka) 2026	Semi-final	4/20	8	6	2	0	0	0	Harry Brook
(Australia) (New Zealand) 2028	Qualified								
Total	2 titles	10/10	61	34	24	0	2	1	—N/a

=== Record by opponents ===
Positive Record Neutral Record Negative Record

Opponent	M	W	L	T+W	T+L	NR	Ab	Win %	First played
Afghanistan	3	3	0	0	0	0	0	100	2012
Australia	5	2	2	0	0	0	1	50.00	2007
Bangladesh	1	1	0	0	0	0	0	100	2021
India	6	2	4	0	0	0	0	40.00	2007
Ireland	2	0	1	0	0	1	0	0.00	2010
Italy	1	1	0	0	0	0	0	100	2026
Namibia	1	1	0	0	0	0	0	100	2024
Nepal	1	1	0	0	0	0	0	100	2026
Netherlands	2	0	2	0	0	0	0	0.00	2009
New Zealand	8	5	3	0	0	0	0	62.50	2007
Oman	1	1	0	0	0	0	0	100	2024
Pakistan	4	4	0	0	0	0	0	100	2009
Scotland	2	1	0	0	0	1	0	100	2024
South Africa	7	2	5	0	0	0	0	28.57	2007
Sri Lanka	7	6	1	0	0	0	0	85.71	2010
United States	1	1	0	0	0	0	0	100	2024
West Indies	8	2	6	0	0	0	0	25.00	2009
Zimbabwe	1	1	0	0	0	0	0	100	2007
Total	61	34	24	0	0	2	1	54.54	—
Source: Last Updated: 8 March 2026

== Tournament results ==
=== South Africa 2007 ===
Squad and kit

- Paul Collingwood (c)
- Andrew Flintoff (vc)
- James Anderson
- Stuart Broad
- Darren Maddy
- Dimitri Mascarenhas
- Kevin Pietersen
- Matt Prior (wk)
- Chris Schofield
- Owais Shah
- Jeremy Snape
- Vikram Solanki
- Chris Tremlett
- Luke Wright

2007 kit

Results

Group stage (Group B)			Super 8 (Group E)				Semifinal	Final	Overall Result
Opposition Result	Opposition Result	Rank	Opposition Result	Opposition Result	Opposition Result	Rank	Opposition Result	Opposition Result	Overall Result
Zimbabwe; Won by 50 runs	Australia; Lost by 8 wickets	2	South Africa; Lost by 19 runs	New Zealand; Lost by 5 runs	India; Lost by 18 runs	4	Did not advance		Super 8
Source: Cricinfo

Scorecards

Group stage (Group B)

13 September
14:00
(scorecard)

England; 188/9 (20 overs)	v	Zimbabwe; 138/7 (20 overs)
Kevin Pietersen 79 (37); Elton Chigumbura 4/31 (4 overs)		Brendan Taylor 47 (39); Dimitri Mascarenhas 3/18 (4 overs)

England won by 50 runs
Newlands Cricket Ground, Cape Town
Umpires: Asad Rauf (Pak) and Ian Howell (SA)
Player of the match: Kevin Pietersen (Eng)

- England won the toss and elected to bat.
- Luke Wright, Darren Maddy and Chris Schofield (Eng) all made their T20I debuts.

14 September
14:00
(scorecard)

England; 135 (20 overs)	v	Australia; 136/2 (14.5 overs)
Andrew Flintoff 31 (19); Nathan Bracken 3/16 (4 overs)		Matthew Hayden 67* (43); Andrew Flintoff 1/25 (4 overs)

Australia won by 8 wickets
Newlands Cricket Ground, Cape Town
Umpires: Asad Rauf (Pak) and Ian Howell (SA)
Player of the match: Nathan Bracken (Aus)

- England won the toss and elected to bat.
- Australia and England qualified for the Super 8s as a result of this match.

Super 8 (Group E)

16 September
18:00
(scorecard)

South Africa; 154/8 (20 overs)	v	England; 135/7 (20 overs)
Albie Morkel 43 (20); Stuart Broad 3/37 (4 overs)		Owais Shah 36 (31); Albie Morkel 2/12 (2 overs)

South Africa won by 19 runs
Newlands Cricket Ground, Cape Town
Umpires: Asad Rauf (Pak) and Tony Hill (NZ)
Player of the match: Albie Morkel (SA)

- England won the toss and elected to field.

18 September
10:00
(scorecard)

New Zealand; 164/9 (20 overs)	v	England; 159/8 (20 overs)
Craig McMillan 57 (31); James Anderson 2/24 (4 overs)		Darren Maddy 50 (31); Shane Bond 2/20 (4 overs)

New Zealand won by 5 runs
Kingsmead, Durban
Umpires: Billy Doctrove (WI) and Simon Taufel (Aus)
Player of the match: Craig McMillan (NZ)

- England won the toss and elected to field.

19 September
18:00
(scorecard)

India; 218/4 (20 overs)	v	England; 200/6 (20 overs)
Virender Sehwag 68 (52); Chris Tremlett 2/45 (4 overs)		Vikram Solanki 43 (31); Irfan Pathan 3/37 (4 overs)

India won by 18 runs
Kingsmead, Durban
Umpires: Billy Doctrove (WI) and Simon Taufel (Aus)
Player of the match: Yuvraj Singh (Ind)

- India won the toss and elected to bat.

=== England 2009 ===
Squad and kit

- Paul Collingwood (c)
- James Anderson
- Ravi Bopara
- Stuart Broad
- James Foster (wk)
- Rob Key
- Dimitri Mascarenhas
- Eoin Morgan
- Graham Napier
- Kevin Pietersen
- Adil Rashid
- Owais Shah
- Ryan Sidebottom
- Graeme Swann
- Luke Wright

2009 kit

Results

Group stage (Group B)			Super 8 (Group E)				Semifinal	Final	Overall Result
Opposition Result	Opposition Result	Rank	Opposition Result	Opposition Result	Opposition Result	Rank	Opposition Result	Opposition Result	Overall Result
Netherlands; Lost by 4 wickets	Pakistan; Won by 48 runs	1	South Africa; Lost by 7 wickets	India; Won by 3 runs	West Indies; Lost by 5 wickets (DLS)	3	Did not advance		Super 8
Source: Cricinfo

Scorecards

Group stage (Group B)

5 June 2009
17:30 (D/N)
Scorecard

England; 162/5 (20 overs)	v	Netherlands; 163/6 (20 overs)
Luke Wright 71 (49); Ryan ten Doeschate 2/35 (4 overs)		Tom de Grooth 49 (30); James Anderson 3/23 (4 overs)

Netherlands won by 4 wickets
Lord's, London
Umpires: Asoka de Silva (SL) and Steve Davis (Aus)
Player of the match: Tom de Grooth (Ned)

- Netherlands won the toss and elected to field.

7 June 2009
18:30 (D/N)
Scorecard

England; 185/5 (20 overs)	v	Pakistan; 137/7 (20 overs)
Kevin Pietersen 58 (38); Saeed Ajmal 2/23 (4 overs)		Younis Khan 46* (31); Stuart Broad 3/17 (3 overs)

England won by 48 runs
The Oval, London
Umpires: Billy Doctrove (WI) and Daryl Harper (Aus)
Player of the match: Luke Wright (Eng)

- Pakistan won the toss and elected to field.
- England go through to the Super 8 stage as a result of this match.

Super 8 (Group E)

11 June 2009
17:30 (D/N)
Scorecard

England; 111 (19.5 overs)	v	South Africa; 114/3 (18.2 overs)
Owais Shah 38 (33); Wayne Parnell 3/14 (3.5 overs)		Jacques Kallis 57 (49); Stuart Broad 1/14 (3 overs)

South Africa won by 7 wickets
Trent Bridge, Nottingham
Umpires: Steve Davis (Aus) and Tony Hill (NZ)
Player of the match: Jacques Kallis (SA)

- England won the toss and elected to bat.

14 June 2009
17:30 (D/N)
Scorecard

England; 153/7 (20 overs)	v	India; 150/5 (20 overs)
Kevin Pietersen 46 (27); Harbhajan Singh 3/30 (4 overs)		Yusuf Pathan 33 (17); Graeme Swann 2/28 (4 overs)

England won by 3 runs
Lord's, London
Umpires: Steve Davis (Aus) and EAR de Silva (SL)
Player of the match: Ryan Sidebottom (Eng)

- India won the toss and elected to field.

15 June 2009
17:30 (D/N)
Scorecard

England; 161/6 (20 overs)	v	West Indies; 82/5 (8.2 overs)
Ravi Bopara 55 (47); Dwayne Bravo 2/30 (4 overs)		Ramnaresh Sarwan 19* (9); Adil Rashid 1/11 (1 over)

West Indies won by 5 wickets (D/L)
The Oval, London
Umpires: Aleem Dar (Pak) and Rudi Koertzen (SA)
Player of the match: Ramnaresh Sarwan (WI)

- England won the toss and elected to bat.
- Rain revised the West Indies' target to 80 runs from 9 overs according to the Duckworth–Lewis method.
- England were eliminated as a result of this match.

=== West Indies 2010 ===
Squad and kit

- Paul Collingwood (c)
- James Anderson
- Ravi Bopara
- Tim Bresnan
- Stuart Broad
- Craig Kieswetter (wk)
- Michael Lumb
- Eoin Morgan
- Kevin Pietersen
- Ajmal Shahzad
- Ryan Sidebottom
- Graeme Swann
- James Tredwell
- Luke Wright
- Michael Yardy

2010 kit

Results

Group stage (Group D)			Super 8 (Group E)				Semifinal	Final	Overall Result
Opposition Result	Opposition Result	Rank	Opposition Result	Opposition Result	Opposition Result	Rank	Opposition Result	Opposition Result	Overall Result
West Indies; Lost by 8 wickets (DLS)	Ireland; No result	2	Pakistan; Won by 6 wickets	South Africa; Won by 39 runs	New Zealand; Won by 3 wickets	1	Sri Lanka; Won by 7 wickets	Australia; Won by 7 wickets	Winners
Source: Cricinfo

Scorecards

Group stage (Group D)

3 May
13:30
Scorecard

England; 191/5 (20 overs)	v	West Indies; 60/2 (5.5 overs)
Eoin Morgan 55 (35); Darren Sammy 2/22 (4 overs)		Chris Gayle 25 (12); Graeme Swann 2/24 (2 overs)

West Indies won by 8 wickets (D/L)
Providence Stadium, Guyana
Umpires: Tony Hill (NZ) and Rudi Koertzen (SA)
Player of the match: Darren Sammy (WI)

- West Indies won the toss and elected to field.
- Rain reduced the West Indies innings to 6 overs. According to the Duckworth–Lewis method, their target was 60 runs.

4 May
13:30
Scorecard

England; 120/8 (20 overs)	v	Ireland; 14/1 (3.3 overs)
Eoin Morgan 45 (37); Kevin O'Brien 2/22 (3 overs)		Niall O'Brien 9* (5); Ryan Sidebottom 1/9 (1.3 overs)

No result
Providence Stadium, Guyana
Umpires: Billy Bowden (NZ) and Tony Hill (NZ)

- Ireland won the toss and elected to field.
- Rain reduced Ireland's innings to 3.3 overs, causing the match to be abandoned.
- England qualified for the Super 8s as a result of this match.

Super 8 (Group E)

6 May
09:30
Scorecard

Pakistan; 147/9 (20 overs)	v	England; 151/4 (19.3 overs)
Salman Butt 34 (26); Michael Yardy 2/19 (4 overs)		Kevin Pietersen 73* (52); Saeed Ajmal 2/18 (3.3 overs)

England won by 6 wickets
Kensington Oval, Bridgetown
Umpires: Billy Bowden (NZ) and Rudi Koertzen (SA)
Player of the match: Kevin Pietersen (Eng)

- England won the toss and elected to field.

8 May
13:30
Scorecard

England; 168/7 (20 overs)	v	South Africa; 129 (19 overs)
Kevin Pietersen 53 (33); Johan Botha 2/15 (4 overs)		JP Duminy 39 (25); Ryan Sidebottom 3/23 (4 overs)

England won by 39 runs
Kensington Oval, Bridgetown
Umpires: Aleem Dar (Pak) and Steve Davis (Aus)
Player of the match: Kevin Pietersen (Eng)

- England won the toss and elected to bat.

10 May
13:30
Scorecard

New Zealand; 149/6 (20 overs)	v	England; 153/7 (19.1 overs)
Ross Taylor 44 (33); Graeme Swann 2/31 (4 overs)		Eoin Morgan 40 (34); Scott Styris 2/16 (3 overs)

England won by 3 wickets
Beausejour Stadium, Gros Islet
Umpires: Steve Davis (Aus) and Simon Taufel (Aus)
Player of the match: Tim Bresnan (Eng)

- New Zealand won the toss and elected to bat.

Knockout stage

Semi-final 1
13 May
11:30
Scorecard

Sri Lanka; 128/6 (20 overs)	v	England; 132/3 (16 overs)
Angelo Mathews 58 (45); Stuart Broad 2/21 (4 overs)		Kevin Pietersen 42* (26); Thissara Perera 2/19 (2 overs)

England won by 7 wickets
Beausejour Stadium, Gros Islet
Umpires: Aleem Dar (Pak) and Simon Taufel (Aus)
Player of the match: Stuart Broad (Eng)

- Sri Lanka won the toss and elected to bat.

Final
16 May
11:30
Scorecard

Australia; 147/6 (20 overs)	v	England; 148/3 (17 overs)
David Hussey 59 (54); Ryan Sidebottom 2/26 (4 overs)		Craig Kieswetter 63 (49); Steve Smith 1/21 (3 overs)

England won by 7 wickets
Kensington Oval, Bridgetown
Umpires: Aleem Dar (Pak) and Billy Doctrove (WI)
Player of the match: Craig Kieswetter (Eng)

- England won the toss and elected to field.
- This was the first ICC event won by England.

=== Sri Lanka 2012 ===
Squad and kit

- Stuart Broad (c)
- Jonny Bairstow
- Ravi Bopara
- Danny Briggs
- Jos Buttler
- Jade Dernbach
- Steven Finn
- Alex Hales
- Craig Kieswetter (wk)
- Michael Lumb
- Eoin Morgan
- Samit Patel
- Graeme Swann
- Luke Wright
- Tim Bresnan

2012 kit

Results

Group stage (Group A)			Super 8 (Group E)				Semifinal	Final	Overall Result
Opposition Result	Opposition Result	Rank	Opposition Result	Opposition Result	Opposition Result	Rank	Opposition Result	Opposition Result	Overall Result
Afghanistan; Won by 116 runs	India; Lost by 90 runs	2	West Indies; Lost by 15 runs	New Zealand; Won by 6 wickets	Sri Lanka; Lost by 19 runs	3	Did not advance		Super 8
Source: Cricinfo

Scorecards

Group stage (Group A)

21 September
19:30 (D/N)
Scorecard

England; 196/5 (20 overs)	v	Afghanistan; 80 (17.2 overs)
Luke Wright 99* (55); Izatullah Dawlatzai 2/56 (3 overs)		Gulbadin Naib 44 (32); Samit Patel 2/6 (3 overs)

England won by 116 runs
R. Premadasa Stadium, Colombo
Umpires: Kumar Dharmasena (SL) and Simon Taufel (Aus)
Player of the match: Luke Wright (Eng)

- Afghanistan won the toss and elected to field
- Englandqualified for the Super Eights as a result of this match.

23 September
19:30 (D/N)
Scorecard

India; 170/4 (20 overs)	v	England; 80 (14.4 overs)
Rohit Sharma 55* (33); Steven Finn 2/33 (4 overs)		Craig Kieswetter 35 (25); Harbhajan Singh 4/12 (4 overs)

India won by 90 runs
R. Premadasa Stadium, Colombo
Umpires: Aleem Dar (Pak) and Simon Taufel (Aus)
Player of the match: Harbhajan Singh (Ind)

- England won the toss and elected to field
- This was England's lowest Twenty20 International score.
- England's 80 all out was the lowest total for a Test-playing nation in ICC World Twenty20.

Super 8 (Group E)

27 September
19:30 (D/N)
Scorecard

West Indies; 179/5 (20 overs)	v	England; 164/4 (20 overs)
Johnson Charles 84 (56); Stuart Broad 2/26 (4 overs)		Eoin Morgan 71* (36); Ravi Rampaul 2/37 (4 overs)

West Indies won by 15 runs
Pallekele International Cricket Stadium, Pallekele
Umpires: Asad Rauf (Pak) and Steve Davis (Aus)
Player of the match: Johnson Charles (WI)

- West Indies won the toss and elected to bat
- Eoin Morgan's 50 in 25 balls was fastest for England in the ICC World Twenty20

29 September
15:30 (D/N)
Scorecard

New Zealand; 148/6 (20 overs)	v	England; 149/4 (18.5 overs)
James Franklin 50 (33); Steven Finn 3/16 (4 overs)		Luke Wright 76 (43); Daniel Vettori 1/20 (4 overs)

England won by 6 wickets
Pallekele International Cricket Stadium, Pallekele
Umpires: Asad Rauf (Pak) and Simon Taufel (Aus)
Player of the match: Luke Wright (Eng)

- New Zealand won the toss and elected to bat

1 October
19:30 (D/N)
Scorecard

Sri Lanka; 169/6 (20 overs)	v	England; 150/9 (20 overs)
Mahela Jayawardene 42 (38); Stuart Broad 3/32 (4 overs)		Samit Patel 67 (48); Lasith Malinga 5/31 (4 overs)

Sri Lanka won by 19 runs
Pallekele International Cricket Stadium, Pallekele
Umpires: Steve Davis (Aus) and Simon Taufel (Aus)
Player of the match: Lasith Malinga (SL)

- England won the toss and elected to field
- England were eliminated as a result of this match.

=== Bangladesh 2014 ===
Squad and kit

- Stuart Broad (c)
- Eoin Morgan (vc)
- Moeen Ali
- Ian Bell
- Ravi Bopara
- Tim Bresnan
- Jos Buttler (wk)
- Jade Dernbach
- Steven Finn
- Alex Hales
- Chris Jordan
- Stephen Parry
- Joe Root
- Michael Lumb
- James Tredwell

2014 kit

Results

First stage		Super 10 (Group 1)					Semifinal	Final	Overall Result
Opposition Result	Rank	Opposition Result	Opposition Result	Opposition Result	Opposition Result	Rank	Opposition Result	Opposition Result	Overall Result
Advanced to next stage directly		New Zealand; Lost by 9 runs (DLS)	Sri Lanka; Won by 6 wickets	South Africa; Lost by 3 runs	Netherlands; Lost by 45 runs	4	Did not advance		Super 10
Source: Cricinfo

Scorecards

Super 10 (Group 1)

22 March
19:30 (D/N)
Scorecard

England; 172/6 (20 overs)	v	New Zealand; 52/1 (5.2 overs)
Moeen Ali 36 (23); Corey Anderson 2/32 (4 overs)		Kane Williamson 24* (17); Jade Dernbach 1/13 (2 overs)

New Zealand won by 9 runs (D/L method)
Zohur Ahmed Chowdhury Stadium, Chittagong
Umpires: Aleem Dar (Pak) and Paul Reiffel (Aus)
Player of the match: Corey Anderson (NZ)

- New Zealand won the toss and elected to field
- Rain stopped play after 5.2 overs during New Zealand's innings. Their par score was 43 runs according to the Duckworth-Lewis method.
- England captain Stuart Broad was fined 15% of his match fee for criticism of the umpire's decision to play during a thunderstorm.

27 March
19:30 (D/N)
Scorecard

Sri Lanka; 189/4 (20 overs)	v	England; 190/4 (19.2 overs)
Mahela Jayawardene 89 (51); Chris Jordan 2/28 (4 overs)		Alex Hales 116* (64); Nuwan Kulasekara 4/31 (4 overs)

England won by 6 wickets
Zohur Ahmed Chowdhury Stadium, Chittagong
Umpires: Aleem Dar (Pak) and Rod Tucker (Aus)
Player of the match: Alex Hales (Eng)

- England won the toss and elected to field
- Alex Hales' 116* is the highest score by an England player in T20Is.
- Due to a slow over rate Sri Lankan captain Dinesh Chandimal was banned from the next match and fined 20% of his match fees

29 March
19:30 (D/N)
Scorecard

South Africa; 196/5 (20 overs)	v	England; 193/7 (20 overs)
AB de Villiers 69* (28); James Tredwell 1/25 (3 overs)		Alex Hales 38 (22); Wayne Parnell 3/31 (4 overs)

South Africa won by 3 runs
Zohur Ahmed Chowdhury Stadium, Chittagong
Umpires: Steve Davis (Aus) and Rod Tucker (Aus)
Player of the match: AB de Villiers (SA)

- England won the toss and elected to field
- With this result England were eliminated.

31 March
15:30
Scorecard

Netherlands; 133/5 (20 overs)	v	England; 88 (17.4 overs)
Wesley Barresi 48 (45); Stuart Broad 3/24 (4 overs)		Ravi Bopara 18 (20); Mudassar Bukhari 3/12 (3.4 overs)

Netherlands won by 45 runs
Zohur Ahmed Chowdhury Stadium, Chittagong
Umpires: Steve Davis (Aus) and Bruce Oxenford (Aus)
Player of the match: Mudassar Bukhari (Neth)

- England won the toss and elected to field
- 88 is the lowest total of a Full Member Nation against an associate nation.

=== India 2016 ===
Squad and kit

- Eoin Morgan (c)
- Jos Buttler (wk, vc)
- Alex Hales
- Jason Roy
- Joe Root
- Ben Stokes
- Moeen Ali
- Chris Jordan
- David Willey
- Liam Plunkett
- Adil Rashid
- Sam Billings
- Liam Dawson
- James Vince
- Reece Topley

2016 kit

Results

First stage		Super 10 (Group 1)					Semifinal	Final	Overall Result
Opposition Result	Rank	Opposition Result	Opposition Result	Opposition Result	Opposition Result	Rank	Opposition Result	Opposition Result	Overall Result
Advanced to next stage directly		West Indies; Lost by 6 wickets	South Africa; Won by 2 wickets	Afghanistan; Won by 15 runs	Sri Lanka; Won by 10 runs	2	New Zealand; Won by 7 wickets	West Indies; Lost by 4 wickets	Runners-up
Source: Cricinfo

Scorecards

Super 10 (Group 1)

16 March
19:30 (D/N)
Scorecard

England; 182/6 (20 overs)	v	West Indies; 183/4 (18.1 overs)
Joe Root 48 (36); Andre Russell 2/36 (4 overs)		Chris Gayle 100* (48); Adil Rashid 1/20 (2 overs)

West Indies won by 6 wickets
Wankhede Stadium, Mumbai
Umpires: Chris Gaffaney (NZ) and Rod Tucker (Aus)
Player of the match: Chris Gayle (WI)

- West Indies won the toss and elected to field.

18 March
19:30 (D/N)
Scorecard

South Africa; 229/4 (20 overs)	v	England; 230/8 (19.4 overs)
Hashim Amla 58 (31); Moeen Ali 2/34 (4 overs)		Joe Root 83 (44); Kyle Abbott 3/41 (3.4 overs)

England won by 2 wickets
Wankhede Stadium, Mumbai
Umpires: Sundaram Ravi (Ind) and Paul Reiffel (Aus)
Player of the match: Joe Root (Eng)

- England won the toss and elected to field.
- England scored their first fifty runs from 17 balls, the joint second fastest in T20Is.

23 March
15:00 (D/N)
Scorecard

England; 142/7 (20 overs)	v	Afghanistan; 127/9 (20 overs)
Moeen Ali 41* (33); Mohammad Nabi 2/17 (4 overs); Rashid Khan 2/17 (4 overs)		Shafiqullah 35* (20); Adil Rashid 2/18 (3 overs)

England won by 15 runs
Feroz Shah Kotla Ground, Delhi
Umpires: Sundaram Ravi (Ind) and Rod Tucker (Aus)
Player of the match: Moeen Ali (Eng)

- England won the toss and elected to bat.

26 March
19:30 (D/N)
Scorecard

England; 171/4 (20 overs)	v	Sri Lanka; 161/8 (20 overs)
Jos Buttler 66* (37); Jeffrey Vandersay 2/26 (4 overs)		Angelo Mathews 73* (54); Chris Jordan 4/28 (4 overs)

England won by 10 runs
Feroz Shah Kotla Ground, Delhi
Umpires: Paul Reiffel (Aus) and Rod Tucker (Aus)
Player of the match: Jos Buttler (Eng)

- Sri Lanka won the toss and elected to field.
- England qualified for the semi-finals as a result of this match.

Knockout stage

Semi-final 1
30 March
19:00 (D/N)
Scorecard

New Zealand; 153/8 (20 overs)	v	England; 159/3 (17.1 overs)
Colin Munro 46 (32); Ben Stokes 3/26 (4 overs)		Jason Roy 78 (44); Ish Sodhi 2/42 (4 overs)

England won by 7 wickets
Feroz Shah Kotla Ground, Delhi
Umpires: Kumar Dharmasena (SL) and Rod Tucker (Aus)
Player of the match: Jason Roy (Eng)

- England won the toss and elected to field.
- Jason Roy scored the second-fastest 50 for an England player in a World Twenty20 match (26 balls).

Final
3 April
19:00 (D/N)
Scorecard

England; 155/9 (20 overs)	v	West Indies; 161/6 (19.4 overs)
Joe Root 54 (36); Carlos Brathwaite 3/23 (4 overs)		Marlon Samuels 85* (66); David Willey 3/20 (4 overs)

West Indies won by 4 wickets
Eden Gardens, Kolkata
Umpires: Kumar Dharmasena (SL) and Rod Tucker (Aus)
Player of the match: Marlon Samuels (WI)

- West Indies won the toss and elected to field.

=== Oman & UAE 2021 ===
Squad and kit

- Eoin Morgan (c)
- Jos Buttler (wk, vc)
- Moeen Ali
- Jonny Bairstow
- Sam Billings
- Tom Curran
- Chris Jordan
- Liam Livingstone
- Dawid Malan
- Tymal Mills
- Adil Rashid
- Jason Roy
- David Willey
- Chris Woakes
- Mark Wood

2021 kit

Results

First round		Super 12 (Group 1)						Semifinal	Final	Overall Result
Opposition Result	Rank	Opposition Result	Opposition Result	Opposition Result	Opposition Result	Opposition Result	Rank	Opposition Result	Opposition Result	Overall Result
Advanced to next stage directly		West Indies; Won by 6 wickets	Bangladesh; Won by 8 wickets	Australia; Won by 8 wickets	Sri Lanka; Won by 26 runs	South Africa; Lost by 10 runs	1	New Zealand; Lost by 5 wickets	Did not advance	Semi-finals
Source: Cricinfo

Scorecards

Super 12 (Group 1)

23 October 2021
18:00 (N)
Scorecard

West Indies; 55 (14.2 overs)	v	England; 56/4 (8.2 overs)
Chris Gayle 13 (13); Adil Rashid 4/2 (2.2 overs)		Jos Buttler 24* (22); Akeal Hosein 2/24 (4 overs)

England won by 6 wickets
Dubai International Cricket Stadium, Dubai
Umpires: Aleem Dar (Pak) and Marais Erasmus (SA)
Player of the match: Moeen Ali (Eng)

- England won the toss and elected to field.

27 October 2021
14:00
Scorecard

Bangladesh; 124/9 (20 overs)	v	England; 126/2 (14.1 overs)
Mushfiqur Rahim 29 (30); Tymal Mills 3/27 (4 overs)		Jason Roy 61 (38); Nasum Ahmed 1/26 (3 overs)

England won by 8 wickets
Sheikh Zayed Cricket Stadium, Abu Dhabi
Umpires: Nitin Menon (Ind) and Langton Rusere (Zim)
Player of the match: Jason Roy (Eng)

- Bangladesh won the toss and elected to bat.

30 October 2021
18:00 (N)
Scorecard

Australia; 125 (20 overs)	v	England; 126/2 (11.4 overs)
Aaron Finch 44 (49); Chris Jordan 3/17 (4 overs)		Jos Buttler 71* (32); Ashton Agar 1/15 (2.4 overs)

England won by 8 wickets
Dubai International Cricket Stadium, Dubai
Umpires: Marais Erasmus (SA) and Nitin Menon (Ind)
Player of the match: Chris Jordan (Eng)

- England won the toss and elected to field.

1 November 2021
18:00 (N)
Scorecard

England; 163/4 (20 overs)	v	Sri Lanka; 137 (19 overs)
Jos Buttler 101* (67); Wanindu Hasaranga 3/21 (4 overs)		Wanindu Hasaranga 34 (21); Moeen Ali 2/15 (3 overs)

England won by 26 runs
Sharjah Cricket Stadium, Sharjah
Umpires: Adrian Holdstock (SA) and Rod Tucker (Aus)
Player of the match: Jos Buttler (Eng)

- Sri Lanka won the toss and elected to field.
- Jos Buttler (Eng) scored his first century in T20Is.
- Eoin Morgan (Eng) won his 43rd match as captain to become the most successful captain in T20Is.

6 November 2021
18:00 (N)
Scorecard

South Africa; 189/2 (20 overs)	v	England; 179/8 (20 overs)
Rassie van der Dussen 94* (60); Moeen Ali 1/27 (4 overs)		Moeen Ali 37 (27); Kagiso Rabada 3/48 (4 overs)

South Africa won by 10 runs
Sharjah Cricket Stadium, Sharjah
Umpires: Chris Brown (NZ) and Joel Wilson (WI)
Player of the match: Rassie van der Dussen (SA)

- England won the toss and elected to field.
- England qualified for the semi-finals as a result of this match.

Knockout stage

Semi-final 1
10 November 2021
18:00 (N)
Scorecard

England; 166/4 (20 overs)	v	New Zealand; 167/5 (19 overs)
Moeen Ali 51* (37); James Neesham 1/18 (2 overs)		Daryl Mitchell 72* (47); Liam Livingstone 2/22 (4 overs)

New Zealand won by 5 wickets
Sheikh Zayed Cricket Stadium, Abu Dhabi
Umpires: Kumar Dharmasena (SL) and Marais Erasmus (SA)
Player of the match: Daryl Mitchell (NZ)

- New Zealand won the toss and elected to field.

=== Australia 2022 ===
Squad and kit

- Jos Buttler (c, wk)
- Moeen Ali
- Harry Brook
- Sam Curran
- Chris Jordan
- Liam Livingstone
- Dawid Malan
- Adil Rashid
- Phil Salt
- Ben Stokes
- Tymal Mills
- David Willey
- Chris Woakes
- Mark Wood
- Alex Hales

2022 kit

Results

First round		Super 12 (Group 1)						Semifinal	Final	Overall Result
Opposition Result	Rank	Opposition Result	Opposition Result	Opposition Result	Opposition Result	Opposition Result	Rank	Opposition Result	Opposition Result	Overall Result
Advanced to next stage directly		Afghanistan; Won by 5 wickets	Ireland; Lost by 5 runs (DLS)	Australia; Match abandoned	New Zealand; Won by 20 runs	Sri Lanka; Won by 4 wickets	2	India; Won by 10 wickets	Pakistan; Won by 5 wickets	Winners
Source: Cricinfo

Scorecards

Super 12 (Group 1)

22 October 2022
19:00 (N)
Scorecard

Afghanistan; 112 (19.4 overs)	v	England; 113/5 (18.1 overs)
Ibrahim Zadran 32 (32); Sam Curran 5/10 (3.4 overs)		Liam Livingstone 29* (21); Mohammad Nabi 1/16 (3 overs)

England won by 5 wickets
Perth Stadium, Perth
Umpires: Chris Brown (NZ) and Aleem Dar (Pak)
Player of the match: Sam Curran (Eng)

- England won the toss and elected to field.
- Sam Curran became the first bowler for England to take a five-wicket haul in T20Is.

26 October 2022
15:00
Scorecard

Ireland; 157 (19.2 overs)	v	England; 105/5 (14.3 overs)
Andrew Balbirnie 62 (47); Liam Livingstone 3/17 (3 overs)		Dawid Malan 35 (37); Josh Little 2/16 (3 overs)

Ireland won by 5 runs (DLS method)
Melbourne Cricket Ground, Melbourne
Umpires: Adrian Holdstock (SA) and Paul Reiffel (Aus)
Player of the match: Andrew Balbirnie (Ire)

- England won the toss and elected to field.
- Rain prevented any further play.
- England were 5 runs behind the DLS par score of 110 runs from 14.3 overs.

28 October 2022
19:00 (N)
Scorecard

Australia	v	England

Match abandoned
Melbourne Cricket Ground, Melbourne
Umpires: Chris Brown (NZ) and Joel Wilson (WI)

- No toss.
- No play was possible due to rain.

1 November 2022
18:00 (N)
Scorecard

England; 179/6 (20 overs)	v	New Zealand; 159/6 (20 overs)
Jos Buttler 73 (47); Lockie Ferguson 2/45 (4 overs)		Glenn Phillips 62 (36); Sam Curran 2/26 (4 overs)

England won by 20 runs
The Gabba, Brisbane
Umpires: Nitin Menon (Ind) and Langton Rusere (Zim)
Player of the match: Jos Buttler (Eng)

- England won the toss and elected to bat.

5 November 2022
19:00 (N)
Scorecard

Sri Lanka; 141/8 (20 overs)	v	England; 144/6 (19.4 overs)
Pathum Nissanka 67 (45); Mark Wood 3/26 (3 overs)		Alex Hales 47 (30); Wanindu Hasaranga 2/23 (4 overs)

England won by 4 wickets
Sydney Cricket Ground, Sydney
Umpires: Paul Reiffel (Aus) and Paul Wilson (Aus)
Player of the match: Adil Rashid (Eng)

- Sri Lanka won the toss and elected to bat.
- England qualified for the semi-finals as a result of this match.

Knockout stage

Semi-final 2
10 November 2022
18:30 (N)
Scorecard

India; 168/6 (20 overs)	v	England; 170/0 (16 overs)
Hardik Pandya 63 (33); Chris Jordan 3/43 (4 overs)		Alex Hales 86* (47)

England won by 10 wickets
Adelaide Oval, Adelaide
Umpires: Kumar Dharmasena (SL) and Paul Reiffel (Aus)
Player of the match: Alex Hales (Eng)

- England won the toss and elected to field.
- The 170-run partnership between England's Jos Buttler and Alex Hales was a record for a men's T20 World Cup match.
- England qualified for the final for the third time, after 2010 and 2016.

Final
13 November 2022
19:00 (N)
Scorecard

Pakistan; 137/8 (20 overs)	v	England; 138/5 (19 overs)
Shan Masood 38 (28); Sam Curran 3/12 (4 overs)		Ben Stokes 52* (49); Haris Rauf 2/23 (4 overs)

England won by 5 wickets
Melbourne Cricket Ground, Melbourne
Umpires: Kumar Dharmasena (SL) and Marais Erasmus (SA)
Player of the match: Sam Curran (Eng)

- England won the toss and elected to field.
- England won their second T20 World Cup title after 12 years, equalling West Indies for the most titles in T20 World Cup.
- England became the first men's team to hold both the ODI (50-over) and T20 World Cups simultaneously.

=== United States & West Indies 2024 ===
Squad and kit

- Jos Buttler (c, wk)
- Moeen Ali
- Jofra Archer
- Jonny Bairstow
- Harry Brook
- Sam Curran
- Ben Duckett
- Tom Hartley
- Will Jacks
- Chris Jordan
- Liam Livingstone
- Adil Rashid
- Phil Salt
- Reece Topley
- Mark Wood

2024 kit

Results

Group stage (Group B)					Super 8 (Group 2)				Semifinal	Final	Overall Result
Opposition Result	Opposition Result	Opposition Result	Opposition Result	Rank	Opposition Result	Opposition Result	Opposition Result	Rank	Opposition Result	Opposition Result	Overall Result
Scotland; No result	Australia; Lost by 36 runs	Oman; Won by 8 wickets	Namibia; Won by 41 runs (DLS)	2	West Indies; Won by 8 wickets	South Africa; Lost by 7 runs	United States; Won by 10 wickets	2	India; Lost by 68 runs	Did not advance	Semi-finals
Source: Cricinfo

Scorecards

Group stage (Group B)

4 June 2024
10:30 UTC−4
Scorecard

Scotland; 90/0 (10 overs)	v	England
Michael Jones 45* (30)

No result
Kensington Oval, Bridgetown
Umpires: Nitin Menon (Ind) and Asif Yaqoob (Pak)

- Scotland won the toss and elected to bat.
- The match was reduced to 10 overs per side due to rain.
- England were set a revised target of 109 from 10 overs due to rain.
- No further play was possible due to rain.

8 June 2024
13:00 UTC−4
Scorecard

Australia; 201/7 (20 overs)	v	England; 165/6 (20 overs)
David Warner 39 (16); Chris Jordan 2/44 (4 overs)		Jos Buttler 42 (28); Pat Cummins 2/23 (4 overs)

Australia won by 36 runs
Kensington Oval, Bridgetown
Umpires: Nitin Menon (Ind) and Joel Wilson (WI)
Player of the match: Adam Zampa (Aus)

- England won the toss and elected to field.
- Chris Jordan (Eng) took his 100th wicket in T20Is.

13 June 2024
15:00 UTC−4
Scorecard

Oman; 47 (13.2 overs)	v	England; 50/2 (3.1 overs)
Shoaib Khan 11 (23); Adil Rashid 4/11 (4 overs)		Jos Buttler 24* (8); Kaleemullah 1/10 (1 over)

England won by 8 wickets
Sir Vivian Richards Stadium, North Sound
Umpires: Langton Rusere (Zim) and Asif Yaqoob (Pak)
Player of the match: Adil Rashid (Eng)

- England won the toss and elected to field.

15 June 2024
13:00 UTC−4
Scorecard

England; 122/5 (10 overs)	v	Namibia; 84/3 (10 overs)
Harry Brook 47* (20); Ruben Trumpelmann 2/31 (2 overs)		Michael van Lingen 33 (29); Jofra Archer 1/15 (2 overs)

England won by 41 runs (DLS method)
Sir Vivian Richards Stadium, North Sound
Umpires: Adrian Holdstock (SA) and Langton Rusere (Zim)
Player of the match: Harry Brook (Eng)

- Namibia won the toss and elected to field.
- The match was reduced to 10 overs per side due to rain.
- Namibia were set a revised target of 126 from 10 overs due to rain.

Super 8 (Group 2)

19 June 2024
20:30 UTC−4 (N)
Scorecard

West Indies; 180/4 (20 overs)	v	England; 181/2 (17.3 overs)
Johnson Charles 38 (34); Moeen Ali 1/15 (2 overs)		Phil Salt 87* (47); Roston Chase 1/19 (3 overs)

England won by 8 wickets
Daren Sammy Cricket Ground, Gros Islet
Umpires: Nitin Menon (Ind) and Ahsan Raza (Pak)
Player of the match: Phil Salt (Eng)

- England won the toss and elected to field.

21 June 2024
10:30 UTC−4
Scorecard

South Africa; 163/6 (20 overs)	v	England; 156/6 (20 overs)
Quinton de Kock 65 (38); Jofra Archer 3/40 (4 overs)		Harry Brook 53 (37); Keshav Maharaj 2/25 (4 overs)

South Africa won by 7 runs
Daren Sammy Cricket Ground, Gros Islet
Umpires: Chris Brown (NZ) and Sharfuddoula (Ban)
Player of the match: Quinton de Kock (SA)

- England won the toss and elected to field.

23 June 2024
10:30 UTC−4
Scorecard

United States; 115 (18.5 overs)	v	England; 117/0 (9.4 overs)
Nitish Kumar 30 (24); Chris Jordan 4/10 (2.5 overs)		Jos Buttler 83* (38)

England won by 10 wickets
Kensington Oval, Bridgetown
Umpires: Chris Gaffaney (NZ) and Joel Wilson (WI)
Player of the match: Adil Rashid (Eng)

- England won the toss and elected to field.
- This was the first time England and United States faced each other in T20Is.
- Chris Jordan (Eng) took his first hat-trick in T20Is and became the first English player to take hat-trick in T20 World Cup. This was the third hat-trick of the tournament and overall the ninth in the history of the T20 World Cup.
- England qualified for the semi-finals as a result of this match.

Knockout stage

27 June 2024
10:30 UTC−4
Scorecard

India; 171/7 (20 overs)	v	England; 103 (16.4 overs)
Rohit Sharma 57 (39); Chris Jordan 3/37 (3 overs)		Harry Brook 25 (19); Kuldeep Yadav 3/19 (4 overs)

India won by 68 runs
Providence Stadium, Georgetown
Umpires: Chris Gaffaney (NZ) and Rod Tucker (Aus)
Player of the match: Axar Patel (Ind)

- England won the toss and elected to field.

=== India & Sri Lanka 2026 ===
Squad and kit

- Harry Brook (c)
- Ben Duckett
- Tom Banton
- Jofra Archer
- Rehan Ahmed
- Josh Tongue
- Sam Curran
- Phil Salt (wk)
- Jos Buttler (wk)
- Jamie Overton
- Luke Wood
- Jacob Bethell
- Liam Dawson
- Will Jacks
- Adil Rashid

2026 kit

Results

Group stage (Group C)					Super 8 (Group 2)				Semifinal	Final	Overall Result
Opposition Result	Opposition Result	Opposition Result	Opposition Result	Rank	Opposition Result	Opposition Result	Opposition Result	Rank	Opposition Result	Opposition Result	Overall Result
Nepal; Won by 4 runs	West Indies; Lost by 30 runs	Scotland; Won by 5 wickets	Italy; Won by 24 runs	2	Sri Lanka; Won by 51 runs	Pakistan; Won by 2 wickets	New Zealand; Won by 4 wickets	1	India; Lost by 7 runs	Did not advance	Semi-finals
Source: Cricinfo

Scorecards

Group stage (Group C)

Match 5
8 February 2026
15:00 UTC+5:30 (D/N)
Scorecard

England; 184/7 (20 overs)	v	Nepal; 180/6 (20 overs)
Jacob Bethell 55 (35); Dipendra Singh Airee 2/23 (3 overs)		Dipendra Singh Airee 44 (29); Liam Dawson 2/21 (4 overs)

England won by 4 runs
Wankhede Stadium, Mumbai
Attendance: 19,369
Umpires: Leslie Reifer (WI) and Rod Tucker (Aus)
Player of the match: Will Jacks (Eng)

- England won the toss and elected to bat.
- This was the first time England and Nepal faced each other in T20Is.
- Sher Malla (Nep) made his T20I debut. He became the second Nepali player and the 30th player overall to take a wicket with his first ball in T20Is.
- Dipendra Singh Airee (Nep) became the first Nepali cricketer to score 2,000 runs in T20Is.
- This was Nepal's highest-ever innings total in the T20 World Cup (180).

Match 15
11 February 2026
19:00 UTC+5:30 (N)
Scorecard

West Indies; 196/6 (20 overs)	v	England; 166 (19 overs)
Sherfane Rutherford 76* (42); Adil Rashid 2/16 (4 overs)		Sam Curran 43* (30); Gudakesh Motie 3/33 (4 overs)

West Indies won by 30 runs
Wankhede Stadium, Mumbai
Attendance: 21,577
Umpires: Donovan Koch (Aus) and Allahuddien Paleker (SA)
Player of the match: Sherfane Rutherford (WI)

- England won the toss and elected to field.

Match 23
14 February 2026
15:00 UTC+5:30 (D/N)
Scorecard

Scotland; 152 (19.4 overs)	v	England; 155/5 (18.2 overs)
Richie Berrington 49 (32); Adil Rashid 3/36 (4 overs)		Tom Banton 63* (41); Oliver Davidson 1/12 (2 overs)

England won by 5 wickets
Eden Gardens, Kolkata
Umpires: Chris Brown (NZ) and Allahuddien Paleker (SA)
Player of the match: Tom Banton (Eng)

- England won the toss and elected to field.
- Jos Buttler (Eng) played in his 150th T20I match and scored his 4,000th run in T20Is.
- Jofra Archer (Eng) took his 50th wicket in T20Is.
- This was England's maiden victory against a European country in T20 World Cups.

Match 29
16 February 2026
15:00 UTC+5:30 (D/N)
Scorecard

England; 202/7 (20 overs)	v	Italy; 178 (20 overs)
Will Jacks 53* (22); Crishan Kalugamage 2/41 (4 overs)		Ben Manenti 60 (25); Jamie Overton 3/18 (4 overs)

England won by 24 runs
Eden Gardens, Kolkata
Umpires: Chris Brown (NZ) and Donovan Koch (Aus)
Player of the match: Will Jacks (Eng)

- England won the toss and elected to bat.
- This was the first time England and Italy faced each other in T20Is.
- England qualified for the Super 8 while Italy and Scotland were eliminated as a result of this match.

Super 8 (Group 2)

Match 42
22 February 2026
15:00 UTC+5:30 (D/N)
Scorecard

England; 146/9 (20 overs)	v	Sri Lanka; 95 (16.4 overs)
Phil Salt 62 (40); Dunith Wellalage 3/26 (4 overs)		Dasun Shanaka 30 (24); Will Jacks 3/22 (4 overs)

England won by 51 runs
Pallekele Cricket Stadium, Kandy
Umpires: Adrian Holdstock (SA) and Ahsan Raza (Pak)
Player of the match: Will Jacks (Eng)

- Sri Lanka won the toss and elected to field.

Match 45
24 February 2026
19:00 UTC+5:30 (N)
Scorecard

Pakistan; 164/9 (20 overs)	v	England; 166/8 (19.1 overs)
Sahibzada Farhan 63 (45); Liam Dawson 3/24 (4 overs)		Harry Brook 100 (51); Shaheen Afridi 4/30 (4 overs)

England won by 2 wickets
Pallekele Cricket Stadium, Kandy
Umpires: Nitin Menon (Ind) and Sam Nogajski (Aus)
Player of the match: Harry Brook (Eng)

- Pakistan won the toss and elected to bat.
- Shadab Khan (Pak) scored his 1,000th run in T20Is. He also became the first cricketer from Pakistan to score 1,000 runs and take 100 wickets in T20Is.
- Harry Brook (Eng) scored his maiden century in T20Is. He also became the first captain to score a century in the T20 World Cup. This was the fourth century in the 2026 tournament and 15th overall in the T20 World Cup history.
- England qualified for their fifth consecutive and overall sixth T20 World Cup semi-final as a result of this match.

Match 49
27 February 2026
19:00 UTC+5:30 (N)
Scorecard

New Zealand; 159/7 (20 overs)	v	England; 161/6 (19.3 overs)
Glenn Phillips 39 (28); Will Jacks 2/23 (4 overs)		Tom Banton 33 (24); Rachin Ravindra 3/19 (4 overs)

England won by 4 wickets
R. Premadasa Stadium, Colombo
Umpires: Adrian Holdstock (SA) and Ahsan Raza (Pak)
Player of the match: Will Jacks (Eng)

- New Zealand won the toss and elected to bat.
- Matt Henry (NZ) took his 50th wicket in T20Is.
- Will Jacks (Eng) equalled Shane Watson's 2012 record for the most player of the match awards by a player in a single edition of the T20 World Cup (4).

Knockout stage

Semi-final 2
5 March 2026
19:00 UTC+5:30 (N)
Scorecard

India; 253/7 (20 overs)	v	England; 246/7 (20 overs)
Sanju Samson 89 (42); Will Jacks 2/40 (4 overs)		Jacob Bethell 105 (48); Hardik Pandya 2/38 (4 overs)

India won by 7 runs
Wankhede Stadium, Mumbai
Umpires: Chris Gaffaney (NZ) and Allahudien Paleker (SA)
Player of the match: Sanju Samson (Ind)

- England won the toss and elected to field.
- This was India's 20th appearance in a semi-final of an ICC limited-overs tournaments; the most by any nation.
- This was the third consecutive T20 World Cup semi-final between India and England.
- India's 253 was the highest total in T20 World Cup knockouts.
- The 499 runs scored in this match was the highest match aggregate in T20 World Cup history and second highest in T20Is.
- Jacob Bethell (Eng) scored his maiden T20I century and the highest individual score in T20 World Cup knockout matches. This was the seventh century of the 2026 tournament and 18th overall in T20 World Cup history. Bethell also became the fourth England player to score a century in all three international formats.
- India became the first team to qualify for four T20 World Cup finals.

== Records and statistics ==
=== Team records ===
Highest innings totals

Score	Opponent	Venue	Date
230/8 (19.4 overs)	South Africa	Wankhede Stadium, Mumbai	18 March 2016
200/6 (20 overs)	India	Kingsmead Cricket Ground, Durban	19 September 2007
196/5 (20 overs)	Afghanistan	R. Premadasa Stadium, Colombo	21 September 2012
193/7 (20 overs)	South Africa	Zohur Ahmed Chowdhury Stadium, Chittagong	29 March 2014
191/5 (20 overs)	West Indies	Providence Stadium, Providence	3 May 2010
Last updated: 15 June 2024

=== Individual records ===
Most appearances

This list consists top five tiers with most number of matches at the T20 World Cup. Jos Buttler has played most matches with a total of 30 matches, while Paul Collingwood has captained the team in most matches (17).

No.	Player	Matches	Years
1	Jos Buttler	30	2012-2024
2	Eoin Morgan	29	2009-2021
3	Stuart Broad	26	2007-2014
4	Moeen Ali	25	2014-2024
4	Adil Rashid	25	2009-2024
5	Luke Wright	26	2007-2014
Last updated: 15 June 2024

Most runs

No.	Player	Inns.	Runs	Average	HS	100	50	Years
1	Jos Buttler	29	865	43.25	101*	1	4	2012–2024
2	Kevin Pietersen	15	580	44.61	79	-	4	2007–2010
3	Alex Hales	20	568	31.55	113*	1	3	2012–2022
4	Eoin Morgan	27	552	26.28	71*	-	3	2009–2021
5	Luke Wright	20	439	25.82	99*	-	3	2007–2012
Last updated: 15 June 2024

Most wickets

No.	Player	Inns.	Wickets	BBI	Years
1	Stuart Broad	25	30	3/17	2007–2014
2	Adil Rashid	25	26	4/2	2009–2024
3	Chris Jordan	20	23	4/28	2014–2024
4	Graeme Swann	15	22	3/24	2009–2012
5	Moeen Ali	17	13	2/15	2012–2024
Last updated: 15 June 2024

== See also ==
- England at the Cricket World Cup
- ICC Men's T20 World Cup
