= Indian cricket team in Sri Lanka in 2012 =

Tour by the Indian Cricket Team in Sri Lanka during 2021

	Sri Lanka	India
- Dates: 21 July – 7 August
Captains	Mahela Jayawardene; Angelo Mathews (5th ODI and Only T20I)	MS Dhoni

One Day International series
- Results: India won the 5-match series 4–1
Most runs	Kumar Sangakkara (206)	Virat Kohli (296)
Most wickets	Thisara Perera (8); Lasith Malinga (8)	Irfan Pathan (8)
- Player of the series: Virat Kohli (Ind)

Twenty20 International series
- Results: India won the 1-match series 1–0
Most runs	Angelo Mathews (31)	Virat Kohli (68)
Most wickets	Shaminda Eranga (2)	Ashok Dinda (4)
- Player of the series: Virat Kohli (Ind)

The Indian cricket team toured Sri Lanka from 21 July to 7 August 2012. The tour consisted of five One Day Internationals (ODIs) and one Twenty20 International (T20I). India landed to Sri Lanka 18 July 2012.

== Squad ==
ODI		T20I	
Sri Lanka	India	Sri Lanka	India
Mahela Jayawardene (c); Angelo Mathews (vc); Dinesh Chandimal; Tillakaratne Dilshan; Nuwan Pradeep; Rangana Herath; Chamara Kapugedera; Lasith Malinga; Jeevan Mendis; Thisara Perera; Kumar Sangakkara (wk); Sachithra Senanayake; Upul Tharanga; Lahiru Thirimanne; Isuru Udana	MS Dhoni (c & wk); Virat Kohli (vc); Gautam Gambhir; Rohit Sharma; Suresh Raina; Manoj Tiwary; Ravichandran Ashwin; Vinay Kumar; Rahul Sharma; Ashok Dinda; Pragyan Ojha; Virender Sehwag; Zaheer Khan; Umesh Yadav; Ajinkya Rahane	Mahela Jayawardene (c); Angelo Mathews (vc); Dinesh Chandimal; Tillakaratne Dilshan; Nuwan Pradeep; Rangana Herath; Chamara Kapugedera; Lasith Malinga; Jeevan Mendis; Thisara Perera; Kumar Sangakkara (wk); Sachithra Senanayake; Upul Tharanga; Lahiru Thirimanne; Isuru Udana	MS Dhoni (c & wk); Virat Kohli (vc); Gautam Gambhir; Rohit Sharma; Suresh Raina; Manoj Tiwary; Ravichandran Ashwin; Vinay Kumar; Rahul Sharma; Ashok Dinda; Pragyan Ojha; Virender Sehwag; Zaheer Khan; Umesh Yadav; Ajinkya Rahane

== ODI series ==
.

=== 1st ODI ===
21 July
14:30 (D/N)
Scorecard

India; 314/6 (50 overs)	v	Sri Lanka; 293/9 (50 overs)
Virat Kohli 106 (113); Thisara Perera 3/70 (10 overs)		Kumar Sangakkara 133 (151); Irfan Pathan 2/37 (10 overs)

India won by 21 runs
Mahinda Rajapaksa International Stadium, Hambantota
Umpires: Ranmore Martinesz (SL) and Bruce Oxenford (Aus)
Player of the match: Virat Kohli (IND)

- India won the toss and chose to bat.

=== 2nd ODI ===
24 July
14:30 (D/N)
Scorecard

India; 138 (33.3 overs)	v	Sri Lanka; 139/1 (19.5 overs)
Gautam Gambhir 65 (96); Angelo Mathews 3/14 (7 overs)		Upul Tharanga 59 (60); Ravichandran Ashwin 1/18 (5 overs)

Sri Lanka won by 9 wickets
Mahinda Rajapaksa International Stadium, Hambantota
Umpires: Bruce Oxenford (Aus) and Ruchira Palliyaguruge (SL)
Player of the match: Thisara Perera (SL)

- India won the toss and chose to bat.

=== 3rd ODI ===
28 July
14:30 (D/N)
Scorecard

Sri Lanka; 286/5 (50 overs)	v	India; 288/5 (49.4 overs)
Kumar Sangakkara 73 (95); Zaheer Khan 2/39 (10 overs)		Gautam Gambhir 102 (101); Rangana Herath 1/36 (9 overs)

India win by 5 wickets
R Premadasa Stadium, Colombo
Umpires: Kumar Dharmasena (SL) and Bruce Oxenford (Aus)
Player of the match: Suresh Raina (Ind)

- Sri Lanka won the toss and chose to bat.

=== 4th ODI ===
31 July
14:30 (D/N)
Scorecard

Sri Lanka; 251/8 (50 overs)	v	India; 255/4 (42.2 overs)
Upul Tharanga 51 (73); Manoj Tiwary 4/61 (10 overs)		Virat Kohli 128 (119); Angelo Mathews 1/18 (6 overs)

India won by 6 wickets
R Premadasa Stadium, Colombo
Umpires: Kumar Dharmasena (SL) and Bruce Oxenford (Aus)
Player of the match: Virat Kohli (Ind)

- Sri Lanka won the toss and chose to bat.

=== 5th ODI ===
4 August
14:30 (D/N)
Scorecard

India; 294/7 (50 overs)	v	Sri Lanka; 274 (45.4 overs)
Gautam Gambhir 88 (99); Lasith Malinga 3/64 (10 overs)		Lahiru Thirimanne 77 (96); Irfan Pathan 5/61 (10 overs)

India won by 20 runs
Pallekele International Cricket Stadium, Kandy
Umpires: Tyron Wijewardene (SL) and Bruce Oxenford (Aus)
Player of the match: Irfan Pathan (Ind)

- India won the toss and chose to bat
- Zaheer Khan played his last ODI match.
- Gautam Gambhir completed his 5000 odi runs for India.

== T20I ==
7 August
19:00 (D/N)
Scorecard

India; 155/3 (20 overs)	v	Sri Lanka; 116 (18 overs)
Virat Kohli 68 (48); Shaminda Eranga 2/30 (4 overs)		Angelo Mathews 31 (29); Ashok Dinda 4/19 (3 overs)

India won by 39 runs
Pallekele International Cricket Stadium, Kandy
Umpires: Kumar Dharmasena (SL) and Tyron Wijewardene (SL)
Player of the match: Irfan Pathan (Ind)

- Sri Lanka won the toss and elected to field.

== Statistics ==
=== ODI ===
==== Batting ====
Player	Matches	Innigs	Runs	Average	Strike rate	50s	100s	High score
(India) Virat Kohli	5	5	290	74	87.83	0	2	128*
(India) Gautam Gambhir	5	5	286	51.60	84.03	2	1	102
(Sri Lanka) Kumar Sangakkara	3	2	206	103	83.73	1	1	133
(Sri Lanka) Upul Tharanga	5	5	177	44.25	80.09	2	0	59*
(India) Suresh Raina	5	5	174	58	118.36	3	0	65*

Full table at ESPNcricinfo

=== Bowling ===
Player	Matches	Innings	Wickets	Average	Strike rate	Economy rate	5 wickets	Best figures
(India) Irfan Pathan	5	5	8	26.37	30.0	5.27	1	5/61
(Sri Lanka) Thisara Perera	5	5	8	31.25	32.2	5.81	0	3/19
(Sri Lanka) Lasith Malinga	5	5	8	35.50	34.1	6.24	0	3/64
(Sri Lanka) Angelo Mathews	5	5	5	33.60	44.0	4.58	0	3/14
(India) Ravichandran Ashwin	5	5	5	39.40	52.8	4.47	0	2/46

Full table at ESPNcricinfo

== T20s ==
=== Batting ===
Player	Matches	Innings	Runs	Ball faced	Average	Strike rate	30s	50s	100s	High score	Fours	Sixes
(India) Virat Kohli	1	1	68	48	68	141.66	0	1	0	68	11	1
(India) Suresh Raina	1	1	34	25	-	136	1	0	0	34*	3	1
(Sri Lanka) Angelo Mathews	1	1	31	29	31	106.89	1	0	0	31	3	0
(Sri Lanka) Mahela Jayawardene	1	1	26	19	26	136.84	0	0	0	26	5	0
(India) Ajinkya Rahane	1	1	21	25	21	84	0	0	0	21	0	1

Full Table at ESPNcricinfo

=== Bowling ===
Player	Matches	Innings	Wickets	Overs	Maidens	Runs	Average	Strike rate	Economy rate	4 wickets	5 wickets	Best figures
(India) Ashok Dinda	1	1	4	3	0	19	4.75	4.50	6.33	1	0	4/19
(India) Irfan Pathan	1	1	3	4	0	27	9	8	6.75	0	0	3/27
(Sri Lanka) Shaminda Eranga	1	1	2	4	0	30	15	12	7.50	0	0	2/30
(Sri Lanka) Ajantha Mendis	1	1	1	2	0	13	13	12	6.50	0	0	1/13
(India) Ravichandran Ashwin	1	1	1	4	0	22	22	24	5.50	0	0	1/22

Full Table at ESPNcricinfo
