= Bharat Sundaresan =

Indian sports journalist

- Born: 6 May 1985 (age 41); Mumbai, India
- Occupation: Sports journalist
- Years active: 2008–present

Bharat Sundaresan (born 6 May 1985) is an Indian-born sports journalist and author based in Australia. He was formerly a cricket writer with The Indian Express, and is currently the Australian correspondent and a senior writer for Cricbuzz.

== Early life ==
Sundaresan was born in Mumbai, India. He became obsessed with cricket from a young age.

== Career ==
Sundaresan made the move from Mumbai to Chennai to take up a course in journalism. In Chennai, he got a job with The Indian Express. Sundaresan moved to Australia in late 2018 after over a decade with The Indian Express. He is now the Australian correspondent and a senior writer for Cricbuzz, and a commentator with the cricket coverage for Seven Network.

Sundaresan also works with SEN. In late 2025, he announced a podcast and radio show, Stumps and Bumps, co-hosted with Eric Bischoff.

Sundaresan has also written works for AFL Media.

=== Books ===
Sundaresan has authored several non-fiction books, including an unofficial biography of MS Dhoni titled The Dhoni Touch: Unravelling the Enigma That Is Mahendra Singh Dhoni, co-authoring the memoir of Suresh Raina, titled Believe: What Life and Cricket Taught Me, and The Miracle Makers: Indian Cricket's Greatest Epic with Gaurav Joshi.

== Activism ==
Sundaresan has spoken out about his experiences with racism in Australia.

== Personal life ==
Sundaresan met his wife, Isha Chatterjee, in college. He gained Australian citizenship in 2025. He lives in the Adelaide Hills and supports the Adelaide Crows in the AFL.
