= Arthur Bethell =

Barbadian cricketer (1940–2023)

Personal information
- Full name: John Arthur Lionel Bethell
- Born: 18 December 1940; Bowmanston, St John, Barbados
- Died: 21 November 2023 (aged 82); Barbados
- Batting: Left-handed
- Bowling: Left arm medium
- Relatives: Jacob Bethell (grandson)

Domestic team information
- Years: Team
- 1963/64–1969/70: Barbados

Career statistics
Competition	First-class	List A
Matches	16	1
Runs scored	496	15
Batting average	26.10	15.00
100s/50s	0/4	0/0
Top score	84*	15
Balls bowled	898	60
Wickets	10	2
Bowling average	39.10	9.00
5 wickets in innings	0	0
10 wickets in match	0	0
Best bowling	2/16	2/18
Catches/stumpings	7/–	1/–
- Source: ESPNcricinfo, 16 September 2024

John Arthur Lionel Bethell (18 December 1940 – 21 November 2023) was a Barbadian cricketer. He played sixteen first-class matches for Barbados between 1963 and 1970, and captained the side in the 1969 Shell Shield. He is the grandfather of Warwickshire and England cricketer Jacob Bethell.

Playing for the Barbados Second-XI ("Colts"), Bethell scored 157 against Australia during their tour of the West Indies in 1964–65, and he captained them when the M.C.C. toured the West Indies in 1967–68. His highest first-class score of 84 not out was made for Barbados against Nottinghamshire at Trent Bridge in August 1969. Bethell later held several top positions in the insurance industry, and died on 21 November 2023, aged 82.
