= Jeevan Mendis =

Sri Lankan cricketer (born 1983)

Personal information
- Full name: Balapuwaduge Manukulasuriya Amith Jeevan Mendis
- Born: 15 January 1983 (age 43); Colombo, Sri Lanka
- Height: 5 ft 8 in (173 cm)
- Batting: Left-handed
- Bowling: Leg break
- Role: All-rounder

International information
- National side: Sri Lanka (2010–2019)
- ODI debut (cap 145): 1 June 2010 v Zimbabwe
- Last ODI: 28 June 2019 v South Africa
- T20I debut (cap 38): 25 July 2011 v England
- Last T20I: 16 March 2018 v Bangladesh
- T20I shirt no.: 88

Domestic team information
- Years: Team
- 2001: Bloomfield
- 2002–2008: Sinhalese
- 2008–present: Tamil Union
- 2008–2010: Kandurata
- 2010: Dhaka Division
- 2011: Ruhuna
- 2012: Basnahira Cricket Dundee
- 2012: Sydney Sixers
- 2013: Delhi Daredevils
- 2013: Uthura
- 2014: Yaal Blazers
- 2014: Barbados Tridents
- 2015, 2017: Chittagong Vikings
- 2016: Barisal Bulls
- 2017: Derbyshire
- 2018/19: Tshwane Spartans
- 2019/20: Sylhet Thunder

Career statistics
| Competition | ODI | T20I | FC | LA |
|---|---|---|---|---|
| Matches | 58 | 22 | 161 | 206 |
| Runs scored | 636 | 208 | 7,769 | 3,407 |
| Batting average | 18.70 | 18.91 | 35.80 | 23.82 |
| 100s/50s | 0/1 | 0/0 | 21/35 | 0/16 |
| Top score | 72 | 43* | 206* | 99* |
| Balls bowled | 1,404 | 210 | 16,750 | 5,532 |
| Wickets | 28 | 12 | 352 | 153 |
| Bowling average | 43.00 | 20.75 | 27.31 | 28.53 |
| 5 wickets in innings | 0 | 0 | 17 | 2 |
| 10 wickets in match | 0 | 0 | 2 | 0 |
| Best bowling | 3/15 | 3/24 | 6/37 | 5/12 |
| Catches/stumpings | 13/– | 7/– | 125/– | 69/1 |
Medal record
Men's Cricket
Representing Sri Lanka
Asian Games
| Gold medal – first place | 2014 Incheon | Team |
ICC World T20
| Runner-up | 2012 Sri Lanka |
- Source: ESPNcricinfo, 28 June 2019

Balapuwaduge Manukulasuriya Amith Jeevan Mendis (Sinhala: ජීවන් මෙන්ඩිස්; born 15 January 1983) is a former Sri Lankan professional cricketer, who played limited over internationals. An all-rounder who bowls leg spin, Mendis has represented Sri Lanka in the 2012 World Twenty20 and 2015 World Cup. Domestically, he plays for Tamil Union in Sri Lanka, and he has also played for Derbyshire in England during 2017. Mendis announced his retirement from international cricket on 28 December 2021 and migrated to Australia.

== Youth career ==
Mendis was born in Colombo and went to S. Thomas' College, Mount Lavinia. A left-handed batsman, he debuted in 2000/01 and the following season captained the Under-19 team to victory in a one-day game. He represented the Sri Lankan A side in 2005. He held the best bowling figures in U19 Cricket World Cup history where he recorded 7/20 v Zimbabwe U19's until his record was surpassed by Australia's Jason Ralston (7/19) at the 2018 Under-19 Cricket World Cup, which was then surpassed in the same tournament by Ralston's compatriot Lloyd Pope (who took 8/35). He is the only Sri Lankan to pick up a 7 wicket haul in an U19 match.

== Domestic career ==
Mendis made his Twenty20 debut on 17 August 2004, for Sinhalese Sports Club in the 2004 SLC Twenty20 Tournament. In Sri Lankan domestic cricket, Mendis has played for Tamil Union since the 2008–09 season. During the first half of the 2017 season, he played for Derbyshire in England as an overseas player.

In March 2018, he was named in Kandy's squad for the 2017–18 Super Four Provincial Tournament. The following month, he was also named in Kandy's squad for the 2018 Super Provincial One Day Tournament.

In August 2018, he was named in Colombo's squad the 2018 SLC T20 League. In December 2018, in the 2018–19 Premier League Tournament, he took the best bowling figures in 2018 in a first-class cricket match, with 9 for 53 from 29 overs. He was the leading wicket-taker for Tamil Union Cricket and Athletic Club in the tournament, with 30 dismissals in five matches.

In March 2019, he was named in Dambulla's squad for the 2019 Super Provincial One Day Tournament.

== International career ==
Mendis made his international debut in the 2010 Zimbabwe Tri-Nation Series in the 3rd Match on 1 June 2010 against Zimbabwe. He did not get any opportunity to bat as his number didn't come up, but he bowled 4 overs, giving 12 runs, and took two wickets. In his second ODI of the series against India, he scored an unbeaten 35 off 35 balls where Sri Lanka won the match by 6 wickets. In the final of the series, he took two wickets against Zimbabwe, and Sri Lanka won the championship comprehensively.

In the opening match of 2012 ICC World Twenty20 against Zimbabwe at Hambantota, he came to the crease at 82/3 after 11.3 overs and scored a 43* from 30 balls, hitting 4 fours and a six and scripted a game-changing 49 ball 94 runs partnership with Kumar Sangakkara (44 off 26 balls) to help his side reach 182/4. With the ball, he took 3/24 from his 4 overs and ably assisted spin partner Ajantha Mendis, who took a record 6/8 from his 4 overs. In the same year, he made his highest ODI score of 72 against India on 4 August 2012. However, Sri Lanka lost the match by 20 runs. On 10 November 2012, he achieved his best ODI bowling figures, where he took 3 for 15 against New Zealand in a rain-affected match in Hambantota. Sri Lanka finally won the match by 7 wickets and Mendis won the man of the match award.

After three years of break in international arena, Mendis was surprisingly picked up for the Twenty20 International series against Bangladesh in February 2018. He played his comeback match on 15 February 2018 and took two wickets for just 21 runs. Sri Lanka won the match by 6 wickets.

In April 2019, he was named in Sri Lanka's squad for the 2019 Cricket World Cup. After lean streak by both bat and ball, he was dropped from the limited over squad following the exit from World Cup.

== T20 franchise cricket ==
In October 2018, he was named in Tshwane Spartans' squad for the first edition of the Mzansi Super League T20 tournament. He was the joint-leading wicket-taker for the team in the tournament, with sixteen dismissals in nine matches. In November 2019, he was selected to play for the Sylhet Thunder in the 2019–20 Bangladesh Premier League.
