= List of Champions League Twenty20 records and statistics =

This is a list of statistics and records of the Champions League Twenty20, a Twenty20 cricket competition.

== Team records ==
=== Results summary ===
The table below provides an overview of the performances of teams over past editions of the Champions League Twenty20. League and group stages are considered equivalent.

| Team | Apprd | Span | Mat | Won | Lost | Tie+W | Tie+L | NR | Win % |
|---|---|---|---|---|---|---|---|---|---|
| Chennai Super Kings | 5 | 2010 - 2014 | 24 | 15 | 8 | 0 | 1 | 0 | 62.50 |
| Mumbai Indians | 5 | 2010 - 2014 | 22 | 11 | 9 | 0 | 0 | 2 | 55.00 |
| Trinidad and Tobago | 4 | 2009 - 2013 | 19 | 12 | 5 | 0 | 1 | 1 | 69.44 |
| Royal Challengers Bangalore | 3 | 2009 - 2011 | 15 | 7 | 8 | 0 | 0 | 0 | 46.67 |
| Kolkata Knight Riders | 3 | 2011 - 2014 | 14 | 8 | 5 | 0 | 0 | 1 | 61.53 |
| Highveld Lions | 3 | 2010 - 2013 | 14 | 6 | 6 | 0 | 1 | 1 | 50.00 |
| New South Wales Blues | 2 | 2010 - 2011 | 11 | 7 | 3 | 1 | 0 | 0 | 68.18 |
| Somerset | 2 | 2009 - 2011 | 11 | 5 | 5 | 0 | 0 | 1 | 50.00 |
| Cape Cobras | 3 | 2009 - 2014 | 11 | 4 | 6 | 0 | 0 | 1 | 40.00 |
| Warriors | 2 | 2010 - 2011 | 10 | 6 | 4 | 0 | 0 | 0 | 60.00 |
| Perth Scorchers | 2 | 2012 - 2013 | 10 | 2 | 6 | 0 | 0 | 2 | 25.00 |
| Southern Redbacks | 2 | 2010 - 2011 | 9 | 5 | 3 | 0 | 0 | 1 | 62.50 |
| Titans | 2 | 2012 - 2013 | 9 | 4 | 4 | 0 | 0 | 1 | 50.00 |
| Victorian Bushrangers | 2 | 2009 - 2010 | 9 | 4 | 4 | 1 | 0 | 0 | 50.00 |
| Delhi Daredevils | 2 | 2009 - 2012 | 8 | 4 | 3 | 0 | 0 | 1 | 57.14 |
| Otago cricket team | 2 | 2009 - 2013 | 8 | 4 | 3 | 1 | 0 | 0 | 56.25 |
| Northern Knights | 1 | 2014 - 2014 | 7 | 4 | 3 | 0 | 0 | 0 | 57.14 |
| Auckland Aces | 2 | 2012 - 2012 | 7 | 3 | 4 | 0 | 1 | 0 | 42.85 |
| Sydney Sixers | 1 | 2012 - 2012 | 6 | 6 | 0 | 0 | 0 | 0 | 100.00 |
| Rajasthan Royals | 1 | 2013 - 2013 | 6 | 5 | 1 | 0 | 0 | 0 | 83.33 |
| Sunrisers Hyderabad | 1 | 2013 - 2013 | 6 | 3 | 3 | 0 | 0 | 0 | 50.00 |
| Yorkshire Carnegie | 1 | 2012 - 2012 | 6 | 2 | 3 | 0 | 0 | 1 | 40.00 |
| Wayamba | 2 | 2009 - 2010 | 6 | 2 | 4 | 0 | 0 | 0 | 33.33 |
| Kings XI Punjab | 1 | 2014 - 2014 | 5 | 4 | 1 | 0 | 0 | 0 | 80.00 |
| Hobart Hurricanes | 1 | 2014 - 2014 | 4 | 3 | 1 | 0 | 0 | 0 | 75.00 |
| Lahore Lions | 1 | 2014 - 2014 | 4 | 2 | 2 | 0 | 0 | 0 | 50.00 |
| Diamond Eagles | 1 | 2009 - 2009 | 4 | 1 | 2 | 1 | 0 | 0 | 37.50 |
| Central Districts Stags | 1 | 2010 - 2010 | 4 | 0 | 4 | 0 | 0 | 0 | 0.00 |
| Guyana | 1 | 2010 - 2010 | 4 | 0 | 4 | 0 | 0 | 0 | 0.00 |
| Faisalabad Wolves | 1 | 2013 - 2013 | 3 | 1 | 2 | 0 | 0 | 0 | 33.33 |
| Brisbane Heat | 1 | 2013 - 2013 | 3 | 0 | 3 | 0 | 0 | 0 | 0.00 |
| Kandurata Maroons | 1 | 2013 - 2013 | 3 | 0 | 3 | 0 | 0 | 0 | 0.00 |
| Southern Express | 1 | 2014 - 2014 | 3 | 0 | 3 | 0 | 0 | 0 | 0.00 |
| Ruhuna | 1 | 2011 - 2011 | 2 | 1 | 1 | 0 | 0 | 0 | 50.00 |
| Sialkot Stallions | 1 | 2012 - 2012 | 2 | 1 | 1 | 0 | 0 | 0 | 50.00 |
| Sussex Sharks | 1 | 2009 - 2009 | 2 | 0 | 1 | 0 | 1 | 0 | 25.00 |
| Uva Next | 1 | 2012 - 2012 | 2 | 0 | 1 | 0 | 0 | 1 | 0.00 |
| Deccan Chargers | 1 | 2009 - 2009 | 2 | 0 | 2 | 0 | 0 | 0 | 0.00 |
| Dolphins | 1 | 2014 - 2014 | 2 | 0 | 2 | 0 | 0 | 0 | 0.00 |
| Hampshire | 1 | 2012 - 2012 | 2 | 0 | 2 | 0 | 0 | 0 | 0.00 |
| Leicestershire Foxes | 1 | 2011 - 2011 | 2 | 0 | 2 | 0 | 0 | 0 | 0.00 |

Note: List includes qualifier results also.

- Tie+W and Tie+L indicates matches tied and then won or lost by "Super Over"
- Apprd = No. of times teams participated in the tournament
- The above table is sorted by no. of matches, then no. of wins, less no. of defeats, win%, no. of appearances and then by alphabetical order

Source: Results Summary

=== Highest totals ===
| Score | Team | Opponent | Season |
|---|---|---|---|
| 242/4 | Otago Volts | Perth Scorchers | 2013 |
| 242/6 | Chennai Super Kings | Dolphins | 2014 |
| 215/5 | Kings XI Punjab | Northern Knights | 2014 |
| 215/8 | Royal Challengers Bangalore | South Australian Redbacks | 2011 |
| 214/2 | South Australian Redbacks | Royal Challengers Bangalore | 2011 |
| 213/4 | Trinidad and Tobago | Diamond Eagles | 2009 |

Full Table on Cricinfo

=== Lowest totals ===
| Score | Team | Opponent | Season |
|---|---|---|---|
| 70 | Central Districts Stags | Wayamba | 2010 |
| 84 | Cape Cobras | Delhi Daredevils | 2009 |
| 89 | Titans | Kolkata Knight Riders | 2012 |
| 90/9 | Victorian Bushrangers | New South Wales Blues | 2009 |
| 91/9 | Diamond Eagles | New South Wales Blues | 2009 |

Full Table on Cricinfo

== Batting Records ==
=== Most runs ===
| Batsman | Inns | Runs | Span |
|---|---|---|---|
| Suresh Raina (CSK) | 24 | 842 | 2010–2014 |
| Kieron Pollard (MI, T&T) | 27 | 649 | 2009–2014 |
| David Warner (DD, NSW) | 12 | 556 | 2009–2012 |
| Michael Hussey (CSK, MI) | 17 | 540 | 2010–2014 |
| Murali Vijay (CSK) | 19 | 497 | 2010–2013 |

Full Table on Cricinfo

=== Highest individual score ===
| Batsman | Runs | Balls | Opp | Season |
|---|---|---|---|---|
| David Warner (NSW) | 135* | 69 | CSK | 2011 |
| David Warner (NSW) | 123* | 68 | RCB | 2011 |
| Neil Broom (OT) | 117* | 56 | SCO | 2013 |
| Suresh Raina (CSK) | 109* | 62 | KKR | 2014 |
| Quinton de Kock (LIO) | 109* | 63 | OT | 2013 |
| Daniel Harris (SAR) | 108* | 61 | RCB | 2011 |

Full Table on Cricinfo

=== Most sixes ===
| Batsman | 6's | Span |
|---|---|---|
| Kieron Pollard (MI, T&T) | 49 | 2009–2014 |
| Suresh Raina (CSK) | 39 | 2010–2014 |
| David Warner (DD, NSW) | 27 | 2009–2012 |
| MS Dhoni (CSK) | 26 | 2009–2014 |
| Chris Gayle (RCB) | 24 | 2011 |

Full Table on Cricinfo

=== Most Fifties ===
| Batsman | 50's | Span |
|---|---|---|
| Suresh Raina (CSK) | 6 | 2010–2014 |
| Henry Davids (CC, TITN) | 5 | 2009–2013 |
| Michael Hussey (CSK) | 5 | 2010–2013 |
| Ajinkya Rahane (RR) | 4 | 2013–2013 |
| Callum Ferguson (SAR) | 4 | 2010–2011 |

Full Table on Cricinfo

=== Most hundreds ===
| Batsman | 100's | Span |
|---|---|---|
| David Warner (DD, NSW) | 2 | 2009–2011 |

Note: Team in brackets represents for which the batsman scored century

Full Table on Cricinfo

=== Best strike rates ===
| Batsman | SR | Span |
|---|---|---|
| Chris Gayle (RCB) | 178.47 | 2011–2011 |
| Ryan ten Doeschate (KKR, OT) | 168.24 | 2011–2013 |
| Kieron Pollard (MI, T&T) | 157.44 | 2009–2013 |
| David Warner (DD, NSW) | 156.61 | 2009–2012 |
| Michael Lumb (SS) | 155.86 | 2012–2012 |

Minimum 100 balls faced

Full Table on Cricinfo

=== Highest averages ===
| Batsman | Inns | Avg | Span |
|---|---|---|---|
| David Warner (DD, NSW) | 12 | 55.60 | 2009–2012 |
| Jacques Kallis (KKR, RCB) | 13 | 54.28 | 2009–2012 |
| Henry Davids (CC, TTN) | 13 | 45.09 | 2009–2013 |
| JP Duminy (CC, MI, SRH) | 18 | 45.00 | 2009–2013 |
| Neil McKenzie (LIO) | 10 | 43.00 | 2010–2013 |

Minimum of 10 innings

Full Table on Cricinfo

== Bowling Records ==
=== Most wickets ===
| Bowler | Mat | Wkts | Span |
|---|---|---|---|
| Sunil Narine (KKR, T&T) | 18 | 35 | 2011–2014 |
| Dwayne Bravo (CSK, MI, T&T) | 20 | 30 | 2009–2014 |
| Doug Bollinger (CSK, HH, NSW) | 23 | 28 | 2010–2014 |
| Ravichandran Ashwin (CSK) | 21 | 26 | 2010–2014 |
| Ravi Rampaul (T&T) | 18 | 23 | 2009–2013 |

Full Table on Cricinfo

=== Best bowling figures in an innings ===
| Player | Ovr | BBI | Opp | Season |
|---|---|---|---|---|
| Pawan Negi (CSK) | 4 | 5/22 | KKR | 2014 |
| Azhar Mahmood (AA) | 4 | 5/24 | HAM | 2012 |
| Lasith Malinga (MI) | 4 | 5/32 | RCB | 2012 |
| Shaun Tait (SAR) | 4 | 5/32 | CSK | 2012 |
| Sunil Narine (T&T) | 4 | 4/9 | SRH | 2013 |
| Matthew Gale (BRI) | 2.5 | 4/10 | TTN | 2013 |

Full Table on Cricinfo

=== Best economy rates ===
Minimum 10 overs bowled

| Player | Mat | Econ | Span |
|---|---|---|---|
| Sunil Narine (KKR, T&T) | 15 | 4.46 | 2011–2013 |
| Brett Lee (KKR, NSW) | 15 | 5.71 | 2009–2012 |
| Samuel Badree (T&T) | 15 | 5.87 | 2009–2013 |
| Roelof van der Merwe (RCB, SOM, TTN) | 20 | 6.30 | 2009–2013 |
| Andrew McDonald (LEI, UN, VIC) | 13 | 6.52 | 2009–2012 |

Full Table on Cricinfo

=== Hat-tricks ===
| Bowlers | Opponent | Season |
|---|---|---|
| Isuru Udana (WAY) | Central Districts Stags | 2010 |
| Parvinder Awana (KXIP) | Chennai Super Kings | 2014 |

== Wicketkeeping and Fielding records ==
=== Most dismissals ===
| Wicket Keeper | Dis | Ct | St | Span |
|---|---|---|---|---|
| MS Dhoni (CSK) | 21 | 12 | 9 | 2010–2014 |
| Brad Haddin (KKR, SS) | 12 | 11 | 1 | 2011–2012 |
| Denesh Ramdin (T&T) | 10 | 9 | 1 | 2009–2013 |
| Parthiv Patel (SRH) | 8 | 8 | 0 | 2013–2013 |
| Matthew Wade (VIC) | 8 | 6 | 2 | 2009–2010 |

Full Table on Cricinfo

=== Most catches (fielder) ===
| Player | Mat | Ct | Span |
|---|---|---|---|
| Kieron Pollard (Mumbai, T&T) | 28 | 15 | 2009–2014 |
| Lendl Simmons (Trinidad and Tobago) | 22 | 12 | 2009–2014 |
| Alviro Petersen (Highveld Lions) | 14 | 11 | 2010–2013 |
| Virat Kohli (Royal Challengers Bangalore) | 15 | 10 | 2009–2011 |
| Suresh Raina (Chennai Super Kings) | 20 | 10 | 2010–2014 |

Full Table on Cricinfo

== Miscellaneous records ==
| Record | Player(s) / Team(s) | No. | Season(s) |
|---|---|---|---|
| Most wins | Chennai Super Kings | 15 | 2010-2014 |
| Most defeats | Mumbai Indians | 9 | 2010-2014 |
| Largest victory (runs) | Kings XI Punjab v NK | 120 | 2014 |
| Fastest 100 runs (balls) | Kane Williamson (NK) v CC | 48 | 2014 |
| Fastest 50 runs (balls) | MS Dhoni (CSK) v SRH | 16 | 2013 |
| Most 6's in an innings | David Warner (NSW) v RCB | 11 | 2011 |
| Most ducks | Rob Quiney (AA, VIC) | 4 | 2009-2011 |
| Most 4 wicket hauls | Lasith Malinga (MI); Sunil Narine (KKR, T&T); Ravi Rampaul (BT, T&T) | 2 | 2010-2014; 2011-2014; 2009-2014 |
| Most 5 wicket hauls | Lasith Malinga (MI); Shaun Tait (SA); Pawan Negi (CSK) | 1 | 2010-2014; 2010-2011; 2012 |
| Highest Partnership (runs) | Robin Uthappa (KKR); Manish Pandey (KKR) | 153* v DOL | 2014 |
| Most matches | Kieron Pollard (MI, T&T) | 28 | 2009-2014 |
| Most matches as captain | MS Dhoni (CSK) | 21 | 2010-2014 |
| Most matches as an umpire | Kumar Dharmasena | 35 | 2009-2014 |
