= Believe: What Life and Cricket Taught Me =

Autobiography by Suresh Raina and Bharat Sundaresan

- Author: Suresh Raina and Bharat Sundaresan
- Language: English
- Subject: Suresh Raina
- Genre: Autobiography
- Published: 14 June 2021
- Publisher: Penguin Random House
- Publication place: India
- Media type: Print
- Pages: 240
- ISBN: 978-01-43453-61-1

Believe: What Life and Cricket Taught Me is an autobiography by former Indian international cricketer Suresh Raina and sports journalist Bharat Sundaresan, documenting Raina's journey through the ups and downs of his personal life and professional cricket career. The book details Raina's upbringing in Muradnagar, Uttar Pradesh, his formative years at the Guru Gobind Singh Sports College in Lucknow, his international debut for India in 2005, and his experiences overcoming career-threatening injuries, failures, and pressure moments. It was published on 14 June 2021 by Penguin Random House India.

The book received positive reviews from critics and readers alike, with praise directed toward its candid reflections on leadership, failure, resilience, and the mental toughness required to succeed at the highest level of international sport.

== Summary ==
The book begins with Suresh Raina recounting his early life and how he developed a passion for cricket in Muradnagar despite facing various challenges. It covers his admission to the Guru Gobind Singh Sports College in Lucknow at a young age, where he learned discipline, teamwork, and the fundamentals of professional sport away from his family. The narrative proceeds to detail his breakthrough performances in domestic cricket, leading to his One-Day International (ODI) debut for India against Sri Lanka in Dambulla in July 2005 under the captaincy of Rahul Dravid and coaching of Greg Chappell.

Raina elaborates on his roller-coaster international career, discussing his role as a dependable middle-order batsman and an athletic fielder in India's limited-overs setup. He shares detailed anecdotes regarding India's victorious 2011 Cricket World Cup campaign, highlighting crucial partnerships in the quarter-final against Australia and the semi-final against Pakistan. The book addresses his struggles with short-pitched bowling during the 2011 Test tour of England, his subsequent drop from the red-ball team, and how he fought back through domestic performances in tournaments like the Syed Mushtaq Ali Trophy to earn national recalls.

Furthermore, the autobiography touches upon leadership experiences under Mahendra Singh Dhoni and his brief stint captaining the Indian team in Bangladesh and the West Indies. The concluding chapters reflect on his international retirement on 15 August 2020 alongside Dhoni, offering insights into his mindset, mentorship under senior players, and life lessons learned through setbacks and triumphs on the 22 yards.

== Critical Reception ==
Chintan Girish Modi for Firstpost.com stated that the book "also records the pain of the descendants of Kashmiri Pandits who were compelled to leave the valley in the 1990s." Biswadeep Ghosh for Hindustan Times wrote "The cricketer from Muradnagar in Uttar Pradesh was born into a family of modest financial means, and he is admirably frank while talking about his early struggle. Playing in a drainage canal and having kulfi and bread pakodas are precious memories for him."

== Publication history ==
The book was announced in April 2021 and was published in 2021. It was released by Penguin Random House India and is 240 pages long. The title Believe refers to a message that Raina says he received from Sachin Tendulkar.

According to coverage of the book, the word "Believe" also became the title of Raina's memoir after he had the word tattooed on his arm.

Region	Release date	Language	Format	Publisher	Ref.
India	14 June 2021	English	Hardcover/Paperback	Penguin Random House	
India	14 June 2021	English	Amazon Kindle	Penguin Random House	
India	15 July 2021	Hindi	Paperback	Penguin Random House	

== Sources ==
- Raina, Suresh; Sundaresan, Bharat (14 June 2021). Believe: What Life and Cricket Taught Me. New Delhi, India: Penguin Random House. ISBN 978-01-43453-61-1.
- "Suresh Raina's autobiography 'Believe: What Life and Cricket Taught Me' launched". The Hindu. 14 June 2021.
- "Failures teach you more than success: Suresh Raina on his new book 'Believe'". The Indian Express. 10 June 2021.
