= Suresh Raina =

Indian cricketer (born 1986)

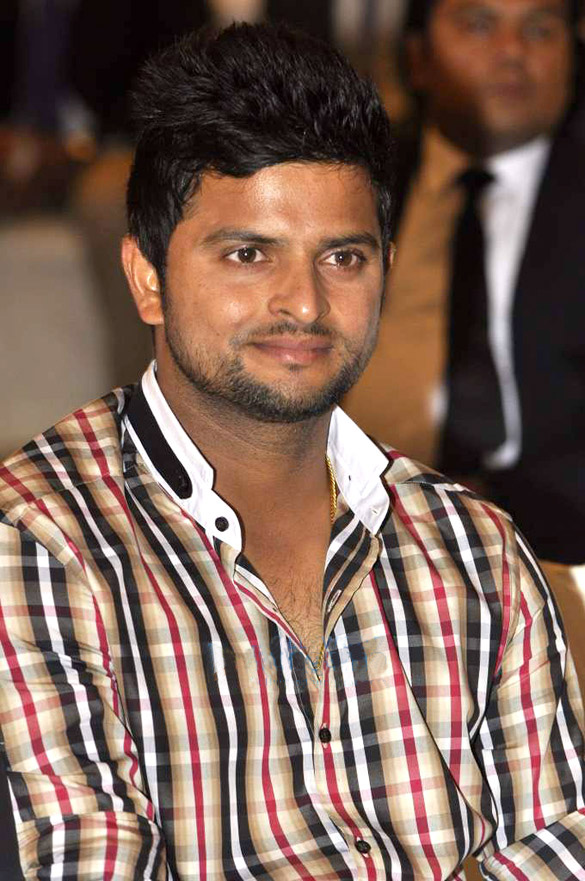
- Raina in 2013

Personal information
- Full name: Suresh Kumar Raina
- Born: 27 November 1986 (age 39); Muradnagar, Uttar Pradesh, India
- Nickname: Sonu, Chinna Thala, Mr. IPL
- Height: 5 ft 8 in (173 cm)
- Batting: Left-handed
- Bowling: Right-arm off-spin
- Role: Batsman

International information
- National side: India (2005–2018)
- Test debut (cap 265): 26 July 2010 v Sri Lanka
- Last Test: 10 January 2015 v Australia
- ODI debut (cap 159): 30 July 2005 v Sri Lanka
- Last ODI: 17 July 2018 v England
- ODI shirt no.: 48 (formerly 3, 30)
- T20I debut (cap 8): 1 December 2006 v South Africa
- Last T20I: 8 July 2018 v England
- T20I shirt no.: 3 (formerly 48, 30)

Domestic team information
- Years: Team
- 2002/03–2020/21: Uttar Pradesh
- 2008–2015, 2018–2021: Chennai Super Kings
- 2016–2017: Gujarat Lions
- 2022: Deccan Gladiators

Career statistics
Competition	Test	ODI	T20I	FC
Matches	18	226	78	109
Runs scored	768	5,615	1,605	6,871
Batting average	26.48	35.31	29.18	42.15
100s/50s	1/7	5/36	1/5	14/45
Top score	120	116*	101	204*
Balls bowled	1,041	2,126	349	3,457
Wickets	13	36	13	41
Bowling average	46.38	50.30	34.00	41.97
5 wickets in innings	0	0	0	0
10 wickets in match	0	0	0	0
Best bowling	2/1	3/34	2/6	3/31
Catches/stumpings	23/–	102/–	42/–	118/–
Medal record
Men's cricket
Representing India
ICC Cricket World Cup
Winner	2011 India-Bangladesh-Sri Lanka
ICC Champions Trophy
Winner	2013 England & Wales
ICC T20 World Cup
Runner-up	2014 Bangladesh
ACC Asia Cup
Winner	2010 Sri Lanka
Winner	2016 Bangladesh
Runner-up	2008 Pakistan
ACC U19 Asia Cup
Winner	2003 Pakistan
- Source: ESPNcricinfo, 8 December 2025

Suresh Raina (born 27 November 1986) is an Indian former international cricketer. He played for the India national team and represented Uttar Pradesh in domestic cricket. He was an aggressive left-handed middle-order batsman and who occasionally bowled right-arm off-spin. Raina is the first Indian batsman to hit a century in all three formats of international cricket, and the first Indian to score a century in the T20 World Cup. He was a member of the Indian team that won the 2011 Cricket World Cup and the 2013 ICC Champions Trophy.

Suresh Raina was a crucial member of the Indian team that won the 2011 Cricket World Cup and the 2013 ICC Champions Trophy. He plays for Uttar Pradesh in domestic cricket and represented Chennai Super Kings in the Indian Premier League. In 2010, Raina became the first Indian batsman to score a century in all three formats of international cricket. He was ranked number one in T20I batting rankings during his career.

Raina served as captain of the Indian limited-overs team on multiple tours and captained the Chennai Super Kings in the absence of MS Dhoni. He was known for his exceptional fielding abilities, lower-middle-order batting stability, and useful off-spin bowling.

After retiring from international cricket on 15 August 2020, Raina officially announced his retirement from all formats of domestic cricket and the IPL in September 2022. He is married to Priyanka Chaudhary, and they have two children.

== Early life ==
Raina was born on 27 November 1986 in Muradnagar, Uttar Pradesh. His family left Rainawari in Jammu and Kashmir amid the exodus of Kashmiri Hindus in the 1990s and settled down in Muradnagar. Raina's father, Trilokchand Raina, served as a military officer and worked at an ordnance factory, while his mother, Parvesh Raina, was a homemaker. He completed his schooling at a boarding school and moved to Lucknow in 1998 to attend Guru Gobind Singh Sports College where he completed his bachelor's degree in commerce. He also obtained a Bachelor of Arts degree from the University of Lucknow. Raina also holds an honorary doctorate from Vels University. He has a sister and an elder brother who serves in the Indian Army.

== Domestic career ==
Raina rose to become the captain of the Uttar Pradesh U-16s and came to prominence amongst Indian selectors in 2002 when he was selected at the age of 15 1/2 years for the U-19 tour to England, where he made a pair of half-centuries in the U-19 Test matches. He toured Sri Lanka later that year with the U-17 team.

He made his Ranji Trophy debut for Uttar Pradesh against Assam in February 2003 at the age of 16 but did not play another match until the following season. He debuted in List A Cricket against Madhya Pradesh at Indore in 2005 and scored 16 runs. He played for India green, UP under 16, India Blue, India Red, Rest of India, India under 19, Indian board's president's XI, Rajasthan Cricket association's president's XI, India seniors, Central zone. In Ranji trophy 2005–06 season he scored 620 in 6 games. In 2018 Akshdeep Nath replaced him as UP's Ranji trophy captain due to poor performance of scoring 105 runs in 9 innings averaging 11.66.

In late 2003, he toured Pakistan for the U-19 Asian ODI Championship before being selected for the 2004 U-19 World Cup, where he scored three half-centuries, including a 90 scored off only 38 balls. He was then awarded a Border–Gavaskar scholarship to train at the Australian Cricket Academy and in early 2005, he made his first-class limited overs debut, and scored 645 runs that season at an average of 53.75.

== International career ==
Suresh Raina was a middle order batsman. He made his debut for India in a one-day international vs Sri Lanka in Dambulla on 30 July 2005.

Raina had a successful career in ODIs playing 226 matches, scoring 5615 runs, averaging 35.3 with the bat at a strike rate of 93.5, playing several crucial and important innings for India.

He also had a successful career in T20s playing 78 matches, scoring 1605 runs, averaging 29.1 at a strike rate of 134.87.

Raina was a useful part-time off spin bowler in limited overs cricket, getting 36 wickets in ODIs and 13 wickets in T20s.

He was one of the top fielders of his time and renowned for his agility, sharp reflexes and throwing accuracy. He was often stationed in the inner ring, saving runs and effecting crucial run-outs. Former South African Cricketer Jonty Rhodes ranked Suresh Raina as Number 1 in his 'top fielders' list

Raina however was less successful in tests than in the limited over formats (ODIs, T20s). He played 18 tests for India averaging 26.48.

In the group stage match vs South Africa in the 2010 T20 World Cup, Raina became the first Indian batsman to score a century in T20s.

In the quarter-final of the 2011 Cricket World Cup vs Australia, Raina came in at 187-5 and along with Yuvraj, helped India chase down a target of 260 by scoring a significant 34*(28).

In the semi-final of 2011 Cricket World Cup vs Pakistan, Raina batted with tailenders to score an unbeaten 36, a significant contribution to India's final tally of 260.

Apart from a half-century in the first Test of India tour of England 2011 at Lord's, Raina managed just 27 runs from seven innings. He struggled against short bowling and in the final Test was out for a 29-ball duck, the longest in India's Test history.

In the second ODI of Indian tour of Sri Lanka 2012, he was out for 1 but he came back stronger in the third ODI where he played 45 balls 65 to hand India a five-wicket win and he eventually also won the man of the match award for his performance. After the Tour of Sri Lanka, when the England team came to India, he was dropped and his spot was given to Yuvraj Singh, who made a comeback after suffering from cancer.

His knock of 100 against England during England tour of India 2012–13 at Cardiff was nominated to be one of the best ODI batting performance of the year by ESPNcricinfo.

Raina was not selected in India's first tour to USA, where they played against West Indies for 2 T20Is. However, he made a re-entry to the ODI team for a series against New Zealand. Later he was ruled out due to Chikungunya .

In 2011, India toured West Indies after the World Cup with captain MS Dhoni rested and vice-captain Virender Sehwag injured. Gautam Gambhir was named the captain for the ODIs and T20's with Raina as his deputy. But due to injury, Gautam Gambhir was ruled out with Raina captaining with Harbhajan Singh as his deputy. During the 2014 Bangladesh series, he led his team to a 2–0 victory in the series. During the 2nd match of the series, India was all out for 105 runs while batting first. Suresh Raina and his team successfully defended the total of 105 runs, winning the match by 47 runs.

In the 2015 Cricket World Cup league stage match vs Pakistan, Raina "blasted his way to 74 off 56 balls… that set the momentum for India’s impressive total of 300 for seven.”

=== Final years and retirement ===
Raina returned to the Indian T20 international side in February 2018 on the back of his recent performance in domestic cricket particularly Syed Mushtaq Ali Trophy. He was named in the Indian T20I squad where India would face South Africa in three match T20I series. The series went well for him as he became the talk of the town as he smashed 43 runs off 27 balls to help India post a competitive total on board in the final T20I. Not just that, he also chipped in with the ball, returning with figures of 1/27 off his 3 overs and was rewarded with the Man of the Match award.

Raina announced his retirement from all formats of international cricket on 15 August 2020, minutes after the retirement of Mahendra Singh Dhoni. On Instagram, Raina said "It was nothing but lovely playing with you, @mahi7781. With my heart full of pride, I choose to join you in your journey. Thank you India. Jai Hind."

Following his announcement, tributes poured in from prominent figures across the country and the cricketing fraternity. Prime Minister Narendra Modi wrote an official letter of appreciation to Raina, praising his exemplary team spirit, unselfish contributions, and athletic fielding, while noting that he was "way too young and energetic to retire." Legendary batsman Sachin Tendulkar congratulated him on a wonderful career, recalling their on-field partnerships and conversations during Raina's Test debut. Fellow cricketers including Virat Kohli, Rohit Sharma, and VVS Laxman also extended their wishes, lauding his immense impact on Indian white-ball cricket and his unforgettable match-winning contributions.

== International centuries ==
Raina has scored 7 international centuries – 1 in Test cricket, 5 in One Day Internationals and 1 in Twenty20 Internationals. He was the first Indian cricketer to score a century in all three formats of international cricket.

Test centuries
No.	Runs	Against	Pos.	Inn.	Test	Venue	H/A/N	Date	Result	Ref.
1	120	Sri Lanka	6	2	2/3	Sinhalese Sports Club Ground, Colombo	Away	26 July 2010	Drawn	

ODI centuries
No.	Runs	Against	Pos.	Inn.	S/R	Venue	H/A/N	Date	Result	Ref.
1	101	Hong Kong	4	1	148.52	National Stadium, Karachi	Neutral	25 June 2008	Won	
2	116*	Bangladesh	5	2	108.41	National Stadium, Karachi	Neutral	28 June 2008	Won	
3	106	Sri Lanka	6	1	92.17	Shere Bangla Stadium, Mirpur	Neutral	13 January 2010	Lost	
4	100	England	5	1	133.33	SWALEC Stadium, Cardiff	Away	27 August 2014	Won	
5	110*	Zimbabwe	5	2	105.76	Eden Park, Auckland	Neutral	14 March 2015	Won	

T20I centuries
No.	Runs	Against	Pos.	Inn.	S/R	Venue	H/A/N	Date	Result	Ref.
1	101	South Africa	3	1	168.33	Beausejour Stadium, St. Lucia	Neutral	2 May 2010	Won	

== Franchise career ==
=== Indian Premier League ===
Chennai Super Kings

T20 Cricket

Indian Premier League
Winner	2010, 2011, 2018, 2021	
Runner-up	2008, 2012, 2013, 2015, 2019	

Champions League
Winner	2010, 2014	

Gujarat Lions

T20 Cricket

Indian Premier League

Raina was awarded "best fielder" by the BCCI ahead of the finals of IPL 2010. He played a vital half-century which turned the final to Chennai's tide who ultimately went on to become the champions beating the Mumbai Indians. For his performances in 2010, he was named in the ESPNcricinfo IPL XI.

For his performances in 2013, he was named in the ESPNcricinfo CLT20 XI.

On 30 May 2014, he made 87 runs out of 25 balls against Kings XI Punjab in qualifier 2. He missed the fastest century of the cricketing history by just 13 runs due to a runout. For his performances in 2014, he was named in the ESPNcricinfo IPL XI and ESPNcricinfo CLT20 XI.

In 2016, Raina was signed for the Gujarat Lions after the suspension of CSK. He captained the team for the season, and remained consistent with batting, scoring 399 runs in 15 innings. Raina had to leave for the Netherlands in between of season 9 for birth of his first child thus making him miss his first ever match in nine seasons of IPL.

On the occasion of the 10 year anniversary of IPL, he was also named in the all-time ESPNcricinfo IPL XI.

He was named in the Cricbuzz IPL XI of the tournament for 2017.

In IPL 2018, Raina was retained by the returning Super Kings for a price tag of 11 crore ($1.7 million). During the second game of the tournament, Raina suffered a calf injury, due to which he was ruled out of the next two games.

On 23 March 2019, in the first match of the 12th edition of the tournament against RCB, he became the first batsman to score 5000 runs in the IPL.

In 2020, Raina flew to UAE where the IPL was to be played due to the ongoing COVID-19 pandemic with the Super Kings squad. But his uncle Ashok Kumar was assaulted during a robbery in their house in Punjab, and didn't survive. Due to this, Raina withdrew from 2020 IPL season to support his family.

In 2021, Raina became the fourth player in IPL history to play 200 matches, behind MS Dhoni, Rohit Sharma and Dinesh Karthik.

He went unsold in the 2022 IPL Auctions. On 6 September 2022, he announced his retirement from all forms of cricket, including IPL and domestic cricket. He then became a commentator for the tournament.

=== Abu Dhabi T10 ===
After announcing retirement from all formats of cricket on 6 September 2022, Raina immediately joined the Deccan Gladiators for the 6th edition of Abu Dhabi T10 league becoming eligible under league regulations that permit only players retired from end‑user domestic cricket and IPL.

Raina made his T10 debut on 23 November 2022 against Team Abu Dhabi, where he was dismissed for a two balls duck, falling to leg‑spinner Peter Hatzaglou. Although his initial outing raised eyebrows but he remained in the playing XI and was later promoted to opening the batting in upcoming matches.

In the final, Gladiators set a total of 128 and his contribution was just 7 runs off 5 balls. Despite this, his team successfully defended the total, defeating New York Strikers by 37 runs to become the champions. He ended his season scoring only 35 runs with the bat in the 7 matches he appeared.

=== Other franchise cricket ===
In September 2022, he signed a contract with the Road Safety World Series league and played for 'Indian Legends' team.

In 2023, he was selected as the captain by Urbanrisers Hyderabad in Legends League Cricket and the team made it to the finals.

== Outside cricket ==
=== Personal life ===
Raina married Priyanka Chaudhary on 3 April 2015 in a private ceremony in New Delhi. Priyanka was his childhood friend, and her father was reportedly Raina's sports teacher in Ghaziabad. Raina had previously confirmed that the wedding was scheduled for 3 April in Delhi.

The couple's first child, a daughter was born in Amsterdam on 15 May 2016. Their second child, a son was born in March 2020.

=== Autobiography ===
Believe: What Life and Cricket Taught Me is an autobiography by Indian cricketer Suresh Raina, co-written with sports journalist Bharat Sundaresan. The book was published by Penguin Random House India in 2021.

The book discusses Raina's early life, his development as a cricketer, and experiences during his professional cricket career. It also covers the influence of senior Indian cricketers, including Sachin Tendulkar, Rahul Dravid and Mahendra Singh Dhoni. Raina discussed the motivation behind the book and the significance of the word "Believe" in an interview with The Times of India.

=== Philanthropy ===
In May 2017, Raina and his wife Priyanka launched the Gracia Raina Foundation, named after their daughter. The foundation was established to support underprivileged mothers and children and to raise awareness of maternal and newborn health, as well as related physical and mental health issues. Priyanka said that the foundation's work developed from her experiences as a mother and her concerns about gaps in access to healthcare and information for women and children.

The foundation's programmes have focused on maternal, adolescent, reproductive and mental health. Its Right AGE programme has addressed subjects including menstrual health, nutrition, contraception, sexually transmitted infections, teenage pregnancy and emotional well-being among adolescents. Its EveryMother programme has focused on maternal health, including pregnancy, childbirth, postpartum recovery, lactation and family planning. The foundation has also conducted health-awareness programmes in schools and colleges and worked with women in hospitals, urban communities and prisons.

In 2020, Raina and the Gracia Raina Foundation collaborated with Yuva Unstoppable on a project covering 34 schools in Ghaziabad. The initiative included improved drinking-water facilities, separate toilets, hand-washing facilities and smart classrooms. The foundation also donated ration kits to 500 mothers from underprivileged backgrounds and planned to extend its adolescent reproductive and sexual health programme to the participating schools.

=== Business ventures and investments ===
Since June 2023, Raina has owned and operated *Raina Indian Restaurant* in Bos en Lommer, Netherlands, which specializes in authentic Indian cuisine and regional dishes from across India. Aside from his culinary ventures, Raina has worked as an angel investor, funding early-stage startups across sectors including financial technology, Web3, and digital lifestyle assets.

== Career Statistics ==
=== Franchise ===
Team	Season	IPL		CLT20		Total	
Team	Season	Matches	Runs	Matches	Runs	Matches	Runs
Chennai Super Kings	2008	14	421	—	—	14	421
Chennai Super Kings	2009	14	434	—	—	14	434
Chennai Super Kings	2010	16	528	6	161	22	689
Chennai Super Kings	2011	16	438	5	203	21	641
Chennai Super Kings	2012	18	441	4	33	22	474
Chennai Super Kings	2013	17	548	4	79	21	627
Chennai Super Kings	2014	16	523	6	109	22	632
Chennai Super Kings	2015	17	374	Cancelled		17	374
Chennai Super Kings	2018	15	445	Cancelled		15	445
Chennai Super Kings	2019	17	383	Cancelled		17	383
Chennai Super Kings	2021	12	160	Cancelled		12	160
Gujarat Lions	2016	15	399	—	—	15	399
Gujarat Lions	2017	14	442	—	—	14	442
Total		205	5528	25	585	230	6113

== Playing style ==
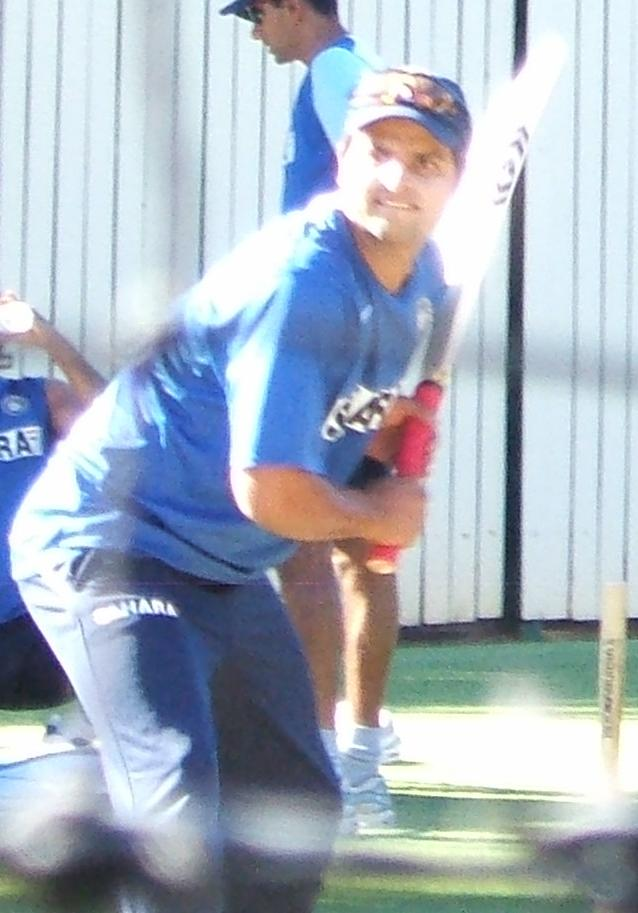
Suresh Raina batting at Adelaide Oval

Raina is an attacking middle order left handed batter. His favourite scoring area is mid wicket on the leg side. He plays inside out off drive shot frequently. While trying to hit an inside out off side shot, he creates room for himself. He is particularly strong on the leg side, where he employs a wide array of shots, including the flick, pull, and slog sweep. He has weakness against short pitched balls and throughout his career, opposition teams tried to exploit this weakness. Also in Ranji trophy he has struggled against short balls. He has been widely criticised for his short ball weakness. He is a part time off break bowler.

In addition to his batting and part time bowling, Raina is an exceptional fielder, renowned for his agility, sharp reflexes and throwing accuracy. He is often stationed in the inner ring, saving runs and effecting crucial run-outs. Former South African Cricketer Jonty Rhodes has ranked Suresh Raina as Number 1 in his 'top fielders' list.

== Honours ==
=== Team ===
India

- ICC Cricket World Cup: 2011
- ICC Champions Trophy: 2013
- ICC T20 World Cup runner-up: 2014
- Asia Cup: 2010, 2016

India U19

- Under-19 Asia Cup: 2003

Chennai Super Kings

- Indian Premier League: 2010, 2011, 2018, 2021
- Champions League T20: 2010, 2014

Deccan Gladiators

- Abu Dhabi T10: 2022

== Achievements ==
- Raina scored 120 runs on his Test debut against Sri Lanka in July 2010, becoming the 12th Indian to score a century on Test debut.
- He was the first Indian player to score 6000 as well as 8000 runs in his Twenty20 career.
- He is the first Indian player to score a century in International T20 and Champions League Twenty20.
- He is the first ever cricketer to reach 5,000 runs in IPL.
- He holds the record of most no.of catches (107) in the IPL.
- He is the second after Chris Gayle and first Indian player to hit 100 sixes in the IPL.
- He is the highest run scorer in the CLT20 (842 runs)
- He holds the record for scoring the most fifties in Champions League T20 history(6)
- He holds the record for the most runs scored in the powerplay in an IPL match

== In popular culture ==
- Raina was featured in the 2019 documentary series Roar of the Lion, which followed the Chennai Super Kings' comeback season.
- In 2015, Raina sang a song for the Hindi film Meeruthiya Gangsters.
- In 2010, Raina and Harbhajan Singh recreated the famous Titanic pose while in Galle, Sri Lanka.

== See also ==
- List of cricketers with centuries in all international formats
- List of centuries scored on Test cricket debut
