= New Zealand cricket team in Sri Lanka in 2012–13 =

| | Sri Lanka | New Zealand |
- Dates: 30 October 2012 – 29 November 2012
| Captains | Mahela Jayawardene | Ross Taylor |

Test series
- Result: 2-match series drawn 1–1
| Most runs | Angelo Mathews (210) | Ross Taylor (243) |
| Most wickets | Rangana Herath (20) | Tim Southee (12) |
- Player of the series: Rangana Herath (Sri)

One Day International series
- Results: Sri Lanka won the 5-match series 3–0
| Most runs | Tillakaratne Dilshan (139) | BJ Watling (166) |
| Most wickets | Jeevan Mendis (5) | Tim Southee (5) |
- Player of the series: BJ Watling (NZ)

Twenty20 International series
- Results: 1-match series drawn 0–0

The New Zealand national cricket team toured Sri Lanka from 30 October 2012 to 29 November 2012. The tour consisted of two Test matches, five One Day Internationals and one Twenty20 International matches. Sri Lanka Cricket moved the second and third ODIs against New Zealand from the R. Premadasa Stadium in Colombo to the Pallekele Cricket Stadium, because the Premadasa was flooded after three weeks of monsoon rain.

== Squads ==
| Tests | | ODIs | | T20Is | |
| Sri Lanka | New Zealand | Sri Lanka | New Zealand | Sri Lanka | New Zealand |

== Venues ==
All matches were played at the following four grounds:

| Pallekele | Colombo | Hambantota |
|---|---|---|
| Pallekele Cricket Stadium | R. Premadasa Stadium | Mahinda Rajapaksa Stadium |
| Capacity: 35,000 | Capacity: 35,000 | Capacity: 35,000 |
| Colombo | New Zealand cricket team in Sri Lanka in 2012–13 is located in Sri Lanka | |
| P Sara Oval | New Zealand cricket team in Sri Lanka in 2012–13 is located in Sri Lanka | |
| Capacity: 15,000 | New Zealand cricket team in Sri Lanka in 2012–13 is located in Sri Lanka | |
| Galle | New Zealand cricket team in Sri Lanka in 2012–13 is located in Sri Lanka | |
| Galle International Stadium | New Zealand cricket team in Sri Lanka in 2012–13 is located in Sri Lanka | |
| Capacity: 35,000 | New Zealand cricket team in Sri Lanka in 2012–13 is located in Sri Lanka | |

== Twenty20 Series ==
=== Only T20I ===
30 October
19:00 (D/N)
Scorecard

| Sri Lanka; 6/0 (2 overs) | v | New Zealand; 74/7 (14 overs) |
| Dilshan Munaweera 4* (4) | | Tim Southee 21* (10); Akila Dananjaya 2/9 (2 overs) |

No result
Pallekele International Cricket Stadium, Pallekele
Umpires: Ruchira Palliyaguru (SRI) and Ranmore Martinesz (SRI)

- Sri Lanka won the toss and elected to field
- The match was abandoned due to heavy rain.

== ODI series ==
=== 1st ODI ===
1 November
14:30 (D/N)
Scorecard

| Sri Lanka | v | New Zealand |

Match abandoned without a ball bowled
Pallekele International Cricket Stadium, Pallekele
Umpires: Ian Gould (Eng) and Ranmore Martinesz (SL)

- No toss.
- No play was possible due to rain.

=== 2nd ODI ===
4 November
14:30 (D/N)
Scorecard

| New Zealand; 250/6 (50 overs) | v | Sri Lanka; 118/3 (22.5 overs) |
| Ross Taylor 72 (62); Lasith Malinga 2/39 (10 overs) | | Mahela Jayawardene 43* (49); Nathan McCullum 1/12 (2.5 overs) |

Sri Lanka won by 14 runs (D/L method)
Pallekele International Cricket Stadium, Pallekele
Umpires: Ian Gould (Eng) and Kumar Dharmasena (SL)
Player of the match: Lasith Malinga (SL)

- New Zealand won the toss and elected to bat.
- Match was stopped by rain after 22.5 overs of Sri Lankan innings and no further play was possible.
- Colombo ODIs moved to Pallekele

=== 3rd ODI ===
6 November
14:30 (D/N)
Scorecard

| New Zealand; 188/6 (33 overs) | v | Sri Lanka; 200/3 (31.1 overs) |
| BJ Watling 96* (88); Jeevan Mendis 2/34 (5 overs) | | Tillakaratne Dilshan 102* (95); Nathan McCullum 1/28 (5 overs) |

Sri Lanka won by 7 wickets (D/L method)
Pallekele International Cricket Stadium, Pallekele
Umpires: Ian Gould (Eng) and Kumar Dharmasena (SL)
Player of the match: Tillakaratne Dilshan (SL)

- Sri Lanka won the toss and elected to field.
- Rain interrupted play and reduced the match to 33 overs per side.
- Colombo ODIs moved to Pallekele

=== 4th ODI ===
10 November
14:30 (D/N)
Scorecard

| New Zealand; 131/8 (32 overs) | v | Sri Lanka; 131/3 (26.2 overs) |
| Brendon McCullum 30 (44); Jeevan Mendis 3/15 (4 overs) | | Dinesh Chandimal 43 (65); Andrew Ellis 1/23 (6 overs) |

Sri Lanka won by 7 wickets (D/L method)
Mahinda Rajapaksa International Stadium, Hambantota
Umpires: Ian Gould (Eng) and Ruchira Palliyaguruge (SL)
Player of the match: Jeevan Mendis (SL)

- Sri Lanka won the toss and elected to field.
- Rain interrupted play and reduced the match to 32 overs per side.

=== 5th ODI ===
21 November
14:30 (D/N)
Scorecard

| Sri Lanka; 123/8 (28.3 overs) | v | New Zealand |
| Upul Tharanga 60 (94); Tim Southee 3/18 (5.3 overs) |

No result
Mahinda Rajapaksa International Stadium, Hambantota
Umpires: Ian Gould (Eng) and Tyron Wijewardene (SL)

- New Zealand won the toss and elected to field.
- Rain interrupted play after 28.3 overs of the Sri Lankan innings and no further play was possible.
- Akila Dananjaya (SL) made his ODI debut.

== Test series ==
=== 1st Test ===
17–21 November
Scorecard

| New Zealand | v | Sri Lanka |
| 221 (82.5 overs); Brendon McCullum 68 (125); Rangana Herath 5/65 (30 overs) | | 247 (80.2 overs); Mahela Jayawardene 91 (176); Tim Southee 4/46 (18 overs) |
| 118 (44.1 overs); Daniel Flynn 20 (60); Rangana Herath 6/43 (18 overs) | | 93/0 (18.3 overs); Dimuth Karunaratne 60* (60) |

Sri Lanka won by 10 wickets
Galle International Stadium, Galle
Umpires: Marais Erasmus (SA) and Nigel Llong (Eng)
Player of the match: Rangana Herath (SL)

- New Zealand won the toss and elected to bat.
- Dimuth Karunaratne (SL) made his Test debut.

=== 2nd Test ===
25–29 November
Scorecard

| New Zealand | v | Sri Lanka |
| 412 (153 overs); Ross Taylor 142 (306); Rangana Herath 6/103 (49 overs) | | 244 (94 overs); Thilan Samaraweera 76 (167); Tim Southee 5/62 (22 overs) |
| 194/9d (54 overs); Ross Taylor 74 (95); Rangana Herath 3/67 (21 overs) | | 195 (85.5 overs Angelo Mathews 84 (228); Trent Boult 3/33 (17.5 overs) |

New Zealand won by 167 runs
P Sara Oval, Colombo
Umpires: Marais Erasmus (SA) and Nigel Llong (Eng)
Player of the match: Ross Taylor (NZ)

- New Zealand won the toss and elected to bat.
- Todd Astle (NZ) made his Test debut.
