= Jacob Bethell =

English cricketer (born 2003)

Personal information
- Full name: Jacob Graham Bethell
- Born: 23 October 2003 (age 23); Bridgetown, Barbados
- Height: 5 ft 10 in (178 cm)
- Batting: Left-handed
- Bowling: Slow left-arm orthodox
- Role: Batting all-rounder
- Relatives: Arthur Bethell (grandfather)

International information
- National side: England (2024–present)
- Test debut (cap 718): 28 November 2024 v New Zealand
- Last Test: 25 June 2026 v New Zealand
- ODI debut (cap 275): 19 September 2024 v Australia
- Last ODI: 19 July 2026 v India
- T20I debut (cap 102): 11 September 2024 v Australia
- Last T20I: 11 July 2026 v India

Domestic team information
- Years: Team
- 2021–present: Warwickshire
- 2022: → Gloucestershire (on loan)
- 2022: Welsh Fire
- 2023–present: Birmingham Phoenix
- 2024/25: Melbourne Renegades
- 2025–present: Royal Challengers Bengaluru

Career statistics
Competition	Test	ODI	T20I	FC
Matches	9	24	36	31
Runs scored	579	712	786	1,439
Batting average	34.05	33.90	30.23	28.78
100s/50s	1/4	1/6	1/4	1/10
Top score	154	110	105	154
Balls bowled	388	346	93	1,642
Wickets	8	9	8	18
Bowling average	31.87	47.77	16.87	59.50
5 wickets in innings	0	0	0	0
10 wickets in match	0	0	0	0
Best bowling	3/26	2/33	4/11	4/20
Catches/stumpings	11/–	4/–	18/–	28/–
- Source: Cricinfo, 19 July 2026

Jacob Graham Bethell (born 23 October 2003) is an English cricketer who plays for the England cricket team. He made his international debut in September 2024 against Australia at the Rose Bowl, Southampton and became England's youngest ever captain when led the Twenty20 International side against Ireland in September 2025. In domestic cricket, Bethell represents Warwickshire and Birmingham Phoenix, and in the Indian Premier League he plays for Royal Challengers Bengaluru.

== Early life ==
Bethell was born in Barbados before moving to the United Kingdom aged 12 to attend boarding school. His father, Graham, attended King Edward VI school in Southampton in the 1990s. His family has had a long involvement with cricket and his grandfather, Arthur Bethell, played first-class cricket for Barbados. He is a British citizen through his father.

Educated first at Harrison College in Barbados, Bethell played age-group cricket. He was player of the tournament in the West Indies Under-15 competition in 2017. By this stage he had already earned a scholarship at Rugby School, where he was coached by the former Warwickshire captain Mike Powell who was the school's Director of Cricket. In 2021, he scored 202 in the first innings of Rugby's annual two-day fixture against Marlborough College, a modern-day record.

== Domestic career ==
Bethell played age-group cricket for Warwickshire sides, and signed a three-year professional contract with them in January 2021. Former Warwickshire captain and England cricketer Ian Bell described him as "the best 17-year old" he had ever seen. He made his List A debut in the 2021 One-Day Cup, for Warwickshire against Glamorgan at Sophia Gardens, Cardiff on 22 July, and his first-class debut on 12 September 2021 against Yorkshire at Headingley in the County Championship.

In April 2022, Welsh Fire paid £30,000 to add Bethell to their squad for the second season of the Hundred. In July 2023, he was drafted in The Hundred by the Birmingham Phoenix.

He took his maiden first-class wicket on 15 April 2024 at Edgbaston, for Warwickshire against Durham in the County Championship.

In November 2024, Bethell was signed by Indian Premier League side Royal Challengers Bengaluru for the 2025 tournament, where he made two appearances. He was retained by the team for the 2026 season.

In Australia, on 19 December 2024, he made his Big Bash League debut for Melbourne Renegades.

== International career ==
In September 2021, Bethell was named as the joint-captain of the England under-19 cricket team for their series against the West Indies. Bethell was named vice-captain of England's team for the 2022 ICC Under-19 Cricket World Cup in the West Indies, where he scored 88 from 42 balls in the side's quarterfinal victory over South Africa. In December 2022, he was selected for the England U-19s to play Australia in January 2023, under head coach Michael Yardy.

Bethell made his senior international debut at Southampton on 11 September 2024, in the first game of a three-match T20I series against Australia. In the second fixture at Cardiff on 14 September, he scored a "match-winning" 44 from 24 balls. On 28 October, he was named in the Test squad for England's tour of New Zealand in November and December. He subsequently made his Test match debut against New Zealand on 28 November 2024 and scored 50 not out off 37 balls in England's second innings as they won by eight wickets. This was the joint second-fastest debut Test half-century by an England batter.

In August 2025, Bethell was named T20I captain of the England team for their series against Ireland, becoming the youngest ever player to captain England. On 7 September 2025, Bethell scored his first professional century against South Africa in the third ODI at the Rose Bowl, finishing on 110. His century was reached from 76 balls, 16 of which were boundaries.

On 7 January 2026, he scored 154 runs off 265 balls in the third innings of the fifth Ashes Test at the Sydney Cricket Ground, registering his maiden Test and first-class century.

On 3 February 2026, Bethell registered his career-best T20I figures of 4/11 as England successfully defended a total of 128 to complete T20I series whitewash against Sri Lanka. Bethell was part of England's 2026 ICC T20 World Cup squad. On 5 March 2026, he scored 105 runs off just 48 balls against India at the Wankhede in a high scoring semi-final of the 2026 T20 World Cup. Bethell's century made him the fourth England player to score at least one century in all three international cricket formats. He also became the first male cricketer to score each of his maiden centuries in first-class, List A and T20 cricket in international matches. Bethell also became the youngest player ever to score a century in all three international formats (Test, ODI, and T20I).

== International Centuries ==
List of Test centuries scored by Jacob Bethell
No.	Score	Opponent	Venue	Date	Result	Ref
1	154	Australia	Sydney Cricket Ground, Sydney	4 January 2026	Loss	

=== One Day International centuries ===
No.	Runs	Balls	Opponent	Venue	Date	Result
1	110	82	South Africa	Rose Bowl, Southampton	7 September 2025	Won

=== Twenty20 International Centuries ===
No.	Runs	Balls	Opponent	Venue	Date	Result
1	105	48	India	Wankhede Stadium, Mumbai	5 March 2026	Loss
