= List of cricketers with centuries in all international formats =

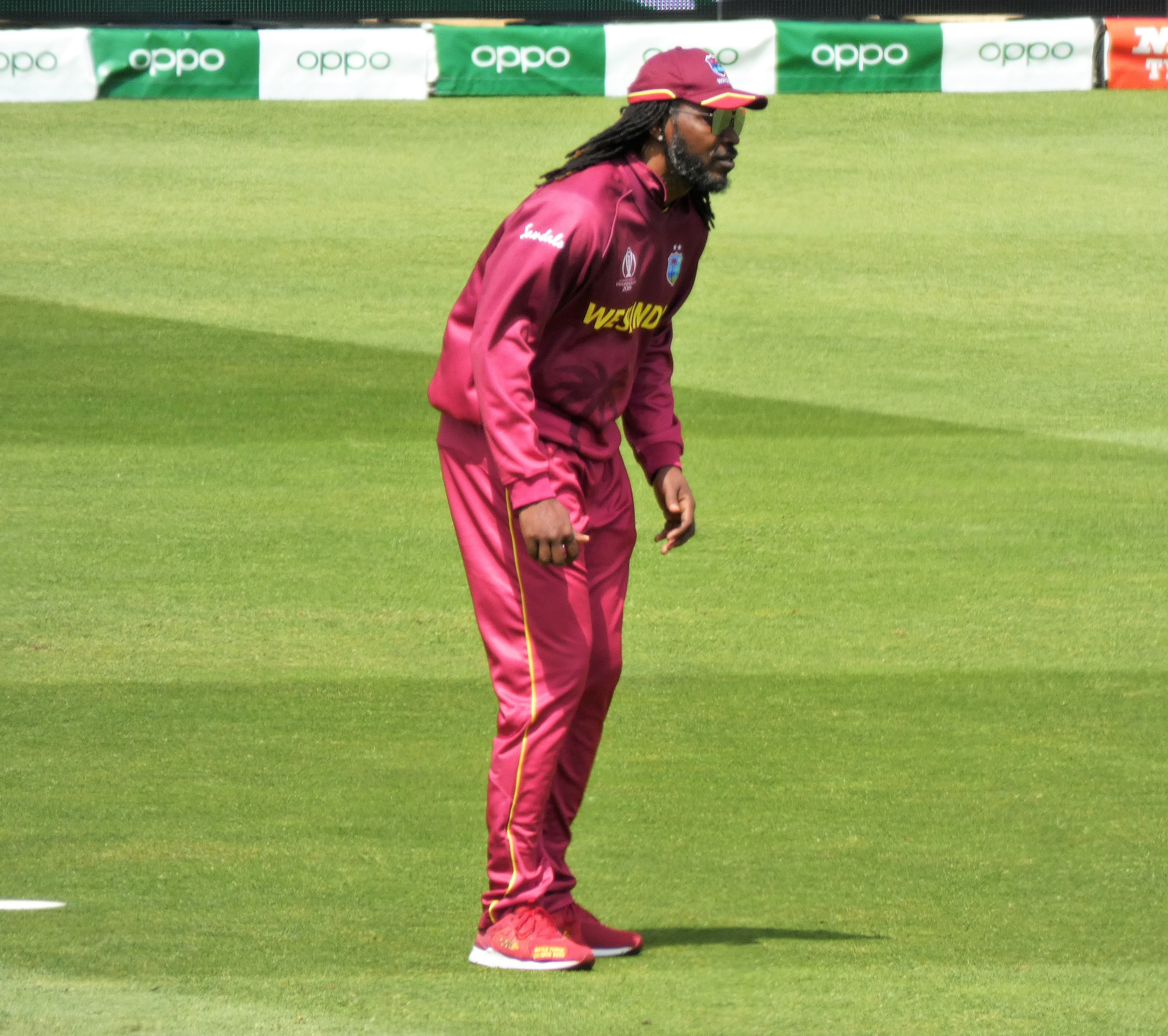
Chris Gayle was the first player to score a century in all three international formats, doing so in 2007.

In cricket, a player is said to have scored a century when they score 100 or more runs in a single innings. There are three international cricket formats - Test, One Day (ODI) and Twenty20 (T20I). Scoring a century in any format is regarded as a landmark score; completing the feat in all three international formats is considered a significant milestone by the cricket community and media. The first Twenty20 International match was held on 5 August 2004, so players whose careers finished before this date cannot appear on this list.

The first player to score centuries in all international formats was Chris Gayle of the West Indies in 2007, who achieved the feat by scoring the first century in T20I cricket. He had notched the Test component of the feat in July 2001 against Zimbabwe with an innings of 175, and the ODI component in August of the same year against Kenya with an innings of 152.

Every International Cricket Council (ICC) full member team, except Afghanistan, has had at least one player score centuries in all international formats. (Note: The teams are Australia, England, South Africa, India, New Zealand, West Indies, Pakistan, Sri Lanka, Zimbabwe, Bangladesh, Ireland and Afghanistan.) As of October 2026, the feat has been accomplished by 41 players; 36 men and 5 women. India has the most players who have completed the feat with eight players; seven men and one woman, followed by Australia with six; five men and one woman, England with six; four men and two women, and Sri Lanka with four; four men. The most recent player to accomplish the feat was Shreyas Iyer of India in October 2026.

== Key ==
Key	Description
*	denotes that the batter remained not out
†	indicates that the player is still an active international cricketer

== Men's international cricket ==
As of 6 October 2026

No.	Completion Date	Player	Period	Team	First Test century	First ODI century	First T20I century	Test total	ODI total	T20I total	Total
1	11 September 2007	Chris Gayle	1999–2021	West Indies	175 vs Zimbabwe, Jul 2001	152 vs Kenya, Aug 2001	117 vs South Africa, Sep 2007	15	25	2	42
2	28 February 2010	Brendon McCullum	2002–2016	New Zealand	143 vs Bangladesh, Oct 2004	166 vs Ireland, Jul 2008	116* vs Australia, Feb 2010	12	5	2	19
3	3 May 2010	Mahela Jayawardene	1997–2015	Sri Lanka	167 vs New Zealand, Jun 1998	120 vs England, Jan 1999	100 vs Zimbabwe, May 2010	34	19	1	54
4	26 July 2010	Suresh Raina	2005–2018	India	120 vs Sri Lanka, Jul 2010	101 vs Hong Kong, Jun 2008	101 vs South Africa, May 2010	1	5	1	7
5	6 August 2011	Tillakaratne Dilshan	1999–2016	Sri Lanka	163* vs Zimbabwe, Nov 1999	117* vs Netherlands, Jul 2006	104* vs Australia, Aug 2011	16	22	1	39
6	23 December 2012	Martin Guptill	2009–2022	New Zealand	189 vs Bangladesh, Feb 2010	122* vs West Indies, Jan 2009	101* vs South Africa, Dec 2012	3	18	2	23
7	30 March 2014	Ahmed Shehzad	2009–2019	Pakistan	147 vs Sri Lanka, Jan 2014	115 vs New Zealand, Feb 2011	111* vs Bangladesh, Mar 2014	3	6	1	10
8	11 January 2015	Faf du Plessis	2011–2021	South Africa	110* vs Australia, Nov 2012	106 vs Australia, Aug 2014	119 vs West Indies, Jan 2015	10	12	1	23
9	2 October 2015	Rohit Sharma †	2007–present	India	177 vs West Indies, Nov 2013	114 vs Zimbabwe, May 2010	106 vs South Africa, Oct 2015	12	35	5	52
10	31 January 2016	Shane Watson	2002–2016	Australia	120* vs Pakistan, Dec 2009	126 vs West Indies, Jun 2008	124* vs India, Jan 2016	4	9	1	14
11	13 March 2016	Tamim Iqbal	2007–2023	Bangladesh	128 vs West Indies, Jul 2009	129 vs Ireland, Mar 2008	103* vs Oman, Mar 2016	10	14	1	25
12	27 August 2016	KL Rahul †	2014–present	India	110 vs Australia, Jan 2015	100* vs Zimbabwe, Jun 2016	110* vs West Indies, Aug 2016	13	9	2	24
13	15 March 2017	Glenn Maxwell †	2012–2026	Australia	104 vs India, Mar 2017	102 vs Sri Lanka, Mar 2015	145* vs Sri Lanka, Sep 2016	1	4	5	10
14	7 October 2019	Kevin O'Brien	2006–2021	Ireland	118 vs Pakistan, May 2018	142 vs Kenya, Feb 2007	124 vs Hong Kong, Oct 2019	1	2	1	4
15	27 October 2019	David Warner	2009–2024	Australia	123* vs New Zealand, Dec 2011	163 vs Sri Lanka, Mar 2012	100* vs Sri Lanka, Oct 2019	26	22	1	49
16	11 February 2021	Mohammad Rizwan †	2015–present	Pakistan	115* vs South Africa, Feb 2021	115 vs Australia, Mar 2019	104* vs South Africa, Feb 2021	3	4	1	8
17	14 April 2021	Babar Azam †	2015–present	Pakistan	127* vs New Zealand, Nov 2018	120 vs West Indies, Sep 2016	122 vs South Africa, Apr 2021	9	20	3	32
18	1 November 2021	Jos Buttler †	2011–present	England	106 vs India, Aug 2018	121 vs Sri Lanka, May 2014	101* vs Sri Lanka, Nov 2021	2	11	2	15
19	17 June 2022	Dawid Malan	2017–2024	England	140 vs Australia, Dec 2017	125 vs Netherlands, Jun 2022	103* vs New Zealand, Nov 2019	1	4	1	6
20	8 September 2022	Virat Kohli †	2008–present	India	116 vs Australia, Jan 2012	107 vs Sri Lanka, Dec 2009	122* vs Afghanistan, Sep 2022	30	54	1	85
21	1 February 2023	Shubman Gill †	2019–present	India	110 vs Bangladesh, Dec 2022	130 vs Zimbabwe, Aug 2022	126* vs New Zealand, Feb 2023	11	11	1	23
22	26 March 2023	Quinton de Kock †	2012–present	South Africa	129* vs England, Jan 2016	112 vs Pakistan, Nov 2013	100 vs West Indies, Mar 2023	6	23	2	31
23	24 April 2023	Paul Stirling †	2008–present	Ireland	103 vs Sri Lanka, Apr 2023	177 vs Canada, Sep 2010	115* vs Zimbabwe, Sep 2021	1	14	1	16
24	23 October 2024	Sikandar Raza †	2013–present	Zimbabwe	127 vs Sri Lanka, Jul 2017	141 vs Afghanistan, Jul 2014	133* vs Gambia, Oct 2024	1	7	1	9
25	2 January 2025	Kusal Perera †	2013–present	Sri Lanka	110 vs Zimbabwe, Oct 2016	106 vs Bangladesh, Feb 2014	101 vs New Zealand, Jan 2025	2	6	1	9
26	22 February 2025	Josh Inglis †	2022–present	Australia	102 vs Sri Lanka, Jan 2025	120* vs England, Feb 2025	110 vs India, Nov 2023	2	2	2	6
27	25 July 2025	Shai Hope †	2015–present	West Indies	147 vs England, Aug 2017	101 vs Zimbabwe, Nov 2016	102* vs Australia, Jul 2025	5	21	3	29
28	26 September 2025	Pathum Nissanka †	2021–present	Sri Lanka	103 vs West Indies, Mar 2021	137 vs Australia, Jun 2022	107 vs India, Sep 2025	4	7	2	13
29	28 September 2025	Brendan Taylor †	2004–present	Zimbabwe	105* vs Bangladesh, Aug 2011	118* vs Bangladesh, Nov 2009	123 vs Botswana, Sep 2025	8	11	1	20
30	30 September 2025	Brian Bennett †	2023–present	Zimbabwe	110* vs Afghanistan, Dec 2024	169 vs Ireland, Feb 2025	111 vs Tanzania, Sep 2025	3	1	1	5
31	4 October 2025	Mitchell Marsh †	2011–present	Australia	181 vs England, Dec 2017	102* vs India, Jan 2016	103* vs New Zealand, Oct 2025	3	4	1	8
32	6 December 2025	Yashasvi Jaiswal †	2023–present	India	171 vs West Indies, Jul 2023	116* vs South Africa, Dec 2025	100 vs Nepal, Oct 2023	7	1	1	9
33	24 February 2026	Harry Brook †	2022–present	England	153 vs Pakistan, Dec 2022	110* vs Australia, Sep 2024	100 vs Pakistan, Feb 2026	10	4	2	16
34	5 March 2026	Jacob Bethell †	2024–present	England	154 vs Australia, Jan 2026	110 vs South Africa, Sep 2025	105 vs India, Mar 2026	1	1	1	3
35	18 June 2026	Glenn Phillips †	2017–present	New Zealand	100 vs England, Jun 2026	106* vs Pakistan, Feb 2025	108 vs West Indies, Nov 2020	2	2	3	7
36	6 October 2026	Shreyas Iyer †	2017–present	India	105 vs New Zealand, Nov 2021	103 vs New Zealand, Feb 2020	102* vs West Indies, Oct 2026	1	5	1	7

== Women's international cricket ==
As of 28 June 2025

No.	Completion Date	Player	Period	Team	First Test century	First ODI century	First T20I century	Test total	ODI total	T20I total	Total
1	26 February 2020	Heather Knight	2010–2026	England	157 vs Australia, Aug 2013	106 vs Pakistan, Jun 2017	108* vs Thailand, Feb 2020	2	3	1	6
2	22 June 2023	Tammy Beaumont	2009–2026	England	208 vs Australia, Jun 2023	104 vs Pakistan, Jun 2016	116 vs South Africa, Jun 2018	1	12	1	14
3	28 June 2024	Laura Wolvaardt †	2016–present	South Africa	122 vs India, Jul 2024	105 vs Ireland, Aug 2016	102 vs Sri Lanka, Mar 2024	1	13	4	18
4	30 January 2025	Beth Mooney †	2016–present	Australia	106 vs England, Jan 2025	100 vs New Zealand, Feb 2017	117* vs England, Nov 2017	1	6	2	9
5	28 June 2025	Smriti Mandhana †	2013–present	India	127 vs Australia, Sep 2021	102 vs Australia, Feb 2016	112 vs England, Jun 2025	2	14	2	18

== See also ==
- List of cricketers by number of international centuries scored
- List of cricketers who have scored centuries in both innings of a Test match
