= 2009 Deccan Chargers season =

Indian Premier League cricket team season

Deccan Chargers
2009 season
- Coach: Darren Lehmann
- Captain: Adam Gilchrist
- Ground(s): Rajiv Gandhi International Cricket Stadium, Hyderabad (Capacity: 55,000) (Note: Matches for the 2009 IPL were shifted to South Africa with the home matches being played at multiple stadiums.)
- IPL: Champions
- CLT20: Group Stage
- Most runs: Adam Gilchrist (564)
- Most wickets: R. P. Singh (26)
- Most catches: Herschelle Gibbs (11)
- Most wicket-keeping dismissals: Adam Gilchrist (21)

The Deccan Chargers (DC) were a franchise cricket team based in Hyderabad, India, that competed in the Indian Premier League (IPL), a professional Twenty20 cricket (T20) league in India. They were one of the eight teams that competed in the 2009 Indian Premier League, making their second appearance in all IPL tournaments. The team was captained by Adam Gilchrist and coached by Darren Lehmann with Kanwaljit Singh and Mike Young as assistant coaches.

They began their season by winning their opening fixture of the IPL on 19 April against the Kolkata Knight Riders, and went on to qualify for the semi-finals. They beat the Delhi Daredevils in the semi-final to reach the Final. They defeated the Royal Challengers Bangalore in the Final by six runs to win their maiden IPL trophy and qualify for the 2009 Champions League Twenty20 (CLT20). They lost both their matches in the group stage of the CLT20 and failed to advance to the league stage.

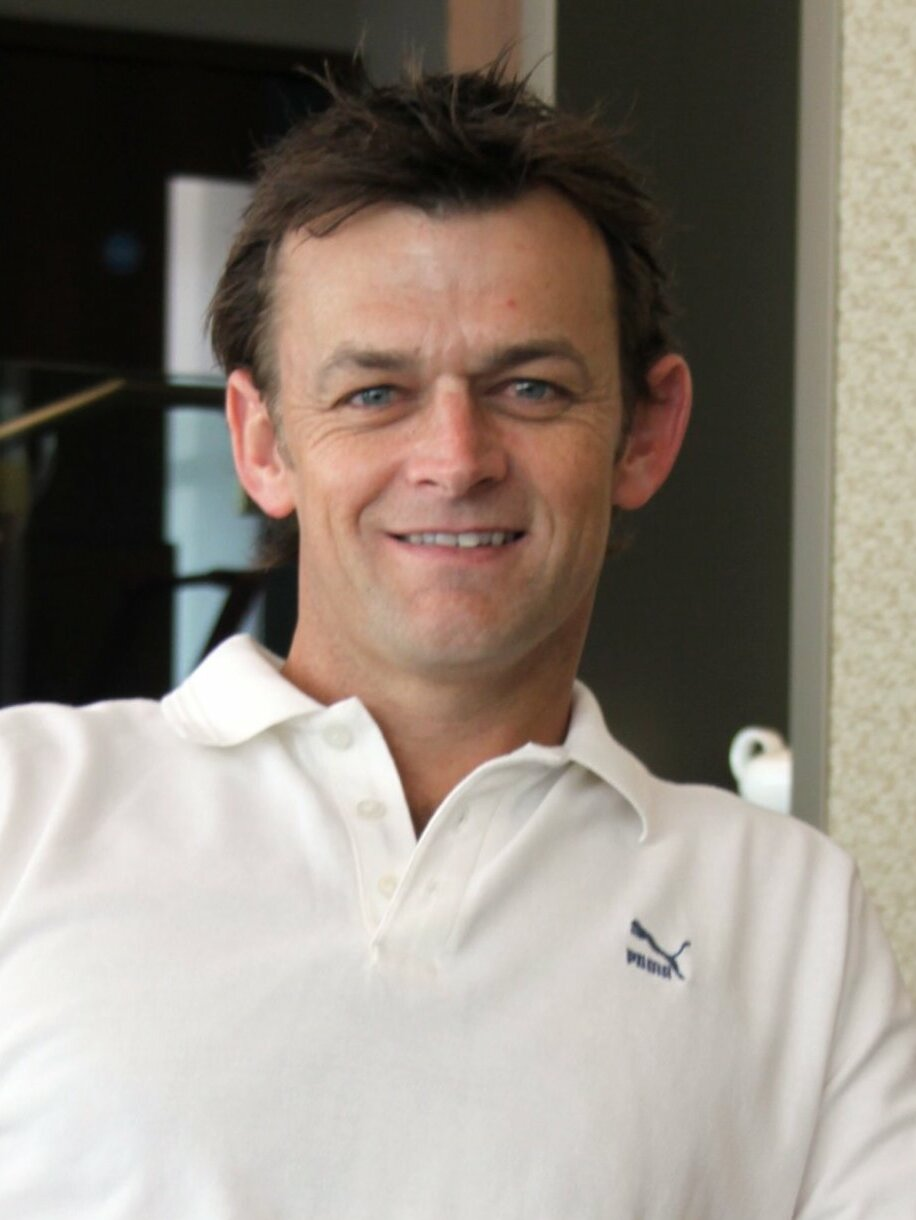
Adam Gilchrist was appointed as the captain of the Deccan Chargers for the 2009 IPL

== Background ==
The Deccan Chargers were one of the most expensive teams of the Indian Premier League and they also spent a large amount of money on players during the auction but finished at the bottom of the table winning only two of their 14 matches. After finishing last in the league stage of the 2008 Indian Premier League, the team management sacked the entire administration associated with the tournament in that year. They removed their CEO J. Kalyan Krishnan, the coach Robin Singh and the captain V.V.S. Laxman and replaced them with Tim Wright, the former Australian batsman Darren Lehmann and the Australian wicket-keeper Adam Gilchrist respectively. The Jaypee Group, who sponsored the team in 2008, withdrew its funding owing to the team's poor performances in that season. This allowed the Deccan Chargers to undergo a complete makeover, including changing the colours of the team from pale brown to vibrant blue and a new logo displaying a more vivid charging bull with the Deccan Chronicle as the primary sponsor for the team.

In the aftermath of the 2009 attack on the Sri Lanka national cricket team in Pakistan, there has been a growing concern over the security arrangements for the 2009 Indian Premier League (IPL) in India with many international players inquiring the franchises over their safety and asking for an independent security assessment. However, due to the direct clash of the IPL matches with the 2009 Indian general elections, the Government of India refused to provide the paramilitary forces during the games with the Home Minister, P. Chidambaram reiterating, “Elections are unquestionably first priority over the IPL.” On 24 March 2009, Board of Control for Cricket in India announced that the IPL was to be held in South Africa and had decided to compensate the franchises for the extra expenditure they would incur in moving the team from India for this season.

== Player acquisition ==
The IPL added a performance clause to its player's contract which saw the players lose 20% of their match fee if they did not find a place in starting XI on a match-by-match basis. However, this clause was applicable only on the contracts signed from 2009. The players' purchase cap was also increased from US$5 million to US$7 million. The maximum number of foreign players in each squad was also increased from eight to ten, though those in playing XI was still retained at four. The IPL also announced that the players' auction was shifted to 6 February 2009 while the month-long trading window would start on 15 December 2008.

The Deccan Chargers conducted the probe and later, terminated the contract of the Pakistani all-rounder Shahid Afridi following the disagreement between Afridi and then captain, V. V. S. Laxman, on the poor first-season performances. The entire issue started when Afridi spoke to Geo News, a Pakistani news channel, about Laxman's inefficiency as the captain and suggesting Gilchrist as the better choice. Laxman later responded later by saying that Afridi had no team ethics and reminding him of being the part of a collective failure and was unfortunate for blaming only the captain for it. The Deccan Chargers traded Sanjay Bangar to the Kolkata Knight Riders for the second season during the trade window. They started acquiring players as their new coach, Darren Lehmann, signed the uncapped Australian all-rounder Ryan Harris and obtained local talent by signing the Hyderabadi batsman Tirumalasetti Suman along with the Himachal Pradesh wicket-keeper Manvinder Bisla. They also added five uncapped players from the domestic circuit to the squad including the local players, Abhinav Kumar and Shoaib Ahmed.

The players auction for the 2009 Indian Premier League was held on 6 February 2009 at Goa that included 111 overseas players. The Deccan Chargers opened their account by buying the West-Indian fast bowler Fidel Edwards at the base price of US$150,000 to bolster their pace attack. Later, they improved their batting strength by acquiring the services of another West-Indian, Dwayne Smith, at the base price of US$100,000.

Players retained: Halhadar Das, Kalyankrishna Doddapaneni, Ravi Teja Dwaraka, Herschelle Gibbs, Adam Gilchrist, Sarvesh Kumar, Pragyan Ojha, Vijaykumar Paidikalva, Rohit Sharma, Chamara Silva, R. P. Singh, Scott Styris, Andrew Symonds, V. V. S. Laxman, Chaminda Vaas, Arjun Yadav, Venugopal Rao Yalaka, Nuwan Zoysa

Players released: Shahid Afridi, Sanjay Bangar

Players added: Shoaib Ahmed, Harmeet Singh Bansal, Azhar Bilakhia, Manvinder Bisla, Fidel Edwards, Ryan Harris, Abhinav Kumar, Jaskaran Singh, Dwayne Smith, Suman Tirumalasetti

== Squad ==
- Players with international caps are listed in **bold**.
- **Year signed** denotes the season the player first signed for the team

Name	Nationality	Birth date	Batting style	Bowling style	Year signed	Notes
Batsmen
Azhar Bilakhia	India	31 May 1986 (aged 22)	Right-handed	Right-arm medium fast	2009	
Ravi Teja Dwaraka	India	5 September 1988 (aged 20)	Right-handed	Right-arm leg break	2008	
**Herschelle Gibbs**	South Africa	23 February 1974 (aged 35)	Right-handed	Right-arm medium fast	2008	Overseas. Played for the Cape Cobras in the 2009 CLT20.
**Rohit Sharma**	India	30 April 1987 (aged 21)	Right-handed	Right-arm off break	2008	Vice Captain.
Suman Tirumalasetti	India	15 December 1983 (aged 25)	Right-handed	Right-arm off break	2009	
**Chamara Silva**	Sri Lanka	14 December 1979 (aged 29)	Right-handed	Right-arm leg spin	2008	Overseas.
**V. V. S. Laxman**	India	1 November 1974 (aged 34)	Right-handed	Right-arm off spin	2008	
Arjun Yadav	India	23 December 1981 (aged 27)	Right-handed	Right-arm off break	2008	
**Venugopal Rao Yalaka**	India	26 February 1982 (aged 27)	Right-handed	Right-arm off spin	2008	
All-rounders
Ryan Harris	Australia	11 October 1979 (aged 29)	Right-handed	Right-arm fast	2009	Overseas. Withdrew from the 2009 CLT20 tournament.
**Dwayne Smith**	West Indies	12 April 1983 (aged 26)	Right-handed	Right-arm medium fast	2009	Overseas. Played for the Sussex Sharks in the 2009 CLT20.
**Scott Styris**	New Zealand	10 July 1975 (aged 33)	Right-handed	Right-arm medium fast	2008	Overseas.
**Andrew Symonds**	Australia	9 June 1975 (aged 33)	Right-handed	Right-arm off break	2008	Overseas.
Wicket-keepers
Manvinder Bisla	India	27 December 1984 (aged 24)	Right-handed		2009	
Halhadar Das	India	10 December 1986 (aged 22)	Right-handed		2008	
**Adam Gilchrist**	Australia	14 November 1971 (aged 37)	Left-handed	Right-arm off break	2008	Overseas and captain.
Abhinav Kumar	India	7 November 1984 (aged 24)	Right-handed		2009	Replacement to Ryan Harris in the 2009 CLT20 squad.
Bowlers
Shoaib Ahmed	India	19 November 1987 (aged 21)	Right-handed	Right-arm medium fast	2009	
Harmeet Singh Bansal	India	9 October 1987 (aged 21)	Right-handed	Right-arm medium fast	2009	
Kalyankrishna Doddapaneni	India	16 December 1983 (aged 25)	Right-handed	Right-arm medium fast	2008	
**Fidel Edwards**	West Indies	6 February 1982 (aged 27)	Right-handed	Right-arm fast	2009	Overseas.
Sarvesh Kumar	India	26 April 1989 (aged 19)	Right-handed	Right-arm medium fast	2008	
**Pragyan Ojha**	India	5 September 1986 (aged 22)	Left-handed	Slow left-arm orthodox	2008	
Vijaykumar Paidikalva	India	20 October 1986 (aged 22)	Right-handed	Right-arm medium fast	2008	
Jaskaran Singh	India	4 September 1989 (aged 19)	Right-handed	Right-arm medium fast	2009	
**R. P. Singh**	India	6 December 1985 (aged 23)	Right-handed	Left-arm medium fast	2008	
**Chaminda Vaas**	Sri Lanka	27 January 1974 (aged 35)	Left-handed	Left-arm medium fast	2008	Overseas.
**Nuwan Zoysa**	Sri Lanka	13 May 1978 (aged 30)	Left-handed	Left-arm medium fast	2008	Overseas.

== Administration and support staff ==
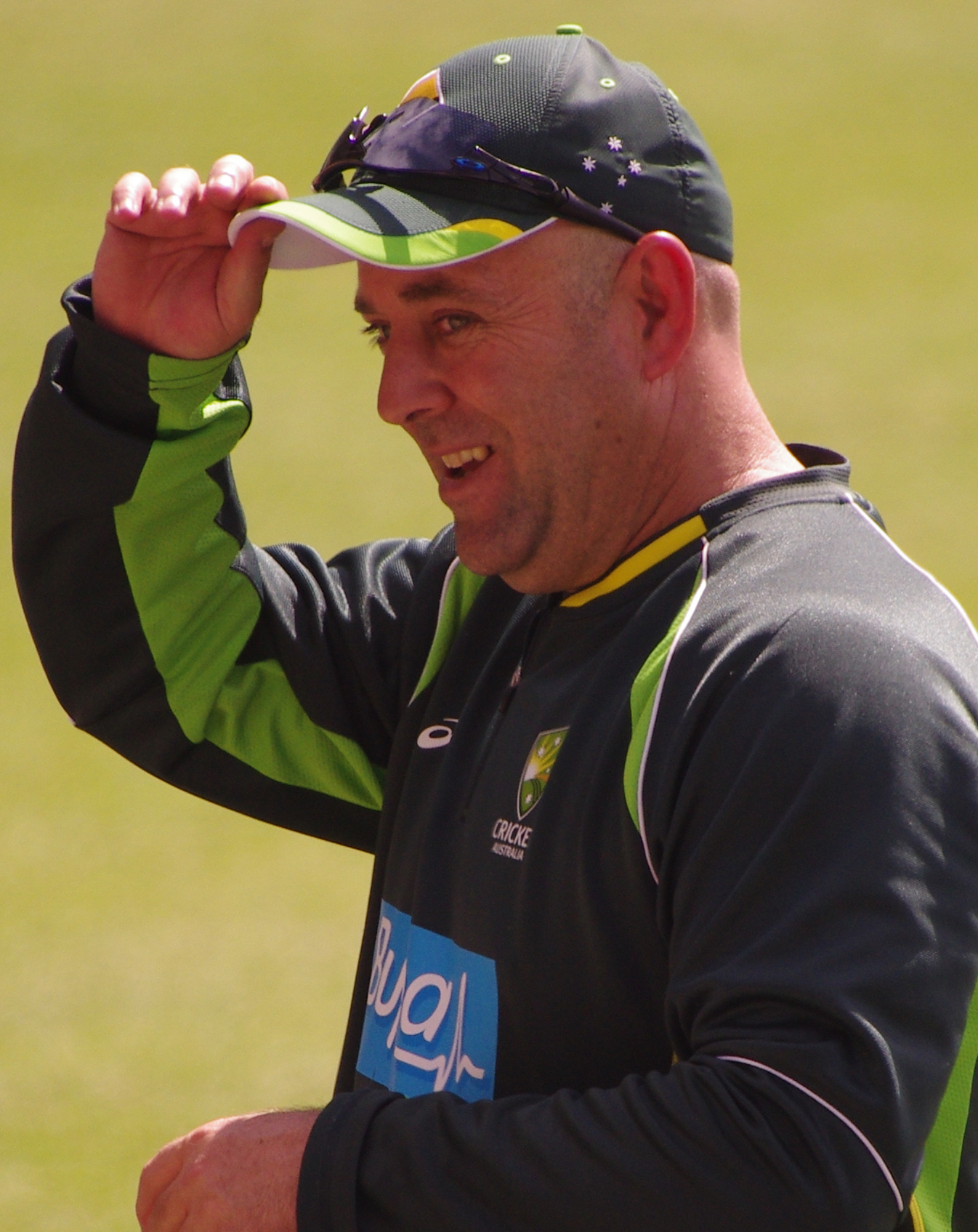
Darren Lehmann (Head coach)

Position	Name
Owner	Deccan Chronicle
Head coach	Darren Lehmann
Assistant coach	Kanwaljit Singh
Bowling coach	Vincent Barnes
Fielding coach	Mike Young
Physiotherapist	Sean Slattery
Strength and Conditioning coach	Steve Smith

== Kit manufacturers and sponsors ==
Kit Manufacturers	Shirt Sponsor (Chest)	Shirt Sponsor (Back)
Puma	Deccan Chronicle	Odyssey
Source :

T20 uniform

== Season overview ==
=== Indian Premier League ===
The Indian Premier League fixtures were announced on 24 March 2009 with all venues shifted to South Africa. The opening games of the IPL were scheduled on 18 April with the top-four teams from the group stage advancing to the knockout stage and the final scheduled to be held in the Johannesburg on 24 May.

==== Group stage ====
On 19 April, the Deccan Chargers started their 2009 Indian Premier League (2009 IPL) campaign with an eight-wicket win over the Kolkata Knight Riders at Cape Town. The Chargers rested Chaminda Vaas and named Adam Gilchrist, Herschelle Gibbs, Scott Styris and Fidel Edwards as their four foreign players for their first match. Though they lost the toss and were sent out to field, their opening bowling attack consisting of Edwards and R. P. Singh troubled the Knight Riders' top-order batsmen with the new ball removing three quick wickets. Pragyan Ojha troubled the middle-order but Brad Hodge scored a couple of boundaries off Styris to keep the scoreboard running before slamming one straight to Gibbs at point. Singh returned into the attack to remove the tail and restrict the Knight Riders to 101. Gilchrist started the chase for the Chargers with a couple of boundaries before they lost two quick wickets. Gibbs, who then teamed up with Rohit Sharma, steadied their innings with some quick singles and watchful boundaries before the pair finished off the game with seven overs to spare.

The Deccan Chargers defeated the Royal Challengers Bangalore for their second consecutive win of the season on 22 April. The Chargers retained the same starting XI for the second match after their comfortable win against the Knight Riders. After winning the toss and electing to bat, Gilchrist took the charge of the innings with clean hitting necessitating continuous fielding changes from the opposition. Praveen Kumar managed to remove Gibbs after changing ends and V. V. S. Laxman failed to make an impact again. Gilchrist, however continued his scoring, especially picking on short deliveries as he reached his half century in 31 balls. Rohit, who started off slowly on the other end, paced himself soon after Gilchrist got dismissed attacking Anil Kumble for three sixes over the mid-wicket which helped Chargers finish the innings at 184/6 in 20 overs. The Royal Challengers got a poor start in their chase stumbling to 62/4 in 11 overs before Rahul Dravid teamed up with Virat Kohli to progress the Royal Challengers' chase as the latter scored 50 off 32 balls. However, the target seemed too far the Royal Challengers as the Chargers completed their win by 24 runs.

On 25 April, the Deccan Chargers completed a hat-trick of wins this season as they defeated the Mumbai Indians. The Chargers made one change in this match with Styris being rested and Dwayne Smith taking his place. Gilchrist chose to bat after winning the toss and provided a quick start along with Gibbs for the opening wicket scoring at a rate of 10 per over. After Gilchrist's dismissal, Gibbs kept the momentum going as he teamed up with Smith to attack the Mumbai bowlers. Though the Chargers suffered a middle-order collapse soon after the loss of Smith's wicket, they were able to finish the innings at 168/9 in 20 overs. Singh provided a good start to the Chargers in the Mumbai innings removing Sanath Jayasuriya in his first over. However, Sachin Tendulkar teamed up with J. P. Duminy as they build a partnership of 84 runs in nine overs. Ojha pulled the Chargers back into the match removing three quick wickets. Abhishek Nayar joined Dwayne Bravo to progress the chase for the Mumbai but Edwards dismissing the both ended the match for the Mumbai as the Chargers won the match by 12 runs.

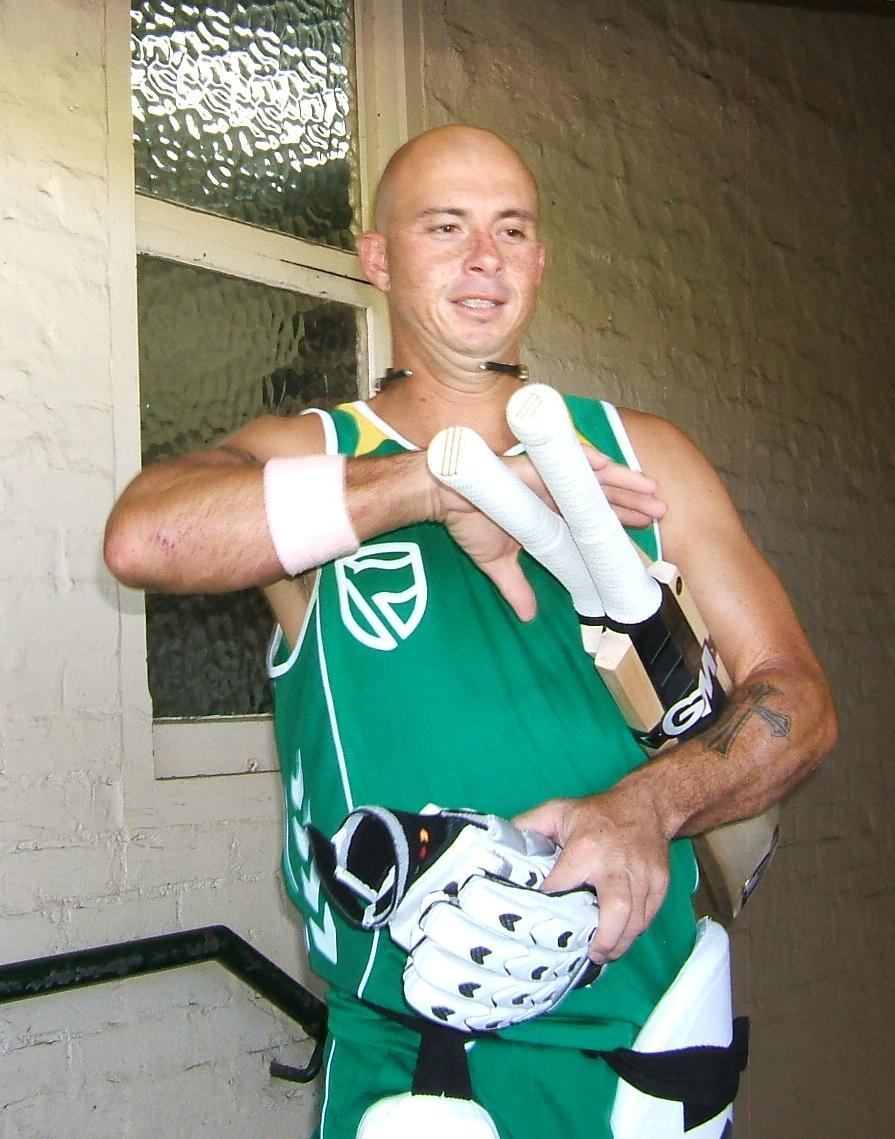
Herschelle Gibbs won the Man of the Match award during the win against the Chennai Super Kings

On 27 April, the Deccan Chargers continued their winning ways defeating the 2008 tournament finalist, Chennai Super Kings. Gilchrist won the toss and elected to field as the Chargers made two changes replacing Dwaraka Ravi Teja and Harmeet Singh Bansal with Azhar Bilakhia and Shoaib Ahmed. Edwards removed Parthiv Patel on the second ball of the innings but Matthew Hayden paired with Suresh Raina to attack the Chargers' bowlers and remove the pressure off the Super Kings during their 64-run partnership. Ojha removed Hayden and M. S. Dhoni in a single over but quick scoring from Jacob Oram helped the Super Kings finish the innings at 165/6. Gilchrist started the chase positively for the Chargers as he attacked Lakshmipathy Balaji in the first over and Gibbs soon joined the party attacking Manpreet Gony in the next over as they both put 67 runs in 34 balls. Though the Chargers lost two quick wickets, the early momentum by Gilchrist and the steady half century from Gibbs helped the Chargers complete their chase with six wickets remaining.

On 30 April, the Deccan Chargers suffered their first defeat of the season to the Delhi Daredevils. The Chargers made one change resting Laxman and Tirumalasetti Suman was brought into the squad. After losing the toss and sent out to bat, the Chargers lost both their openers inside the power-play to Dirk Nannes while the Daredevils' spinners stalled the brief Chargers' recovery led by Rohit. But, Smith teamed with Suman as both scored runs of 51 off three overs to reclaim the advantage for the Chargers as they finished the innings at 148/9 in 20 overs. Virender Sehwag started the chase on a positive note for the Daredevils but Singh and Shoaib brought the Chargers back into the game with three quick wickets. Dinesh Karthik and Tillakaratne Dilshan played sensibly in the middle overs for the Daredevils offering no chances to the bowlers as they sealed the match for the Daredevils.

On 2 May, the Rajasthan Royals prevailed over the Deccan Chargers in a close contest. The Chargers were unchanged for this match. Gilchrist won the toss and elected to bat but the Royals spinners stopped the early momentum of the Chargers removing three wickets and not allowing them to score freely in the first ten overs. Rohit and Suman tried to build the Chargers innings with a 59-run stand and helped the Chargers finish the innings at 141/5 in 20 overs. The Chargers' bowlers provided the early break-through as they removed three wickets inside two overs. Then Ravindra Jadeja and Lee Carseldine added 51 runs in seven overs before Venugopal Rao removed the both in the same over. Shane Warne and Abhishek Raut batted patiently rotating the strike as they took the Royals towards their target. Yusuf Pathan, after Warne's dismissal, made a final assault on the Chargers bowlers and finished the game for the Royals as they defeated the Chargers by three wickets.

On 4 May, the Deccan Chargers suffered a hat-trick of defeats as they lost to the Chennai Super Kings by 78 runs. Dhoni won the toss and elected to bat for the Super Kings as the Chargers made two changes with Laxman coming back into the team and Ryan Harris replacing Edwards who left the squad for the West Indies tour of England. Hayden and Murali Vijay provided a good start for the Super Kings and Dhoni, who promoted himself to No.3, continued the momentum by stopping the bowlers to settle in the innings. Though the Chargers hit back with Vijay's dismissal off Suman, Raina attacked him for three consecutive boundaries as the Super Kings finished the innings at 178/3 in 20 overs. The Chargers suffered the early setback as they lost three wickets for one run in two overs. Smith and Rohit progressed the Chargers towards the target as they put up a 50-run stand in 21 balls. Dhoni introduced Shadab Jakati who removed both the set batsmen and the dismissal of Suman by Muttiah Muralitharan triggered the lower-order collapse as the Chargers were bowled for 100 runs inside 15 overs.

On 6 May, the Deccan Chargers completed their double with a win over the Mumbai Indians. The Chargers made two changes with Ravi Teja replacing Laxman and Harmeet replacing Ojha. Gilchrist won the toss and elected to bat for the Chargers but lost Gibbs to an away-swinger from Dhawal Kulkarni. Gilchrist tried to build the partnership with Suman but both lost their wickets while trying to improve the run-rate. But, Rohit and Smith in the middle and Venugopal in the end helped the Chargers finish the innings at 145/6 in 20 overs. Singh attacked the Mumbai batsmen early in their innings removing their openers in his first over for the Chargers. Duminy built a partnership with Pinal Shah for the Mumbai and improved his pace after Shah's dismissal attacking Harmeet and Harris to bring the Mumbai near to their target. But the poor shot selection by the Mumbai batsmen in the end and the hat-trick from Rohit helped the Chargers seal the match by 19 runs.

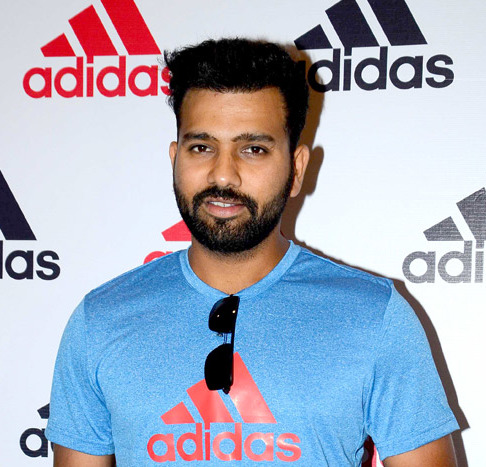
Rohit Sharma took the hat-trick in the match against the Mumbai Indians

On 9 May, the Deccan Chargers lost to Kings XI Punjab in a closely fought contest. The Chargers made two changes with Andrew Symonds, who returned to the squad following the Australian tour of the UAE, replacing Smith and Ojha coming back into the team to replace Harmeet. After losing the toss and put to bat, the Chargers got a quick start from Gilchrist. Though they lost Gilchrist, Suman came in to attack Irfan Pathan right from the start for a six. The Chargers suffered a mini-collapse in their mid-innings but Symonds played a big innings as he reached his half century off 29 balls and helped the Chargers finish the innings at 168/5 in 20 overs. The Kings' openers gave a good start of 44 in four overs but lost both their wickets in the span of three balls to Rohit. Yuvraj Singh and Kumar Sangakkara continued the momentum for the Kings but Ojha and Suman brought the game back into the Chargers' favour. Mahela Jayawardene kept the Kings in the game with three successive sixes before Brett Lee finished off the match for the Kings.

On 11 May, the Deccan Chargers dropped Gibbs and Harris as their replacements, Smith and Vaas helped the Chargers win over the Rajasthan Royals by 53 runs. Gilchrist won the toss for the Chargers and elected to bat but the Royals spinners controlled the innings early as they did not allow the Chargers batsmen to score freely. Symonds tried to build the innings for Chargers but fell to Warne. Smith got off to a quiet start but later attacked the Royals until his departure in the final over for 47 as he helped the Chargers score 69 runs in last six overs and finish the innings at 166/7 in 20 overs. The Royals' collapse began in the second over as they lost two quick wickets to Vaas. Naman Ojha tried to build the innings with two fours but got run-out as he misjudged the single at the point. Swapnil Asnodkar on the other end failed to get the support from his teammates as he eventually fell for 44 off 39 balls. Rohit took three wickets in the end as the Chargers bowled out the Royals for 113 runs.

The Deccan Chargers lost to the Delhi Daredevils by 13 runs on 13 May. Gilchrist won the toss and elected to field for the Chargers as he named an unchanged team for this match. Vaas removed David Warner early in the innings but the catches dropped by the fielders proved to be costly as both Dilshan and AB de Villiers capitalised on their chances and attacked their bowlers. Dinesh Karthik further added to their score with his 23-ball 44 as this helped the Daredevils finish the innings at 173/7 in 20 overs. The Chargers lost Suman and Rohit cheaply but Gilchrist kept the Chargers in the hunt with his 33-ball 64. Symonds batted smartly mixing sixes with the singles as he took the Chargers further close to their target. But, Rajat Bhatia helped the Daredevils win the match as the Chargers lost six wickets for 12 runs in their last three overs. The Daredevils became the first team to secure their place in the semi-finals with this win.

On 16 May, Rohit helped the team score 26 runs in the last over of the match as the Deccan Chargers completed the double over the Kolkata Knight Riders. The 26 runs scored in that over is the most runs scored off the last over to win an IPL match. It was also the first time in IPL history that a six had been hit off the final ball of a match to win and Rohit's first six of the over, measured at 115m is 9th longest in IPL history. Three changes were made by the Chargers as Gibbs, Harmeet and Harris came back into the team replacing Smith, Shoaib and Vaas. Gilchrist won the toss and elected to field. Brendon McCullum provided a quick start for the Knight Riders but his dismissal slowed the innings as Saurav Ganguly and Hodge could not keep the momentum going as they struggled to score quickly. In the end, it was David Hussey who started attacking the bowlers for the Knight Riders in the penultimate over which was started by Singh but ended by Harmeet after the former was removed for bowling two above waist-high full-tosses. This helped the Knight Riders finish the innings at 160/5 in 20 overs. Gilchrist provided a quick start for the Chargers but the introduction of the spin slowed the scoring as the Chargers lost Gilchrist. Suman and Symonds helped the Chargers move towards their target but both got run-out in the end. It all came down to 21 runs in the last over when Rohit took on Mashrafe Mortaza to finish the match for the Chargers with a six on the last ball.

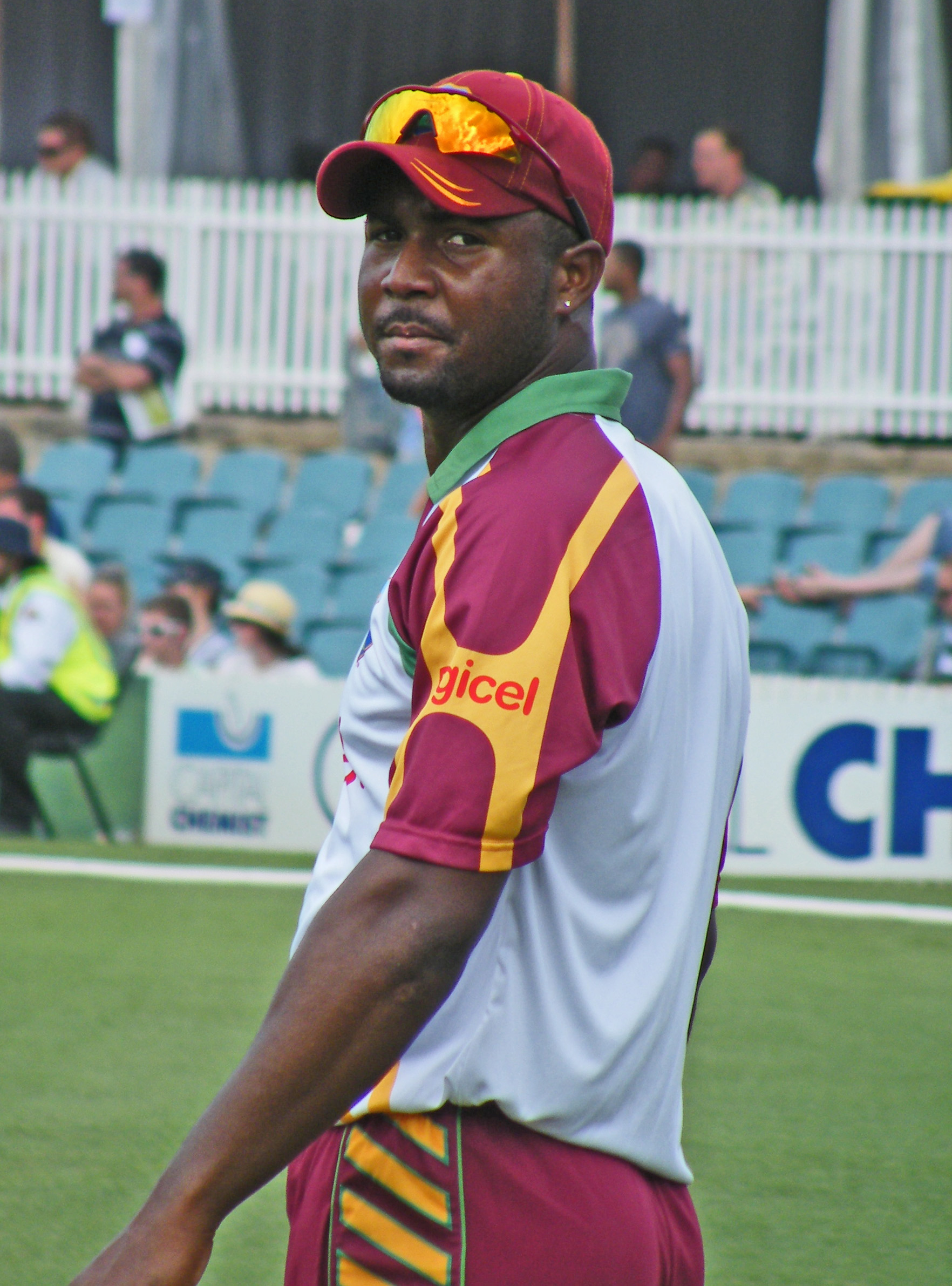
Dwayne Smith won the Man of the Match award during the win against the Rajasthan Royals

On 17 May, Yuvraj's second hat-trick of this IPL helped the Kings XI Punjab win over the Deccan Chargers by one run. Gilchrist won the toss and elected to field as Jaskaran Singh replaced Harmeet in the team. The Kings' batsmen lost their wickets quickly with some tight bowling from the Chargers as they were struggling at 55/4 in ten overs. Sangakkara built the Kings' innings with Yuvraj as he played patiently in the beginning and started to attack in the end as he helped the Kings finish the innings at 134/7 in 20 overs. Gilchrist provided the quick start for the Chargers but Ramesh Powar turned things around as he dismissed Gilchrist and Suman off successive deliveries. The Kings' spinners did not allow the Chargers to come back into the game as Yuvraj's hat trick collapsed the Chargers' innings in the middle. Though Rohit tried to bring down the target with two sixes and a four, his dismissal to Pathan in the last over ended the game for the Chargers.

On 21 May, the Royal Challengers Bangalore defeated the Deccan Chargers to book their place in the semi-finals. Gilchrist lost the toss and the Chargers were sent out to field. Bilakhia came back into the team as Ravi Teja was left out owing to his hamstring injury. Singh removed Jacques Kallis early in the innings but the drop of Manish Pandey proved costly as he went on to become the first Indian to score an IPL century. Roelof van der Merwe provided the support at the other end as Pandey attacked the bowlers as he reached his century in the 17th over. He finally helped the Royal Challengers finish the innings at 170/4 in 20 overs. Gilchrist struggled during the Chargers' innings but Gibbs attacked the bowlers as they built 68 runs in 6.5 overs. After Gibbs' dismissal, the Royal Challengers' spinners controlled the innings with Kumble taking 2 wickets and van der Merwe taking a wicket. The Chargers' batsmen could not increase their scoring rate as they eventually lost to the Royal Challengers by 12 runs.

==== Semi-final ====
On 22 May, Gilchrist's fastest fifty helped the Deccan Chargers defeat the table toppers, Delhi Daredevils in the semi-finals to reach the Final of the 2009 IPL. Gilchrist won the toss and elected to field as Harmeet replaced Jaskaran in the team. Harris provided the first break-through for the Chargers as he removed both the openers in the first over of the innings. Sehwag built the partnership with Dilshan for the Daredevils as they scored 83 runs in nine overs until Symonds broke the partnership. The Chargers bowlers put the pressure on the Daredevils as the tight bowling helped restrict the Daredevils to 153/8 in 20 overs. Gilchrist started the chase for the Chargers with five boundaries in the first over off Nannes. Though Ashish Nehra removed Gibbs on the other end, he continued to attack the bowlers as he completed his half century in 17 balls, the fastest in the IPL. He launched on Sehwag for three sixes scoring 25 runs in his only over. He finally fell for Mishra but his knock of 85 in 35 balls completely shifted the match towards the Chargers as Suman and Rohit completed the match in the 18th over. This also helped the Chargers to qualify for the 2009 Champions League Twenty20 (2009 CLT20).

==== Final ====
On 24 May, the Deccan Chargers lifted the IPL trophy for the first time as they defeated the Royal Challengers Bangalore by 6 runs in the final. Kumble won the toss and sent out the Chargers to bat who fielded the unchanged playing XI for the final. The Chargers had a poor start as Kumble removed Gilchrist in the first over and the Chargers lost Suman in third over. Gibbs built crucial partnerships with Symonds and Rohit but Kumble came back to bowl on both occasions to break the partnership. Gibbs could not pace the scoring for the Chargers as they finished the innings at 143/6 in 20 overs. The Chargers started their bowling aggressively as Singh removed Kallis but van der Merwe attacked their opening bowlers. Gilchrist introduced Ojha after the power-play who rewarded him with two wickets including van der Merwe. The Chargers bowlers continued to put pressure on the Royal Challengers as they took the regular wickets. Though Ross Taylor and Robin Uthappa tried to bring the target down, Singh and Harris retained their composure in the final overs of the match to help the Chargers restrict the Royal Challengers to 137/9 in 20 overs.

=== Champions League Twenty20 ===
The Champions League Twenty20 fixtures were announced on 30 July 2009 with the Deccan Chargers placed in the Group A along with the Trinidad and Tobago (T&T), the 2008 Stanford 20/20 winners and the Somerset Sabres, the 2009 Twenty20 Cup runners-up. The group matches were scheduled to be played in Hyderabad from 10 October with the top-two teams advancing to the league stage. The Deccan Chargers announced the 15-man squad for the 2009 CLT20 without Gibbs and Smith as they opted not to play for the Chargers. Harris later withdrew from the tournament as Abhinav Kumar replaced him in the squad.

==== Group stage ====
On 10 October, the Deccan Chargers lost to the Somerset by one wicket in their opening group match of the CLT20. Without Gibbs, Smith and Harris in the squad, they named Gilchrist, Symonds, Styris and Edwards as the team's four foreign players. Gilchrist lost the toss and the Chargers were put to bat. The Chargers lost their captain early in the innings as Gilchrist lost his wicket trying to score fast early in the innings. Laxman starred for the Chargers with his uncharacteristic knock though they lost their top-order on the other end as the batsmen struggled to keep their score running. Venugopal Rao rescued the Chargers in the end as his 22-run knock in 12 balls helped the Chargers finish at 153/9 in 20 overs. The Chargers bowlers kept pressure on the Somerset taking wickets at regular intervals. James Hildreth and Alfonso Thomas scored boundaries to keep the Somerset in the chase until Styris bowled Hildreth in the last over. But, Alfonso retained his composure and completed the chase for the Somerset.

On 14 October, the Deccan Chargers lost their second group match against T&T to crash out of the CLT20. Gilchrist won the toss and elected to field as Abhinav Kumar replaced Harmeet in the team. The Chargers bowlers conceded many extras aiding T&T batting though Edwards got Lendl Simmons in the third over. Singh too erred in his line and length as he bowled a hat-trick of front-foot no-balls in his second over as T&T raced to 49/1 in 5 overs. Gilchrist introduced Suman who removed Darren Bravo and Symonds' direct-hit to remove Darren Ganga helped the Chargers come back into the match. Kieron Pollard tried to pace the innings but the Chargers were able to restrict T&T to 149/7 in 20 overs. Though Gilchrist provided a quick start to the Chargers, they lost 3 wickets on the other end inside five overs. Gilchrist tried to build the partnership with Rohit for the fourth wicket but losing both batsmen in three deliveries put T&T back on the top. Venugopal Rao tried to bring the victory for the chargers with two fours and two sixes but his dismissal in the 18th over off Ravi Rampaul helped T&T win the match by 3 runs.

== Competitions ==
=== Indian Premier League ===
==== Summary ====
===== Group stage =====
====== Standings ======
Pos	Team	Pld	W	L	NR	Pts	NRR
1	Delhi Daredevils	14	10	4	0	20	0.311
2	Chennai Super Kings	14	8	5	1	17	0.951
3	Royal Challengers Bangalore (R)	14	8	6	0	16	−0.191
4	Deccan Chargers (C)	14	7	7	0	14	0.203
5	Kings XI Punjab	14	7	7	0	14	−0.483
6	Rajasthan Royals	14	6	7	1	13	−0.352
7	Mumbai Indians	14	5	8	1	11	0.297
8	Kolkata Knight Riders	14	3	10	1	7	−0.789

Source: Full table on ESPNcricinfo

(C) = Eventual champion; (R) = Runner-up.
Winner, runner-up and best-performing semi-finalist in the group stage qualify for the 2009 Champions League Twenty20.

====== Results by match ======
Round	1	2	3	4	5	6	7	8	9	10	11	12	13	14
Ground	H	H	H	A	H	H	H	A	H	A	A	A	A	A
Result	W	W	W	W	L	L	L	W	L	W	L	W	L	L
Position	1	1	1	1	1	1	2	2	4	3	3	3	3	4

Source: Fixtures
A = Away; H = Home; W = Win; D = Draw; L = Loss

===== Knockout stage =====
====== Brackets ======
Semifinals
22 May — SuperSport Park, Centurion
1	Delhi Daredevils	153/8 (20 overs)
4	Deccan Chargers	154/4 (17.4 overs)
23 May — New Wanderers Stadium, Johannesburg
2	Chennai Super Kings	146/5 (20 overs)
3	Royal Challengers Bangalore	149/4 (18.5 overs)

Final
24 May — New Wanderers Stadium, Johannesburg
4	Deccan Chargers	143/6 (20 overs)
3	Royal Challengers Bangalore	137/9 (20 overs)

==== Fixtures ====
All times are in Indian Standard Time (UTC+05:30). Subtract 3.5 hours for local time in South Africa.

===== Group stage =====
19 April	Kolkata Knight Riders; 101 (19.4 overs)	v	Deccan Chargers (H); 104/2 (13.1 overs)	Deccan Chargers won by 8 wickets
22:20 (D/N) Round 1 Scorecard	Kolkata Knight Riders; 101 (19.4 overs)	v	Deccan Chargers (H); 104/2 (13.1 overs)	Newlands, Cape Town; Umpires: Mark Benson and Billy Doctrove; Player of the match: R. P. Singh (Deccan Chargers)
22:20 (D/N) Round 1 Scorecard	Brad Hodge 31 (34); R.P. Singh 4/22 (3.4 overs)		Herschelle Gibbs 43* (26); Ashok Dinda 1/24 (3 overs)	Newlands, Cape Town; Umpires: Mark Benson and Billy Doctrove; Player of the match: R. P. Singh (Deccan Chargers)
Kolkata Knight Riders won the toss and elected to bat.				Newlands, Cape Town; Umpires: Mark Benson and Billy Doctrove; Player of the match: R. P. Singh (Deccan Chargers)

22 April	(H) Deccan Chargers; 184/6 (20 overs)	v	Royal Challengers Bangalore; 160/8 (20 overs)	Deccan Chargers won by 24 runs
20:00 (D/N) Round 2 Scorecard	(H) Deccan Chargers; 184/6 (20 overs)	v	Royal Challengers Bangalore; 160/8 (20 overs)	Newlands, Cape Town; Umpires: Marais Erasmus and Amiesh Saheba; Player of the match: Adam Gilchrist (Deccan Chargers)
20:00 (D/N) Round 2 Scorecard	Adam Gilchrist 71 (45); Kevin Pietersen 2/31 (4 overs)		Virat Kohli 50 (32); Scott Styris 3/32 (4 overs)	Newlands, Cape Town; Umpires: Marais Erasmus and Amiesh Saheba; Player of the match: Adam Gilchrist (Deccan Chargers)
Deccan Chargers won the toss and elected to bat.				Newlands, Cape Town; Umpires: Marais Erasmus and Amiesh Saheba; Player of the match: Adam Gilchrist (Deccan Chargers)

25 April	(H) Deccan Chargers; 168/9 (20 overs)	v	Mumbai Indians; 156/7 (20 overs)	Deccan Chargers won by 12 runs
16:00 Round 3 Scorecard	(H) Deccan Chargers; 168/9 (20 overs)	v	Mumbai Indians; 156/7 (20 overs)	Kingsmead, Durban; Umpires: Kumar Dharmasena and Simon Taufel; Player of the match: Pragyan Ojha (Deccan Chargers)
16:00 Round 3 Scorecard	Herschelle Gibbs 58 (44); Lasith Malinga 3/19 (4 overs)		Jean-Paul Duminy 47 (40); Pragyan Ojha 3/21 (4 overs)	Kingsmead, Durban; Umpires: Kumar Dharmasena and Simon Taufel; Player of the match: Pragyan Ojha (Deccan Chargers)
Deccan Chargers won the toss and elected to bat.				Kingsmead, Durban; Umpires: Kumar Dharmasena and Simon Taufel; Player of the match: Pragyan Ojha (Deccan Chargers)

27 April	(H) Chennai Super Kings; 165/6 (20 overs)	v	Deccan Chargers; 169/4 (20 overs)	Deccan Chargers won by 6 wickets
16:00 Round 4 Scorecard	(H) Chennai Super Kings; 165/6 (20 overs)	v	Deccan Chargers; 169/4 (20 overs)	Kingsmead, Durban; Umpires: Shashank Ranade and Tyron Wijewardene; Player of the match: Herschelle Gibbs (Deccan Chargers)
16:00 Round 4 Scorecard	Matthew Hayden 49 (35); Pragyan Ojha 2/11 (2 overs)		Herschelle Gibbs 69* (56); Suresh Raina 2/18 (4 overs)	Kingsmead, Durban; Umpires: Shashank Ranade and Tyron Wijewardene; Player of the match: Herschelle Gibbs (Deccan Chargers)
Deccan Chargers won the toss and elected to field.				Kingsmead, Durban; Umpires: Shashank Ranade and Tyron Wijewardene; Player of the match: Herschelle Gibbs (Deccan Chargers)

30 April	(H) Deccan Chargers; 148/9 (20 overs)	v	Delhi Daredevils; 150/4 (18.4 overs)	Delhi Daredevils won by 6 wickets
16:00 Round 5 Scorecard	(H) Deccan Chargers; 148/9 (20 overs)	v	Delhi Daredevils; 150/4 (18.4 overs)	SuperSport Park, Centurion; Umpires: Gary Baxter and Amiesh Saheba; Player of the match: Dirk Nannes (Delhi Daredevils)
16:00 Round 5 Scorecard	Dwayne Smith 48 (28); Dirk Nannes 2/16 (4 overs)		Tillakaratne Dilshan 52* (46); Shoaib Ahmed 2/20 (4 overs)	SuperSport Park, Centurion; Umpires: Gary Baxter and Amiesh Saheba; Player of the match: Dirk Nannes (Delhi Daredevils)
Delhi Daredevils won the toss and elected to field.				SuperSport Park, Centurion; Umpires: Gary Baxter and Amiesh Saheba; Player of the match: Dirk Nannes (Delhi Daredevils)

2 May	(H) Deccan Chargers; 141/5 (20 overs)	v	Rajasthan Royals; 142/7 (19.4 overs)	Rajasthan Royals won by 3 wickets
16:00 Round 6 Scorecard	(H) Deccan Chargers; 141/5 (20 overs)	v	Rajasthan Royals; 142/7 (19.4 overs)	St George's Park, Port Elizabeth; Umpires: Sudhir Asnani and Brian Jerling; Player of the match: Yusuf Pathan (Rajasthan Royals)
16:00 Round 6 Scorecard	Tirumalsetti Suman 41* (35); Shane Harwood 2/25 (4 overs)		Lee Carseldine 39 (32); RP Singh 2/18 (4 overs)	St George's Park, Port Elizabeth; Umpires: Sudhir Asnani and Brian Jerling; Player of the match: Yusuf Pathan (Rajasthan Royals)
Deccan Chargers won the toss and elected to bat.				St George's Park, Port Elizabeth; Umpires: Sudhir Asnani and Brian Jerling; Player of the match: Yusuf Pathan (Rajasthan Royals)

4 May	Chennai Super Kings; 178/3 (20 overs)	v	Deccan Chargers (H); 100 (14.4 overs)	Chennai Super Kings won by 78 runs
20:00 (D/N) Round 7 Scorecard	Chennai Super Kings; 178/3 (20 overs)	v	Deccan Chargers (H); 100 (14.4 overs)	Buffalo Park, East London; Umpires: Marais Erasmus and Billy Doctrove; Player of the match: Mahendra Singh Dhoni (Chennai Super Kings)
20:00 (D/N) Round 7 Scorecard	M.S. Dhoni 58* (37); Shoaib Ahmed 1/14 (2 overs)		Dwayne Smith 49 (23); Shadab Jakati 4/22 (4 overs)	Buffalo Park, East London; Umpires: Marais Erasmus and Billy Doctrove; Player of the match: Mahendra Singh Dhoni (Chennai Super Kings)
Chennai Super Kings won the toss and elected to bat.				Buffalo Park, East London; Umpires: Marais Erasmus and Billy Doctrove; Player of the match: Mahendra Singh Dhoni (Chennai Super Kings)

6 May	Deccan Chargers; 145/6 (20 overs)	v	Mumbai Indians (H); 126/8 (20 overs)	Deccan Chargers won by 19 runs
20:00 (D/N) Round 8 Scorecard	Deccan Chargers; 145/6 (20 overs)	v	Mumbai Indians (H); 126/8 (20 overs)	SuperSport Park, Centurion; Umpires: Mark Benson and Kumar Dharmasena; Player of the match: Rohit Sharma (Deccan Chargers)
20:00 (D/N) Round 8 Scorecard	Rohit Sharma 38 (36); Dhawal Kulkarni 1/21 (4 overs)		Jean-Paul Duminy 52 (48); Rohit Sharma 4/6 (2 overs)	SuperSport Park, Centurion; Umpires: Mark Benson and Kumar Dharmasena; Player of the match: Rohit Sharma (Deccan Chargers)
Deccan Chargers won the toss and elected to bat.; Rohit Sharma became the first player from the Deccan Chargers to claim the hat-trick.				SuperSport Park, Centurion; Umpires: Mark Benson and Kumar Dharmasena; Player of the match: Rohit Sharma (Deccan Chargers)

9 May	(H) Deccan Chargers; 168/5 (20 overs)	v	Kings XI Punjab; 169/7 (19.5 overs)	Kings XI Punjab won by 3 wickets
16:00 Round 9 Scorecard	(H) Deccan Chargers; 168/5 (20 overs)	v	Kings XI Punjab; 169/7 (19.5 overs)	De Beers Diamond Oval, Kimberley; Umpires: Gary Baxter and Amiesh Saheba; Player of the match: Mahela Jayawardene (Kings XI Punjab)
16:00 Round 9 Scorecard	Andrew Symonds 60* (36); Brett Lee 1/24 (4 overs)		Mahela Jayawardene 43 (28); Rohit Sharma 2/12 (2 overs)	De Beers Diamond Oval, Kimberley; Umpires: Gary Baxter and Amiesh Saheba; Player of the match: Mahela Jayawardene (Kings XI Punjab)
Kings XI Punjab won the toss and elected to field.				De Beers Diamond Oval, Kimberley; Umpires: Gary Baxter and Amiesh Saheba; Player of the match: Mahela Jayawardene (Kings XI Punjab)

11 May	Deccan Chargers; 166/7 (20 overs)	v	Rajasthan Royals (H); 113 (19.3 overs)	Deccan Chargers won by 53 runs
20:00 (D/N) Round 10 Scorecard	Deccan Chargers; 166/7 (20 overs)	v	Rajasthan Royals (H); 113 (19.3 overs)	De Beers Diamond Oval, Kimberley; Umpires: Gary Baxter and Kumar Dharmasena; Player of the match: Dwayne Smith (Deccan Chargers)
20:00 (D/N) Round 10 Scorecard	Dwayne Smith 47 (32); Yusuf Pathan 3/34 (4 overs)		Swapnil Asnodkar 44 (39); Rohit Sharma 3/12 (3 overs)	De Beers Diamond Oval, Kimberley; Umpires: Gary Baxter and Kumar Dharmasena; Player of the match: Dwayne Smith (Deccan Chargers)
Deccan Chargers won the toss and elected to bat.				De Beers Diamond Oval, Kimberley; Umpires: Gary Baxter and Kumar Dharmasena; Player of the match: Dwayne Smith (Deccan Chargers)

13 May	(H) Delhi Daredevils; 173/7 (20 overs)	v	Deccan Chargers; 161 (19.4 overs)	Delhi Daredevils won by 12 runs
20:00 (D/N) Round 11 Scorecard	(H) Delhi Daredevils; 173/7 (20 overs)	v	Deccan Chargers; 161 (19.4 overs)	Kingsmead, Durban; Umpires: Daryl Harper and Suresh Shastri; Player of the match: Rajat Bhatia (Delhi Daredevils)
20:00 (D/N) Round 11 Scorecard	Dinesh Karthik 44* (23); Pragyan Ojha 2/26 (4 overs)		Adam Gilchrist 64 (33); Rajat Bhatia 4/15 (2.4 overs)	Kingsmead, Durban; Umpires: Daryl Harper and Suresh Shastri; Player of the match: Rajat Bhatia (Delhi Daredevils)
Deccan Chargers won the toss and elected to field.				Kingsmead, Durban; Umpires: Daryl Harper and Suresh Shastri; Player of the match: Rajat Bhatia (Delhi Daredevils)

16 May	(H) Kolkata Knight Riders; 160/5 (20 overs)	v	Deccan Chargers; 166/4 (20 overs)	Deccan Chargers won by 6 wickets
20:15 (D/N) Round 12 Scorecard	(H) Kolkata Knight Riders; 160/5 (20 overs)	v	Deccan Chargers; 166/4 (20 overs)	New Wanderers Stadium, Johannesburg; Umpires: S. Ravi and Rudi Koertzen; Player of the match: Rohit Sharma (Deccan Chargers)
20:15 (D/N) Round 12 Scorecard	Brad Hodge 48 (41); Ryan Harris 2/20 (4 overs)		Adam Gilchrist 43 (31); Murali Karthik 1/12 (4 overs)	New Wanderers Stadium, Johannesburg; Umpires: S. Ravi and Rudi Koertzen; Player of the match: Rohit Sharma (Deccan Chargers)
Deccan Chargers won the toss and elected to field.				New Wanderers Stadium, Johannesburg; Umpires: S. Ravi and Rudi Koertzen; Player of the match: Rohit Sharma (Deccan Chargers)

17 May	(H) Kings XI Punjab; 134/7 (20 overs)	v	Deccan Chargers; 133/8 (20 overs)	Kings XI Punjab won by 1 run
16:00 Round 13 Scorecard	(H) Kings XI Punjab; 134/7 (20 overs)	v	Deccan Chargers; 133/8 (20 overs)	New Wanderers Stadium, Johannesburg; Umpires: S. Ravi and Russell Tiffin; Player of the match: Yuvraj Singh (Kings XI Punjab)
16:00 Round 13 Scorecard	Kumar Sangakkara 56 (43); RP Singh 3/26 (4 overs)		Rohit Sharma 42 (26); Yuvraj Singh 3/13 (4 overs)	New Wanderers Stadium, Johannesburg; Umpires: S. Ravi and Russell Tiffin; Player of the match: Yuvraj Singh (Kings XI Punjab)
Deccan Chargers won the toss and elected to field.; Yuvraj Singh got his second hat-trick in this match and became the second person after Brett Lee to get 2 hat-tricks.				New Wanderers Stadium, Johannesburg; Umpires: S. Ravi and Russell Tiffin; Player of the match: Yuvraj Singh (Kings XI Punjab)

21 May	(H) Royal Challengers Bangalore; 170/4 (20 overs)	v	Deccan Chargers; 158/6 (20 overs)	Royal Challengers Bangalore won by 12 runs
20:00 (D/N) Round 14 Scorecard	(H) Royal Challengers Bangalore; 170/4 (20 overs)	v	Deccan Chargers; 158/6 (20 overs)	SuperSport Park, Centurion; Umpires: Ian Howell and S. Ravi; Player of the match: Manish Pandey (Royal Challengers Bangalore)
20:00 (D/N) Round 14 Scorecard	Manish Pandey 114* (73); Pragyan Ojha 2/32 (4 overs)		Herschelle Gibbs 60 (43); Balachandra Akhil 2/18 (4 overs)	SuperSport Park, Centurion; Umpires: Ian Howell and S. Ravi; Player of the match: Manish Pandey (Royal Challengers Bangalore)
Royal Challengers Bangalore won the toss and elected to bat.; Manish Pandey became the first Indian player to score a century in the IPL.				SuperSport Park, Centurion; Umpires: Ian Howell and S. Ravi; Player of the match: Manish Pandey (Royal Challengers Bangalore)

===== Knockout stage =====
====== Semi-final ======
22 May	Delhi Daredevils; 153/8 (20 overs)	v	Deccan Chargers; 154/4 (17.4 overs)	Deccan Chargers won by 6 wickets
20:00 (D/N) Semi-final 1 Scorecard	Delhi Daredevils; 153/8 (20 overs)	v	Deccan Chargers; 154/4 (17.4 overs)	SuperSport Park, Centurion; Umpires: Billy Doctrove and Daryl Harper; Player of the match: Adam Gilchrist (Deccan Chargers)
20:00 (D/N) Semi-final 1 Scorecard	Tillakaratne Dilshan 65 (51); Ryan Harris 3/27 (4 overs)		Adam Gilchrist 85 (35); Amit Mishra 3/19 (4 overs)	SuperSport Park, Centurion; Umpires: Billy Doctrove and Daryl Harper; Player of the match: Adam Gilchrist (Deccan Chargers)
Deccan Chargers won the toss and elected to field.; Adam Gilchrist scored the fastest half-century of the IPL.				SuperSport Park, Centurion; Umpires: Billy Doctrove and Daryl Harper; Player of the match: Adam Gilchrist (Deccan Chargers)

====== Final ======
24 May	Deccan Chargers; 143/6 (20 overs)	v	Royal Challengers Bangalore; 137/9 (20 overs)	Deccan Chargers won by 6 runs
20:00 (D/N) Final Scorecard	Deccan Chargers; 143/6 (20 overs)	v	Royal Challengers Bangalore; 137/9 (20 overs)	New Wanderers Stadium, Johannesburg; Umpires: Rudi Koertzen and Simon Taufel; Player of the match: Anil Kumble (Royal Challengers Bangalore)
20:00 (D/N) Final Scorecard	Herschelle Gibbs 53* (48); Anil Kumble 4/16 (4 overs)		Roelof van der Merwe 32 (21); Pragyan Ojha 3/28 (4 overs)	New Wanderers Stadium, Johannesburg; Umpires: Rudi Koertzen and Simon Taufel; Player of the match: Anil Kumble (Royal Challengers Bangalore)
Royal Challengers Bangalore won the toss and elected to field.				New Wanderers Stadium, Johannesburg; Umpires: Rudi Koertzen and Simon Taufel; Player of the match: Anil Kumble (Royal Challengers Bangalore)

=== Champions League Twenty20 ===
==== Summary ====
===== Group stage =====
====== Standings – Group A ======
Team	Pld	W	L	T	NR	Pts	NRR
Trinidad and Tobago	2	2	0	0	0	4	+1.175
(England) Somerset Sabres	2	1	1	0	0	2	−1.000
(India) Deccan Chargers	2	0	2	0	0	0	−0.175

- The two top ranked teams qualify for the League stage

==== Fixtures ====
All times are in Indian Standard Time (UTC+05:30).

===== Group stage =====
10 October	Deccan Chargers (India); 153/9 (20 overs)	v	(England) Somerset Sabres; 157/9 (20 overs)	Somerset Sabres won by 1 wicket
20:00 (D/N) Round 1 Scorecard	Deccan Chargers (India); 153/9 (20 overs)	v	(England) Somerset Sabres; 157/9 (20 overs)	Rajiv Gandhi International Cricket Stadium, Hyderabad; Umpires: Daryl Harper and Rudi Koertzen; Player of the match: AC Thomas (Somerset Sabres)
20:00 (D/N) Round 1 Scorecard	VVS Laxman 46 (35); BJ Phillips 3/31 (4 overs)		AC Thomas 30* (17); RP Singh 3/23 (4 overs)	Rajiv Gandhi International Cricket Stadium, Hyderabad; Umpires: Daryl Harper and Rudi Koertzen; Player of the match: AC Thomas (Somerset Sabres)
Somerset Sabres won the toss and chose to field.				Rajiv Gandhi International Cricket Stadium, Hyderabad; Umpires: Daryl Harper and Rudi Koertzen; Player of the match: AC Thomas (Somerset Sabres)

14 October	Trinidad and Tobago; 149/7 (20 overs)	v	(India) Deccan Chargers; 146/9 (20 overs)	Trinidad and Tobago won by 3 runs
20:00 (D/N) Round 2 Scorecard	Trinidad and Tobago; 149/7 (20 overs)	v	(India) Deccan Chargers; 146/9 (20 overs)	Rajiv Gandhi International Cricket Stadium, Hyderabad; Umpires: Daryl Harper and Rudi Koertzen; Player of the match: DJ Bravo (Trinidad and Tobago)
20:00 (D/N) Round 2 Scorecard	WKD Perkins 38 (32); FH Edwards 3/32 (4 overs)		AC Gilchrist 51 (36); DJ Bravo 3/24 (4 overs)	Rajiv Gandhi International Cricket Stadium, Hyderabad; Umpires: Daryl Harper and Rudi Koertzen; Player of the match: DJ Bravo (Trinidad and Tobago)
Deccan Chargers won the toss and chose to field.				Rajiv Gandhi International Cricket Stadium, Hyderabad; Umpires: Daryl Harper and Rudi Koertzen; Player of the match: DJ Bravo (Trinidad and Tobago)

== Statistics ==
Name	Mat	Runs	HS	Ave	SR	Wkts	BBI	Ave	Eco	Ct	St
Herschelle Gibbs	14	371	69*	33.72	112.08	–	–	–	–	11	–
Adam Gilchrist	18	564	85	31.33	152.84	–	–	–	–	12	9
Chaminda Vaas	2	30	20	30.00	142.85	4	2/19	17.75	8.87	0	–
Andrew Symonds	10	259	60*	28.77	144.69	8	2/18	24.25	6.69	2	–
Rohit Sharma	18	411	52	27.40	114.16	11	4/6	15.81	6.96	5	–
Dwayne Smith	8	215	49	26.87	162.87	1	1/25	124.00	8.85	6	–
Suman Tirumalasetti	14	252	41*	22.90	122.33	8	2/14	18.38	7.35	3	–
Ravi Teja Dwaraka	9	65	27	21.66	92.85	–	–	–	–	4	–
Ryan Harris	8	21	9*	21.00	116.66	6	3/27	38.33	7.41	5	–
Azhar Bilakhia	6	67	22	16.75	82.71	–	–	–	–	0	–
Scott Styris	4	41	14	13.67	107.89	7	3/32	14.00	8.16	2	–
Venugopal Rao Yalaka	18	176	32	13.53	121.37	4	2/23	32.75	8.19	8	–
Laxman V. V. S.	7	69	46	9.85	93.24	–	–	–	–	1	–
Fidel Edwards	8	12	8*	6.00	92.30	8	3/32	26.12	7.12	0	–
R. P. Singh	18	15	5	2.50	57.69	26	4/22	17.76	6.82	8	–
Abhinav Kumar	1	1	1	1.00	100.00	–	–	–	–	0	–
Shoaib Ahmed	8	1	1*	0.50	16.66	5	2/20	30.40	8.94	4	–
Pragyan Ojha	17	2	1	0.50	25.00	20	3/21	19.80	6.44	2	–
Harmeet Singh Bansal	8	0	0*	–	–	3	2/23	68.33	8.61	4	–
Jaskaran Singh	2	0	0*	–	–	0	–	–	10.66	0	–

== Awards and achievements ==
=== Awards ===
==== Man of the Match ====
No.	Date	Player	Opponent	Venue	Result	Contribution	Ref
2009 Indian Premier League
1	19 April 2009	R. P. Singh	Kolkata Knight Riders	Cape Town	Won by 8 wickets	4/22 (3.4 overs)	
2	22 April 2009	Adam Gilchrist	Royal Challengers Bangalore	Cape Town	Won by 24 runs	71 (45)	
3	25 April 2009	Pragyan Ojha	Mumbai Indians	Durban	Won by 12 runs	3/21 (4 overs)	
4	27 April 2009	Herschelle Gibbs	Chennai Super Kings	Durban	Won by 6 wickets	69* (56)	
5	6 May 2009	Rohit Sharma	Mumbai Indians	Centurion	Won by 19 runs	38 (36) & 4/6 (2 overs)	
6	11 May 2009	Dwayne Smith	Rajasthan Royals	Kimberley	Won By 53 runs	47 (32)	
7	16 May 2009	Rohit Sharma	Kolkata Knight Riders	Johannesburg	Won By 6 wickets	1/15 (2 overs) & 32* (13)	
8	22 May 2009	Adam Gilchrist	Delhi Daredevils	Centurion	Won by 6 wickets	85 (35)	

==== Season Awards ====
- Champions of the 2009 Indian Premier League
- Winner of the Player of the Series: Adam Gilchrist
- Winner of the Purple Cap: R. P. Singh
- Winner of the Best U–23 Player of the Tournament: Rohit Sharma
- Winner of the Maximum Sixes Award: Adam Gilchrist

=== Achievements ===
- Longest all-time winning streak for the Deccan Chargers: 4
- Rohit Sharma took the first-ever hat-trick for the Deccan Chargers in the group-stage match against the Mumbai Indians in the 2009 IPL
- Adam Gilchrist scored the fastest half century of the IPL in the semi-final match against the Delhi Daredevils.
- Most dot balls bowled in the 2009 IPL: R. P. Singh (169)
- Most wicket-keeping dismissals in the 2009 IPL: Adam Gilchrist
- Qualified for the 2009 Champions League Twenty20

== Reaction ==
Gilchrist praised Rohit Sharma on taking the vice-captaincy role seriously at the end of the second group match of the IPL. He said, “He is a class act. Rohit has taken his vice-captain’s role very seriously and wants to be a leader someday and that is exciting.”

The Deccan Chargers captain, Adam Gilchrist praised his Australian teammate, Andrew Symonds on his performances during their title win. He said, “He's a great personality and a wonderful talent on the cricket field who can turn matches.” He also praised the former captain, V. V. S. Laxman for being the team-man despite being dropped. He said, “He continued to contribute around the group with his experience and his vast knowledge. He wants to learn to be a better Twenty20 player. That's a wonderful example to young players to see a player at his age wanting to evolve into a better player.” On the coach Darren Lehmann, Gilchrist said, “The main one was the coach who has a wonderful cricket brain.”

The maiden IPL title win by the Deccan Chargers helped to increase their brand value by 18% to US$73 million in 2009.
