= 2009 Kolkata Knight Riders season =

Indian Premier League cricket team season

Kolkata Knight Riders
2009 season
- Coach: John Buchanan
- Captain: Brendon McCullum
- Ground(s): Eden Gardens, Kolkata
- IPL: 8th
- Most runs: Brad Hodge (365)
- Most wickets: Ishant Sharma (11)

Kolkata Knight Riders (KKR) is a franchise cricket team based in Kolkata, India, which plays in the Indian Premier League (IPL). They were one of the eight teams that competed in the 2009 IPL. They were captained by Brendon McCullum. Kolkata Knight Riders finished last in the IPL and did not qualify for the Champions League T20.

== Background ==
Kolkata Knight Riders finished at the bottom of the ranking table with three wins and ten losses including a string of nine successive defeats. KKR was among the least active franchises during the off season, with no player trades. However, the team signed Mohnish Parmar during the period and also re-signed Ajantha Mendis to a long-term deal.

On 18 April 2009 a blog by an anonymous author claiming to be a member of the team surfaced on the web. The blog was controversial from the start, giving unflattering nicknames to players, coaches, and owners of KKR and other teams, telling sordid stories, and showing most of them in a very negative light. The blog rapidly became popular and created a lot of media frenzy. The blog worsened an already bad season for KKR, which lost most of their games, had controversies surrounding their coach, John Buchanan, and frequently changed captains, including Sourav Ganguly and Brendon McCullum based on a series of theories discussing "multiple-captains". In August 2010, Bangalore based marketing specialist Anupam Mukerji revealed himself to be the person behind the blog. He said he had "never met a cricketer in his life", and was just making up stories. He never expected it to become this big, he remarked, adding that the Fake Player ended up getting legitimized by the media frenzy. He was inspired by the popularity of a similar blog by Fake Steve Jobs, and the Richard Gere movie The Hoax.

KKR also set up a Talent Resource Development Wing (TRDW) in 2009 to spot local talent nationwide. This was based on BCCI's 2002–06 model which had discovered talents like MS Dhoni and Suresh Raina. The wing was headed by Makarand Wainganker, who had first initiated the TRDW concept for the KSCA. However, Wainganker eventually resigned after persistent disagreements with John Buchanan over team selection and Buchanan's "multiple captains" theory.

Despite the poor on field performance of the team and its struggle at the bottom of the points table, the Kolkata Knight Riders were ranked as the richest team in the tournament with a brand value of $42.1 million.

== Indian Premier League ==
=== Season standings ===
Kolkata Knight Riders finished last in the league stage of IPL 2009.

| Pos | Team | Pld | W | L | NR | Pts | NRR |
|---|---|---|---|---|---|---|---|
| 1 | Delhi Daredevils | 14 | 10 | 4 | 0 | 20 | 0.311 |
| 2 | Chennai Super Kings | 14 | 8 | 5 | 1 | 17 | 0.951 |
| 3 | Royal Challengers Bangalore (R) | 14 | 8 | 6 | 0 | 16 | −0.191 |
| 4 | Deccan Chargers (C) | 14 | 7 | 7 | 0 | 14 | 0.203 |
| 5 | Kings XI Punjab | 14 | 7 | 7 | 0 | 14 | −0.483 |
| 6 | Rajasthan Royals | 14 | 6 | 7 | 1 | 13 | −0.352 |
| 7 | Mumbai Indians | 14 | 5 | 8 | 1 | 11 | 0.297 |
| 8 | Kolkata Knight Riders | 14 | 3 | 10 | 1 | 7 | −0.789 |

Source: Full table on ESPNcricinfo

(C) = Eventual champion; (R) = Runner-up.
Winner, runner-up and best-performing semi-finalist in the group stage qualify for the 2009 Champions League Twenty20.

=== Match log ===
| Date | Opponent | Venue | Result |
|---|---|---|---|
| 19 April | Deccan Chargers | Cape Town | Lost by 8 wickets |
| 21 April | Kings XI Punjab | Durban | Won by 11 runs (D/L Method), MoM- Chris Gayle 44* (26) |
| 23 April | Rajasthan Royals | Port Elizabeth | Lost by 15 runs in Super Over |
| 27 April | Mumbai Indians | Port Elizabeth | Lost by 92 runs |
| 29 April | Royal Challengers Bangalore | Durban | Lost by 5 wickets |
| 1 May | Mumbai Indians | Durban | Lost by 9 runs |
| 3 May | Kings XI Punjab | East London | Lost by 6 wickets |
| 5 May | Delhi Daredevils | Durban | Lost by 9 wickets |
| 10 May | Delhi Daredevils | Johannesburg | Lost by 7 Wickets |
| 12 May | Royal Challengers Bangalore | Pretoria | Lost by 6 wickets |
| 16 May | Deccan Chargers | Port Elizabeth | Lost by 6 wickets |
| 18 May | .Chennai Super Kings | Pretoria | Won by 7 wickets, MoM- Brad Hodge 71* (44) |
| 20 May | Rajasthan Royals | Durban | Won by 4 wickets, MoM- Laxmi Shukla 48* (46) |
Overall record: 3–10. Failed to advance.
