= Michael Buchanan =

Michael or Mike Buchanan may refer to:

- Mike Buchanan (ice hockey) (1932–2017), Canadian ice hockey player
- Mike Buchanan (politician) (born 1957), British men's rights activist, leader of the Justice for Men and Boys party
- Michael Buchanan (cricketer) (born 1983), Australian cricketer
- Michael Buchanan (American football) (born 1991), American football defensive end and linebacker
- House Shoes (Michael Buchanan; fl. from 1994), American hip hop producer and DJ
