= 2009 Indian Premier League final =

- Event: 2009 Indian Premier League
| Deccan Chargers | Royal Challengers Bangalore |
| 143/6 | 137/9 |
| 20 overs | 20 overs |
- Deccan Chargers won by 6 runs
- Date: 24 May 2009
- Venue: New Wanderers Stadium, Johannesburg
- Player of the match: Anil Kumble (RCB)
- Umpires: Rudi Koertzen (SA); Simon Taufel (Aus)
- Attendance: 30,123

The 2009 Indian Premier League final was a day/night Twenty20 cricket match played between the Deccan Chargers and the Royal Challengers Bangalore on 24 May 2009 at the New Wanderers Stadium, Johannesburg to determine the winner of the 2009 Indian Premier League, a professional Twenty20 cricket league in India. It ended as the Chargers defeated the Royal Challengers by six runs.

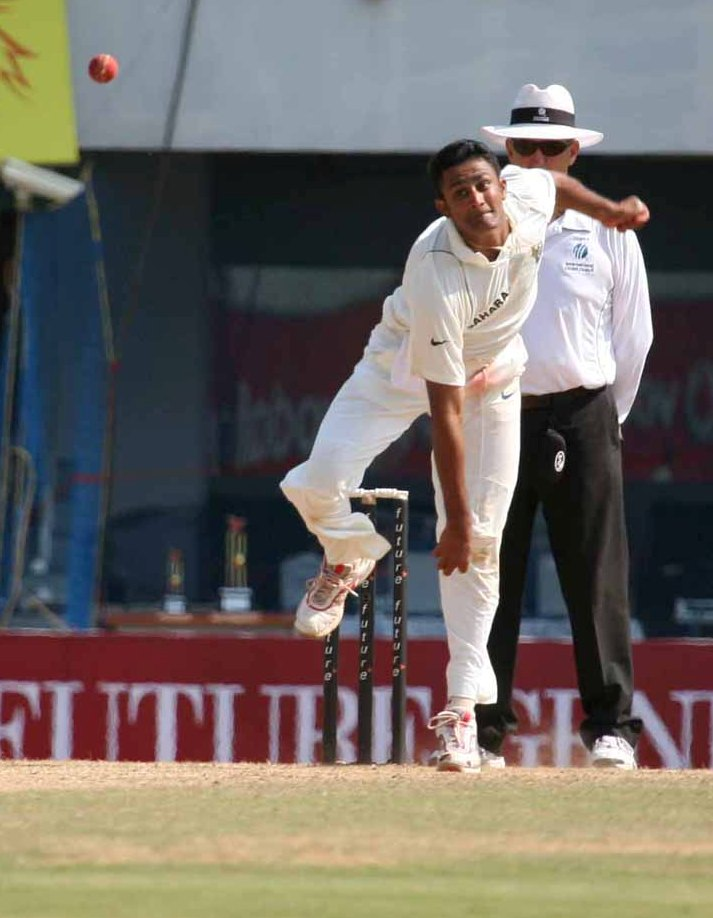
Anil Kumble, the Royal Challengers captain.

The Chargers, captained by Adam Gilchrist, came fourth in group stage table, whereas the Royal Challengers, led by Anil Kumble, stood at the third position. They had defeated the Delhi Daredevils and the Chennai Super Kings respectively in the semi-finals.

Winning the toss, Royal Challengers captain Anil Kumble opted to field first. The Chargers scored 143 runs in 20 overs with a loss of 6 wickets. Batting at opening, Herschelle Gibbs top scored for the Chargers with 53 runs. Royals' bowler Anil Kumble took four wickets for 16 runs. The Royal Challengers failed to build a good opening partnership. However, due to contributions from the middle order, it reached 129/9 in the last over But Royal Challengers failed to take 15 runs from the last over bowled by RP Singh. They took 8 and the match ended with Royal Challengers 137/9. Chargers won the match by 6 runs and earned 2009 Indian Premier League title. Kumble, who was the best performer for the Royal Challengers Bangalore was named the man of the match.

== Route to the final ==
=== Group stage ===
The Chargers started its campaign with four consecutive wins, but lost its next three matches to the Daredevils, the Royals and the Kings. It qualified for the semifinals after losing its last two league matches. The Royal Challengers won its first match in the group stage to the Royals. But, it lost all of its next four matches. Then, it won three consecutive league matches against Knight Riders, Kings XI and Indians. But again lost two. Then it won the last 4 matches of the league.

The two teams faced each other in two matches of the group stage, The two matches were won by the two teams for 1 times.,

Group stage procession
| Team | Group matches | | | | | | | | | | | | | |
| Team | 1 | 2 | 3 | 4 | 5 | 6 | 7 | 8 | 9 | 10 | 11 | 12 | 13 | 14 |
|---|---|---|---|---|---|---|---|---|---|---|---|---|---|---|
| Deccan Chargers | 2 | 4 | 6 | 8 | 8 | 8 | 8 | 10 | 10 | 12 | 12 | 14 | 14 | 14 |
| Royal Challenger Bangalore | 2 | 2 | 2 | 2 | 2 | 4 | 6 | 8 | 8 | 8 | 10 | 12 | 14 | 16 |
| Note: The points at the end of each group match are listed. | | | | | | | | | | Won | | Lost | | |
Note: Click on the points to see the summary for the match.

=== Semifinals ===
The Chargers played the Delhi Daredevils in the first semi-final. The Chargers won the toss and decided to field first. The Daredevils failed to make an opening partnership. Gautam Gambhir was out on the 5th ball of the match with a zero run in scorecard for him and the team. And the Daredevils got a big shock when David Warner followed Gambhir in the very next ball. Daredevils were 0/2 after Over 1. But Virender Sehwag and Tillakaratne Dilshan added 85 runs in the 3rd wicket partnership. At the 85 run Sehwag was out scoring 39 from 31. After that the middle and lower middle batting order took the run to 150's. Daredevils scored 153 for 8 after 20 overs. Tillakaratne Dilshan scored the highest run for his team. He scored 65 from 51. Chargers pacer Ryan Harris was the most successful bowler with a 3/27 figure in 4 overs. After coming to bat Chargers lost their first wicket in 22 runs. However, Gilchrist's 85 from 35 made the target easier and the Deccan Chargers reached the target in 17.4 overs with 6 wickets in hand. Adam Gilchrist was the man of the match.

In the second semi-final, Super Kings played the Royal Challengers . The Royal Challengers won the toss and elected to field first. After making 26 runs at the 61 runs opening partnership Mathew Hayden was out. Then MS Dhoni came to bat. But his slow 28 from 30 made the innings slow. The middle order player Suresh Raina and Albie Morkel tried to score quickly. But they could make 146 for 5 in 20 overs. Parthiv Patel was the highest scorer for Super Kings with 36 from 27. Vinay Kumar was the most successful bowler with 4 from 38 runs in 4 overs. Royal Challengers lost early wickets. They lost Jacques Kallis at the 17 runs. At 22 runs they lost Roelof van der Merwe. But 70 runs at 3rd wicket made the way easier for Royal Challengers. With 92 runs on the board, Manish Pandey departed. After 18 runs at the 4th wicket, with 110 runs on the board Rahul Dravid also departed. Then Virat Kohli and Ross Taylor didn't do any mistake to get the winning runs. Royal Challengers chased 146 with 7 balls and 6 wickets in hand. Manish Pandey was the highest scorer for RCB, scoring 48 from 35 for Royal Challengers while Muttiah Muralitharan took 1 for 15 in 4 overs. Manish Pandey was named the man of the match.

== Match ==
=== Scorecard ===
- On-field umpires: Rudi Koertzen (SA) and Simon Taufel (Aus)
- Third umpire: Daryl Harper (Aus)
- Reserve umpire: Zed Ndamane (SA)
- Match referee: Javagal Srinath (Ind)
- Toss: Royal Challengers Bangalore elected to field
- Result: Deccan Chargers won by 6 runs
- League impact: Deccan Chargers won the 2009 Indian Premier League

Deccan Chargers innings
| Batsmen | Method of Dismissal | Runs | Balls | Strike rate |
|---|---|---|---|---|
| Adam Gilchrist* † | b Kumble | 0 | 3 | 0.00 |
| Herschelle Gibbs | not out | 53 | 48 | 110.41 |
| Tirumalasetti Suman | c Pandey b Vinay Kumar | 10 | 11 | 90.90 |
| Andrew Symonds | b Kumble | 33 | 21 | 157.14 |
| Rohit Sharma | c Pandey b Kumble | 24 | 23 | 104.34 |
| Venugopal Rao | c Taylor b Kumble | 0 | 2 | 0.00 |
| Azhar Bilakhia | lbw b Vinay Kumar | 6 | 7 | 85.71 |
| Ryan Harris | not out | 9 | 5 | 180.00 |
| Pragyan Ojha | did not bat | | | |
| Harmeet Singh | did not bat | | | |
| R. P. Singh | did not bat | | | |
| Extras | (2 lb, 6 w) | 8 | | |
| Total | (20 overs, 7.15 runs per over) | 143/6 | | |

Fall of wickets: 1-0 (Gilchrist, 0.3 overs), 2-18 (Suman, 3.3 overs), 3-58 (Symonds, 8.5 overs), 4-110 (R Sharma, 16.2 overs), 5-115 (V Rao, 16.6 overs), 6-134 (Bilakhia, 19.1 overs)

Royal Challengers Bangalore bowling
| Bowler | Overs | Maidens | Runs | Wickets | Economy |
|---|---|---|---|---|---|
| Anil Kumble* | 4 | 0 | 16 | 4 | 4.00 |
| Praveen Kumar | 4 | 0 | 43 | 0 | 10.75 |
| Jacques Kallis | 4 | 0 | 24 | 0 | 6.00 |
| Vinay Kumar | 4 | 0 | 30 | 2 | 7.50 |
| Roelof van der Merwe | 4 | 0 | 28 | 0 | 7.00 |

Royal Challengers Bangalore innings
| Batsmen | Method of Dismissal | Runs | Balls | Strike rate |
|---|---|---|---|---|
| Jacques Kallis | b Singh | 15 | 17 | 88.23 |
| Manish Pandey | c Gilchrist† b Ojha | 4 | 8 | 50.00 |
| Roelof van der Merwe | st Gilchrist† b Ojha | 32 | 21 | 152.38 |
| Rahul Dravid | b Harmeet Singh | 9 | 13 | 69.23 |
| Ross Taylor | c V Rao b Symonds | 27 | 20 | 135.00 |
| Virat Kohli | st Gilchrist† b Symonds | 7 | 8 | 87.50 |
| Mark Boucher† | c Gibbs b Harmeet Singh | 5 | 6 | 83.33 |
| Robin Uthappa | not out | 17 | 15 | 113.33 |
| Praveen Kumar | c Singh b Ojha | 2 | 3 | 66.66 |
| Vinay Kumar | c Harmeet Singh b Harris | 8 | 8 | 100.00 |
| Anil Kumble* | not out | 1 | 1 | 100.00 |
| Extras | (9 lb, 1 w) | 10 | | |
| Total | (20 overs, 6.85 runs per over) | 137/9 | | |

Fall of wickets: 1-20 (Kallis, 3.3 overs), 2-36 (Pandey, 6.1 overs), 3-57 (van der Merwe, 8.3 overs), 4-79 (Dravid, 11.4 overs), 5-99 (Taylor, 14.2 overs), 6-99 (Kohli, 14.3 overs), 7-107 (Boucher, 15.5 overs), 8-110 (Praveen Kumar, 16.4 overs), 9-129 (Vinay Kumar, 18.6 overs)

Deccan Chargers bowling
| Bowler | Overs | Maidens | Runs | Wickets | Economy |
|---|---|---|---|---|---|
| Ryan Harris | 4 | 1 | 34 | 1 | 8.50 |
| RP Singh | 4 | 0 | 16 | 1 | 4.00 |
| Andrew Symonds | 3 | 0 | 18 | 2 | 6.00 |
| Pragyan Ojha | 4 | 0 | 28 | 3 | 7.00 |
| Harmeet Singh | 4 | 0 | 23 | 2 | 5.75 |
| Rohit Sharma | 1 | 0 | 9 | 0 | 9.00 |
