= Fake IPL Player =

Cricket blog by Anupam Mukerjee

- Website type: Blog
- Available in: English
- Creator: Anupam Mukerjee
- Website: www.fakeiplplayer.com
- Current status: Offline

Fake IPL Player was a cricket blog started by Anupam Mukerjee on 18 April 2009. The blog's appearance coincided with the start of the 2009 edition of the Indian Premier League (IPL) cricket tournament.

== History ==
Originally, the blogger wrote anonymously, widely believed to be a member of the IPL team, Kolkata Knight Riders (KKR). The blog was controversial from the start, giving unflattering nicknames to players, coaches, and owners of KKR and other teams, telling sordid stories, and showing most of them in a very negative light. As the blog rapidly became popular, it was believed to be of a fringe KKR player who was upset at not being part of the core team. The blog worsened an already bad season for KKR, which lost most of their games, had controversies surrounding their coach, John Buchanan, and frequently changed captains, including Sourav Ganguly. The 2009 IPL season took place in South Africa, and two KKR players, Aakash Chopra and Sanjay Bangar, were sent home to India midway through the tournament. This fuelled speculation that they were suspected of being the person behind the blog. The team was also rumoured to have banned use of laptops by players. The management of the team termed the blog as "poison pen writing of the dirtiest variety", while denying it could have been written by an actual player. The blogger posted a disclaimer saying "All characters appearing in this work (blog) are fictitious. Any resemblance to real persons, living or dead, is purely coincidental and unintentional."

== Unmasking ==
In August 2010, Bangalore based marketing specialist Anupam Mukerji revealed himself on television and newspapers as the person writing the blog. He said he had "never met a cricketer in his life", and was just making up stories. He never expected it to become this big, he remarked, adding that the Fake Player ended up getting legitimised by the media frenzy. He said he was inspired by the popularity of a similar blog by Fake Steve Jobs, and the Richard Gere movie The Hoax. He continues to write a weekly column as the Fake IPL Player for Mirror, a Times of India tabloid in Mumbai and Bangalore.

In 2011, Anupam started Pitch Invasion, an online radio station that claims to provide live cricket commentary with a twist.

== Popularity ==
During the IPL season, the blog was very popular in India and Sri Lanka and among major cricketing nations, most of whose players and coaches were involved in the league. According to Mumbai-based digital marketing firm, Pinstorm, the Fake IPL Player blog had at its peak, on 26 April, 150,000 visitors, who each spent 15 minutes on the site, adding up to about 37,000 hours spent on the blog in one day, putting it up there with popular individual-led blogs such as Aamir Khan's blog at its peak with about 170,000 visitors.

The blogger said in an email interview to a newspaper that the key reason behind such wild popularity was the blog's "audacity", and that "the mainstream media needs to realise that getting ex-cricketers to write about a match that happened the previous day, which has already been dissected to death on TV and the internet, isn’t of interest to sports readers anymore."

== Related works ==
=== The Gamechangers ===
In March 2010 Fake IPL Player released a book called 'The Gamechangers' in India, coinciding with the third season of IPL, and loosely based on the contents of his blogs. This was before he had revealed his identity in August 2010. The book, which has been positioned as fiction written anonymously, covers 35 days of the Indian Bollywood League (IBL). The book describes the powerplays and machinations that go on behind the scenes of "megabucks" cricket. The central plot of the book is the chase to unmask a treacherous anonymous blogger who is upsetting the IPL. And through this story, FIP supposedly exposes cricket's dark underbelly. Critical reviews of the book were polarised with some praising it and some others criticising the book and its purpose. The 7 June 2010 issue of India Today put The Gamechangers at No. 9 in the list of Top 10 national best-sellers.

=== Pitch Invasion ===
In April 2011, Anupam Mukerji started an online radio station called Pitch Invasion. In April 2013, Anupam launched Scoryboard, a live cricket web app, under the Pitch Invasion banner. In October, they launched Scoryboard's F1 version.
