= 2009 Royal Challengers Bangalore season =

Indian Premier League cricket team season

Royal Challengers Bangalore
2009 season
- Coach: Ray Jennings
- Captain: Anil Kumble
- Ground(s): M. Chinnaswamy Stadium, Bangalore
- IPL: Runners-up
- CLT20: Group stage
- Most runs: Jacques Kallis (361)
- Most wickets: Anil Kumble (21)

Royal Challengers Bangalore is a franchise cricket team based in Bangalore, India, which plays in the Indian Premier League. They were one of the eight teams that competed in the 2009 Indian Premier League. They were captained by Anil Kumble. Royal Challengers Bangalore finished runners-up in the IPL and qualified for the Champions League T20.

== Indian Premier League season ==
=== Standings ===
Royal Challengers Bangalore finished 3rd in the league stage of IPL 2009.

Pos	Team	Pld	W	L	NR	Pts	NRR
1	Delhi Daredevils	14	10	4	0	20	0.311
2	Chennai Super Kings	14	8	5	1	17	0.951
3	Royal Challengers Bangalore (R)	14	8	6	0	16	−0.191
4	Deccan Chargers (C)	14	7	7	0	14	0.203
5	Kings XI Punjab	14	7	7	0	14	−0.483
6	Rajasthan Royals	14	6	7	1	13	−0.352
7	Mumbai Indians	14	5	8	1	11	0.297
8	Kolkata Knight Riders	14	3	10	1	7	−0.789

Source: Full table on ESPNcricinfo

(C) = Eventual champion; (R) = Runner-up.
Winner, runner-up and best-performing semi-finalist in the group stage qualify for the 2009 Champions League Twenty20.

=== Match log ===
No.	Date	Opponent	Venue	Result	Scorecard
1	18 April	Rajasthan Royals	Cape Town	Won by 75 runs, MoM – Rahul Dravid 66 (48)	Scorecard
2	20 April	Chennai Super Kings	Port Elizabeth	Lost by 92 runs	Scorecard
3	22 April	Deccan Chargers	Cape Town	Lost by 24 runs	Scorecard
4	24 April	Kings XI Punjab	Durban	Lost by 7 wickets	Scorecard
5	26 April	Delhi Daredevils	Port Elizabeth	Lost by 6 wickets	Scorecard
6	29 April	Kolkata Knight Riders	Durban	Won by 5 Wickets, MoM – Mark Boucher 25* (13)	Scorecard
7	1 May	Kings XI Punjab	Durban	Won by 8 runs	Scorecard
8	3 May	Mumbai Indians	Johannesburg	Won by 9 wickets, MoM – Jacques Kallis 69* (59) and 0/23 (4 overs)	Scorecard
9	7 May	Rajasthan Royals	Centurion	Lost by 7 wickets	Scorecard
10	10 May	Mumbai Indians	Port Elizabeth	Lost by 16 runs	Scorecard
11	12 May	Kolkata Knight Riders	Pretoria	Won by 6 Wickets, MoM – Ross Taylor 81* (33)	Scorecard
12	14 May	Chennai Super Kings	Durban	Won by 2 Wickets, MoM – Ross Taylor 46 (50)	Scorecard
13	19 May	Delhi Daredevils	Johannesburg	Won by 7 Wickets, MoM – Jacques Kallis 58 (56) and 1/17 (4 overs)	Scorecard
14	21 May	Deccan Chargers	Centurion	Won by 12 runs, MoM – Manish Pandey 114* (73)	Scorecard
Semifinal	23 May	Chennai Super Kings	Johannesburg	Won by 6 wickets, MoM – Manish Pandey 48 (35)	Scorecard
Final	24 May	Deccan Chargers	Johannesburg	Lost by 6 runs, MoM – Anil Kumble 4/16 (4 overs)	Scorecard
Overall record: 9–7. Runners-up. Qualified for 2009 Champions Trophy Twenty20.

== Champions League Twenty20 ==
=== Match log ===
No.	Date	Opponent	Venue	Result	Scorecard
1	8 October 2009	Cape Cobras	Bengaluru	Lost by 5 wickets	Scorecard
2	12 October 2009	Otago Volts	Bengaluru	Won by 80 runs, MoM - Jacques Kallis 73* (59) 3/18 (4 overs)	Scorecard
3	15 October 2009	Victorian Bushrangers	Bengaluru	Lost by 7 wickets	Scorecard
4	17 October 2009	Delhi Daredevils	Bengaluru	Won by 8 wickets, MoM – Ross Taylor 65 (38)	Scorecard
Overall record: 2-2. Failed to advance.
