= 2009 Rajasthan Royals season =

Indian Premier League cricket team season

Rajasthan Royals
2009 season
- Coach: Shane Warne
- Captain: Shane Warne
- Ground(s): Sawai Mansingh Stadium, Jaipur
- IPL: 6th
- Most runs: Ravindra Jadeja (295)
- Most wickets: Munaf Patel (16)

Rajasthan Royals (RR) is a franchise cricket team based in Jaipur, India, which plays in the Indian Premier League (IPL). The Royals were one of the eight teams that competed in the 2009 Indian Premier League, captained by Shane Warne. They finished 6th in the IPL and did not qualify for the champions league T20.

== IPL ==
=== Standings ===
Rajasthan Royals finished 6th in the league stage of IPL 2009.

| Pos | Team | Pld | W | L | NR | Pts | NRR |
|---|---|---|---|---|---|---|---|
| 1 | Delhi Daredevils | 14 | 10 | 4 | 0 | 20 | 0.311 |
| 2 | Chennai Super Kings | 14 | 8 | 5 | 1 | 17 | 0.951 |
| 3 | Royal Challengers Bangalore (R) | 14 | 8 | 6 | 0 | 16 | −0.191 |
| 4 | Deccan Chargers (C) | 14 | 7 | 7 | 0 | 14 | 0.203 |
| 5 | Kings XI Punjab | 14 | 7 | 7 | 0 | 14 | −0.483 |
| 6 | Rajasthan Royals | 14 | 6 | 7 | 1 | 13 | −0.352 |
| 7 | Mumbai Indians | 14 | 5 | 8 | 1 | 11 | 0.297 |
| 8 | Kolkata Knight Riders | 14 | 3 | 10 | 1 | 7 | −0.789 |

Source: Full table on ESPNcricinfo

(C) = Eventual champion; (R) = Runner-up.
Winner, runner-up and best-performing semi-finalist in the group stage qualify for the 2009 Champions League Twenty20.

=== Match log ===
| No. | Date | Opponent | Venue | Result | Man of the match | Scorecard |
|---|---|---|---|---|---|---|
| 1 | 18 April 2009 | Royal Challengers Bangalore | Cape Town | Lost by 75 runs | | Scorecard |
| 2 | 21 April 2009 | Mumbai Indians | Durban | Match abandoned without a ball bowled | | Scorecard |
| 3 | 23 April 2009 | Kolkata Knight Riders | Cape Town | Won (In The Superover) | Yusuf Pathan 42(21), 18*(4) and 0/27(4 overs) | Scorecard |
| 4 | 26 April 2009 | Kings XI Punjab | Cape Town | Lost by 27 runs | | Scorecard |
| 5 | 28 April 2009 | Delhi Daredevils | Pretoria | Won by 5 wickets | Yusuf Pathan 62*(30) | Scorecard |
| 6 | 30 April 2009 | Chennai Super Kings | Pretoria | Lost by 38 runs | | Scorecard |
| 7 | 2 May 2009 | Deccan Chargers | Port Elizabeth | Won by 3 wickets | Yusuf Pathan 24(17) and 1/19(4 overs) | Scorecard |
| 8 | 5 May 2009 | Kings XI Punjab | Durban | Won by 78 Runs | Graeme Smith 77(44) | Scorecard |
| 9 | 7 May 2009 | Royal Challengers Bangalore | Pretoria | Won by 7 wickets | Amit Singh 4/19(4 overs) | Scorecard |
| 10 | 9 May 2009 | Chennai Super Kings | Kimberley | Lost by 7 wickets | | Scorecard |
| 11 | 11 May 2009 | Deccan Chargers | Kimberley | Lost by 53 runs | | Scorecard |
| 12 | 14 May 2009 | Mumbai Indians | Durban | Won by 2 Runs | Shane Warne 3/24(4 overs) | Scorecard |
| 13 | 17 May 2009 | Delhi Daredevils | Bloemfontein | Lost by 14 runs | | Scorecard |
| 14 | 20 May 2009 | Kolkata Knight Riders | Durban | Lost by 4 wickets | | Scorecard |
