= 2009 Kings XI Punjab season =

Indian Premier League cricket team season

Kings XI Punjab
2009 season
- Coach: Tom Moody
- Captain: Kumar Sangakkara
- Ground(s): PCA Stadium, Mohali
- IPL: 5th
- Most runs: Yuvraj Singh (340)
- Most wickets: Irfan Pathan (17)

Kings XI Punjab (KXIP) is a franchise cricket team based in Mohali, India, which plays in the Indian Premier League (IPL). They were one of the eight teams that competed in the 2009 Indian Premier League. They were captained by Kumar Sangakkara. Kings XI Punjab finished 5th in the IPL and did not qualify for the Champions League T20.

== Indian Premier League ==
=== Season standings ===
Kings XI Punjab finished 5th in the league stage of IPL 2009.

Pos	Team	Pld	W	L	NR	Pts	NRR
1	Delhi Daredevils	14	10	4	0	20	0.311
2	Chennai Super Kings	14	8	5	1	17	0.951
3	Royal Challengers Bangalore (R)	14	8	6	0	16	−0.191
4	Deccan Chargers (C)	14	7	7	0	14	0.203
5	Kings XI Punjab	14	7	7	0	14	−0.483
6	Rajasthan Royals	14	6	7	1	13	−0.352
7	Mumbai Indians	14	5	8	1	11	0.297
8	Kolkata Knight Riders	14	3	10	1	7	−0.789

Source: Full table on ESPNcricinfo

(C) = Eventual champion; (R) = Runner-up.
Winner, runner-up and best-performing semi-finalist in the group stage qualify for the 2009 Champions League Twenty20.

=== Match log ===
No.	Date	Opponent	Venue	Result
1	19 April	Delhi Daredevils	Cape Town	Lost by 10 wickets (D/L Method)
2	21 April	Kolkata Knight Riders	Durban	Lost by 11 runs (D/L Method)
3	24 April	Royal Challengers Bangalore	Durban	Won by 7 wickets, MoM - Ravi Bopara 84 (59)
4	26 April	Rajasthan Royals	Cape Town	Won by 27 runs, MoM - Kumar Sangakkara
5	29 April	Mumbai Indians	Durban	Won by 3 runs, MoM - Kumar Sangakkara 45* (44)
6	1 May	Royal Challengers Bangalore	Durban	Lost by 8 runs, MoM - Yuvraj Singh 3/22 (4overs) & 50 (33)
7	3 May	Kolkata Knight Riders	Port Elizabeth	Won by 6 wickets, MoM - Mahela Jayawardene 52* (41)
8	5 May	Rajasthan Royals	Durban	Lost by 78 runs
9	7 May	Chennai Super Kings	Pretoria	Lost by 12 runs
10	9 May	Deccan Chargers	Kimberley	Won by 3 Wickets, MoM - Mahela Jayawardene
11	12 May	Mumbai Indians	Pretoria	Lost by 8 wickets
12	15 May	Delhi Daredevils	Bloemfontein	Won by 6 wickets, MoM - Brett Lee 3/15 (4 overs)
13	17 May	Deccan Chargers	Johannesburg	Won by 1 run, MoM - Yuvraj Singh 20 (18) & 3/13 (4 overs)
14	20 May	Chennai Super Kings	Durban	Lost by 24 runs
Overall record: 7–7. Failed to advance.
