= Tim Nielsen =

Australian cricketer and coach

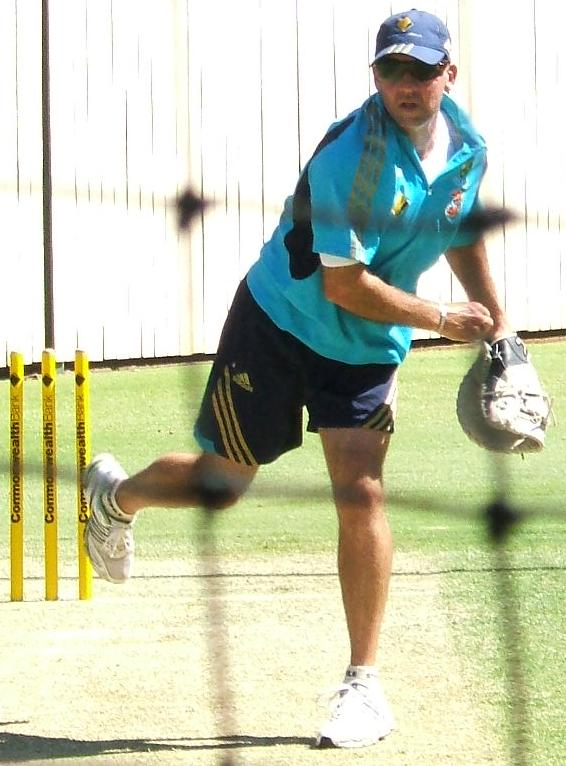

Personal information
- Full name: Timothy John Nielsen
- Born: 5 May 1968 (age 58); Forest Gate, London, England
- Batting: Right-handed
- Bowling: Right-arm off break
- Role: Wicket-keeper
- Relatives: Harry Nielsen (son)

Domestic team information
- Years: Team
- 1990/91–1998/99: South Australia
- FC debut: 2 November 1990 South Australia v Queensland
- Last FC: 11 March 1999 South Australia v Queensland
- LA debut: 8 September 1991 Australia A v Zimbabwe
- Last LA: 20 February 1999 South Australia v Victoria

Career statistics
Competition	First-class	List A
Matches	101	51
Runs scored	3,805	639
Batting average	26.06	18.25
100s/50s	4/15	0/1
Top score	115	57
Balls bowled	72	–
Wickets	1	–
Bowling average	49.00	–
5 wickets in innings	0	–
10 wickets in match	0	–
Best bowling	1/2	–
Catches/stumpings	284/32	65/5
Medal record
Men's Cricket
Representing Australia (as manager)
T20 World Cup
Runner-up	2010 West Indies
Champions Trophy
Winner	2009 South Africa
- Source: CricketArchive, 1 February 2009

Timothy John Nielsen (born 5 May 1968) is a former South Australia state cricketer and formerly the head coach of the Australian cricket team. Nielsen played 101 first-class matches for his state between 1990–91 and 1998–99. He is currently working with Pakistan Men's National cricket team as High Performance Coach.

Nielsen was confirmed as John Buchanan's replacement as the coach of Australia on 5 February 2007. Nielsen, who became the hot favourite when Tom Moody withdrew from contention, took over the role after the 2007 Cricket World Cup.

Like Buchanan, Nielsen played first-class cricket in Australia but never reached international level. He played the last of his 101 games a wicketkeeper-batsman for South Australia in 1999 before he moved into coaching, first with the Redbacks and then as an assistant to Buchanan with the national team.

Nielsen was the head coach at the Commonwealth Bank Centre for Excellence in Brisbane, where he worked with a number of the new crop of players looking to make their way into the Australia team.

His contract was due to run until the end of Australia's 2009 Ashes defence but was extended for a further two years in December 2008 to extend it until after the 2011 World Cup. However, he retired on 20 September 2011, immediately after Australia's tour of Sri Lanka.
