= 2009 Chennai Super Kings season =

Indian Premier League cricket team season

Chennai Super Kings
2009 season
- Coach: Stephen Fleming
- Captain: Mahendra Singh Dhoni
- IPL: Semifinalists
- CLT20: DNQ
- Most runs: Matthew Hayden (572)
- Most wickets: Muttiah Muralitharan (14)
- Most catches: Suresh Raina (7)
- Most wicket-keeping dismissals: MS Dhoni (8)

Chennai Super Kings were one of the eight teams that took part in the 2009 Indian Premier League. They were captained by Indian skipper Mahendra Singh Dhoni for the second season in succession.

== Background ==
Chennai Super Kings had finished as runners-up in the 2008 season of IPL. They had qualified for the 2008 CLT20, but the tournament was cancelled in the aftermath of the 2008 Mumbai attacks.

== Pre-season player signings ==
The Super Kings bought English all-rounder Andrew Flintoff for $1.55 million at the 2009 auction making him the highest-paid IPL cricketer along with English teammate Kevin Pietersen who was bought for the same amount by Royal Challengers Bangalore. Apart from Flintoff, the Chennai Super Kings also bought Murali Vijay, Thilan Thushara and George Bailey. Stephen Fleming, who had decided to retire from all forms of the game after the first season of the IPL, took over as the coach of the Super Kings team from Kepler Wessels. Their batting department was further weakened as Michael Hussey decided to skip the season in order to focus on international cricket ahead of the Ashes.

== Squad ==
Players with international caps before the start of the 2009 IPL season are listed in bold.

No.	Name	Nationality	Birth date	Batting style	Bowling style	Notes
Batsmen
03	**Suresh Raina**	India	27 November 1986 (aged 22)	Left-handed	Right-arm off break	Vice-captain
08	**Murali Vijay**	India	1 April 1984 (aged 25)	Right-handed	Right-arm off break	
10	George Bailey	Australia	7 September 1982 (aged 26)	Right-handed	Right-arm medium	Overseas
12	Vidyut Sivaramakrishnan	India	3 December 1981 (aged 27)	Left-handed	Slow left-arm orthodox	Player withdrew from the tournament.
28	**Matthew Hayden**	Australia	29 October 1971 (aged 37)	Left-handed	Right-arm medium	Overseas
33	**Subramaniam Badrinath**	India	30 August 1980 (aged 28)	Right-handed	Right-arm off break	
42	Arun Karthik	India	15 February 1986 (aged 23)	Right-handed	Right-arm leg break	
All-rounders
11	**Andrew Flintoff**	England	6 December 1977 (aged 31)	Right-handed	Right-arm fast-medium	Overseas. Player withdrew from the tournament.
24	**Jacob Oram**	New Zealand	28 July 1978 (aged 30)	Left-handed	Right-arm medium-fast	Overseas
81	**Albie Morkel**	South Africa	10 June 1981 (aged 27)	Left-handed	Right-arm medium-fast	Overseas
Wicket-keepers
07	**Mahendra Singh Dhoni**	India	7 July 1981 (aged 27)	Right-handed		Captain
09	**Parthiv Patel**	India	9 March 1985 (aged 24)	Left-handed	–	
Bowlers
08	**Muttiah Muralitharan**	Sri Lanka	17 April 1971 (aged 37)	Right-handed	Right-arm off break	Overseas
11	**Lakshmipathy Balaji**	India	27 August 1981 (aged 27)	Right-handed	Right-arm fast-medium	
13	**Joginder Sharma**	India	23 October 1983 (aged 25)	Right-handed	Right-arm fast-medium	
14	Ravichandran Ashwin	India	17 September 1986 (aged 22)	Right-handed	Right-arm off break	
16	**Makhaya Ntini**	South Africa	6 July 1977 (aged 31)	Right-handed	Right-arm fast-medium	Overseas
17	Sudeep Tyagi	India	19 September 1987 (aged 21)	Right-handed	Right-arm medium-fast	
21	Palani Amarnath	India	1 June 1982 (aged 26)	Right-handed	Right-arm medium-fast	
25	Shadab Jakati	India	27 November 1980 (aged 28)	Left-handed	Slow left-arm orthodox	
76	**Manpreet Gony**	India	4 January 1984 (aged 25)	Right-handed	Right-arm medium-fast	
97	**Thilan Thushara**	Sri Lanka	1 March 1981 (aged 28)	Left-handed	Left-arm fast-medium	
	Viraj Kadbe	India	19 November 1989 (aged 19)	Right-handed	Right-arm leg break	

== Indian Premier League ==
The Chennai Super Kings were defeated in their first game of the tournament by the Mumbai Indians by 19 runs. Mumbai skipper Sachin Tendulkar scored an unbeaten half-century and fast bowler Lasith Malinga picked up 3/15 in 4 overs. The Super Kings defeated the Royal Challengers Bangalore in their next game by 92 runs, thanks to Matthew Hayden's 65 (35). CSK, however, lost against the Delhi Daredevils by 9 runs at Durban, where Delhi batsman AB de Villiers scored the first century of the season. Hayden, once again starred with the bat as he scored 57 off 27 balls in the same match. After an abandoned game against Kolkata Knight Riders at Cape Town, CSK lost to the Deccan Chargers by 6 wickets, giving the latter their fourth consecutive win of the season. The Super Kings then returned to form by winning their next five games. Riding on Suresh Raina's 98 (55), Chennai beat Rajasthan Royals by 38 runs at SuperSport Park in Centurion. In the next match against the Delhi Daredevils, left-arm spinner Shadab Jakati impressed with figures of 4/24 as he picked up the crucial wickets of Warner, Dilshan and Dinesh Karthik, giving his team an 18-run victory. At East London, the Super Kings beat Deccan Chargers by 78 runs, with skipper MS Dhoni scoring 58* and spinner Jakati taking 4/22 in 4 overs. They won their next game against Kings XI Punjab by 12 runs in an 18-overs-a-side match. CSK opener Matthew Hayden top-scored with 89 (58), a knock that overpowered half-centuries from KXIP's Yuvraj Singh and Simon Katich. With Subramaniam Badrinath scoring an unbeaten fifty, Chennai cruised to their fifth consecutive win, by beating Rajasthan Royals by 7 wickets. Their winning streak came to an end against the Royal Challengers in a low-scoring game at Durban where RCB won the match by two wickets with two balls to spare after Chennai were bundled out for 129 in the first innings. The Super Kings were able to beat the Mumbai Indians at Port Elizabeth by 7 wickets, thanks once again to Hayden who scored another half-century. Despite scoring 188/3 in 20 overs, the Super Kings went down on the last ball of the match to Kolkata Knight Riders, who were helped by fifties from Brendon McCullum and Brad Hodge. In their last league match, the Chennai Super Kings successfully defended a score of 116/9 against Kings XI Punjab. This still remains the record for the lowest successfully defended total in the history of IPL. This win also ended Punjab's chances of reaching the semi-finals.

The Super Kings finished with 17 points from 14 matches and earned a second place at the league table. At the semi-finals, the Super Kings met the Royal Challengers Bangalore who beat them by 6 wickets. CSK put up 146 on the board despite getting a brisk start from the openers. The Challengers chased down the total with 7 balls to spare after Manish Pandey and Rahul Dravid set the platform for the run-chase with scores of 48 and 44 respectively. Matthew Hayden of CSK, who scored 572 runs in 12 innings with 5 half-centuries at an average of 52 and strike-rate of 145, won the Orange Cap for the leading run-scorer of the season. He was also adjudged Player of the Tournament.

=== Season standings ===
Pos	Team	Pld	W	L	NR	Pts	NRR
1	Delhi Daredevils	14	10	4	0	20	0.311
2	Chennai Super Kings	14	8	5	1	17	0.951
3	Royal Challengers Bangalore (R)	14	8	6	0	16	−0.191
4	Deccan Chargers (C)	14	7	7	0	14	0.203
5	Kings XI Punjab	14	7	7	0	14	−0.483
6	Rajasthan Royals	14	6	7	1	13	−0.352
7	Mumbai Indians	14	5	8	1	11	0.297
8	Kolkata Knight Riders	14	3	10	1	7	−0.789

Source: Full table on ESPNcricinfo

(C) = Eventual champion; (R) = Runner-up.
Winner, runner-up and best-performing semi-finalist in the group stage qualify for the 2009 Champions League Twenty20.

=== Match log ===
No	Date	Opponent	Venue	Result	Scorecard
1	18 April	Mumbai Indians	Cape Town	Lost by 19 runs	Scorecard
2	20 April	Royal Challengers Bangalore	Port Elizabeth	Won by 92 runs, MoM – (Sri Lanka) Muttiah Muralitharan 3/11	Scorecard
3	23 April	Delhi Daredevils	Durban	Lost by 9 runs	Scorecard
4	25 April	Kolkata Knight Riders	Cape Town	Match Abandoned without a ball bowled	Scorecard
5	27 April	Deccan Chargers	Durban	Lost by 6 wickets	Scorecard
6	30 April	Rajasthan Royals	Centurion	Won by 38 runs, MoM – (India) Suresh Raina 98 (55)	Scorecard
7	2 May	Delhi Daredevils	Johannesburg	Won by 18 runs, MoM – (India) Shadab Jakati 4/24	Scorecard
8	4 May	Deccan Chargers	East London	Won by 78 runs, MoM – (India) Mahendra Singh Dhoni 58* (37)	Scorecard
9	7 May	Kings XI Punjab	Centurion	Won by 12 runs (D/L method), MoM – (Australia) Matthew Hayden 89 (58)	Scorecard
10	9 May	Rajasthan Royals	Kimberley	Won by 7 wickets, MoM – (India) S. Badrinath 59* (41)	Scorecard
11	14 May	Royal Challengers Bangalore	Durban	Lost by 2 wickets	Scorecard
12	16 May	Mumbai Indians	Port Elizabeth	Won by 7 wickets, MoM – (Australia) Matthew Hayden 60 (57)	Scorecard
13	18 May	Kolkata Knight Riders	Centurion	Lost by 7 wickets	Scorecard
14	20 May	Kings XI Punjab	Durban	Won by 24 runs, MoM – (Sri Lanka) Muttiah Muralitharan 2/8	Scorecard
15	23 May	Royal Challengers Bangalore (semi-final)	Johannesburg	Lost by 6 wickets	Scorecard
Overall record: 8–6. Failed to make finals, ending fourth.

=== Most runs ===
Player	Innings	Runs	Average	Strike rate	Highest Score	100s	50s
Matthew Hayden	12	572	52.00	144.81	89	0	5
Suresh Raina	14	434	31.00	140.90	98	0	2
MS Dhoni	13	332	41.50	127.20	58*	0	2
Subramaniam Badrinath	11	177	19.66	107.92	59*	0	1
Parthiv Patel	9	142	15.77	112.69	36	0	0

=== Most wickets ===
Player	Innings	Wickets	Average	Economy rate	Best Bowling	4w
Muttiah Muralitharan	13	14	18.64	5.22	3/11	0
Shadab Jakati	8	13	16.69	7.48	4/22	2
Lakshmipathy Balaji	13	13	24.30	8.46	4/21	1
Albie Morkel	12	13	25.23	8.20	2/13	0
Suresh Raina	10	7	23.42	5.92	2/17	0
