= 2009 Mumbai Indians season =

Indian Premier League cricket team season

Mumbai Indians
2009 season
- Coach: Shaun Pollock
- Captain: Sachin Tendulkar
- Ground(s): Wankhede Stadium, Mumbai (33,108)
- IPL: 7th
- Most runs: Jean Paul Duminy (372)
- Most wickets: Lasith Malinga (18)

Mumbai Indians (MI) is a franchise cricket team based in Mumbai, India, which plays in the Indian Premier League (IPL). They were one of the eight teams that competed in the 2009 Indian Premier League. They were captained by Sachin Tendulkar.

== Squad ==
Name	Nationality	Birth date	Batting style	Bowling style	Notes
Batsmen
Sachin Tendulkar	India	24 April 1973 (aged 35)	Right-handed	Right-arm leg break	Captain
Saurabh Tiwary	India	30 December 1989 (aged 19)	Left-handed	Right-arm off break	
Shikhar Dhawan	India	5 December 1985 (aged 23)	Left-handed	Right-arm off break	
Jean-Paul Duminy	South Africa	14 April 1984 (aged 25)	Left-handed	Right arm off break	Overseas
Ajinkya Rahane	India	5 June 1988 (aged 20)	Right-handed	Right-arm medium	
All-rounders
Sanath Jayasuriya	Sri Lanka	30 June 1969 (aged 39)	Left-handed	Slow left arm orthodox	Overseas
Ryan McLaren	South Africa	9 February 1983 (aged 26)	Left-handed	Right-arm medium-fast	Overseas
Graham Napier	England	6 January 1980 (aged 29)	Right-handed	Right-arm medium	Overseas
Abhishek Nayar	India	8 October 1983 (aged 25)	Left-handed	Right-arm medium	
Dwayne Bravo	Trinidad and Tobago	7 October 1983 (aged 25)	Right-handed	Right-arm medium-fast	Overseas
Mohammad Ashraful	Bangladesh	7 July 1984 (aged 24)	Right-handed	Right-arm off break	Overseas
Wicket-keepers
Luke Ronchi	New Zealand	23 April 1981 (aged 27)	Right-handed	–	
Pinal Shah	India	3 November 1987 (aged 21)	Right-handed	–	
Yogesh Takawale	India	5 November 1984 (aged 24)	Right-handed	–	
Bowlers
Harbhajan Singh	India	3 July 1980 (aged 28)	Right-handed	Right-arm off break	Vice Captain
Dilhara Fernando	Sri Lanka	19 July 1979 (aged 29)	Right-handed	Right arm medium-fast	Overseas
Dhawal Kulkarni	India	10 December 1988 (aged 20)	Right-handed	Right-arm medium-fast	
Zaheer Khan	India	7 October 1978 (aged 30)	Right-handed	Left-arm fast-medium	
Lasith Malinga	Sri Lanka	28 August 1983 (aged 25)	Right-handed	Right-arm fast	Overseas
Kyle Mills	New Zealand	15 March 1979 (aged 30)	Right-handed	Right-arm fast	Overseas
Chetanya Nanda	India	29 March 1979 (aged 30)	Right-handed	Right-arm leg break	
Rohan Raje	India	3 September 1986 (aged 22)	Right-handed	Right-arm fast-medium	

== IPL ==
=== Standings ===
Mumbai Indians finished seventh in the league stage of IPL 2009.

Pos	Team	Pld	W	L	NR	Pts	NRR
1	Delhi Daredevils	14	10	4	0	20	0.311
2	Chennai Super Kings	14	8	5	1	17	0.951
3	Royal Challengers Bangalore (R)	14	8	6	0	16	−0.191
4	Deccan Chargers (C)	14	7	7	0	14	0.203
5	Kings XI Punjab	14	7	7	0	14	−0.483
6	Rajasthan Royals	14	6	7	1	13	−0.352
7	Mumbai Indians	14	5	8	1	11	0.297
8	Kolkata Knight Riders	14	3	10	1	7	−0.789

Source: Full table on ESPNcricinfo

(C) = Eventual champion; (R) = Runner-up.
Winner, runner-up and best-performing semi-finalist in the group stage qualify for the 2009 Champions League Twenty20.

=== Match log ===
No.	Date	Opponent	Venue	Result
1	18 April	Chennai Super Kings	Cape Town	Won by 19 runs, MoM – Sachin Tendulkar – 59* (49)
2	21 April	Rajasthan Royals	Durban	Match did not start after intermittent rain
3	25 April	Deccan Chargers	Durban	Lost by 19 runs
4	27 April	Kolkata Knight Riders	Port Elizabeth	Won by 92 runs; MoM – Sachin Tendulkar – 68 (45)
5	29 April	Kings XI Punjab	Durban	Lost by 3 runs
6	1 May	Kolkata Knight Riders	East London	Won by 9 runs; MoM – Jean-Paul Duminy – 52 (37)
7	3 May	Royal Challengers Bangalore	Johannesburg	Lost by 9 wickets
8	6 May	Deccan Chargers	Pretoria	Lost by 19 Runs
9	8 May	Delhi Daredevils	East London	Lost by 7 wickets
10	10 May	Royal Challengers Bangalore	Port Elizabeth	Won by 16 Runs; MoM – Jean-Paul Duminy – 59* (41)
11	12 May	Kings XI Punjab	Pretoria	Won by 8 wickets; MoM – Harbhajan Singh – 1/9 (4 overs)
12	14 May	Rajasthan Royals	Durban	Lost by 2 Runs
13	16 May	Chennai Super Kings	Port Elizabeth	Lost by 7 Wickets
14	21 May	Delhi Daredevils	Pretoria	Lost by 4 Wickets
Overall record: 5–8. Failed to qualify for the semifinals.
