= 2009 Delhi Daredevils season =

Indian Premier League cricket team season

Delhi Daredevils
2009 season
- Coach: Greg Shipperd
- Captain: Virender Sehwag
- Ground(s): Feroz Shah Kotla, Delhi
- IPL: 3rd
- CLT20: Second round
- Most runs: AB de Villiers (465)
- Most wickets: Ashish Nehra (19)

Delhi Daredevils (DD) are a franchise cricket team based in Delhi, India, which plays in the Indian Premier League (IPL). They were one of the eight teams that competed in the 2009 Indian Premier League. They were captained by Virender Sehwag. Delhi Daredevils finished 3rd in the IPL and qualified for the Champions League T20.

== Indian Premier League ==
=== Standings ===
Delhi Daredevils finished first in the league stage of IPL 2009.

| Pos | Team | Pld | W | L | NR | Pts | NRR |
|---|---|---|---|---|---|---|---|
| 1 | Delhi Daredevils | 14 | 10 | 4 | 0 | 20 | 0.311 |
| 2 | Chennai Super Kings | 14 | 8 | 5 | 1 | 17 | 0.951 |
| 3 | Royal Challengers Bangalore (R) | 14 | 8 | 6 | 0 | 16 | −0.191 |
| 4 | Deccan Chargers (C) | 14 | 7 | 7 | 0 | 14 | 0.203 |
| 5 | Kings XI Punjab | 14 | 7 | 7 | 0 | 14 | −0.483 |
| 6 | Rajasthan Royals | 14 | 6 | 7 | 1 | 13 | −0.352 |
| 7 | Mumbai Indians | 14 | 5 | 8 | 1 | 11 | 0.297 |
| 8 | Kolkata Knight Riders | 14 | 3 | 10 | 1 | 7 | −0.789 |

Source: Full table on ESPNcricinfo

(C) = Eventual champion; (R) = Runner-up.
Winner, runner-up and best-performing semi-finalist in the group stage qualify for the 2009 Champions League Twenty20.

=== Match log ===
| No | Date | Opponent | Venue | Result |
|---|---|---|---|---|
| 1 | 19 April | Kings XI Punjab | Cape Town | Won by 10 wickets (D/L Method), MoM- Daniel Vettori – 3/15 (3 overs) |
| 2 | 23 April | Chennai Super Kings | Durban | Won by 9 runs, MoM- AB de Villiers – 105* |
| 3 | 26 April | Royal Challengers Bangalore | Port Elizabeth | Won by 6 wickets, MoM- Tillakaratne Dilshan – 67* |
| 4 | 28 April | Rajasthan Royals | Centurion | Lost by 5 wickets |
| 5 | 30 April | Deccan Chargers | Centurion | Won by 6 wickets, MoM- Dirk Nannes – 2/16 (4 overs) |
| 6 | 2 May | Chennai Super Kings | Johannesburg | Lost by 1 run |
| 7 | 5 May | Kolkata Knight Riders | Durban | Won by 9 wickets, MoM- Gautam Gambhir – 71* (57) |
| 8 | 8 May | Mumbai Indians | East London | Won by 7 wickets |
| 9 | 10 May | Kolkata Knight Riders | Johannesburg | Won by 7 wickets, MoM- Amit Mishra – 3/14 (4 overs) |
| 10 | 13 May | Deccan Chargers | Durban | Won by 12 runs, MoM- Rajat Bhatia – 4/15 (2.4 overs) |
| 11 | 15 May | Kings XI Punjab | Bloemfontein | Lost by 6 wickets |
| 12 | 17 May | Rajasthan Royals | Bloemfontein | Won by 14 runs, MoM- AB de Villiers – 79* (55) |
| 13 | 19 May | Royal Challengers Bangalore | Johannesburg | Lost by 7 wickets |
| 14 | 21 May | Mumbai Indians | Centurion | Won by 4 wickets, MoM- Virender Sehwag – 50(27) |
| 15 | 22 May | Deccan Chargers(semi-final #1) | Centurion | Lost by 6 wickets |

== Statistics ==
Most runs
| Player | Runs |
|---|---|
| AB de Villiers | 465 |
| Tillakaratne Dilshan | 418 |
| Dinesh Karthik | 288 |

Most wickets
| Player | Wickets |
|---|---|
| Ashish Nehra | 19 |
| Dirk Nannes | 15 |
| Pradeep Sangwan | 15 |

== Champions League Twenty20 ==
=== Group standings ===
| Team | Pld | W | L | NR | Pts | NRR |
|---|---|---|---|---|---|---|
| Delhi Daredevils | 2 | 1 | 1 | 0 | 2 | +0.700 |
| Victorian Bushrangers | 2 | 1 | 1 | 0 | 2 | +0.136 |
| Wayamba | 2 | 1 | 1 | 0 | 2 | −0.875 |

=== Second round standings ===
| Team | Pld | W | L | NR | Pts | NRR |
|---|---|---|---|---|---|---|
| Victorian Bushrangers | 3 | 2 | 1 | 0 | 4 | +0.911 |
| Cape Cobras | 3 | 2 | 1 | 0 | 4 | −0.219 |
| Royal Challengers Bangalore | 3 | 1 | 2 | 0 | 2 | −0.114 |
| Delhi Daredevils | 3 | 1 | 2 | 0 | 2 | −0.398 |

=== Match log ===
| Date | Opponent | Venue | Result | Scorecard |
|---|---|---|---|---|
| 9 October | Victorian Bushrangers | Delhi | Lost by 7 wickets | Scorecard |
| 11 October | Wayamba Elevens | Delhi | Won by 50 runs, MoM – Virender Sehwag 66 (42) | Scorecard |
| 17 October | Royal Challengers Bangalore | Bangalore | Lost by 8 wickets | Scorecard |
| 19 October | Cape Cobras | Delhi | Won by 30 runs, MoM – Owais Shah 39* (38) | Scorecard |
Overall record":2–2. Did not advance.
