= Mike Young (cricket) =

American cricket coach

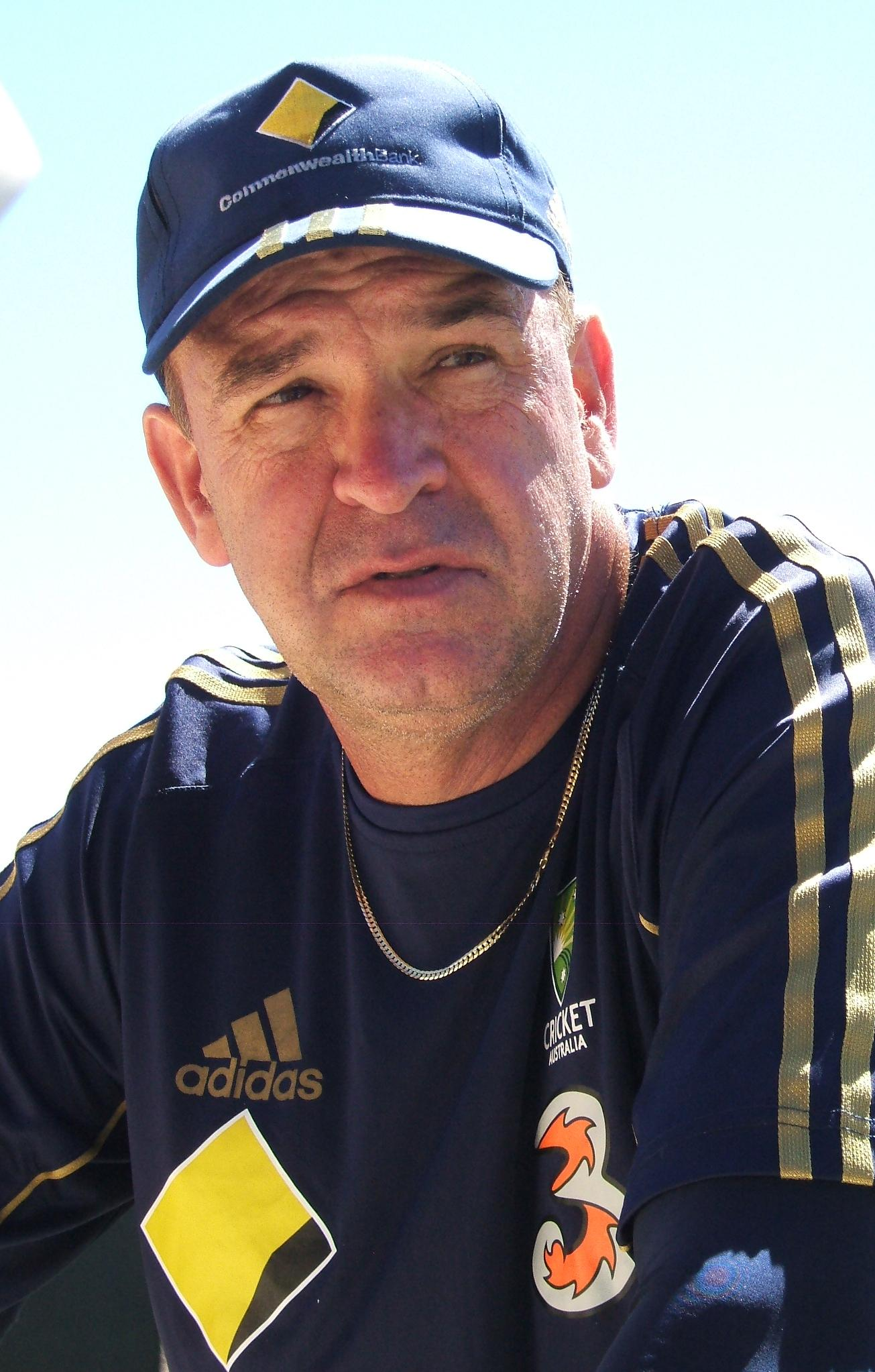
Mike Young

Mike Young (born 21 December 1955) is a former Australian cricket team fielding coach, as well as a former US minor league and Australian baseball manager, player and coach.

== Playing career ==
Young attended the University of Wisconsin-River Falls and he was the team's MVP in 1978. After graduation, he managed to land a contract to play in the Netherlands Honkbal Hoofdklasse baseball league and he played there in 1979 and 1980 and realized that there were other opportunities for American players to ply their skills around the globe. He sent his resume around and was contacted in 1981 by the Queensland Rams, an Australian Baseball League team, which he also player-coached and led to a national championship (the Claxton Shield) in 1982.

== Managerial career ==
=== America ===
Because the Australian and American seasons do not overlap, Young was able to pursue opportunities on both continents, and in 1985 landed the job of coach with the Medicine Hat Blue Jays, his first in organised baseball. In 1989, he managed the Bluefield Orioles in the Appalachian League and the Wausau Timbers in the Midwest League in 1990. He was a coach with the Rochester Red Wings in 1991 and 1992, then returned to managing with two seasons in the Cleveland Indians organisation.

=== Australia ===
At the same time, he was becoming a major player in the development of baseball in Australia, landing a coaching job with the Australian national team. He managed the team at the 1988 Olympics in Seoul, South Korea. He was twice named the International Baseball Federation coach of the year, in 1997 and 1999, for his work with the Australian national team. This included its results in two Intercontinental Cups, a bronze medal in the 1997 tournament and then to a gold medal at home in 1999. Young's work down under coincided with a period when Australian baseball was booming, producing Major League players like Dave Nilsson, Mark Hutton, Cam Cairncross, Shayne Bennett and Chris Snelling, all of whom reached the major leagues. This boom is linked to Young's work, as he is the one who developed the idea of the Australian Baseball Academy, which is jointly funded by Major League Baseball and aims at grooming Australian baseball talent. The number of Australian players signed by MLB has quadrupled since the Academy's foundation.

=== Cricket ===
Young's career took another twist in 2000 when the Australian cricket federation approached him for help. Fielding has long been an under-developed aspect of cricket, as teams have concentrated on developing bowlers and batsmen. The Australians, observing how fielding was a central part of baseball, decided to exploit an opportunity by having Young coach their players on catching, throwing and positioning. Young was appointed as an assistant coach until 2005 when his contract was not renewed and instead moved back to Chicago to manage the Rockford Riverhawks. During the 2005 Ashes series the Australian teams fielding had slipped and the side lost the Ashes to England for the first time since 1987. John Buchanan then made the decision for Australia to have a full-time fielding coach and Young became speculated in the media as the first baseball coach to coach a national cricket team and announced he would like to finish his managerial career doing it. In 2009 he spent three weeks working with the Indian cricket team as a fielding consultant.
