= Odyssey (bookstore) =

Chain of bookstores in India

Odyssey India Ltd.
- Type: Subsidiary
- Industry: Retail
- Founded: 1995
- Founder: T S Ashwin
- Headquarters: Adyar, Chennai, India
- Website: www.odyssey.in

Odyssey is a chain of bookstores in India, headquartered in Adyar, Chennai. Apart from books, the stores also sell music, movies, multimedia, stationery, toys and gifts. As of May 2010, Odyssey operates 56 stores across the country, including in Bangalore, Calicut, Chennai, Coimbatore, Delhi, Ghaziabad, Hyderabad, Jaipur, Mumbai, Noida and Pune

== History ==
Odyssey opened its first bookstore in Adyar, Chennai in 1995. Since then, the company has opened a number of outlets in more than a dozen cities across India, while the Adyar outlet itself has been relocated and expanded twice. The company's product range has also vastly expanded, although it claims that books remain its primary focus.

More recently, Odyssey has entered the areas of eyewear and luxury writing instruments with the launch of The Eyewear Store and Editions.
