= Michael Buchanan (cricketer) =

Australian cricketer (born 1983)

Personal information
- Born: 6 May 1983 (age 43); Brisbane, Queensland, Australia
- Source: Cricinfo, 9 October 2020

Michael Buchanan (born 6 May 1983) is an Australian cricketer. He played in eleven List A and five Twenty20 matches for Queensland in 2006 and 2007.

== See also ==
- List of Queensland first-class cricketers
