= John Buchanan (Australian cricketer) =

Australian cricketer

Personal information
- Full name: John Marshall Buchanan
- Born: 5 April 1953 (age 73); Ipswich, Queensland, Australia
- Nickname: Buck
- Height: 1.95 m (6 ft 5 in)
- Batting: Right-handed
- Bowling: Right arm medium
- Role: Batsman
- Relatives: Michael Buchanan (son); Tim Buchanan (son); Nick Buchanan (son)

Domestic team information
- Years: Team
- 1978/79: Queensland

Head coaching information
- Years: Team
- 1999–2007: Australia
- 2008-2009: Kolkata Knight Riders

Career statistics
Competition	First-class	List A
Matches	7	1
Runs scored	160	64
Batting average	12.30	64.00
100s/50s	0/0	0/1
Top score	41	64
Balls bowled	32	12
Wickets	0	0
Bowling average	–	–
5 wickets in innings	–	–
10 wickets in match	–	–
Best bowling	–	–
Catches/stumpings	5/0	1/0
Medal record
Men's Cricket
Representing Australia as Coach
ICC Cricket World Cup
Winner	2003 South Africa-Zimbabwe-Kenya
Winner	2007 West Indies
ICC Champions Trophy
Winner	2006 India
- Source: CricketArchive, 13 August 2015

John Marshall Buchanan (born 5 April 1953) is the current First XI cricket coach at Brisbane Boys' College, and a former cricket coach of the Australia national cricket team and of Kolkata Knight Riders team in the Indian Premier League. John Buchanan is a King's Old Collegian (University of Queensland, Brisbane) and is also an old boy of The Southport School, located in Gold Coast, Queensland, Australia. Buchanan is also known in cricketing circles as 'Ned Flanders', due to his similarity in appearance to the character in The Simpsons. Buchanan led the Australian teams to being the champions of both the 2003 Cricket World Cup and the 2007 Cricket World Cup, along with winning the 2006 ICC Champions Trophy.

== Early career ==
Buchanan had a brief first-class career with Queensland in 1978–79 in which he played in 7 matches and scored 160 runs. He also played league cricket in England including a spell at Hyde Cricket Club in Cheshire.

Buchanan began his coaching career in England: he was player/coach/professional for Oldham in Central Lancashire league as well as Cambridgeshire in Minor Counties 1978 and 1979. Oldham won the League and Cup double in 1979 which was first time in over 40 years.

Prior to his appointment as Australian head coach, he had five successful years as the coach of Queensland, during which time they won two Sheffield Shield titles, including the first in the state's history in 1994–95, and two Mercantile Mutual Cup titles. He also coached Middlesex in 1998.

== Australian coach ==
Buchanan was appointed as Australian men's national coach in October 1999 to replace Geoff Marsh. He was considered an unlikely candidate given that he had not played at Test level as had his predecessors, Marsh and Bob Simpson. His initial results were very impressive, helping steer the team to unprecedented success, this included, at one point a record of 15 wins from 15 games played. However, his contributions have often been questioned by legends of the game including Ian Chappell, Sunil Gavaskar and even Shane Warne who played under him. The most common criticism has been that he inherited a very strong team and his presence just happened to coincide with their victories. Warne has consistently held that Buchanan tended to reinvent everything and complicate all aspects of the game.

Buchanan, along with former captain Ricky Ponting, led the side to numerous successes, including a world-record 16 consecutive Test match victories and 23 ODI victories in world cup tournaments, Buchanan only not involved in the first one, a 2001 and 2002–03 Ashes domination winning both series 4–1, the 2003 ICC Cricket World Cup in South Africa, the 2004 tour of India, in which Australia hadn't won a series there in thirty-six years, and more recently, following their shock Ashes defeat, a whitewash of the Super Series that saw the Aussies up against a World XI. In late 2006 he helped the team to their first ever ICC Champions Trophy victory, after four previously failed attempts and followed this with a 5–0 whitewash in the 2006–07 Ashes Series, the first since the 1920–21 Series. In 2007 his team won their third consecutive world cup. His unorthodox methods have raised a few eyebrows and Shane Warne was dismissive about his role in the team. However, former captain Ponting has credited him as being one of the important reasons why Australia completed their World Cup hat trick of wins.

== Post-retirement ==
Following his retirement as Australia's cricket coach, Buchanan declined an indirect approach to coach the Indian cricket team on the grounds that he was not yet ready for another international assignment. However, Buchanan did not rule out a return to coaching an international cricket team in the future.

In mid-2006, Buchanan confirmed that at the conclusion of the 2007 World Cup in the West Indies, he would step down, possibly to coach the Southern Redbacks. However, in October 2007, he accepted a position as Ambassador for Cricket Coaches in Australia, where he hopes to use his experience to help the development of Australian coaches in the future.

Buchanan released a book named, "If Better Is Possible". His book shows how business managers at all levels can lead their teams to greatness.

In 2009 Buchanan was inducted into the Queensland Sport Hall of Fame.

He is now the head coach of the cricket program at Brisbane Boys' College.

== Kolkata Knight Riders ==
During the second season of the IPL, Buchanan's strategies for KKR raised a lot of controversies which were further elevated because of the team's poor performance. Sunil Gavaskar, a former Indian player also accused Buchanan and his coaching staff of racial discrimination against players from India. He was sacked in June 2009 by the team owners for his poor performance.

== England consultant ==
In preparation for the 2010–11 Ashes series, the England and Wales Cricket Board hired Buchanan to act as a consultant to the England Cricket Team.

== New Zealand Director of Cricket ==
Buchanan was appointed to the role of Director of Cricket for New Zealand Cricket in May 2011. Buchanan was appointed to oversee the establishment of New Zealand Cricket's new high performance programme. He was heavily criticised as he gave Black Cap player Ross Taylor the captaincy over the more likely candidate Brendon McCullum. However, two years later Taylor was sacked and McCullum appointed as captain. In July 2013 he resigned from his role in New Zealand.

Preceded by Don Bennett	Middlesex County Coach; 1998	Succeeded by Mike Gatting

Preceded by Geoff Marsh	Australian National Cricket Coach; October 1999 – May 2007	Succeeded by Tim Nielsen
