= Azhar Bilakhia =

Indian cricketer (born 1986)

Personal information
- Born: 31 May 1986 (age 40); Mohwa, Bhavnagar, India
- Nickname: AB
- Batting: Right-handed
- Bowling: Right-arm medium
- Role: Batsman

Domestic team information
- Years: Team
- 2005–2010: Baroda
- 2009–2010: Deccan Chargers

Career statistics
Competition	FC	LA	T20
Matches	25	16	19
Runs scored	1,433	495	377
Batting average	32.56	30.93	23.56
100s/50s	2/5	0/5	0/3
Top score	157	96	80*
Balls bowled	111	–	–
Wickets	0	–	–
Bowling average	–	–	–
5 wickets in innings	–	–	–
10 wickets in match	–	–	–
Best bowling	–	–	–
Catches/stumpings	15/–	4/–	4/–
- Source: ESPNcricinfo, 5 July 2019

Azhar Bilakhia (born 31 May 1986) is an Indian first-class cricketer who plays for Baroda.

He is a middle-order batsman. In 2005, he started his career with Gujarat Cricket Association (GCA) and then shifted to BCA in 2007–08. According to the Times of India, (TOI Newspaper), Baroda Cricket Association (BCA) management received a letter from the player stating his decision to quit cricket forever.
