= M. P. Pandove =

Indian cricketer

Personal information
- Full name: Mohinder Pratap Pandove
- Born: 18 November 1945 (age 80); Sunam, Punjab, India
- Batting: Right-handed
- Bowling: unknown
- Role: All-rounder, occasional wicket-keeper
- Relatives: Dhruv Pandove (son)

Domestic team information
- Years: Team
- 1960/61–1967/68: Southern Punjab
- 1968/69–1977/78: Punjab

Career statistics
Competition	FC
Matches	75
Runs scored	3,341
Batting average	28.31
100s/50s	3/17
Top score	109*
Balls bowled	3,838
Wickets	52
Bowling average	39.03
5 wickets in innings	2
10 wickets in match	0
Best bowling	5/41
Catches/stumpings	37/1
- Source: ESPNcricinfo, 2 January 2016

M. P. Pandove (born 18 November 1945) is an Indian former first-class cricketer and cricket administrator. During his playing career, he appeared for Southern Punjab, Punjab and North Zone. He later worked in administrative roles with the Board of Control for Cricket in India (BCCI) and the Punjab Cricket Association (PCA).

== Playing career ==
Pandove was born on 18 November 1945 in Sunam, Punjab. He played as an all-rounder who batted right-handed and was an occasional wicket-keeper. He made his first-class debut for Southern Punjab at the age of 14 in a 1960–61 Ranji Trophy match against Jammu and Kashmir. In a 1961–62 Ranji Trophy game against Northern Punjab at Jalandhar, he scored 100 not out. He was 16 years 48 days old when he made that century. He played for Southern Punjab until the 1967/68 season, and after the team was unified with Northern Punjab, he continued his career with the newly created Punjab team. He played till the 1977/78 season and appeared in one match for North Zone in the 1971–72 Duleep Trophy.

== As Administrator ==
Pandove became a cricket administrator in his later years. He has worked in several positions such as the joint secretary of the BCCI, BCCI treasurer and the honorary secretary of PCA, a position he holds as of December 2015. Pandove was the senior selector for the Indian team when Sachin Tendulkar was made captain. In April 2015, he was appointed chairman of the National Cricket Academy for the second time. In August 2015, he was appointed to chair a five-member ad-hoc committee for cricket administration in the state of Uttarakhand.

== Personal life ==
Pandove's son Dhruv Pandove was also a first-class cricketer who represented Punjab. Dhruv scored his first century at the age of 14 years and 294 days. He died in a road accident in January 1992 at the age of 18.
