= Brabourne Stadium =

International cricket stadium in Mumbai, Maharashtra, India

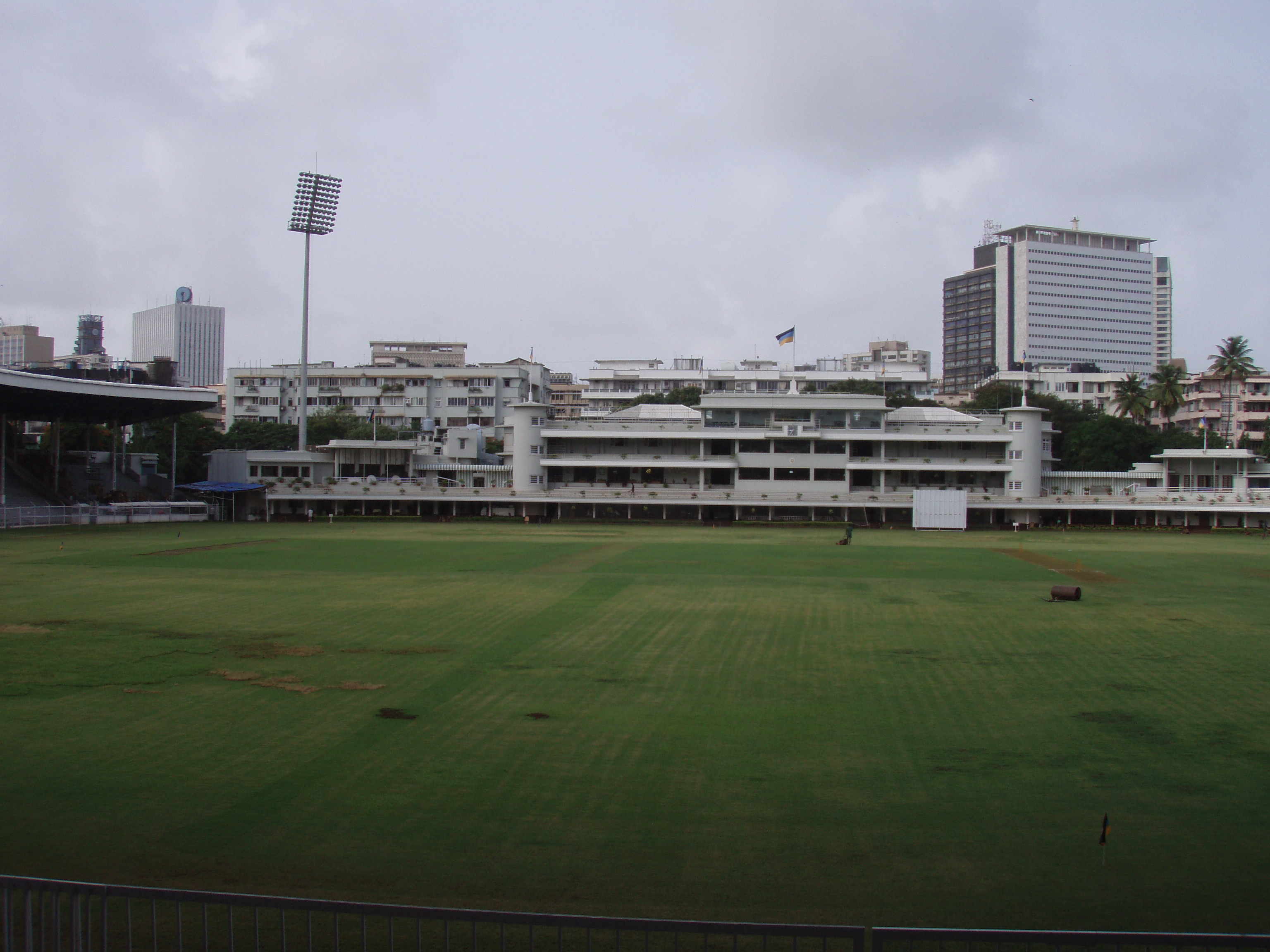
- Interactive map of Brabourne Stadium
- Location: Churchgate, Mumbai, India
- Coordinates: 18°55′56″N 72°49′29″E
- Owner: Cricket Club of India
- Capacity: 50,000
- Public transit: Churchgate; Churchgate

Ground information
- Establishment: 1937; 89 years ago
- Tenants: Cricket Club of India; Mumbai Men's; Mumbai Women's; Mumbai Indians; Mumbai Indians; Rajasthan Royals
- End names
- Pavilion End; Church Gate End

International information
- First men's Test: 9–13 December 1948: India v West Indies
- Last men's Test: 2–6 December 2009: India v Sri Lanka
- First men's ODI: 23 October 1989: Pakistan v Australia
- Last men's ODI: 29 October 2018: India v West Indies
- Only men's T20I: 20 October 2007: India v Australia
- First women's ODI: 4 December 2003: India v New Zealand
- Last women's ODI: 17 February 2013: Australia v West Indies
- First women's T20I: 22 March 2018: India v Australia
- Last women's T20I: 20 December 2022: India v Australia
- As of 20 December 2022; Source: ESPNcricinfo

The Brabourne Stadium is an international cricket stadium in Mumbai in Western India, built in the British Bombay era. It is the home ground of the Mumbai men's and women's cricket teams. It can accommodate 50,000 people for sports matches. The ground is owned by the Cricket Club of India (CCI). The North Stand of the Brabourne had housed the Board of Control for Cricket in India (BCCI) headquarters and the 1983 Cricket World Cup trophy until 2006, when both were moved to the newly built Cricket Centre at the nearby Wankhede Stadium.

The Brabourne Stadium hosted test matches from 1948 to 1972 and it was the venue for Bombay Pentangular matches from 1937 until 1946. After disputes over ticketing arrangements with the CCI, the Bombay Cricket Association (BCA) built the larger Wankhede Stadium north of Brabourne. It was no longer used for tests, although visiting teams played a few first-class matches at the ground. Apart from cricket, the ground has also played host to tennis and association football matches, as well as music shows and concerts.

In the 21st century, international cricket has returned to the Brabourne; it played host to the ICC Champions Trophy in 2006 and was the venue for the first Twenty20 International played in India in 2007. Brabourne hosted a test match in December 2009 after 36 years, thus creating a record for the longest time gap between two tests at the same ground. The ground was home of Mumbai Indians. The opening, Super Six and final matches of the ICC Women's Cricket World Cup 2013 were held here. At its AGM in September 2013, the BCCI unanimously decided to allot international matches as per its rotation policy, reviving the ground as a regular international venue. BCCI used this stadium on 29 May 2014 for the IPL playoff match between Mumbai Indians and Chennai Super Kings. In the 2015 IPL season, the venue was secondary home of Rajasthan Royals.

== Founding ==
The CCI was incorporated as a company on 8 November 1933, during the MCC's 1933–34 tour of India, with its registered office in New Delhi. R. E. Grant Govan, the President of the BCCI, became the first President of the club. Anthony de Mello, the Secretary of the BCCI from its inception in 1928 until 1937, also served as the secretary of CCI from 1933 to 1937. Sir Nowroji Saklatwala was the first Chairman of club, who served till his death in 1938, who also donated a large sum for construction of pavilion of the stadium. Though the CCI was originally based in New Delhi, Bombay (present-day Mumbai) was chosen as the location of its new ground as Bombay was considered the home of cricket in India. Brabourne Stadium was built on 90,000 square yards of reclaimed land along Marine Drive near Churchgate railway station in South Bombay and was India's first permanent sporting venue.

The negotiations for the land for the new cricket ground took place between de Mello and the then Bombay governor Lord Brabourne. De Mello used the name of Antonio Piedade da Cruz, an artist from Goa who was painting Lord Brabourne at the time, to obtain a meeting. The popular story goes that before returning at the end of the meeting, de Mello asked Lord Brabourne : 'Your excellency, which would you prefer to accept from sportsmen, money for your Government, or immortality for yourself?'. Brabourne chose immortality and the CCI was allotted 90,000 square yards at a price of ₹ 13.50 per square yard from land reclaimed in the Backbay reclamation scheme. Messrs. Gregson, Batley and King were appointed the architects of the facility and Shapoorji Pallonji & Co. were awarded the contract for construction. The intention of the ground design was such that it be the Lord's of India.

The foundation stone was laid by Lord Brabourne on 22 May 1936. The ground was intended to provide covered accommodation for 35,000 spectators and contain pavilions, tennis courts, and a swimming pool. Frank Tarrant was the first groundsman. The first match was played on the incomplete ground in October 1937 between the CCI and the Spencer Cup XI. The ground was opened on 7 December 1937 by Roger Lumley, then Governor of Bombay, Lord Brabourne now being the Governor of Bengal. The ground was named after Brabourne at the suggestion of the Maharaja of Patiala. On the same day, the CCI XI met the visiting Lord Tennyson's XI in the inaugural first-class match on the ground.

The estimated cost of construction was ₹ 1.8 million but the actual costs exceeded this by over a third. It took the efforts of Abubhai Jasdenwala, who had succeeded de Mello as the secretary in 1937, and Sir Nowroji Saklatwala, then Chairman of the Tata Group, among others, for the CCI to cover the costs. The Maharaja of Idar paid for the Governor's pavilion, and the Maharaja of Patiala paid for the pavilion that is his namesake. The remaining deficits were paid off from the sale of debentures and from the income from the Bombay Pentangular matches.

== Architecture ==
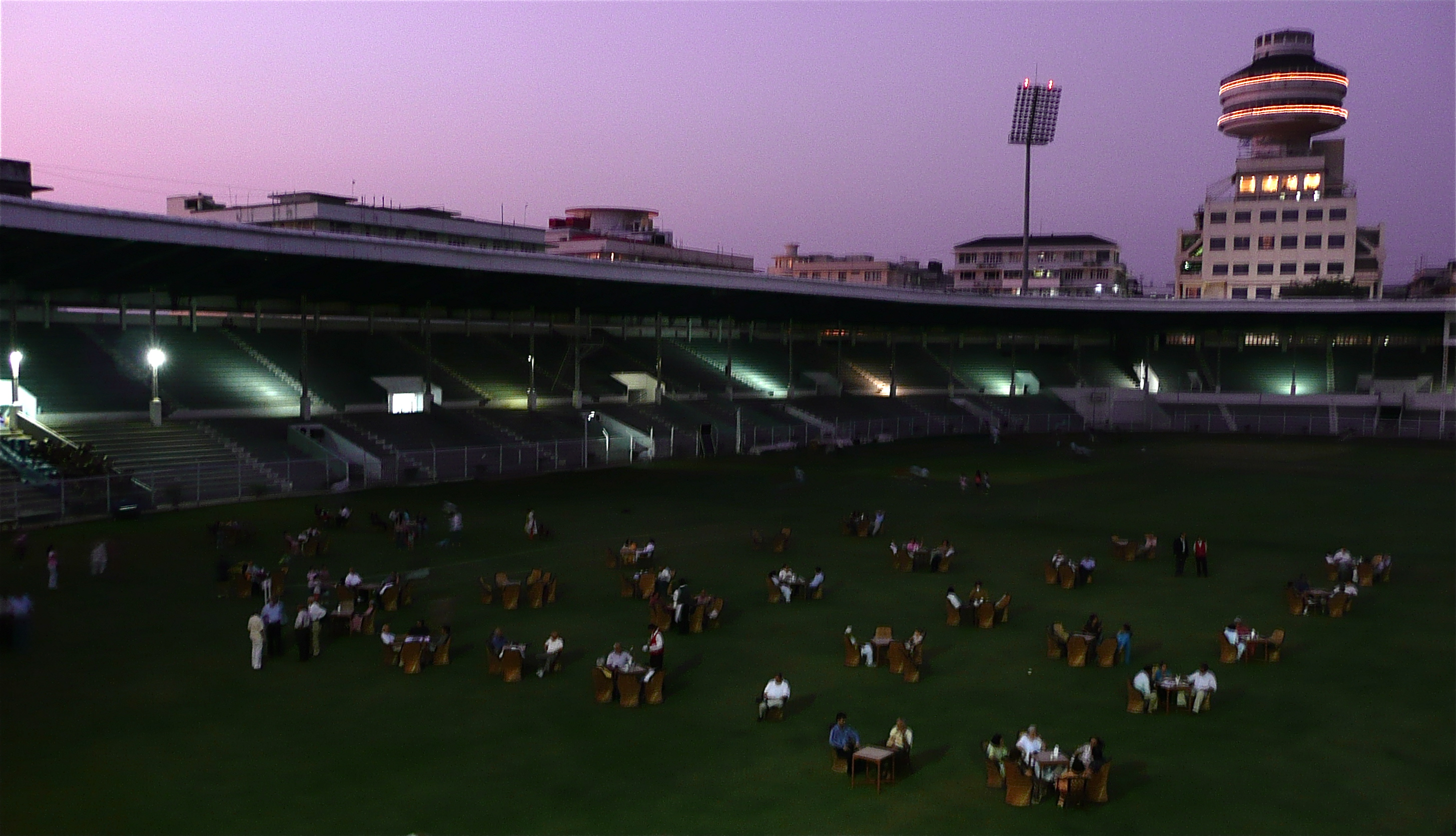
Inside view of the stadium during an evening event

The Brabourne has been identified as a Heritage Grade IIB structure. The stadium has a pavilion and three public stands, namely the West Stand, North Stand and East Stand. The three public stands face the clubhouse from three different sides of the ground and are sheltered by cavernous, overhanging roofs.

The pavilion can be divided into the clubhouse in the centre with the Governor's Pavilion and the Maharaja of Patiala Pavilion on either side and is a three-story art deco nautical structure with rounded pediments, flagpoles and port-hole windows. The pavilion boasts of dark wood wall panelling and decorative marble floors. The walls of the pavilion are adorned with portraits of past and present cricketers and photographs of famous cricket matches.

The Brabourne Stadium has drawn praise from various quarters. Australian cricketer Keith Miller called the ground "the most complete ground in the world", West Indian legend Frank Worrell stated that the Brabourne was the only ground in the world where he could be in his dressing gown until he had to pad up, hence he loved playing at the venue. According to Worrell's compatriot, Brian Lara, "It is one of the most beautiful venues across the world. Perfect to host a good cricket match." Former Indian captain Ajit Wadekar commented on the eve of the India-Sri Lanka test in 2009, "It is the ultimate dream for any cricketer to play at Lord's; by the same token, every Indian cricketer would like to play at the CCI. It has a lovely atmosphere and that makes you feel different. You also play in front of a knowledgeable crowd." Former Indian captain M. S. Dhoni stated, "... Of course, it is special to play at CCI. ... It has a nice atmosphere." Noted Journalist and Chairman of the Mid-Day group, Khalid A. H. Ansari wrote in his newspaper, "Having witnessed cricket the world over, I can confidently say that cricket at the alluring Brabourne Stadium is an experience without parallel."

== Cricket matches ==
=== First match and Pentangular ===
The first first-class match to be played at the ground was between Lord Tennyson's XI and a CCI XI in 1937.

With the completion of the ground in 1937, the Bombay Pentangular tournament was moved to the Brabourne from the Bombay Gymkhana. It was in this year that the Rest entered the competition as the fifth team; Hindus, however, withdrew their team after a dispute over the seating allocation. The stadium was packed to capacity during all pentangular matches. The battle between Vijay Merchant and Vijay Hazare in 1943–44 saw the record for the highest individual score being bettered three times in the first week of December, ending with Hazare's 309 run contribution to Rest's total of 387 all out in the final. In the Ranji match against Maharashtra that began on the last day of the year, Merchant improved upon it with an innings of 359 not out which still stands as the highest score made on the ground. In the 1944–45 final of the Pentangular, Muslims chased 298 to defeat the Hindus by one wicket. The Pentangular tournament was discontinued after the 1946–47 season.

=== Test cricket ===
Brabourne hosted 17 Test matches between 1948 and 1973, starting with two matches against the West Indies in India's first home series after the World War II in 1948–49. The first test to produce a result at the Brabourne was the fourth it hosted, when India beat Pakistan in 1952. India won their first ever test series after taking a 2–1 lead on the basis of this victory. Vijay Hazare scored a hundred in each of his four test match appearances at the ground, the most by any player. Indian batsman Abbas Ali Baig became the first Indian cricketer to be kissed on a cricket field during the third Test between India and Australia at the Brabourne in 1960. When Baig reached the fifty run mark, a young woman ran onto the ground from the North Stand and kissed him on his cheek in full view of a packed crowd. During a test match in 1964, several members of the visiting England team faced fitness issues, forcing England to request India to provide a substitute fielder. On successive days, A. G. Kripal Singh and Hanumant Singh took the field as substitutes for Micky Stewart.

The one serious instance of crowd trouble at the ground happened in the final session of the fourth day of the Test match between India and Australia in 1969. With India in desperate trouble in the second innings, Ajit Wadekar and Srinivas Venkataraghavan were involved in a partnership of 25 for the eighth wicket when the latter was declared out caught behind off the bowling of Alan Connolly. The decision was criticised by the radio commentators, and as Venkat left the wicket after some hesitation, trouble broke out in the East Stand. Bottles were thrown on the ground and chairs were burned while the awnings were set on fire in the North stand. Play continued for an hour in these circumstances.

Until the 1960s, when international matches were played at the Brabourne, the teams would stay at the CCI itself. In an unusual occurrence, when Gundappa Viswanath completed a hundred runs for India against England in a test match in 1973, he was lifted by opposition fielder Tony Greig.

=== Domestic cricket ===
Sixteen Ranji Trophy finals and a Plate final have been played at the ground between 1938 and 2008. Bombay appeared in fourteen of these and won on each occasion. Among the notable innings played at the ground are Denis Compton's 249 not out for Holkar in the 1944–45 final and Ajit Wadekar's triple century in 1966–67 against Mysore. CCI was the first to introduce single wicket cricket in India. This competition in 1965 was won by Vinoo Mankad. For three years after the termination of the Pentangular, Brabourne hosted an inter-zonal tournament.

== Decline ==
Ever since the Brabourne Stadium was constructed, the CCI had a rough relationship with their tenants – the Bombay Cricket Association (BCA) – owing mostly to the disputes regarding the allotment of seats. In one instance, BCA even threatened to stage a Test at Shivaji Park with temporary stands.

In 1971, BCA President S. K. Wankhede was told by the then CCI President, Vijay Merchant that the BCA would not be allotted any extra seats for the visit of England in 1972. CCI maintained that it spends a large amount in maintaining the ground and any further concessions would lead to substantial loss of revenue to the club. BCA decided to go ahead and construct a new ground of its own. The new Wankhede Stadium hosted its first Test match early in 1975 during the tour of West Indies. Wankhede had superseded Brabourne as the city's international cricket venue. Since then, except for a few first class matches, Brabourne staged few major games until 2006, though international cricket briefly returned to the ground in 1989, when Australia and Pakistan played an ODI against each other.

== Golden Jubilee Celebrations ==
Festival matches were played at the ground to celebrate the golden jubilee of the CCI in 1987–88. Players such as Roger Binny and Mohammed Azharuddin played for a CCI XI, Wasim Akram, Imran Khan, Rameez Raja, and Mudassar Nazar, among others, turned out for Pakistan. Due to shortage of players for Pakistan, Sachin Tendulkar, then just 14 years old, fielded for Pakistan as a substitute. This was Tendulkar's first exposure to international cricket. CCI rules had to be amended to allow the 14-year-old Sachin Tendulkar into the dressing room. Raj Singh Dungarpur, president of the club for several years, was instrumental in the decision to change this rule.

== Return of international cricket ==
=== One Day Internationals ===
International cricket returned to Brabourne in 1989 when Australia played a One Day International (ODI) against Pakistan during the MRF World Series for the Jawaharlal Nehru Cup. South Africa took on West Indies in a 1993 Hero Cup ODI game where Jonty Rhodes took a world record five catches. Rhodes later recollected more than 20,000 people cheering him during this match, something which was rare for him in a foreign country.

Chris Cairns, allegedly drunk, jumped into the CCI swimming pool the night before the deciding sixth ODI between India and New Zealand in 1995. He was dropped by coach Glenn Turner for the match. India won the game and with it the series, with New Zealand scoring their lowest ODI total against India of 126.

=== Tour games ===
In recent years, a few of the teams visiting India have started their tour with a warm up match at the Brabourne. The match between Australia and Mumbai in 1997–98 was noted for Sachin Tendulkar's first double hundred in first-class cricket. Mumbai won the game setting the tone for the rest of the tour. In 2000, several Test level Indian players turned out for a Board Presidents XI in a three-day warm up game against the touring South Africans. The match is remembered for Sachin Tendulkar announcing his resignation from the post of Captain of the Indian team at the press box. In 2006, the CCI Presidents XI played an unofficial three-day game with the visiting England team. Two one-day games were played here in 2014, one between India A and West Indies, the other against Sri Lanka. The stadium also hosted a two-day warm-up match between the Board President's XI and the visiting South African team in 2015. Brabourne Stadium also hosted two One day games between India A and England in early 2017. M.S. Dhoni was the captain of the India A team, the last time he was captaining a team. The stadium was filled to capacity and even though it was a warm up game. England were victorious in the first match while India A won the second game.

=== 2006 ICC Champions Trophy and first T20I ===
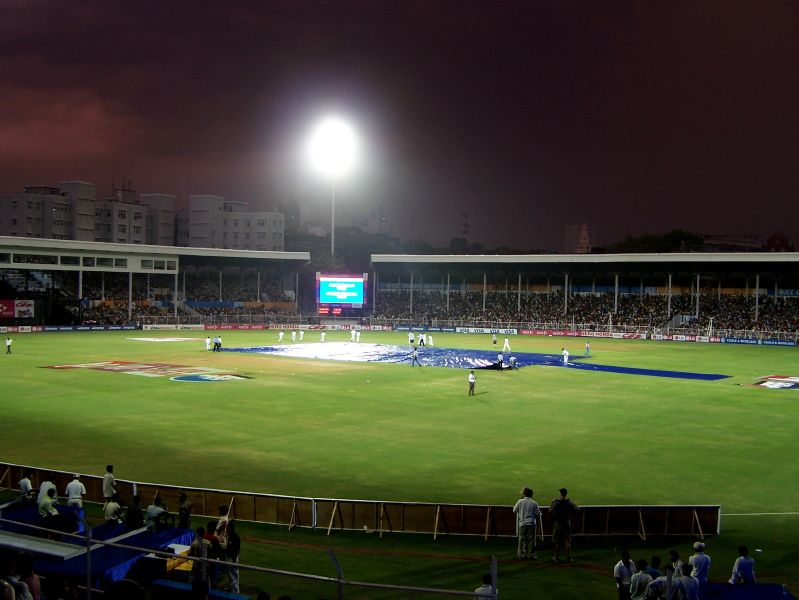
Rain disrupts the 2006 Champions Trophy final under lights at the ground

International cricket returned to the ground after an 11-year hiatus in 2006 for which the ground was renovated. Brabourne Stadium hosted five ODI matches including the final of the 2006 Champions trophy. Floodlights were installed at the ground for this tournament. Raj Singh Dungarpur, then president of the CCI, said "... We are turning a page and it was long awaited. It is like getting married again.". West Indian Jerome Taylor took a hat-trick against Australia in a group match. This was the first by a West Indian in ODIs, and the first in an ICC Champions Trophy. In the finals, the Australia beat the West Indies to claim the title for the first time. The game was hampered by rain and was decided by the Duckworth-Lewis system. The pitch used for the matches faced criticism for being too slow for one-day cricket.

Brabourne Stadium hosted the first Twenty20 International on Indian soil, when India beat Australia in a one-off game in October 2007.

=== Platinum Jubilee Test ===
The Wankhede Stadium underwent renovation between 2008 and Brabourne hosted international and first-class matches in Mumbai during that period. It was scheduled to host a Test match (BCCI's and CCI's Platinum Jubilee Test) against England in December 2008 but the match was switched to the PCA Stadium in Mohali following the 2008 Mumbai attacks. Though the Test match took place at Mohali, the Platinum Jubilee celebrations were shelved.

The ground did finally host another Test match in 2009. After a gap of 36 years, 9 months, and 21 days – the longest gap between two successive Tests at any international ground – Brabourne Stadium hosted a Test match between India and Sri Lanka. Virender Sehwag scored a double century (293), but missed out on becoming the first person to score three triple centuries in Test cricket. India made their highest Test score of 726 for 9 and won the match by an innings. As a result of this win, India topped the ICC Test Championship for the first time. On the first day of the Test, the then Chief Minister of Maharashtra, Ashok Chavan released a book commemorating 75 years of cricket at the CCI.

=== T20 leagues ===
CCI chose not to host the first season of the Indian Premier League (IPL) in 2008 as the IPL authorities wanted the club to hand over the pavilion to them on match days. Members enjoy the privilege of watching all matches from the members only clubhouse free of cost as per their rights enshrined in the club's constitution, something the club was unwilling to let go of and hence chose not to host IPL matches.

As per IPL rules, the winner of the previous competition decides the venue for the finals. In 2009, the reigning Champions, Rajasthan Royals chose the Brabourne Stadium to host the finals of the second season. However, the dispute regarding use of the pavilion meant that no IPL matches could be held at the ground. The members were offered free seats in the stands, however the club rejected the offer, stating that members could not be moved out of the pavilion. In the end, the second season was moved out of India and held in South Africa due to security concerns.

These issues were sorted out in 2010 and the Brabourne Stadium played host to seven home matches of the Mumbai Indians in the third season. The Mumbai Police charged a then record ₹ 9.8 million for providing security for these matches.

The ground was also scheduled to host three matches of the Champions League in 2008, however, the tournament was cancelled due to the 2008 Mumbai attacks.

The stadium successfully hosted the Eliminator of IPL 7, scheduled to be played on 28 May 2014 between reigning IPL Champions Mumbai Indians and two-time IPL winners Chennai Super Kings, in which CSK emerged victorious.

=== Eligible unit ===
At its AGM in September 2013, the BCCI unanimously decided to allot international matches as per its rotation policy thereby bringing the ground back as a regular international venue. However, soon after the decision, the Mumbai Cricket Association objected to the resolution citing commercial reasons.

== Other activities ==
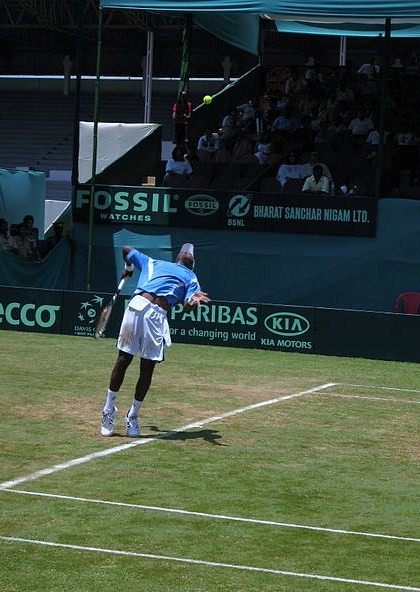
The 2006 Davis Cup match in progress

=== Cricket-related ===
The North Stand of the Brabourne housed the BCCI headquarters and the 1983 Cricket World Cup trophy until 2006 when both were moved to the newly built Cricket Centre at the nearby Wankhede Stadium. The CCI has played host to BCCI AGMs as well as ICC meetings.

The ground has staged one under-19 Test match in 1992 when India played New Zealand as well as one Women's cricket One Day International match, again between India and New Zealand in 2003. In 1995, it was the venue for the Masters cup tournament played by veteran cricketers representing India, Sri Lanka, Australia, West Indies, South Africa, and England. Although the ground has not hosted a World Cup match, it has been used as a practice venue during the 2011 Cricket World Cup.

In December 2012 it was announced that Brabourne would be one of the five venues which will host 2013 Women's Cricket World Cup matches. The final of the tournament was held on 17 February 2013 at Brabourne Stadium where Australia beat West Indies.

=== Concerts and events ===
In 1946, the leader of the Ismaili Muslims, Aga Khan, was weighed in diamonds at the ground, the diamonds were then donated to charity. Jawaharlal Nehru, then Prime Minister of India, addressed a packed Brabourne Stadium during a NUS convention in 1950. Nikita Khrushchev, then chief of the Communist Party of the Soviet Union, delivered a speech to a crowd of approximately 75,000 to 100,000 people at the ground in 1955. In November 1971 a concert was organised at the stadium by the Bangladesh Aid Committee in support of the Bangladesh Liberation War. The Indian National Congress celebrated its centenary at the ground in 1985. During this event, MF Husain was commissioned by the Congress to create 22 paintings within five days at Brabourne. A performance by 700 dancers and thousands of musicians took place at Brabourne in the presence of Pope John Paul II in 1986. The performance interpreted religious themes through Indian dance.

Brabourne was the venue of the second Filmfare Awards ceremony in 1955. The 26th International Film Festival of India was held at the Brabourne in 1995. The ground has played host to a few Music bands. In 1994, Bryan Adams performed at the Brabourne, which was his first concert in India. The Zubin Mehta–led Israel Philharmonic orchestra performed four concerts at Brabourne in 1994, each with a capacity crowd of 15,000. The Rolling Stones performed at the ground during their Licks Tour on 7 April 2003 to a sold-out crowd of 25,000 people. Plácido Domingo performed at the Brabourne in 2008 as part of a concert. Some Indian artists, such as Jagjit Singh and Lata Mangeshkar, have also performed at the ground. Awwal Number, a Bollywood movie starring Aamir Khan and directed by Dev Anand, was shot at the ground in the late 1980s.

=== Other sports ===
The ground hosted its first international tennis fixture in 1963, a Davis Cup tie where India lost to the United States. Brabourne next hosted a Davis Cup match 43 years later in April 2006, an Asia-Oceania second round Group I tennis match where India defeated Pakistan. An ATP Tour tournament, the Kingfisher Airlines Tennis Open, was held at the CCI tennis courts next to the ground in 2006 and 2007. A football exhibition game was held at the ground in 1955 when national champion Bombay played the visiting Soviet Union team. When Brabourne went out of favour for cricket matches in the 1970s, it held dog races and Rovers Cup football matches.

== See also ==
- List of Test cricket grounds
