= Dhruve Pandove Stadium =

Cricket ground

- Location: Patiala, India
- Country: India
- Establishment: 1926
- Capacity: 10,000
- Owner: Punjab Cricket Association
- Operator: Punjab Cricket Association
- Tenants: Punjab cricket team

The Dhruve Pandove Stadium is a cricket ground in Patiala, India. The ground was previously known as Rajendra Gymkhana Club or Baradari Ground. The ground is home ground to the Punjab cricket team. It has hosted 69 first-class matches. Most of Southern Punjab's home games were played at Dhruve Pandove Stadium. The ground is one of the oldest grounds in Punjab. In 2014, the stadium hosted its first first-class match in 17 years between Punjab and Haryana. The stadium is named after cricketer Dhruve Pandove in India who tragically died in a road accident in 1992.
