= Gandhi Sports Complex Ground =

Sports complex located in Amritsar, Punjab, India

Coordinates: 31°38′20″N 74°52′23″E

- Interactive map of Gandhi Sports Complex Ground

Ground information
- Location: Amritsar, Punjab, India
- Country: India
- Establishment: 1933
- Capacity: 16,000 (Gandhi Stadium)
- Owner: Punjab Government
- Operator: Punjab Cricket Association
- Tenants: Indian Cricket Team; Punjab cricket team

International information
- First men's ODI: 12 September 1982: India v Sri Lanka
- Last men's ODI: 18 November 1995: India v New Zealand
- As of 31 March 2014; Source: Gandhi Sports Complex Ground, ESPNcricinfo

The Gandhi Stadium at the Gandhi Sports Complex Ground is located in the city of Amritsar, Punjab, India.

It is currently used for Cricket matches. The stadium was built in 1933, when it was known as the Alexandra Ground. It is currently used as the home ground for two Indian domestic cricket team, Punjab and North Zone. The stadium has hosted 2 ODI matches with the host team - India winning both of these matches.

== One Day International cricket ==
The stadium has hosted following ODI matches till date.

Team (A)	Team (B)	Winner	Margin	Year
India	Sri Lanka	India	By 78 runs	1982
India	New Zealand	India	By 6 wickets	1995

Game Statistics:

Category	Information
Highest Team Score	India (269/7 in 50 Overs against Sri Lanka)
Lowest Team Score	New Zealand (145 All-out in 44.1 Overs against India)
Best Batting Performance	Nathan Astle (59 Runs against India)
Best Bowling Performance	Manoj Prabhakar (5/33 against New Zealand)

== International cricket five-wicket hauls ==
=== Key ===
Symbol	Meaning
†	The bowler was man of the match
‡	10 or more wickets taken in the match
§	One of two five-wicket hauls by the bowler in the match
Date	Day the Test started or ODI was held
Inn	Innings in which five-wicket haul was taken
Overs	Number of overs bowled
Runs	Number of runs conceded
Wkts	Number of wickets taken
Econ	Runs conceded per over
Batsmen	Batsmen whose wickets were taken
Result	Result of the match

=== ODIs ===
Five-wicket hauls in ODI matches at Gandhi Sports Complex Ground
No.	Bowler	Date	Team	Opposing team	Inn	Overs	Runs	Wkts	Econ	Batsmen	Result
1	Manoj Prabhakar	18 November 1995	India	New Zealand	1	10	33	5	3.30	Mark Greatbatch; Martin Crowe; Shane Thomson; Lee Germon; Dion Nash	India won
