= York Cemetery =

York Cemetery is the name of several cemeteries:

- York Cemetery, Toronto, Ontario, Canada
- York Cemetery, York, England
- York Cemetery, New Delhi, India
