= Alan Incell Riley =

RFC air ace

Captain Alan Incell Riley AFC
- Born: 9 December 1897; London, England
- Died: 17 December 1960 (aged 63); London, England
- Military career
- Allegiance: United Kingdom
- Branch: British Army; Royal Flying Corp; Royal Air Force
- Service years: 1914–1919; 1923–1928
- Rank: Captain
- Service number: 6122
- Unit: No. 48 Squadron RAF
- Conflicts: First World War
- Awards: Air Force Cross
- Other work: Commercial Pilot; Flight Instructor; Company Director

Lieutenant Alan Incell Riley (9 December 1897 – 17 December 1960) was a British World War I flying ace credited with five aerial victories.

== Early life ==
Riley was born in London on 9 December 1897 to George and Margaret Riley of Clacton and was educated at Malvern College.

== Military service ==
Riley began his military service as a Private with the Artists Rifles.

He served in the Royal Flying Corps between 1916 and 1919. Riley rejoined the forces, being in the Royal Air Force from 1923 to 1928. On 2 July 1932 Riley gave up his commission upon completion of his service.

In 1919, Riley was awarded the Air Force Cross.

== Other work ==
=== Airco Ltd ===
Between 1919 and 1920, Riley flew the London to Paris route as a pilot with Airco Ltd.

=== Westland Aircraft Works ===
In 1928, he worked at the Westland Aircraft Works.

=== India ===
==== Delhi Flying Club ====
From 1928 Riley was an instructor at the Delhi Flying Club and flew Lady Willingdon from Delhi to Calcutta in a de Havilland Puss Moth aircraft. The aeroplane was lent for the journey by Grant Govan who was president of the club.

==== Viceroy's Cup ====
In 1933, Riley won the Viceroy's Cup, which was a 700-mile handicap air race beginning and ending in Delhi. The route took competitors through Bareilly, Lucknow, Agra and Rampur with a stop at each place. His average speed in winning the race was 115 mph.

==== Survey Flight ====
Also in 1933 he made a 1,500 mile survey flight on behalf of Indian National Airways. This was to examine a possible link up between cities in northern India and the Indian Trans-Continental Airways' service.

== Later life ==
In later life Riley worked as a company director.

He died in London on 17 December 1960 at the age of 63.

== Personal life ==
He was married to Ella Adele Van Os at St. Mary Abbots Church in Kensington, London on 19 June 1926. Ella is recorded in the 1939 England and Wales Register as being a member of the Civil Nursing Reserve.
