= Alan Riley =

Alan Riley may refer to:

- Alan Riley (rugby union), rugby union referee
- Alan Incell Riley (1897–1960), British World War I flying ace
