= 2014–15 Vijay Hazare Trophy =

Indian cricket tournament

- Dates: 6 November 2014 – 25 November 2014
- Administrator(s): BCCI
- Cricket format: List A cricket
- Tournament format(s): Round robin, then knockout
- Champions: Karnataka (2nd title)
- Runners-up: Punjab
- Participants: 27
- Most runs: Manish Pandey (Karnataka) (472)
- Most wickets: Abhimanyu Mithun (Karnataka) (18)

The 2014–15 Vijay Hazare Trophy was the 22nd edition of the Vijay Hazare Trophy, an annual List A cricket tournament in India. It took place between 6 and 25 November 2014. In the final, holders Karnataka defeated Punjab by 156 runs to successfully defend their title.

== Format ==
The teams are divided across five zonal groups: Central Zone, East Zone, North Zone, South Zone and West Zone. The top two teams from Central Zone, East Zone and South Zone advance directly to the quarterfinals. The top two teams from each of North Zone and West Zone play in the pre-quarterfinals to determine which two teams advance to the quarterfinals. The winner of the knockout tree is declared winner of the tournament.

== Group stage ==
=== Central Zone ===
Teams	Matches	Won	Lost	Tie/NR	Points	NRR
Railways	4	4	0	0	16	+1.459
Vidarbha	4	3	1	0	12	+1.223
Uttar Pradesh	4	2	2	0	8	-0.260
Rajasthan	4	1	3	0	4	-1.891
Madhya Pradesh	4	0	4	0	0	-0.611

7 November
Scorecard

Railways; 255/9 (50 overs)	v	Uttar Pradesh; 216 (47.4 overs)

Railways won by 39 runs
VCA Stadium, Nagpur

7 November
Scorecard

Vidarbha; 285 (49.3 overs)	v	Rajasthan; 151 (36.1 overs)

Vidarbha won by 134 runs
VCA Ground, Nagpur

8 November
Scorecard

Madhya Pradesh; 250/6 (50 overs)	v	Uttar Pradesh; 252/7 (48 overs)

Uttar Pradesh won by 3 wickets
VCA Ground, Nagpur

8 November
Scorecard

Vidarbha; 206 (49.2 overs)	v	Railways; 210/6 (48.1 overs)

Railways won by 4 wickets
VCA Stadium, Nagpur

10 November
Scorecard

Madhya Pradesh; 241/5 (50 overs)	v	Railways; 245/5 (47.4 overs)

Railways won by 5 wickets
VCA Stadium, Nagpur

10 November
Scorecard

Uttar Pradesh; 283/8 (50 overs)	v	Rajasthan; 208/8 (50 overs)

Uttar Pradesh won by 75 runs
VCA Ground, Nagpur

11 November
Scorecard

Madhya Pradesh; 193 (48.2 overs)	v	Vidarbha; 167/6 (38 overs)

Vidarbha won by 4 wickets (VJD method)
VCA Stadium, Nagpur

11 November
Scorecard

Rajasthan; 35 (15.3 overs)	v	Railways; 39/1 (5.3 overs)

Railways won by 9 wickets
VCA Ground, Nagpur

13 November
Scorecard

Rajasthan; 316/6 (50 overs)	v	Madhya Pradesh; 239 (46.3 overs)

Rajasthan won by 77 runs
VCA Ground, Nagpur

13 November
Scorecard

Uttar Pradesh; 112 (37 overs)	v	Vidarbha; 113/1 (28.5 overs)

Vidarbha won by 9 wickets
VCA Stadium, Nagpur

=== East Zone ===
Teams	Matches	Won	Lost	Tie/NR	Points	NRR
Bengal	4	4	0	0	16	+1.709
Odisha	4	2	2	0	8	+0.237
Assam	4	2	2	0	8	-0.244
Jharkhand	4	2	2	0	8	-0.244
Tripura	4	0	4	0	0	-1.416

6 November
Scorecard

Tripura; 160 (46.2 overs)	v	Assam; 161/3 (32.2 overs)

Assam won by 7 wickets
Jadavpur University Campus 2nd Ground, Kolkata

6 November
Scorecard

Bengal; 220/6 (50 overs)	v	Odisha; 195 (46.4 overs)

Bengal won by 25 runs
Bengal Cricket Academy Ground, Kalyani

9 November
Scorecard

Assam; 103 (44.3 overs)	v	Odisha; 105/5 (23.2 overs)

Odisha won by 5 wickets
Bengal Cricket Academy Ground, Kalyani

9 November
Scorecard

Tripura; 173 (48.3 overs)	v	Jharkhand; 178/2 (33.3 overs)

Jharkhand won by 8 wickets
Jadavpur University Campus 2nd Ground, Kolkata

11 November
Scorecard

Bengal; 310/3 (50 overs)	v	Jharkhand; 147 (31 overs)

Bengal won by 163 runs
Jadavpur University Campus 2nd Ground, Kolkata

11 November
Scorecard

Odisha; 195 (49.3 overs)	v	Tripura; 192 (49 overs)

Odisha won by 3 runs
Bengal Cricket Academy Ground, Kalyani

13 November
Scorecard

Jharkhand; 191/8 (50 overs)	v	Assam; 195/3 (47.3 overs)

Assam won by 7 wickets
Jadavpur University Campus 2nd Ground, Kolkata

13 November
Scorecard

Tripura; 121 (38.3 overs)	v	Bengal; 125/1 (26 overs)

Bengal won by 9 wickets
Bengal Cricket Academy Ground, Kalyani

15 November
Scorecard

Bengal; 312/6 (50 overs)	v	Assam; 294/8 (50 overs)

Bengal won by 18 runs
Eden Gardens, Kolkata

15 November
Scorecard

Jharkhand; 280/5 (50 overs)	v	Odisha; 235 (46.5 overs)

Jharkhand won by 45 runs
Jadavpur University Campus 2nd Ground, Kolkata

=== North Zone ===
Teams	Matches	Won	Lost	Tie/NR	Points	NRR
Punjab	5	3	2	0	12	+0.557
Delhi	5	3	2	0	12	+0.428
Himachal Pradesh	5	3	2	0	12	+0.263
Jammu and Kashmir	5	3	2	0	12	-0.511
Services	5	2	3	0	8	+0.313
Haryana	5	1	4	0	4	-1.159

6 November
Scorecard

Delhi; 212/8 (50 overs)	v	Jammu and Kashmir; 216/8 (49.2 overs)

Jammu and Kashmir won by 2 wickets
Luhnu Cricket Ground, Bilaspur

6 November
Scorecard

Punjab; 252/8 (50 overs)	v	Haryana; 253/7 (49.1 overs)

Haryana won by 3 wickets
Atal Bihari Vajpayee Stadium, Nadaun

6 November
Scorecard

Himachal Pradesh; 181 (45.2 overs)	v	Services; 182/8 (40 overs)

Services won by 2 wickets
HPCA Stadium, Dharamshala

8 November
Scorecard

Punjab; 182/6 (45 overs)	v	Delhi; 188/6 (44 overs)

Delhi won by 4 wickets
Atal Bihari Vajpayee Stadium, Nadaun

8 November
Scorecard

Haryana; 163 (48.3 overs)	v	Himachal Pradesh; 166/4 (38 overs)

Himachal Pradesh won by 6 wickets
HPCA Stadium, Dharamshala

8 November
Scorecard

Services; 236/9 (50 overs)	v	Jammu and Kashmir; 237/7 (49.1 overs)

Jammu and Kashmir won by 3 wickets
Luhnu Cricket Ground, Bilaspur

10 November
Scorecard

Himachal Pradesh; 244/6 (50 overs)	v	Delhi; 231 (50 overs)

Himachal Pradesh won by 13 runs
HPCA Stadium, Dharamshala

10 November
Scorecard

Haryana; 75 (28 overs)	v	Services; 77/2 (16.5 overs)

Services won by 8 wickets
Luhnu Cricket Ground, Bilaspur

10 November
Scorecard

Jammu and Kashmir; 227 (49.3 overs)	v	Punjab; 233/3 (43 overs)

Punjab won by 7 wickets
Atal Bihari Vajpayee Stadium, Nadaun

12 November
Scorecard

Haryana; 247 (50 overs)	v	Delhi; 251/7 (42.1 overs)

Delhi won by 3 wickets
HPCA Stadium, Dharamshala

12 November
Scorecard

Jammu and Kashmir; 132 (37 overs)	v	Himachal Pradesh; 133/1 (28.3 overs)

Himachal Pradesh won by 9 wickets
Atal Bihari Vajpayee Stadium, Nadaun

12 November
Scorecard

Services; 200 (42.1 overs)	v	Punjab; 204/4 (41.2 overs)

Punjab won by 6 wickets
Luhnu Cricket Ground, Bilaspur

14 November
Scorecard

Services; 146 (40.1 overs)	v	Delhi; 148/7 (34.4 overs)

Delhi won by 3 wickets
HPCA Stadium, Dharamshala

14 November
Scorecard

Himachal Pradesh; 196 (48.4 overs)	v	Punjab; 201/7 (38 overs)

Punjab won by 3 wickets
Luhnu Cricket Ground, Bilaspur

14 November
Scorecard

Jammu and Kashmir; 284/8 (50 overs)	v	Haryana; 276 (49.4 overs)

Jammu & Kashmir won by 8 runs
Atal Bihari Vajpayee Stadium, Nadaun

=== South Zone ===
Teams	Matches	Won	Lost	Tie/NR	Points	NRR
Karnataka	5	4	0	1	18	+2.012
Goa	5	3	2	0	12	+0.083
Andhra	5	2	2	1	10	-0.607
Tamil Nadu	5	2	2	1	10	-0.758
Kerala	5	1	3	1	6	+0.425
Hyderabad	5	1	4	0	4	-0.958

7 November
Scorecard

Karnataka; 330/7 (50 overs)	v	Andhra; 196 (47.4 overs)

Karnataka won by 134 runs
AOC Centre Thapar Stadium, Secunderabad

7 November
Scorecard

Kerala; 283/7 (50 overs)	v	Goa; 287/8 (49.1 overs)

Goa won by 2 wickets
Nuclear Fuel Complex Ground, Secunderabad

7 November
Scorecard

Tamil Nadu; 334/6 (50 overs)	v	Hyderabad; 287 (47.2 overs)

Tamil Nadu won by 47 runs
Gymkhana Ground, Secunderabad

8 November
Scorecard

Hyderabad; 193 (50 overs)	v	Andhra; 194/3 (44.1 overs)

Andhra won by 7 wickets
Gymkhana Ground, Secunderabad

8 November
Scorecard

Goa; 183 (40.2 overs)	v	Karnataka; 185/3 (27.3 overs)

Karnataka won by 7 wickets
Nuclear Fuel Complex Ground, Secunderabad

8 November
Scorecard

Kerala; 254 (49.2 overs)	v	Tamil Nadu; 255/6 (49.5 overs)

Tamil Nadu won by 4 wickets
AOC Centre Thapar Stadium, Secunderabad

10 November
Scorecard

Goa; 217 (46.4 overs)	v	Andhra; 172 (46.1 overs)

Goa won by 45 runs
AOC Centre Thapar Stadium, Secunderabad

10 November
Scorecard

Kerala; 321/9 (50 overs)	v	Hyderabad; 188 (43.5 overs)

Kerala won by 133 runs
Nuclear Fuel Complex Ground, Secunderabad

10 November
Scorecard

Karnataka; 313/6 (50 overs)	v	Tamil Nadu; 209 (43.5 overs)

Karnataka won by 104 runs
Gymkhana Ground, Secunderabad

11 November
Scorecard

Kerala; 202/9 (50 overs)	v	Andhra; 206/4 (43 overs)

Andhra won by 6 wickets
AOC Centre Thapar Stadium, Secunderabad

11 November
Scorecard

Tamil Nadu; 182 (49.2 overs)	v	Goa; 184/4 (33.2 overs)

Goa won by 6 wickets
Gymkhana Ground, Secunderabad

11 November
Scorecard

Hyderabad; 295/7 (50 overs)	v	Karnataka; 300/5 (48 overs)

Karnataka won by 5 wickets
Nuclear Fuel Complex Ground, Secunderabad

13 November
Scorecard

Andhra	v	Tamil Nadu

Match abandoned
AOC Centre Thapar Stadium, Secunderabad

13 November
Scorecard

Karnataka	v	Kerala

Match abandoned
Gymkhana Ground, Secunderabad

13 November
Scorecard

Goa; 170 (33.3 overs)	v	Hyderabad; 171/3 (32.4 overs)

Hyderabad won by 7 wickets
Rajiv Gandhi International Stadium, Hyderabad

=== West Zone ===
Teams	Matches	Won	Lost	Tie/NR	Points	NRR
Mumbai	4	3	1	0	12	+0.166
Gujarat	4	3	1	0	12	+0.291
Baroda	4	2	2	0	8	+0.086
Saurashtra	4	1	3	0	4	-0.134
Maharashtra	4	1	3	0	4	-0.430

8 November
Scorecard

Baroda; 313/7 (50 overs)	v	Gujarat; 315/5 (49.3 overs)

Gujarat won by 5 wickets
Sardar Patel Stadium B Ground, Ahmedabad

8 November
Scorecard

Saurashtra; 279/5 (50 overs)	v	Mumbai; 280/8 (49.4 overs)

Mumbai won by 2 wickets
Sardar Patel Stadium C Ground, Ahmedabad

9 November
Scorecard

Mumbai; 201 (45.3 overs)	v	Baroda; 197 (47.1 overs)

Mumbai won by 4 runs
Sardar Patel Stadium C Ground, Ahmedabad

9 November
Scorecard

Maharashtra; 266/9 (50 overs)	v	Gujarat; 269/5 (48.1 overs)

Gujarat won by 5 wickets
Sardar Patel Stadium B Ground, Ahmedabad

11 November
Scorecard

Maharashtra; 243 (49.4 overs)	v	Baroda; 244/3 (45.5 overs)

Baroda won by 7 wickets
Sardar Patel Stadium B Ground, Ahmedabad

11 November
Scorecard

Gujarat; 349/5 (50 overs)	v	Saurashtra; 265/8 (49.4 overs)

Gujarat won by 84 runs
Sardar Patel Stadium, Ahmedabad

12 November
Scorecard

Baroda; 268/9 (50 overs)	v	Saurashtra; 265 (49.5 overs)

Baroda won by 3 runs
Sardar Patel Stadium B Ground, Ahmedabad

12 November
Scorecard

Mumbai; 211 (44.2 overs)	v	Maharashtra; 214/4 (48 overs)

Maharashtra won by 6 wickets
Sardar Patel Stadium, Ahmedabad

14 November
Scorecard

Gujarat; 256/7 (50 overs)	v	Mumbai; 258/3 (42.3 overs)

Mumbai won by 7 wickets
Sardar Patel Stadium, Ahmedabad

14 November
Scorecard

Saurashtra; 303/5 (50 overs)	v	Maharashtra; 240/8 (50 overs)

Saurashtra won by 63 runs
Sardar Patel Stadium B Ground, Ahmedabad

== Knockout stage ==
Pre-quarterfinals
N2	Delhi
W1	Mumbai
W2	Gujarat
N1	Punjab

Quarterfinals
S1	Karnataka
W1	Mumbai
E1	Bengal
C2	Vidarbha
E2	Odisha
S2	Goa
C1	Railways
N1	Punjab

Semifinals
S1	Karnataka
E1	Bengal
E2	Odisha
N1	Punjab

Final
S1	Karnataka
N1	Punjab

=== Pre-quarterfinals ===
19 November
Scorecard

Delhi; 157 (42.3 overs)	v	Mumbai; 158/4 (30.3 overs)
Milind Kumar 64 (94); Shardul Thakur 3/25 (7 overs)		Wasim Jaffer 83* (87); Sumit Narwal 2/31 (9 overs)

Mumbai won by 6 wickets
Saurashtra Cricket Association Stadium, Rajkot

- Mumbai won the toss and elected to field
- Mumbai advanced to the quarterfinals

19 November
Scorecard

Punjab; 255/8 (50 overs)	v	Gujarat; 227 (47.3 overs)
Amitoze Singh 75 (115); Rush Kalaria 3/55 (10 overs)		Rohit Dahiya 53 (60); Sandeep Sharma 3/39 (9 overs)

Punjab won by 28 runs
Madhavrao Scindia Cricket Ground, Rajkot

- Gujarat won the toss and elected to field
- Punjab advanced to the quarterfinals

=== Quarterfinals ===
20 November
Scorecard

Bengal; 318/5 (50 overs)	v	Vidarbha; 301/8 (50 overs)
Manoj Tiwary 130 (101); Ravikumar Thakur 2/77 (10 overs)		Faiz Fazal 105 (111); Veer Pratap Singh 6/51 (10 overs)

Bengal won by 17 runs
Saurashtra Cricket Association Stadium, Rajkot

- Vidarbha won the toss and elected to field
- Bengal advanced to the semifinals

20 November
Scorecard

Odisha; 289 (49.4 overs)	v	Goa; 288/9 (50 overs)
Anurag Sarangi 112 (112); Saurabh Bandekar 5/37 (10 overs)		Amogh Desai 110 (139); Dhiraj Singh 2/35 (6 overs)

Odisha won by 1 run
Madhavrao Scindia Cricket Ground, Rajkot

- Goa won the toss and elected to field
- Odisha advanced to the semifinals

21 November
Scorecard

Mumbai; 286/8 (50 overs)	v	Karnataka; 287/6 (50 overs)
Shreyas Iyer 77 (67); Abhimanyu Mithun 2/57 (10 overs)		Manish Pandey 99* (112); Wilkin Mota 2/39 (7 overs)

Karnataka won by 4 wickets
IPCL Sports Complex Ground, Vadodara

- Karnataka won the toss and elected to field
- Karnataka advanced to the semifinals

21 November
Scorecard

Railways; 243/9 (50 overs)	v	Punjab; 247/5 (47.2 overs)
Anustup Majumdar 76 (100); Baltej Singh 5/33 (10 overs)		Gurkeerat Singh 56* (54); Amit Mishra 3/42 (10 overs)

Punjab won by 5 wickets
Moti Bagh Stadium, Vadodara

- Punjab won the toss and elected to field
- Punjab advanced to the semifinals

=== Semifinals ===
23 November
Scorecard

Karnataka; 268/9 (50 overs)	v	Bengal; 262 (49.5 overs)
Stuart Binny 50 (69); Veer Pratap Singh 3/76 (10 overs)		Sudip Chatterjee 67 (68); Abhimanyu Mithun 3/40 (9.5 overs)

Karnataka won by 6 runs
Sardar Patel Stadium, Ahmedabad

- Bengal won the toss and elected to field
- Karnataka advanced to the finals

23 November
Scorecard

Odisha; 238/7 (50 overs)	v	Punjab; 244/3 (48.3 overs)
Arabind Singh 89 (100); Baltej Singh 2/55 (10 overs)		Amitoze Singh 91 (126); Suryakant Pradhan 1/22 (8 overs)

Punjab won by 7 wickets
Sardar Patel Stadium B Ground, Ahmedabad

- Punjab won the toss and elected to field
- Punjab advanced to the finals

=== Final ===
25 November
Scorecard

Karnataka; 359/7 (50 overs)	v	Punjab; 203 (38.2 overs)
Mayank Agarwal 125 (100); Baltej Singh 3/59 (9 overs)		Mandeep Singh 76 (81); Abhimanyu Mithun 3/37 (6.2 overs)

Karnataka won by 156 runs
Sardar Patel Stadium, Ahmedabad
Umpires: Anil Chaudhary and Nitin Menon

- Punjab won the toss and elected to field
- Karnataka won the 2014–15 Vijay Hazare Trophy

== Statistics ==
=== Most runs ===
Player	Team	Inns	Runs	Ave	HS	100s	50s
Manish Pandey	Karnataka	7	472	118.00	101*	1	4
Shreevats Goswami	Bengal	6	447	111.75	133	2	2
Mayank Agarwal	Karnataka	7	426	60.85	162	2	1
Amitoze Singh	Punjab	9	422	46.88	91	0	4
Mandeep Singh	Punjab	9	417	52.12	103*	1	3

=== Most wickets ===
Player	Team	Inns	Wickets	Ave.	BBI	4w	5w
Abhimanyu Mithun	Karnataka	7	18	15.61	4/18	2	0
Sandeep Sharma	Punjab	6	17	15.52	5/31	0	1
Veer Pratap Singh	Bengal	6	15	16.33	6/51	0	2
Pankaj Singh	Rajasthan	4	14	11.28	6/50	1	1
Baltej Singh	Punjab	7	14	19.57	5/33	0	1
