= Dhruv Pandove =

Indian cricketer

Personal information
- Full name: Dhruv Mahender Pandove
- Born: 9 January 1974; Patiala, Punjab, India
- Died: 31 January 1992 (aged 18); Ambala, Haryana, India
- Nickname: Munna
- Batting: Left-handed
- Bowling: Leg break googly
- Role: Opening batsman
- Relatives: M. P. Pandove (father)

Domestic team information
- Years: Team
- 1987/88–1991/92: Punjab

Career statistics
Competition	FC	List A
Matches	23	6
Runs scored	1,090	281
Batting average	35.16	46.83
100s/50s	2/6	0/2
Top score	170	73
Balls bowled	186	–
Wickets	2	–
Bowling average	49.00	–
5 wickets in innings	0	–
10 wickets in match	0	n/a
Best bowling	1/5	–
Catches/stumpings	8/–	0/–
- Source: ESPNcricinfo, 30 December 2015

Dhruv Mahender Pandove (9 January 1974 – 31 January 1992) was an Indian first-class cricketer who played for Punjab. He made his first-class debut at the age of 13 and was considered to be an "exceptionally gifted batsman" and a "prodigy". He became the youngest Indian and one of the youngest players in the world to score a century in first-class cricket, with his 137 against Jammu and Kashmir in 1988 coming at the age of 14 years and 294 days. He was the youngest player to reach the 1000-run mark in Ranji Trophy, reaching the milestone at the age of 17 years and 341 days.

On the night of 31 January 1992, Pandove was killed in a road accident in Ambala.

== Life and career ==
Pandove was born on 9 January 1974 in Patiala. His father M. P. Pandove was a first-class cricketer who appeared in 75 first-class matches playing for Southern Punjab, Punjab, and North Zone, and later became a cricket administrator.

Pandove came into the limelight after scoring heavily for Punjab under-15s and under-17s. Following scores of 159 against Jammu and Kashmir under-17s and 51 against Delhi under-17s in the 1987–88 Vijay Hazare Trophy, Pandove made his first-class debut in November 1987 at the age of 13 and scored 94 in that match against Himachal Pradesh. He captained North Zone under-15s in the 1987–88 Vijay Merchant Trophy and scored 206 in the semifinal against Central Zone under-15s, followed by 117 and 42 not out in the final against East Zone under-15s, leading his team to the title.

In October 1988, playing only his third first-class match, Pandove hit 137 against Jammu and Kashmir at Srinagar. With this century, he became the youngest Indian and one of the youngest players in the world to score a first-class century, at the age of 14 years and 294 days.

He was then selected in the India under-19 squad and was part of the team that won the U19 Test series in Pakistan in 1988/89 as well as the one that toured Bangladesh and won the U19 Asia Cup the following year. He became captain of Punjab under-19s for the 1990–91 Cooch Behar Trophy in which he scored back-to-back hundreds. He scored 64 on his List A debut in December 1990.

In December 1991, playing for Punjab in a 1991–92 Ranji Trophy match against Services, Pandove made his highest first-class score of 170. He passed the 1000-run mark in Ranji Trophy during the innings and became the youngest player to do so, at the age of 17 years and 341 days. It also turned out to be his last Ranji Trophy match.

In January 1992, he captained North Zone under-19s and led them to the CK Nayudu Trophy title with scores of 73 against Central Zone in the semifinal and 87 against South Zone in the final. On 28 January 1992, Pandove top-scored for North Zone with 73, his highest List A score, against a South Zone bowling attack consisting of Anil Kumble, Venkatesh Prasad, Aashish Kapoor and Arshad Ayub, in the Deodhar Trophy quarterfinal at Sambalpur. He was awarded man of the match, although North Zone lost the match and were eliminated from the tournament.

== Death ==
At the conclusion of the Deodhar Trophy quarterfinal, Pandove was travelling from Sambalpur to his hometown Patiala. After getting off the train at Ambala Cantt, he took a cab to Patiala on the night of 31 January 1992. He died near Ambala as the cab met with an accident on the Grand Trunk Road. The cab driver was also killed and Pandove's friend Bittu was critically injured. Pandove's death was mentioned by BBC and the Australian commentators of the Australia-India Test match that was happening at Perth. The Indian team observed a two minutes' silence before the start of the match.

The Baradari Ground in Patiala was renamed as "Dhruve Pandove Stadium" in 1992. The Pandove family started a trust called the Dhruv Pandove Trust in 1994. According to the Tribune, the main goals of the trust were "to promote the game, nurture young talent and also organise blood donation camps to commemorate the death of Dhruv." The trust also assumed the management of the Dhruve Pandove Stadium and has since been responsible for its maintenance. In 1999, the trust started training young cricketers.

The Punjab Cricket Association started a cricket tournament named after Pandove (Dhruv Pandove Trophy) in 2011.

== Playing style ==
Pandove started as a right-handed batsman, but later changed to left-hand. He did not obtain much formal cricket training, and picked up tips from his father. Sachin Tendulkar, who knew Pandove from his early career, wrote in a mail in 2011 that Pandove was a "fantastic left hander with a lot of talent and class" and that he "had a wonderful future as a cricketer ahead of him." He added, "I think my association with Dhruv in my earlier cricketing days has a lot of bearing on my eventual success in the International arena." Pandove's teammate Ajay Jadeja recalls Pandove as "fearless" with an "infectious spirit to fight", while Vikram Rathour commended his maturity and intelligence about cricket.
