= Maharaja Yadavindra Singh International Cricket Stadium =

Cricket stadium

- New Punjab Cricket Association Stadium
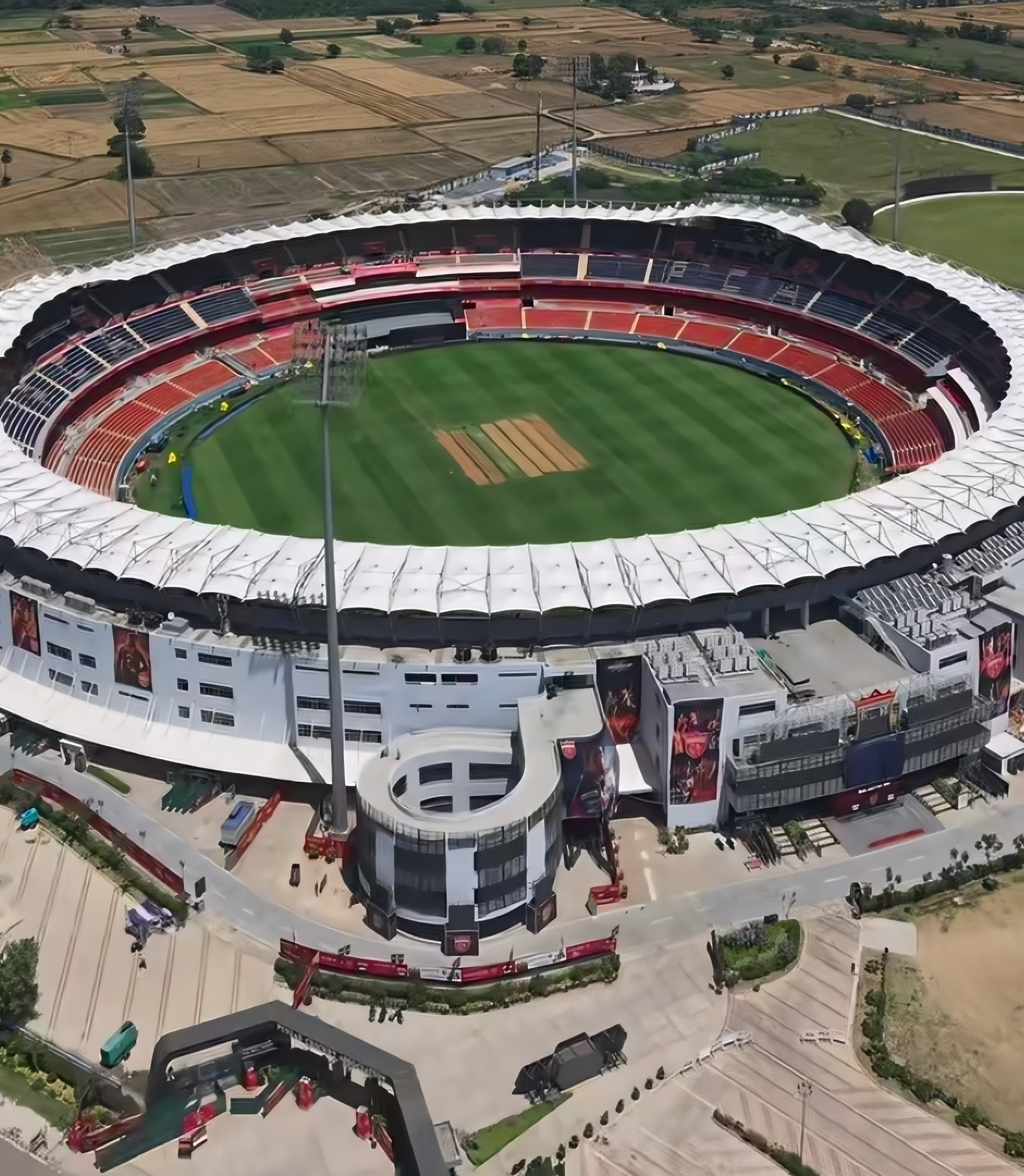
- Aerial view of the stadium
- Interactive map of Maharaja Yadavindra Singh International Cricket Stadium

Ground information
- Location: New Chandigarh, Mullanpur, Mohali District, Punjab, India
- Country: India
- Establishment: 2021 (5 years ago)
- Capacity: 38,000
- Owner: Punjab Cricket Association
- Operator: Punjab Cricket Association
- Tenants: Punjab cricket team (2021-present); Punjab women's cricket team (2021-present); Indian national cricket team (2021-present); India women's national cricket team (2021-present); Punjab Kings (2021-present)

International information
- Only men's Test: 6–10 June 2026: India v Afghanistan
- Only men's ODI: 3 October 2026: India v West Indies
- Only men's T20I: 11 December 2025: India v South Africa
- First women's ODI: 14 September 2025: India v Australia
- Last women's ODI: 17 September 2025: India v Australia
- As of 11 December 2025; Source: ESPNcricinfo

The Maharaja Yadavindra Singh International Cricket Stadium or New Punjab Cricket Association Stadium is a cricket stadium in New Chandigarh (Mullanpur), Mohali District, Punjab, India.

== History ==
In March 2010, the Punjab Cricket Association announced that the planned township of New Chandigarh near the town of Mullanpur in Mohali district is going to have an international standard cricket stadium spread over 41.95 acre at cost of ₹230 crore (US$29 million). It is named after the ninth and last ruling Maharaja of Patiala, Yadavindra Singh.

From 2024, it is the home ground for the Punjab Kings for the Indian Premier League.

On 11 December 2025 ahead of the second T20I between India and South Africa, the PCA named two stands of the stadium after former India all-rounder Yuvraj Singh and World Cup winning captain Harmanpreet Kaur.

== Facilities ==
Accommodating up to 38,000 spectators, the new flood-lit stadium features a sophisticated herringbone drainage system, which facilitates water removal within 25-30 minutes of rain. The stadium's field is composed of sand instead of conventional soil, which offers better stability, but is more challenging to maintain. The venue has two international-grade dressing rooms with steam, sauna, and ice bath facilities with a fully equipped gymnasium. There is a well-equipped media centre, modern lounges and turnstiles.

== See also ==
- List of stadiums in India
- List of cricket grounds by capacity
- List of international cricket grounds in India
- Inderjit Singh Bindra Stadium
