= Bengal Cricket Academy Ground =

Cricket ground

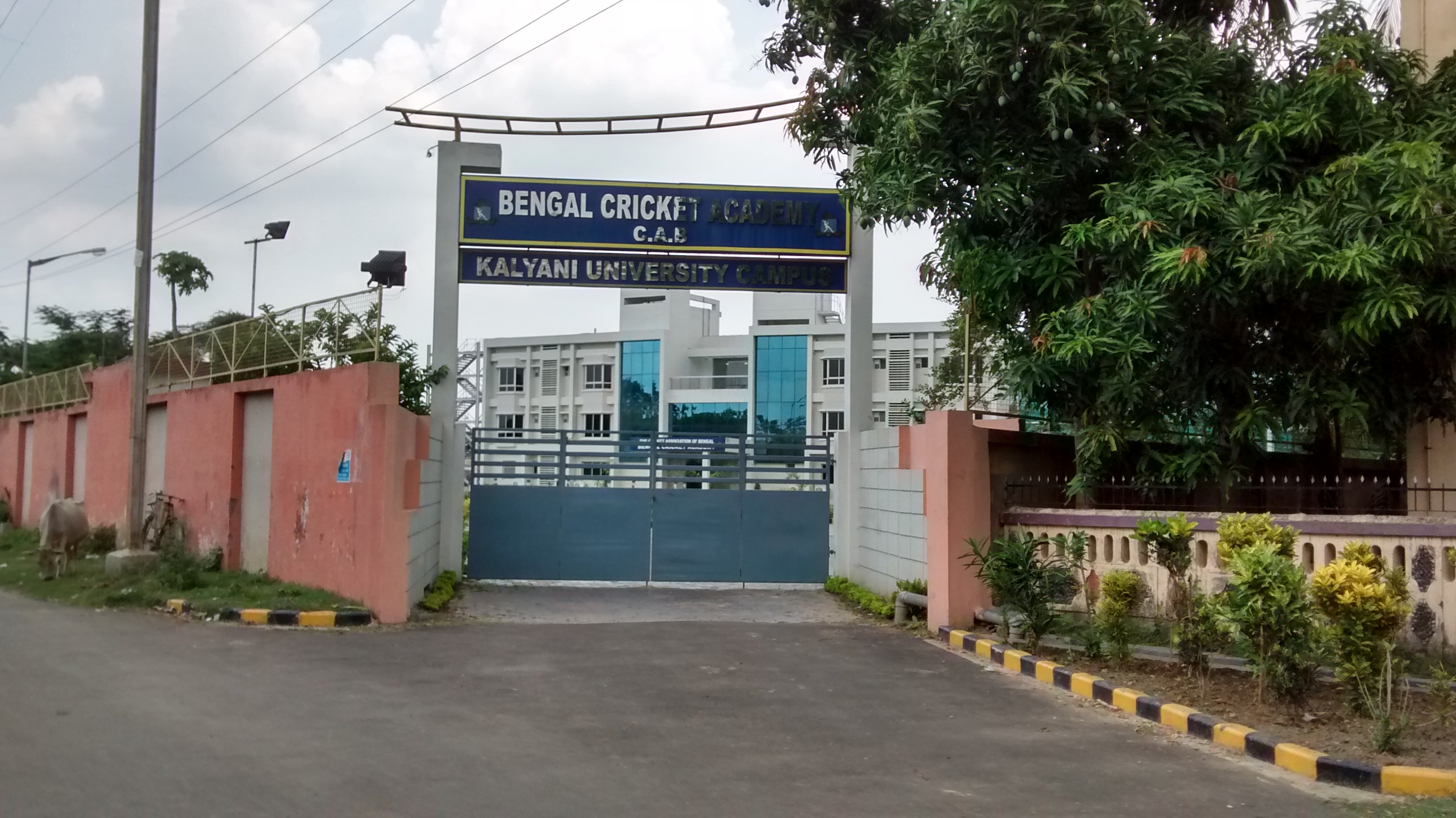
- Location: Kalyani, West Bengal, India
- Coordinates: 22°58′45.61″N 88°26′27.70″E
- Establishment: 2011/12 (first recorded match)
- As of 5 September 2016; Source: Ground profile

Bengal Cricket Academy Ground is a cricket ground in Kalyani, West Bengal, India. The first recorded match on the ground was in 2011/12. It was used as a venue for a first-class match in the 2015–16 Ranji Trophy tournament between Bengal and Odisha. It had previously hosted four List A matches in the 2014–15 Vijay Hazare Trophy.

== See also ==
- List of cricket grounds in India
