= Anthony de Mello (cricket administrator) =

Indian cricketer (1900–1961)

Personal information
- Born: 11 October 1900; Karachi, Bombay Presidency, British India
- Died: 24 May 1961 (aged 60); Delhi, India
- Bowling: Right-handed medium pace

Career statistics
Competition	First-class
Matches	11
Runs scored	82
Batting average	5.12
100s/50s	0/0
Top score	15
Balls bowled	1350
Wickets	17
Bowling average	38.23
5 wickets in innings	1
10 wickets in match	0
Best bowling	6/66
Catches/stumpings	2/0
- Source: CricketArchive

6th President of BCCI
- In office 1946–1951
- Preceded by: P. Subbarayan
- Succeeded by: J. C. Mukherji

Anthony Stanislaus de Mello (11 October 1900 – 24 May 1961) was an Indian cricket administrator and one of the founders of the Board of Control for Cricket in India (BCCI). He also helped launch the Asian Games as the chairman of the organising committee for the first Asian Games in Delhi.

== Background ==
Anthony de Mello was born in Karachi in a migrant Goan family. He did his schooling from St. Patrick's High School. Sind College, and Downing College at the University of Cambridge. He started his career in the services of the businessman R. E. Grant Govan in Delhi, with whom he collaborated in founding the BCCI.

== Career ==
=== BCCI and the CCI ===
The BCCI had its origins in a meeting in February 1927 at the Roshanara Club in Delhi between Arthur Gilligan, the captain of the visiting Marylebone Cricket Club (MCC) team, De Mello, Grant Govan and the Maharaja of Patiala. The decision to form the board was taken at another meeting held at the same place on 22 November 1927 attended by representatives of various provinces and princely states. De Mello travelled with Grant Govan to England to organise tours of India by South Africa in 1929 and MCC in 1930–31. Both tours were eventually cancelled but the BCCI was formally founded at the Roshanara Club in December 1928 with Grant Govan as its first president and De Mello as the secretary. They represented India in the Imperial Cricket Conference in May 1929.

De Mello, with Grant Govan, was also instrumental in founding the Cricket Club of India (CCI). Delhi was planned as the headquarters and location of the ground for the club, but it was eventually set up in Bombay. Guha considers this as an attempt on the part of De Mello and Grant Govan to shift the headquarters of cricket in India from Bombay, but a book published by the CCI for the Golden Jubilee of the Brabourne Stadium attributes this to the unavailability of land in Delhi. De Mello played a prominent role in selecting the site and convincing Lord Brabourne, the Governor of Bombay, to allot the land for the stadium at a cheap rate.

=== BCCI President and Secretary ===
De Mello served as the Secretary of BCCI from 1928–29 to 1937-38 and President from 1946–47 to 1950–51. In the meeting of the cricket board in Simla in the summer of 1934, De Mello submitted the proposal for the national championship and a sketch of the proposed trophy which became the Ranji Trophy.

1950 National Games at Bombay: De Mello and Governor of Bombay (in garland)

De Mello courted controversy later in his career (in 1951; reviewing his time as the BCCI President, The Times of India called him a 'dictator'). His tenure as the President of BCCI ended with a defeat to J. C. Mukherjee, the President of the Cricket Association of Bengal, by 12 votes to 5, in the Board meeting held at the Imperial Hotel in Delhi on 1951-08-05. He had not been on good terms with the Bengal association for some time. When in 1949, De Mello came up with serious allegations against the Indian captain Lala Amarnath, the 'Bengal lobby' had strongly supported Amarnath. Amarnath threatened to sue the board for one lakh rupees but the matter was then settled with Amarnath tendering a qualified apology to the board. In 1952, De Mello sought the presidency once again, but he opted to withdraw when he realized that his chances of winning were slim.

=== Cricketer ===
De Mello's cricket career as a medium pace bowler was rather inconspicuous. Duleepsinhji once dismissed him as one 'who thinks he is a bowler but has never found anyone to agree with him on that point.' His greatest success as a bowler came for a Rest of India team against the Vizzy XI in 1930-31 where took the wickets of Jack Hobbs, Herbert Sutcliffe and C. K. Nayudu. De Mello captained the first "Rest" team in the Bombay Pentangular.

=== Organizer ===
In 1948, De Mello became the founder-president of the Asian Cricket Conference. He was the president of the Table Tennis Federation of India and a founder of the Table Tennis Federation of Asia. In 1949, he launched the National Sports Club of India, and was an organizer of the 1952 World Table Tennis Championships in Bombay. He was also President of the Bombay Provincial Olympic Association and a key organiser for the 1950 National Games at Bombay.

De Mello was the Organising Committee chair for the first Asian Games at Delhi in 1951. As the General Manager of the Gwalior and Northern India Transport System, he helped to modernise Delhi's transport system. He also headed the Jumna Valley Rail and Road Transport Company.

=== Death ===
De Mello died following a cancer operation. He was buried in York Cemetery in New Delhi. He authored the book Portrait of Indian Sport which was published in 1959.

=== Legacy ===
The winner of the England-India Test cricket series held in India is awarded the Anthony de Mello Trophy named after him. The trophy was instituted in 1951, when England toured India for a five-match series.
