= Mirzapur, Mohali =

Mirzapur
- Village
- Location in Punjab, India Mirzapur (India)
- Coordinates: 30°53′58″N 76°42′35″E
- Country: India
- State: Punjab
- District: Mohali

Languages
  - Official: Punjabi
- Time zone: UTC+5:30 (IST)
- Vidhan Sabha constituency: Kurali

Mirzapur is a village of Kharar, tehsil near Kurali Mohali district, Punjab, India. It is located on the North of Chandigarh, adjacent to Mullanpur- Garibdas.

== Gallery ==
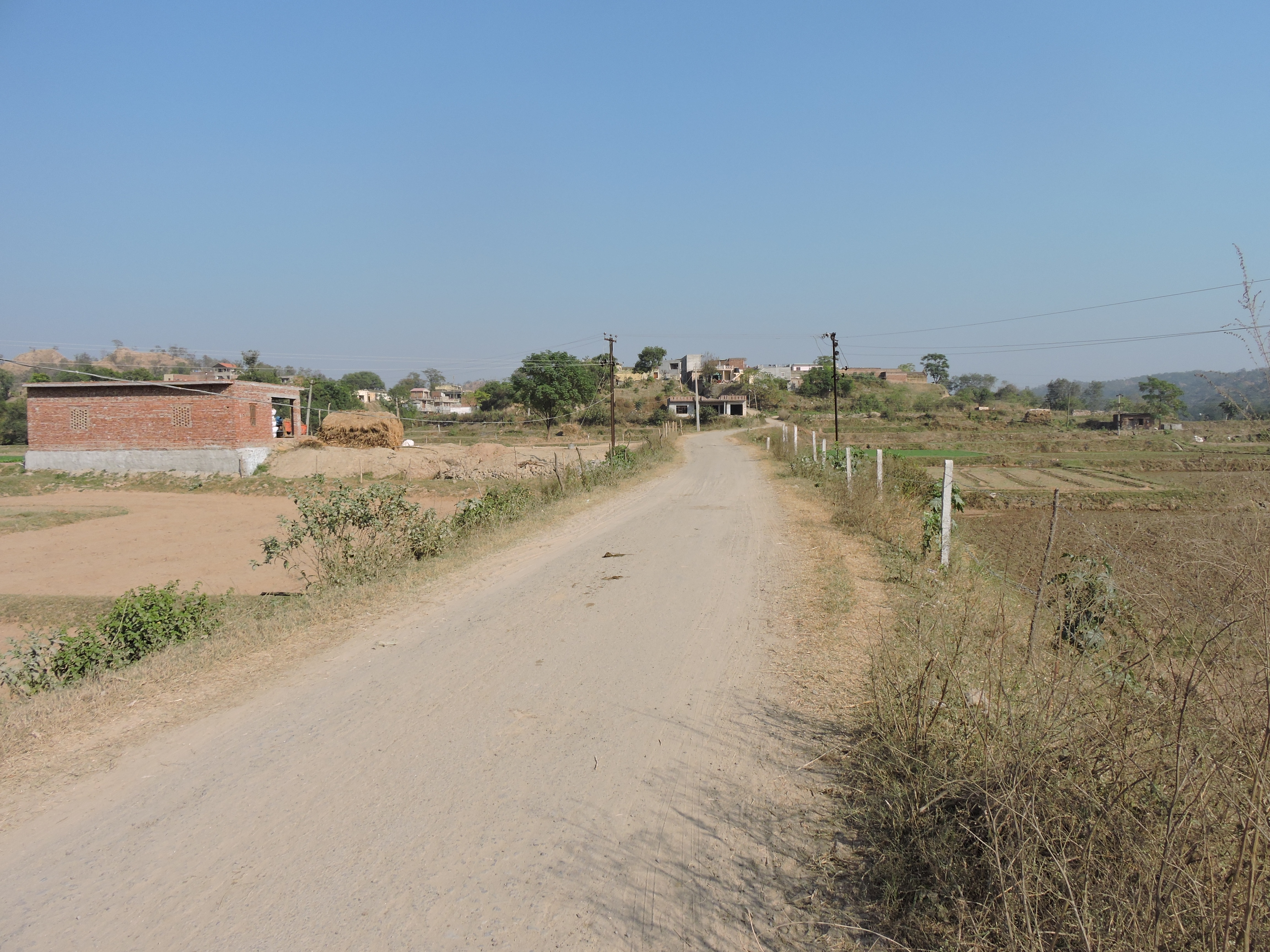
Mirzapur village, 22 Nov 2015

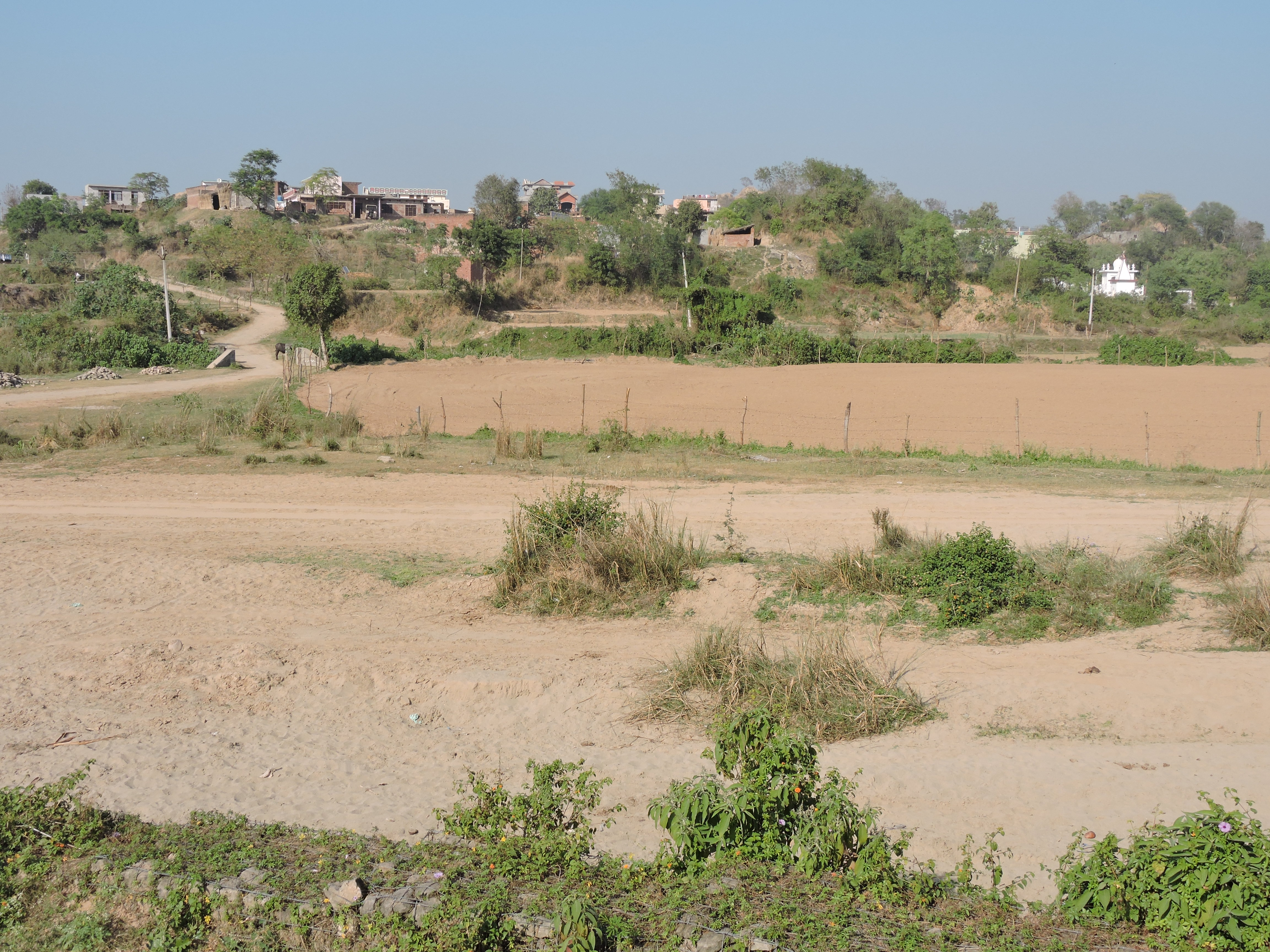
Side view of Mirzapur village

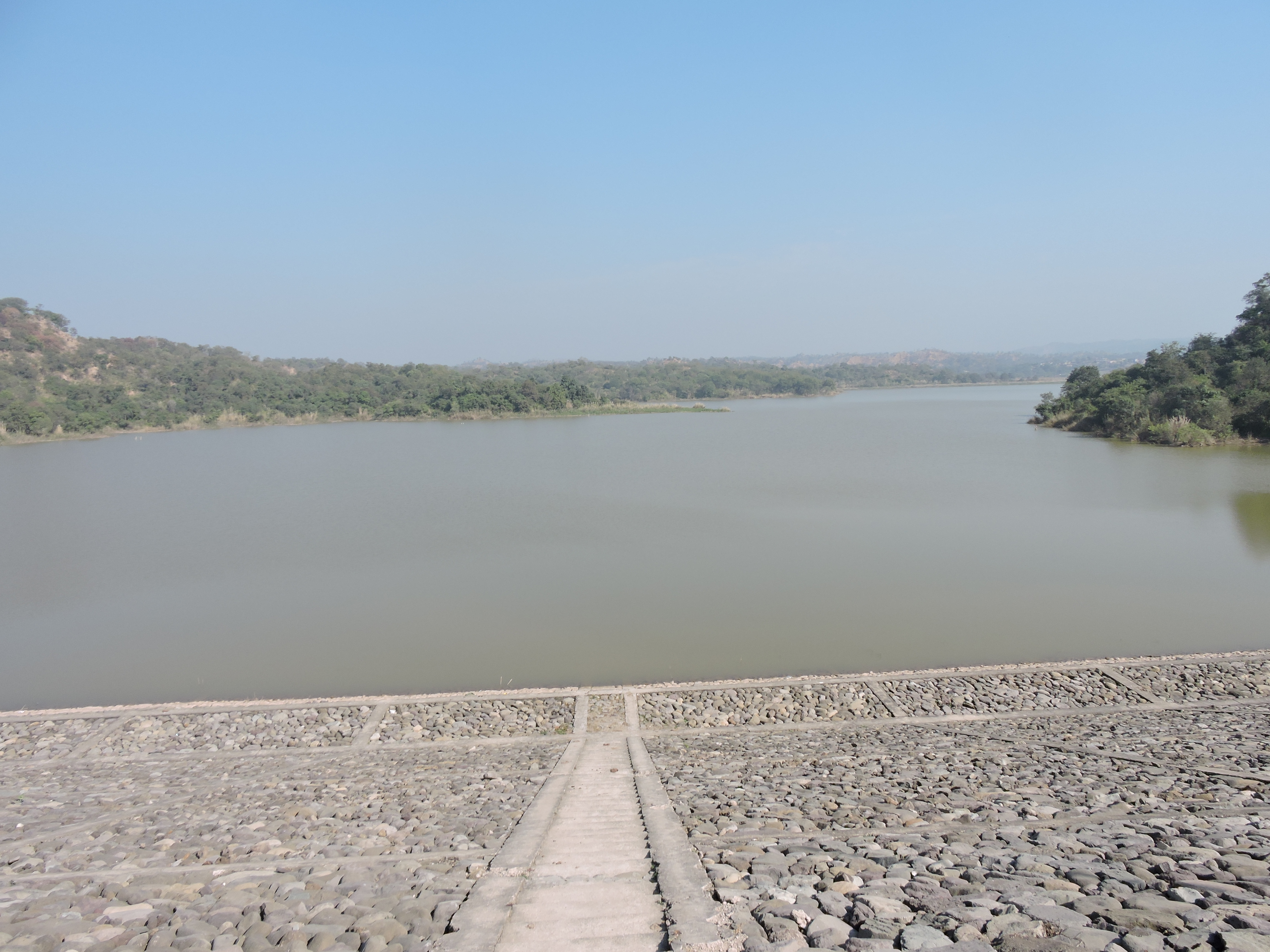
Migratory birds at Mirzapur dam

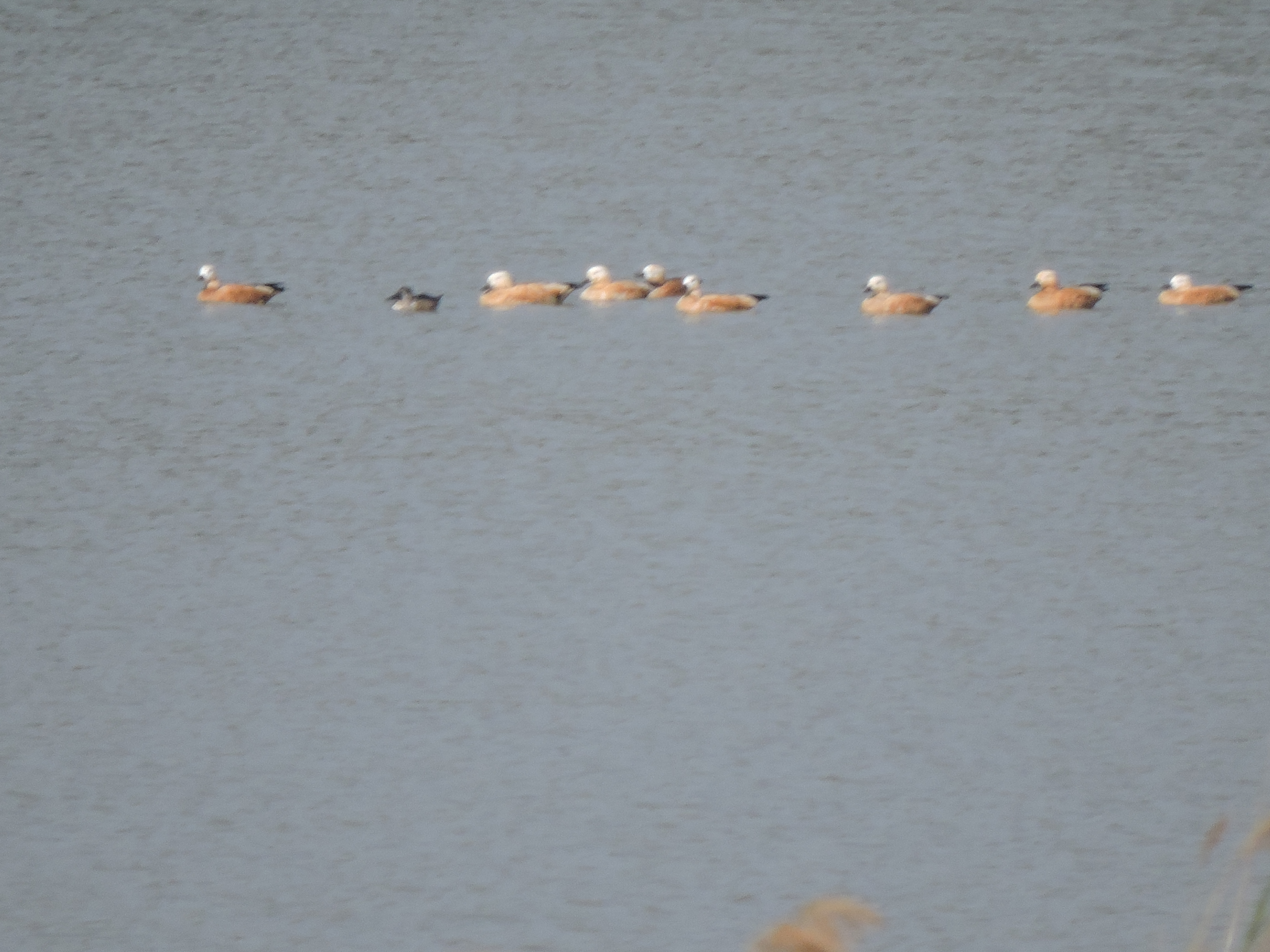
Migratory birds at Mirzapur dam
