= I. S. Bindra Stadium =

Cricket ground

Coordinates: 30°41′27.09″N 76°44′14.13″E

- PCA Stadium; PCA IS Bindra Stadium; Mohali Stadium
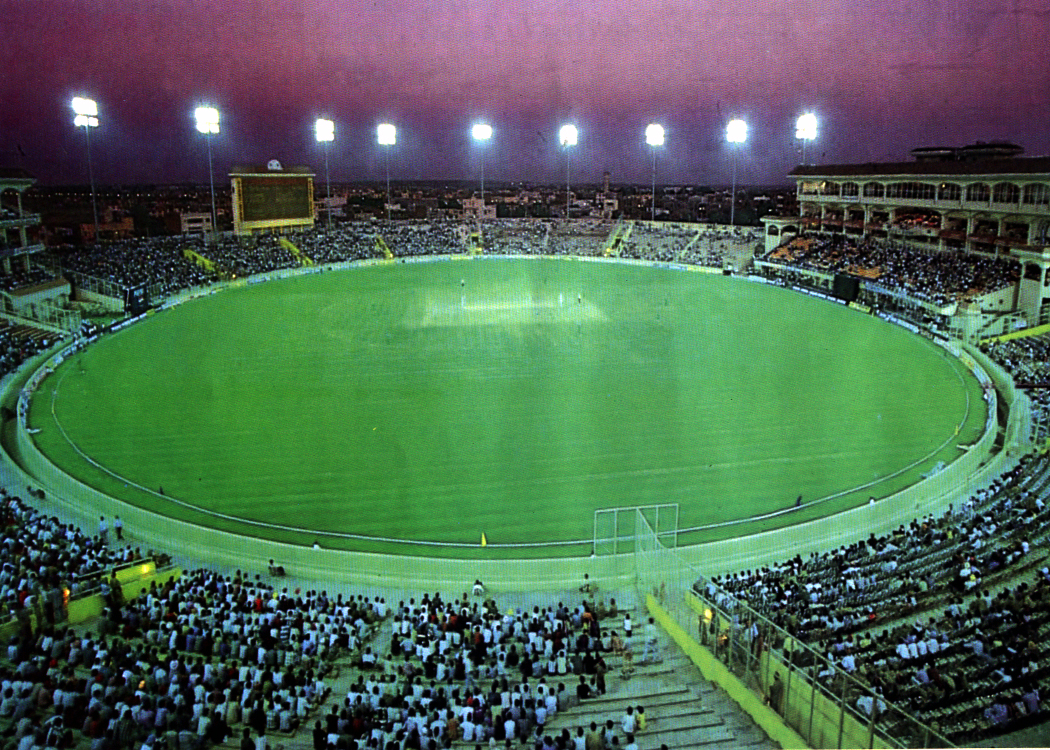
- The IS Bindra Stadium under floodlights
- Interactive map of I. S. Bindra Stadium
- Address: India
- Location: Mohali, Punjab, India
- Owner: Punjab Cricket Association
- Capacity: 26,950

Ground information
- Establishment: 1993
- Tenants: Indian cricket team (1993–present); Punjab cricket team (1993–present); Punjab Kings (2008–2023)
- End names
- Yuvraj Singh End; Harbhajan Singh End

International information
- First men's Test: 10–14 December 1994: India v West Indies
- Last men's Test: 4–6 March 2022: India v Sri Lanka
- First men's ODI: 22 November 1993: India v West Indies
- Last men's ODI: 22 September 2023: India v Australia
- First men's T20I: 12 December 2009: India v Sri Lanka
- Last men's T20I: 11 January 2024: India v Afghanistan
- Only women's ODI: 21 December 1997: England v Sri Lanka
- First women's T20I: 18 March 2016: Ireland v New Zealand
- Last women's T20I: 27 March 2016: India v West Indies
- As of 11 January 2024; Source: I.S. Bindra Punjab Cricket Association Stadium

The I. S. Bindra Punjab Cricket Stadium is a cricket ground located in Mohali, Punjab, India. It is commonly referred to as the Mohali Stadium. The stadium has an official capacity of 26,950 spectators. It remains a primary home venue for the Punjab domestic cricket team, alongside the newer Maharaja Yadavindra Singh International Cricket Stadium in Mullanpur. However, the IPL franchise Punjab Kings has permanently moved its primary home games to the Mullanpur Stadium In 2024 As On May 3, 2023, where the Mumbai Indians defeated the Punjab Kings by 6 wickets was last Indian Premier League match played, while continuing to utilize the HPCA Stadium in Dharamshala as its designated secondary home venue. spectators.

Formerly known as PCA Stadium, it was renamed after former BCCI and PCA president Inderjit Singh Bindra in 2015. As of December 2019, it has hosted 13 Tests, 25 ODIs and 5 T20Is.

== History ==
The stadium was designed by Arun Loomba and Associates. The construction of the stadium took around ₹250 million and 3 years to complete.

The stadium was inaugurated on 22 November 1993 with a One Day International match between India and South Africa during the 1993 Hero Cup.

The first Test match here was held the following season, between India and West Indies on 10 December 1994. One of the most famous one-day matches on this ground was a thrilling Cricket World Cup semi-final encounter between Australia and West Indies in February 1996. I. S. Bindra stadium hosted 3 matches of 2011 World Cup including the second semi-final match between India and Pakistan on 30 March 2011, which India won. The match was attended by the Prime Ministers Manmohan Singh of India and Yousaf Raza Gillani of Pakistan, owing to its crucial nature, and as a measure of cricket diplomacy for normalizing relations.

The first Test of the 2015 Freedom Trophy was played at the stadium, where spinners obtained considerable assistance from the pitch.

The first T20I at the ground was held in 2009, when India beat Sri Lanka by 6 wickets. It also hosted three matches of the 2016 ICC World Twenty20.

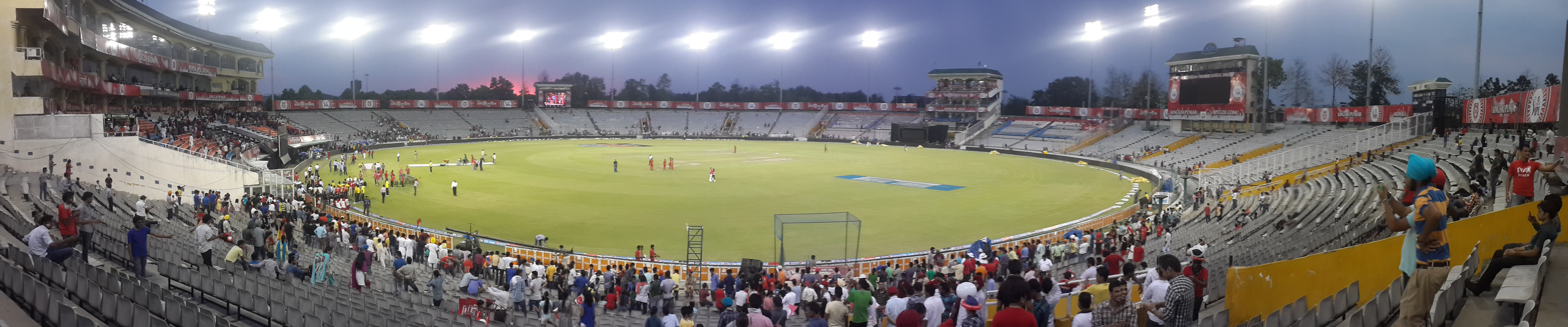
A panorama of the stadium.

== Pitch ==
The current pitch curator for the I. S. Bindra Stadium is Daljit Singh.

== Notable events ==
- Highest individual score in this ground 208* (153) scored by Rohit Sharma on 13 December 2017 in 2nd ODI against Sri Lanka.
- India qualified for the finals of the Men's 2011 Cricket World Cup beating Pakistan by 29 runs. The Man of the Match was Sachin Tendulkar for his innings of 85 runs.
- In the second test between England and India in March 2006, Anil Kumble took his 500th Test Match wicket.

== Cricket World Cup matches ==
The stadium has hosted four Cricket World Cup matches. The semi-final between Australia and West Indies of the 1996 World Cup was the first World Cup match held at the venue. It hosted three matches of the 2011 World Cup, including the semi-final between India and Pakistan. The stadium also hosted three T20 matches during the 2016 ICC World Twenty20.

=== 1996 Cricket World Cup semi-final ===
14 March
Scorecard

Australia; 207/8 (50 overs)	v	West Indies; 202 (49.3 overs)
Stuart Law 72 (105); Curtly Ambrose 2/26 (10 overs)		Shivnarine Chanderpaul 80 (126); Shane Warne 4/36 (9 overs)

Australia won by 5 runs
I. S. Bindra Stadium, Mohali
Umpires: B. C. Cooray and Srinivasaraghavan Venkataraghavan
Player of the match: Shane Warne (Aus)

=== 2011 Cricket World Cup ===
3 March 2011
09:30
Scorecard

South Africa; 351/5 (50 overs)	v	Netherlands; 120 (34.5 overs)
AB de Villiers 134 (98); Ryan ten Doeschate 3/72 (10 overs)		Wesley Barresi 44 (66); Imran Tahir 3/19 (6.5 overs)

South Africa won by 231 runs
I. S. Bindra Stadium, Mohali
Umpires: Asoka de Silva (SL) and Richard Kettleborough (Eng)
Player of the match: AB de Villiers (SA)

- Netherlands won the toss and elected to field.

11 March 2011
09:30
Scorecard

West Indies; 275 (50 overs)	v	Ireland; 231 (49 overs)
Devon Smith 107 (133); Kevin O'Brien 4/71 (9 overs)		Ed Joyce 84 (106); Sulieman Benn 4/53 (10 overs)

West Indies won by 44 runs
I. S. Bindra Stadium, Mohali
Umpires: Asoka de Silva (SL) and Shavir Tarapore (Ind)
Player of the match: Kieron Pollard (WI)

- Ireland won the toss and elected to field.

==== 2011 Cricket World Cup semi-final ====
30 March 2011
14:30 (D/N)
Scorecard

India; 260/9 (50 overs)	v	Pakistan; 231 (49.5 overs)
Sachin Tendulkar 85 (115); Wahab Riaz 5/46 (10 overs)		Misbah-ul-Haq 56 (76); Ashish Nehra 2/33 (10 overs)

India won by 29 runs
I. S. Bindra Stadium, Mohali
Umpires: Ian Gould (Eng) and Simon Taufel (Aus)
Player of the match: Sachin Tendulkar (Ind)

- India won the toss and elected to bat

=== 2016 World Twenty20 ===
22 March
19:30 (D/N)
Scorecard

New Zealand; 180/5 (20 overs)	v	Pakistan; 158/5 (20 overs)
Martin Guptill 80 (48); Mohammad Sami 2/23 (4 overs)		Sharjeel Khan 47 (25); Adam Milne 2/25 (4 overs)

New Zealand won by 22 runs
I. S. Bindra Stadium, Mohali
Umpires: Richard Illingworth (Eng) and Nigel Llong (Eng)
Player of the match: Martin Guptill (NZ)

- New Zealand won the toss and elected to bat.

25 March
15:00 (D/N)
Scorecard

Australia; 193/4 (20 overs)	v	Pakistan; 172/8 (20 overs)
Steve Smith 61* (43); Imad Wasim 2/31 (4 overs)		Khalid Latif 46 (41); James Faulkner 5/28 (4 overs)

Australia won by 21 runs
I. S. Bindra Stadium, Mohali
Umpires: Kumar Dharmasena (SL) and Marais Erasmus (SA)
Player of the match: James Faulkner (Aus)

- Australia won the toss and elected to bat.

27 March
19:30 (D/N)
Scorecard

Australia; 160/6 (20 overs)	v	India; 161/4 (19.1 overs)
Aaron Finch 43 (34); Hardik Pandya 2/36 (4 overs)		Virat Kohli 82* (51); Shane Watson 2/23 (4 overs)

India won by 6 wickets
I. S. Bindra Stadium, Mohali
Umpires: Kumar Dharmasena (SL) and Marais Erasmus (SA)
Player of the match: Virat Kohli (Ind)

- Australia won the toss and elected to bat.

== Records ==
=== Test records ===
- Highest Test Total: 630/6d – New Zealand vs. India, 16 October 2003
- Highest Individual Test Score: 187 – Shikhar Dhawan, India vs. Australia, 14 March 2013
- Best Test Innings Bowling Figures: 6/27 – Dion Nash, New Zealand vs. India, 10 October 1999
- Highest Test Partnership: 314 (for the 2nd wicket) – Rahul Dravid & Gautam Gambhir, India vs. England, 19 December 2008
- Sachin Tendulkar (767 runs) has scored the most Test runs, followed by Rahul Dravid (735) and Virender Sehwag (645).
- Anil Kumble (36 wickets) has taken the most wickets, followed by Ravindra Jadeja (27) and Harbhajan Singh (24).

=== ODI records ===
- Highest ODI Total: 393/3 – India vs. Sri Lanka, 13 December 2017
- Highest Individual ODI Score: 208 – Rohit Sharma, India vs Sri Lanka, 13 December 2017
- Best ODI Innings Bowling Figures: 5/21 – Makhaya Ntini, South Africa vs. Pakistan, 2006 ICC Champions Trophy, 27 October 2006
- Highest ODI Partnership: 221 (for the 3rd wicket) – Hashim Amla & AB De Villiers, South Africa vs. Netherlands, 2011 Cricket World Cup, 3 March 2011
- Rohit Sharma (410 runs) has scored the most ODI runs, followed by Sachin Tendulkar (366) and MS Dhoni (363).
- Harbhajan Singh (11 wickets) has taken the most wickets, followed by Glenn McGrath (8), Jasprit Bumrah (8) and Saqlain Mushtaq (8).

=== Twenty20 International records ===
- Highest Twenty20 Total: 211/4 – India vs. Sri Lanka, 12 December 2009
- Highest Individual Twenty20 Score: 82* – Virat Kohli, India vs. Australia, 2016 ICC World Twenty20, 27 March 2016
- Best Twenty20 Innings Bowling Figures: 5/27 – James Faulkner, Australia vs. Pakistan, 2016 ICC World Twenty20, 25 March 2016
- Highest Twenty20 Partnership: 81 (for the 2nd wicket) – Sanath Jayasuriya & Kumar Sangakkara, Sri Lanka vs. India, 12 December 2009
- Virat Kohli (154 runs) has scored the most runs, followed by and Smith Smith (98) and Yuvraj Singh (81).
- James Faulkner (6 wickets) has taken the most wickets, followed by Axar Patel (5) and Yuvraj Singh (4).

=== IPL records ===
- Highest Total: 240/5 – Chennai Super Kings vs. Kings XI Punjab, 19 April 2008
- Highest Individual Score: 120* – Paul Valthaty, Kings XI Punjab vs. Chennai Super Kings, 13 April 2011
- Best Bowling Figures: 5/21 – Munaf Patel, Mumbai Indians vs. Kings XI Punjab, 10 May 2011

== See also ==
- List of stadiums in India
- Maharaja Yadavindra Singh International Cricket Stadium
- List of cricket grounds by capacity
