= Mithun Manhas =

Indian first-class cricketer (born 1977)

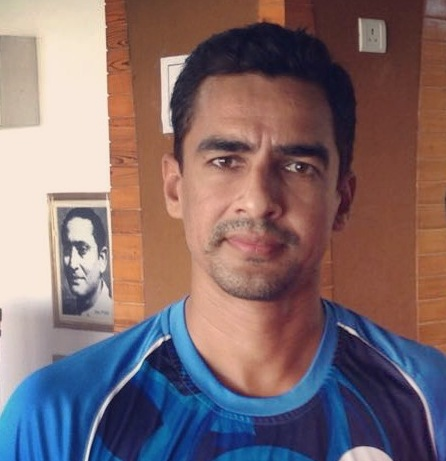
- Manhas in 2022

37th President of the Board of Control for Cricket in India
- Incumbent
- Assumed office 28 September 2025
- Preceded by: Roger Binny

Personal details
- Born: 12 September 1977 (age 49) Bhalessa, Jammu and Kashmir, India
- Cricket career

Cricket information
- Batting: Right-handed
- Bowling: Right-arm off-break
- Role: All-rounder, occasional wicket-keeper

Domestic team information
- Years: Team
- 1998–2015: Delhi
- 2008–2010: Delhi Daredevils
- 2011–2013: Pune Warriors India
- 2014–2015: Chennai Super Kings
- 2015–2017: Jammu and Kashmir

Career statistics
Competition	FC	LA	T20
Matches	157	130	91
Runs scored	9,714	4,126	1,170
Batting average	45.82	45.84	21.66
100s/50s	27/49	5/26	0/1
Top score	205*	148	52
Balls bowled	3,702	1,066	110
Wickets	40	25	5
Bowling average	46.65	35.12	29.60
5 wickets in innings	0	0	0
10 wickets in match	0	0	0
Best bowling	3/15	3/36	3/33
Catches/stumpings	105/1	53/–	28/–
- Source: ESPNcricinfo

Mithun Manhas (born 12 September 1977) is an Indian cricket administrator and former cricketer who is serving as the president of the Board of Control for Cricket in India since September 2025.

Previously, Manhas played first-class cricket for Delhi and Jammu and Kashmir. and later played in the Indian Premier League for Chennai Super Kings, Pune Warriors India, and Delhi Daredevils.

== Indian Premier League ==
Manhas played in the Indian Premier League representing the Delhi Daredevils. In the fourth season of IPL, he was contracted for US$260,000 by Pune Warriors. In the seventh season of the Indian Premier League, he was contracted by the Chennai Super Kings.

== Domestic career ==
Manhas was the captain of the Delhi side for most of the new millennium. He was at the helm when Delhi ended their championship drought in 2007–08, although Gambhir led the side in the semi-final and final. He scored 921 runs in that first-class season at 57.57.

In September 2015, Manhas joined Jammu and Kashmir cricket team for 2015–16 Ranji Trophy season.

== Coaching career ==
In February 2017, Manhas was appointed assistant coach of Indian Premier League side Kings XI Punjab.

In October 2017, Manhas was announced as the batting consultant of the Bangladesh Under-19 team. He was their batting consultant till 2019.

Manhas was hired by the Royal Challengers Bangalore as their assistant coach for the 2019 IPL.

In 2022, Manhas was appointed assistant coach of Indian Premier League side Gujarat Titans.

== President of BCCI ==
In September 2025, Manhas elected unopposed as Board of Control for Cricket in India (BCCI) president at the 94th annual general meeting of the board held on 28 September 2025.

== Controversies ==
The major controversies surrounding Manhas include Legal Summons in Defamation Complaint in 2025, fallout with player Parvez Rasool and the viral Virendra Sehwag Divorce Rumours.

In October 2025, a Jammu Court issued summons to Manhas and others in criminal defamation complaint filed by former Jammu and Kashmir Police officer Sudershan Mehta, who alleged that Manhas and others had published defamatory statements about him to damage his reputation.

During his tenure as Jammu & Kashmir Cricket Association (JKCA) Chairman in 2021, Manhas had issued notice to Indian cricketer Parvez Rasool, asking him to return a cricket roller allegedly taken by him. Rasool strongly denied this, saying that he was being victimised.

In early 2026, social media platforms and unverified online reports suddenly erupted with rumors of divorce between Virendra Sahwag and his wife Aarti Ahlawat, linking Manhas with the alleged impending divorce. Later the entire matter subsided by its own.
