= Inderjit Singh Bindra =

Indian cricket administrator (1941/1942–2026)

Inderjit Singh Bindra IAS (Retd.)

23rd President of BCCI
- In office 1993–1996
- Preceded by: Madhavrao Scindia
- Succeeded by: Raj Singh Dungarpur

Personal details
- Born: 1941 or 1942
- Died: 25 January 2026 (aged 84) New Delhi, India

Inderjit Singh Bindra (1941 or 1942 — 25 January 2026), also known as I. S. Bindra, was an Indian cricket administrator who was the president of the Board of Control for Cricket in India (BCCI) from 1993 to 1996.

== Life and career ==
Bindra served as the President of the Punjab Cricket Association (PCA) from 1978 to 2014. In 2015, he was elected as the Chairman of PCA.

He was elected the President of the BCCI in 1993 and held the post until 1996. Bindra, N. K. P. Salve and Jagmohan Dalmiya were responsible for getting the Cricket World Cup hosting rights to the Indian subcontinent in 1987 and 1996. Bindra also worked as the principal adviser of the International Cricket Council (ICC) when Sharad Pawar was its president.

Bindra was criticised by BCCI officials for supporting Lalit Modi during the match-fixing crisis, and for endorsing Haroon Lorgat for the role of the CEO of Cricket South Africa. He retired from cricket administration in 2014.

In 2015, the PCA Stadium in Mohali was renamed after Bindra as the "Punjab Cricket Association IS Bindra Stadium". He was also an adviser in the formation of the Indian Premier League (IPL) and was later the International Cricket Council’s (ICC) Principal Adviser.

Bindra died on 25 January 2026, at the age of 84.
