= Amitoze Singh =

Indian cricketer (born 1989)

Personal information
- Born: 14 February 1989 (age 37); Delhi, India
- Batting: Right-handed
- Bowling: Right-arm medium
- Role: All-rounder

Domestic team information
- Years: Team
- 2010/11–2014/15: Punjab
- 2016/17: Saurashtra

Career statistics
Competition	FC	LA	T20
Matches	12	8	7
Runs scored	694	175	53
Batting average	40.82	25.00	17.66
100s/50s	1/7	0/2	0/0
Top score	103	76*	21
Balls bowled	955	186	60
Wickets	11	3	2
Bowling average	41.18	37.33	30.00
5 wickets in innings	0	0	0
10 wickets in match	0	0	0
Best bowling	3/33	1/13	1/6
Catches/stumpings	7/–	4/–	3/–
- Source: ESPNcricinfo, 20 December 2012

Amitoze Singh (born 14 February 1989) is an Indian cricketer who plays first-class cricket for Punjab. Amitoze is a right-hand batsman and right-arm medium pace bowler. He was one of the domestic signings of Mumbai Indians in 2012. In June 2021, he was selected to take part in the Minor League Cricket tournament in the United States following the players' draft.
