= List of presidents of the Board of Control for Cricket in India =

President of Board of Control for Cricket in India
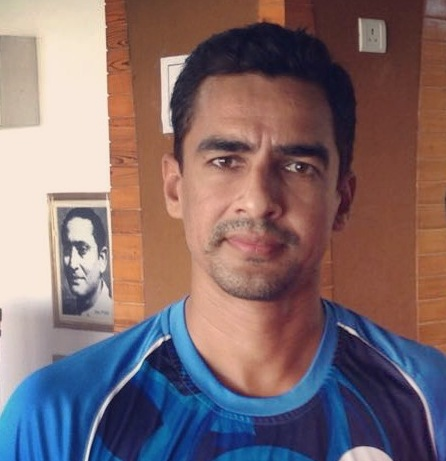
- Incumbent; Mithun Manhas since 28 September 2025
- Board of Control for Cricket in India
- Appointer: Full Members of the BCCI
- Term length: 3 Years
- Inaugural holder: R. E. Grant Govan
- Formation: 1928 (98 years ago)
- Salary: ₹5 crore (US$520,000)
- Website: https://www.bcci.tv

The president of the Board of Control for Cricket in India is the highest post at the Board of Control for Cricket in India (BCCI), which administers cricket in India. Though the post is an honorary one, it is considered a highly prestigious post due to popularity of the game in the India and the financial clout of the organisation. Over the years influential politicians, royalty and businessmen have occupied the post of president. The president is elected at the BCCI's Annual General Meeting by the member associations of the BCCI with the outgoing president also getting a vote as the chairman of the meeting. The post is rotated zone-wise amongst the five zones of BCCI and a person can hold the post of BCCI president for a maximum of three years.

In case of a vacancy, as per the Supreme Court of India, the most senior BCCI vice-president and the joint secretary would take over the interim roles of president and secretary respectively till fresh elections are held. In its report in January 2016, the three-member Lodha Committee recommended the creation of the post of the CEO, with panel stressing the need for the BCCI to separate its governance and management duties, with the CEO taking charge of the management side and also made recommendations for a clear segregation of operational duties from the governance and policy-makers in the board. In April 2016, Rahul Johri was appointed first ever chief executive officer of BCCI.

== List of Presidents ==
List of presidents of Board of Control for Cricket in India
No.	Image	President	Term	Honorary Secretary	Term
1		R. E. Grant Govan	1928–33	Anthony de Mello^{[β]}	1928–38
2		Sikandar Hayat Khan	1933–35	Anthony de Mello^{[β]}	1928–38
3		Hamidullah Khan	1935–37	Anthony de Mello^{[β]}	1928–38
4		K. S. Digvijaysinhji	1937–38	Anthony de Mello^{[β]}	1928–38
5		P. Subbarayan	1938–46	K. S. Ranga Rao	1938–46
6		Anthony de Mello	1946–51	Pankaj Gupta	1946–48
6		Anthony de Mello	1946–51	M. G. Bhave	1948–51
7		J. C. Mukherji	1951–54	A. N. Ghose^{[β]}	1951–60
8		Maharajkumar of Vizianagram	1954–56	A. N. Ghose^{[β]}	1951–60
9		Surjit Singh Majithia	1956–58	A. N. Ghose^{[β]}	1951–60
10		R. K. Patel	1958–60	A. N. Ghose^{[β]}	1951–60
11		M. A. Chidambaram	1960–63	M. Chinnaswamy^{[β]}	1960–65
12		Fatehsinghrao Gaekwad	1963–66	M. Chinnaswamy^{[β]}	1960–65
		Fatehsinghrao Gaekwad	1963–66	S. Sriraman^{[β]}	1965–70
13		Zal Irani	1966–69	S. Sriraman^{[β]}	1965–70
14		A. N. Ghose	1969–72	S. Sriraman^{[β]}	1965–70
		A. N. Ghose	1969–72	M. V. Chandgadkar	1970–75
15		Purshottam M. Rungta	1972–75	M. V. Chandgadkar	1970–75
16		Ramprakash Mehra	1975–77	Ghulam Ahmed	1975–80
17		M. Chinnaswamy	1977–80	Ghulam Ahmed	1975–80
18		S. K. Wankhede	1980–82	A.W. Kanmadikar	1980–85
19		N. K. P. Salve	1982–85	A.W. Kanmadikar	1980–85
20		S. Sriraman	1985–88	Ranbir Singh Mahendra^{[β]}	1985–90
21		Biswanath Dutt	1988–90	Ranbir Singh Mahendra^{[β]}	1985–90
22		Madhavrao Scindia	1990–93	Jagmohan Dalmiya^{[β]}	1990–91^{[RES]}
22		Madhavrao Scindia	1990–93	C. Nagaraj	1991–93
23		I. S. Bindra	1993–96	Jagmohan Dalmiya^{[β]}	1993–97
24		Raj Singh Dungarpur	1996–99	Jagmohan Dalmiya^{[β]}	1993–97
24		Raj Singh Dungarpur	1996–99	Jaywant Y. Lele	1997–99
25		A. C. Muthiah	1999–2001	Niranjan S. Shah	1999–2003
26		Jagmohan Dalmiya	2001–04	Niranjan S. Shah	1999–2003
26		Jagmohan Dalmiya	2001–04	S. K. Nair	2003–04
27		Ranbir Singh Mahendra	2004–05	Niranjan S. Shah	2004–08
28		Sharad Pawar	2005–08	Niranjan S. Shah	2004–08
29		Shashank Manohar	2008–11	N. Srinivasan^{[β]}	2008–11
30		N. Srinivasan	2011–13^{[RES]}	Sanjay Jagdale	2011–13
(26)		Jagmohan Dalmiya (Interim)	2013	Sanjay Patel	2013–15
(30)		N. Srinivasan	2013–14^{[§]}	Sanjay Patel	2013–15
31		Shivlal Yadav (Interim)	2014	Sanjay Patel	2013–15
32		Sunil Gavaskar (Interim)	2014	Sanjay Patel	2013–15
(26)		Jagmohan Dalmiya	2015^{[†]}	Sanjay Patel	2013–15
(29)		Shashank Manohar^{[RES]}	2015–16	Anurag Thakur^{[β]}	2015–16
33		Anurag Thakur	2016–17^{[§]}	Ajay Shirke	2016–17^{[§]}
34		C. K. Khanna (Interim)	2017–19	Amitabh Choudhary	2017–19
35		Sourav Ganguly	2019–22	Jay Shah	2019–24
36		Roger Binny	2022–25	Jay Shah	2019–24
36		Roger Binny	2022–25	Devajit Saikia (Acting)	2024–25
36		Roger Binny	2022–25	Devajit Saikia	2025–Incumbent
37		Mithun Manhas	2025–Incumbent	Devajit Saikia	2025–Incumbent

Key

- ^{†} Died in office
- ^{§} Sacked or removed from office
- ^{RES} Resigned
- ^{β} Later become President
