= Dinesh Nanavati =

Indian cricketer and coach

Personal information
- Full name: Dinesh P. Nanavati
- Born: 1948 or 1949 (age 77–78); Porbandar, Gujarat, India
- Nickname: Nana
- Role: Wicket-keeper

Domestic team information
- Years: Team
- 1977/78–1983/84: Saurashtra

Career statistics
Competition	FC
Matches	32
Runs scored	1,562
Batting average	31.24
100s/50s	0/13
Top score	88
Balls bowled	–
Wickets	–
Bowling average	–
5 wickets in innings	–
10 wickets in match	–
Best bowling	–
Catches/stumpings	59/8
- Source: ESPNcricinfo, 18 March 2016

Dinesh Nanavati (born 1948–1949) is an Indian former first-class cricketer who represented Saurashtra. He later worked as a cricket coach.

== Life and career ==
Nanavati played as a wicket-keeper for Saurashtra between 1977/78 and 1983/84 seasons. He appeared in 32 first-class matches, which included a few for West Zone from 1978/79 to 1981/82. He made more than 1500 first-class runs and effected over 50 dismissals.

Nanavati became a cricket coach after his playing career. He worked for many years at the National Cricket Academy (NCA) as West Zone chief coach, wicket-keeping coach and batting coach. Having previously coached the Mumbai under-19 team, he was appointed head coach of Assam in 2004. He had passed the BCCI Level 3 coaching programme earlier the same year. He resigned from his coaching role at the NCA in 2013, citing health reasons. He also conducted coaching camps in North America.
