= National Cricket Academy =

Cricket training academy of the BCCI

- Abbreviation: NCA
- Founded: 2000; 26 years ago
- Founder: Raj Singh Dungarpur
- Type: Cricket academy
- Legal status: Foundation
- Purpose: Player development
- Location: Bengaluru, India
- Services: Training, guidance, rehabilitation
- Director: VVS Laxman
- Parent organization: BCCI

The National Cricket Academy (NCA) is the premier cricket facility of the Board of Control for Cricket in India (BCCI) established in May 2000 for the purpose of developing young cricketers who have been identified as having the potential to represent the Indian cricket team. The facility is also used for the rehabilitation of injured players, including many international players.

The original academy was established in 2000 and is located near the M. Chinnaswamy Stadium. In September 2024, the BCCI opened a revamped, state-of-the-art facility near the Bengaluru International Airport. This new Centre of Excellence (CoE) takes over as the BCCI's primary training academy and site for rehabilitation, injury management and sports science. Operations from the old facility have been shifted out in a phased manner to the new CoE, with VVS Laxman, the director of the former NCA, carrying on as director for the CoE. Notably, the BCCI has extended use of the facility to non-cricketers such as Olympic athletes.

== History ==
The NCA was the brainchild of cricket administrator and former BCCI President Raj Singh Dungarpur.

The NCA's early trainees benefited from the Border–Gavaskar Scholarship Program, an initiative funded by the Australia-India Council (AIC) that sent promising young Indian cricketers to train at the Commonwealth Bank Cricket Academy in Adelaide, Australia. Named after former captains Allan Border and Sunil Gavaskar, the program began in 2000 and selected its scholars, drawn from the NCA and other state and domestic level academies, through a panel chaired by Gavaskar. Recipients included Mohammad Kaif, Sridaran Sriram, and Shiv Sunder Das in its first year, followed by players such as Parthiv Patel, Deepak Chougule, and Cheteshwar Pujara in subsequent years. The BCCI contributed additional funding in some years to extend players' training stays. The program was discontinued around 2011 after the AIC withdrew its sponsorship and no other body stepped in to fund it.

In 2000, Sunil Gavaskar argued that the NCA team should not have played the visiting Zimbabwe team, saying "I thought it was unfair on the performers who were not given a chance to play first class matches against touring sides". In response, NCA chair Raj Singh Dungarpur said, "Such people should either resign from the committee, or take it on, or fall in line." Gavaskar resigned as NCA committee member thereon.

In 2014, BCCI collaborated with Cricket Australia (CA) and the England and Wales Cricket Board (ECB) to get expert opinion on the creation of its new structure. The NCA also signed a 5 year agreement with the MRF Pace Foundation to send fast bowlers to Chennai for training.

In 2023, the NCA was under scrutiny with former India head coach Ravi Shastri criticizing the workload management and injury prevention of national team players, claiming that "some have become permanent residents of the NCA".

On 16 February 2022, BCCI president Sourav Ganguly and secretary Jay Shah announced the construction of a new NCA facility. Plans included three cricket grounds, a gymnasium, 40 practice pitches, a swimming pool and rooms for upcoming players. The new campus became fully operational in 2025, and is now known as the BCCI Centre of Excellence.

== Administration ==
Season	Chair	Director	Coaches
2000	Raj Singh Dungarpur	Vasu Paranjpe, Roger Binny	
2001	Sunil Gavaskar	Brijesh Patel	Balwinder Sandhu (Chief Coach), K Jayantilal, Roger Binny
2002	Sunil Gavaskar	Brijesh Patel	Bittu
2003	Sunil Gavaskar	Brijesh Patel	Chandrakant Pandit, Venkatesh Prasad, Rajesh Kamath, Vaibhav Daga (Physio)
2004	Sunil Gavaskar	Brijesh Patel	
2005	Sunil Gavaskar	Shivlal Yadav	Dinesh Nanavaty, Venkatesh Prasad, Raghuram Bhat, Sanath Kumar, S. Basu
2006	Kapil Dev	Shivlal Yadav	
2007	Ravi Shastri		
2008–2010		Dav Whatmore	
2010–2012	Anil Kumble	Sandeep Patil	
2014–2019	Anil Kumble	Brijesh Patel	Dr. Kinjal Suratwala (Head, Sports Science & Coach Education), Bharat Arun (Head, Bowling Unit), Dinesh Nanavaty (Head, Batting Unit), V Venkataram (Bowling Coach), R Sridhar (Fielding Coach)
2019–2021		Rahul Dravid	
2021		VVS Laxman	
