= Indian National Airways =

Indian airline, 1933–1953

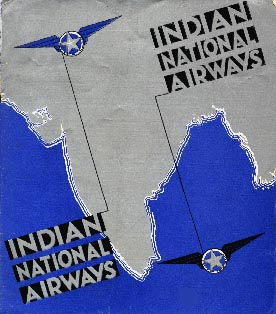
Time Table cover of Indian National Airways c. 1933

Indian National Airways Ltd was an airline based in Delhi, India. The founder of the airline was R. E. Grant Govan, a Delhi based British industrialist who also co-founded the Board of Control for Cricket in India and the Cricket Club of India. The airline was formed on the basis of a government airmail contract.

== History ==
The company was started by Govan Bros Ltd. in May 1933 (93 years ago) with a capital of Rs. 3 million. It became the second airline to start operations in India in December 1933, with weekly passenger and freight services from Calcutta to Rangoon and Dhaka. It also started a weekly service between Karachi and Lahore, a feeder service for Imperial Airways. The company then had a fleet made up of light single-engined aircraft. By 1937 the airline had clocked over a million miles and made a slender annual profit.

The airline was awarded another government contract in 1938 under the Empire Air Mail Scheme for carrying first class mail on the Karachi - Lahore and Karachi - Colombo routes for a period of ten years along with Tata Airlines. This was a major boost for aviation in India. As this contract promised a minimum income along with an operating subsidy, the company was able to expand and renovate its fleet. During World War II, all mail contracts were suspended and aircraft put under government disposal. Only spare capacity was allowed for commercial use, which affected the industry on the whole.

It was one of the four major airlines in India at the time of Indian Independence in 1947. Govan Bros Ltd. and all its businesses, including Indian National Airways Ltd, was sold to the Ramkrishna Dalmia led Dalmia Group on 4 July 1946. As of 1947, the airline had a fleet of six Vickers Vikings with another nine De Havilland Doves on order. The company also bought some war-surplus Douglas DC-3 aircraft from the United States of America at the end of the war. In 1953 (73 years ago), Indian National Airways was nationalised and merged into Indian Airlines.
