= Punjab cricket team (India) =

Indian cricket team

Personnel
- Captain: Uday Saharan (FC); Abhishek Sharma (LA & T20)
- Coach: Vacant
- Owner: Punjab Cricket Association

Team information
- Founded: 1890
- Home ground: Inderjit Singh Bindra Stadium, Mohali; Maharaja Yadavindra Singh International Cricket Stadium, Mullanpur, Mohali; Dhruve Pandove Stadium, Patiala; Gandhi Sports Complex Ground, Amritsar
- Capacity: 28,000

History
- First-class debut: Marylebone Cricket Club in 1926 at Lawrence Gardens, Lahore
- Ranji Trophy wins: 1
- Irani Trophy wins: 0
- Vijay Hazare Trophy wins: 0
- Syed Mushtaq Ali Trophy wins: 1
- Official website: PCA

The Punjab cricket team is a first-class cricket team that represents the Indian state of Punjab. They have qualified for only one Ranji Trophy semi-final in the last five seasons and made it to the final in the 2004–05 tournament, where they lost to Railways in the first innings. They also play in other domestic cricket tournaments in India. They have been winners of the Ranji Trophy only once, in the 1992–93 season. In 2023-24, they won their maiden Syed Mushtaq Ali Trophy.

== Competition history ==
In 1968-69, Punjab competed as a unified team for the first time. Before then, Southern Punjab, Eastern Punjab and Northern Punjab had competed at various times. Punjab has won the Ranji Trophy only once, in 1992–93. That year, they lost the Irani Trophy against a Rest of the Indian team that featured the likes of Rahul Dravid, and Sourav Ganguly. Ajay Jadeja and Nayan Mongia. The team has never won the one-day trophy.

== Honours ==
Southern Punjab

- Ranji Trophy
  - Runners-up (1): 1938–39

Punjab

- Ranji Trophy
  - Winners: 1992–93
  - Runners-up (2): 1994–95, 2004–05
- Vijay Hazare Trophy
  - Runners-up (2): 2002-03, 2014-15
- Syed Mushtaq Ali Trophy
  - Winners: 2023–24
  - Runners-up (4): 2006-07, 2011-12, 2012-13, 2014-15

== Home ground ==
The Punjab cricket team use several stadiums for home games. The Maharaja Yadavindra Singh International Cricket Stadium in Sahibzada Ajit Singh Nagar is regarded as the main venue for the Punjab cricket team. New cricket grounds of international recognition are expected to come up at Bathinda and one more at Ludhiana or Amritsar as per the saying of the Punjab government.

The international stadium and the proposed of Punjab cricket team:

- Inderjit Singh Bindra Stadium, Sahibzada Ajit Singh Nagar. It is a regular test venue for the BCCI and the home of the IPL team Kings XI Punjab.
- Gandhi Sports Complex Ground, Amritsar – hosted 2 ODI matches.
- Gandhi Stadium, Jalandhar – hosted a Test and 3 ODI.
- Dhruve Pandove Stadium, Patiala – the oldest ground in Punjab.
- Maharaja Yadavindra Singh International Cricket Stadium, Mullanpur, Sahibzada Ajit Singh Nagar.
- Shaheed Udham Singh Stadium, Amritsar – proposed in 2011.
- Bathinda International Cricket Stadium, a stadium presented by Bathinda, has been under construction since 2007.

== Current squad ==
Players with international caps are listed in bold.

Name	Birth date	Batting style	Bowling style	Notes
Batters
Anmolpreet Singh	28 March 1998 (age 28)	Right-handed	Right-arm off break	
Harnoor Pannu	30 January 2003 (age 23)	Left-handed	Right-arm leg break	Plays for **Punjab Kings** in IPL
Uday Saharan	8 September 2004 (age 22)	Right-handed	Right-arm off break	**First-class Captain**
Jashanpreet Sidhu	29 April 1999 (age 27)	Left-handed	Right-arm off break	
**Shubman Gill**	8 September 1999 (age 27)	Right-handed	Right-arm off break	Plays for **Gujarat Titans** in IPL
Vihaan Malhotra	1 January 2007 (age 19)	Left-handed	Right-arm off break	
All-rounders
**Naman Dhir**	31 December 1999 (age 26)	Right-handed	Right-arm off break	Plays for **Mumbai Indians** in IPL
Ramandeep Singh	13 April 1997 (age 29)	Right-handed	Right-arm medium	Plays for **Kolkata Knight Riders**in IPL
Krish Bhagat	6 November 2004 (age 22)	Right-handed	Right-arm medium	
Sanvir Singh	12 October 1996 (age 30)	Right-handed	Right-arm medium	
**Abhishek Sharma**	4 September 2000 (age 26)	Left-handed	Slow left-arm orthodox	**List A & Twenty20 Captain**; Plays for **Sunrisers Hyderabad** in IPL
Wicket-keepers
Prabhsimran Singh	10 August 2000 (age 26)	Right-handed		Plays for **Punjab Kings** in IPL
Salil Arora	7 November 2002 (age 24)	Right-handed		Plays for **Sunrisers Hyderabad** in IPL
Spin Bowlers
**Mayank Markande**	11 November 1997 (age 29)	Right-handed	Right-arm leg break	
Harpreet Brar	16 September 1995 (age 31)	Left-handed	Slow left-arm orthodox	Plays for **Punjab Kings** in IPL
Raghu Sharma	11 March 1993 (age 33)	Right-handed	Right-arm leg break	Plays for **Mumbai Indians** in IPL
Emanjot Chahal	17 August 2004 (age 22)	Right-handed	Slow left-arm orthodox	
Harjas Singh Tandon	6 February 2003 (age 23)	Right-handed	Right-arm off break	
Arjun Rajput	25 September 2007 (age 19)	Left-handed	Right-arm off break	
Pace Bowlers
**Gurnoor Brar**	25 May 2000 (age 26)	Left-handed	Right-arm medium-fast	Plays for **Gujarat Titans** in IPL
Sukhdeep Bajwa	11 November 2000 (age 26)	Right-handed	Right-arm medium	
Ashwani Kumar	29 August 2001 (age 25)	Left-handed	Left-arm medium-fast	Plays for **Mumbai Indians** in IPL
**Arshdeep Singh**	5 February 1999 (age 27)	Left-handed	Left-arm medium-fast	Plays for **Mumbai Indians** in IPL
**Umesh Yadav**	25 October 1987 (age 39)	Right-handed	Right-arm fast	
Sahil Bhaskar	30 August 2004 (age 22)	Right-handed	Right-arm medium	

Updated as on 16 November 2026

== Notable players ==
=== Players from Punjab who have played Test cricket for India, along with their year of Test debut ===
- Mohammad Jahangir Khan (1932)
- Lall Singh (1932)
- Mohammad Nissar (1932)
- Syed Nazir Ali (1932)
- Syed Wazir Ali (1932)
- Lala Amarnath (1933)
- Dilawar Hussain (1934)
- Yadavindra Singh (Maharaja of Patiala) (1934)
- Baqa Jilani (1936)
- Abdul Hafeez Kardar (1946)
- Iftikhar Ali Khan Pataudi (Nawab of Pataudi) (1946)
- Amir Elahi (1947)
- Kanwar Rai Singh (1948)
- Vijay Rajindernath (1952)
- Vijay Mehra (1955)
- Bishan Singh Bedi (1966)
- Mohinder Amarnath (1969)
- Surinder Amarnath (1976)
- Yashpal Sharma (1979)
- Yograj Singh (1981)
- Navjot Singh Sidhu (1983)
- Gursharan Singh (1990)
- Aashish Kapoor (1994)
- Vikram Rathour (1996)
- Harbhajan Singh (1998)
- Harvinder Singh (1998)
- Sarandeep Singh (2000)
- Yuvraj Singh (2003)
- Vikram Raj Vir Singh (2006)
- Shubman Gill (2020)

=== Players from Punjab who have played ODI but not Test cricket for India, along with their year of ODI debut ===
- Bhupinder Singh Sr (1994)
- Pankaj Dharmani (1996)
- Reetinder Singh Sodhi (2000)
- Dinesh Mongia (2001)
- Manpreet Gony (2008)
- Rahul Sharma (2011)
- Barinder Sran (2016)
- Gurkeerat Singh Mann (2016)
- Siddarth Kaul (2018)
- Arshdeep Singh (2022)
- Gurnoor Brar (2026)
- Naman Dhir (2026)

=== Players from Punjab who have played T20I but not ODI or Test cricket for India, along with their year of T20I debut ===
- Sandeep Sharma (2015)
- Mandeep Singh (2016)
- Mayank Markande (2019)
- Abhishek Sharma (2024)
- Ramandeep Singh (2025)

=== Notable players at the domestic level ===
- Dhruv Pandove
- Uday Kaul
- Anmolpreet Singh
- Prabhsimran Singh
- Nehal Wadhera
