= York Cemetery, New Delhi =

Cemetery in India

Coordinates: 28.5331362°N 77.3111392°E

York Cemetery or York Qabristan is an Anglo-Indian cemetery located in New Delhi, India.

== Notable interments ==
- Anthony de Mello, cricket administrator and one of the founders of the Board of Control for Cricket in India.
- K R Narayanan, President of India (1997 – 2002)
