= Raj Singh Dungarpur =

Indian cricketer (1935–2009)

Personal information
- Full name: Raj Singh Dungarpur
- Born: 19 December 1935; Dungarpur, Rajasthan, India
- Died: 12 September 2009 (aged 73); Mumbai, Maharashtra, India
- Height: 5 ft 9 in (175 cm)
- Batting: Right-handed
- Bowling: Right-arm medium

Domestic team information
- Years: Team
- 1955–56: Madhya Bharat
- 1956–57 to 1970–71: Rajasthan
- 1960–61 to 1967–68: Central Zone

Career statistics
Competition	First-class
Matches	86
Runs scored	1292
Batting average	15.20
100s/50s	0/0
Top score	44 not out
Balls bowled	10489
Wickets	206
Bowling average	28.84
5 wickets in innings	5
10 wickets in match	1
Best bowling	7/88
Catches/stumpings	59/0
- Source: Cricinfo, 26 July 2014

24th President of BCCI
- In office 1996–1999
- Preceded by: Inderjit Singh Bindra
- Succeeded by: A. C. Muthiah

Raj Singh Dungarpur (19 December 1935 – 12 September 2009) was a president of Board of Control for Cricket in India. He played first class cricket for 16 years and was in and out of the Board of Control for more than 20 years. He was a selector of the national team for two terms. He also managed the Indian cricket team four times on overseas tours.

As the chairman of the selection committee, Dungarpur introduced Sachin Tendulkar to international cricket by selecting him for India's 1989 tour of Pakistan when he was just 16 years old. He is also credited for establishing the National Cricket Academy in Bangalore.

== Biography ==
Maharaj Raj Singh was born in the erstwhile princely state of Dungarpur in Rajasthan (then called Rajputana) on 19 December 1935. He was the youngest son of Maharawal Lakshman Singhji, the ruler of Dungarpur. He has two brothers, namely, Jaisinghji and Mahipalsinghji, and three sisters, one of whom is the Maharani of Bikaner. He studied at Daly College, Indore. He was the long-term romantic partner of Lata Mangeshkar, the legendary singer.

He played for the Rajasthan cricket team and Central Zone cricket team, appearing in 86 first class cricket matches from 1955 to 1971, and taking 206 wickets as a medium-pace bowler. In Rajasthan's victory over Vidarbha in 1967-68 he took his best figures of 7 for 88 and 5 for 55. He was appointed as the Manager of the Indian cricket team on a number of tours.

He was also the president of Cricket Club of India, Mumbai for 13 years. He served as the president of the Board of Control for Cricket in India for two terms. His last cricketing stint was as the manager of the Indian team to Pakistan.

He died on 12 September 2009, after a prolonged battle with Alzheimer's disease, in Mumbai, aged 73. His funeral was held at Dungarpur.
