= R. E. Grant Govan =

British industrialist

1st President of BCCI
- In office 1928–1933
- Preceded by: Office established
- Succeeded by: Sikandar Hayat Khan

Personal details
- Born: December 1891 Croydon, England
- Died: 26 January 1940 (aged 48) Haridwar, British Raj

Raymond Eustace Grant Govan, CBE (known more often as R.E. Grant Govan and also as REG Govan; December 1891, in Croydon district – 26 January 1940, in Hardwar, United Provinces) was a British industrialist based in Delhi and the first President of the Board of Control for Cricket in India.

== Career ==
Grant Govan came to India in 1910 and in 1920, founded Govan Brothers which became a leading business house of the time. He had two brothers both of whom were employed in the Govan Brothers.The company was managing agents for a number of industrial enterprises.

Grant Govan was a keen pilot and the founder of Indian National Airways Ltd, an aviation company formed in 1933 under Govan Bros Ltd. Apart from the airline, Govan Bros operated Delhi Flour Mills, set up Sugar Mills-Raza Buland at Rampur, Uttar Pradesh, and had a travel department, Govan Agencies (the Govan Bros Ltd businesses were sold in 1947 to the Ramkrishna Dalmia led Dalmia Group). Apart from the airline, Govan had other interests in aviation, like the Delhi Flying Club which he founded in 1928.

Grant Govan was an avid sports enthusiast. He founded the Roshanara Cricket Club in Delhi, named after the nearby tomb of Roshanara Begum, with a group of friends in 1922. The club was officially inaugurated by Marquess of Reading in December 1922. In 1928, he helped in sending the Indian hockey team to the Amsterdam Olympics by guaranteeing its expenses.

Grant Govan had the distinction of being both the founding President of the Board of Control for Cricket in India (BCCI) in 1928, a position he held till 1933 and the Cricket Club of India (CCI) in 1933. He, along with then BCCI secretary Anthony De Mello, was instrumental in getting the BCCI affiliated with the Imperial Cricket Conference (now International Cricket Council) in 1928. In 1931 BCCI with Govan at its helm invited the Marylebone Cricket Club to tour India for the first time, with the support of Lord Irwin, the then Viceroy of India.

Grant Govan died in Hardwar from a stroke in January 1940. He had been suffering from high blood pressure. Dr. P. Subbaroyan, then President of the (BCCI), issued a statement which read "In the death of Mr. Grant Govan, Indian Cricket has lost a friend ...". An obituarist in the Times of India lamented that 'Indian cricket's best friend has passed over... No man in recent years did more for Indian cricket than did the late R. E. Grant Govan'.

After his death, a few of his friends set up the Grant Govan Memorial Homes in Delhi. These are meant to be retirement homes for Anglo-Indians with limited means and were inaugurated by Marchioness of Linlithgow, wife of the then Viceroy of India in October 1940.
