= Mullanpur Garibdass =

- city
- Location in Punjab, India Mullanpur Garibdass (India)
- Coordinates: 30.799°N 76.743°E
- Country: India
- State: Punjab
- District: Mohali

Population (2011)
  - Total: 6,143

Languages
  - Official: Punjabi
  - Regional: Puadhi
- Time zone: UTC+5:30 (IST)
- PIN: 140901

Mullanpur Garibdass is a town in Mohali district in the Indian state of Punjab, north of the city of Mohali and Chandigarh. Mullanpur Garibdass village is located in vicinity of this town.

== History ==
This town was founded by Garibdass, a commander of King Hathnoria Raja. The full name of the town is "Mullanpur Garibdass Da". Legend has it that Jayanti Devi, the Roop of Durga, asked Garibdass to fight against the cruel king to save civilians. Garibdass won the war and founded Mullanpur as the first village of his empire.

== Demographics ==
As of 2001 India census, Mullanpur Garibdass had a population of 6143. Males constitute 53% of the population and females 47%. Mullanpur- Garibdas has an average literacy rate of 72%, higher than the national average of 59.5%: male literacy is 76%, and female literacy is 67%. In Mullanpur- Garibdas, 13% of the population is under 6 years of age. As of 2011 Census of India, 51.27 percent of residents are Sikhs and 46.20% are Hindus. Greater Mohali Area Development Authority has a low-density residential scheme in this town.

The table below shows the population of different religious groups in Mullanpur Garib Dass town, as of 2011 census.

Population by religious groups in Mullanpur Garib Dass town, 2011 census
Religion	Total	Female	Male
Hindu	3,161	1,478	1,683
Sikh	2,848	1,358	1,490
Muslim	131	63	68
Christian	18	8	10
Not stated	7	2	5
Total	6,165	2,909	3,256

== Sports ==
Mullanpur Garibdass is the home of the Maharaja Yadavindra Singh International Cricket Stadium. It is the new home venue for the Punjab Kings in IPL. The stadium is named after Yadavindra Singh, who played one Test for India in 1934. The stadium, which has hosted domestic matches, is a modern facility and has a capacity of 38,000 people. There are plans for the Government of Punjab to develop a golf course on 150 hectares in Mullanpur as well as a spa village and turf club with indoor and outdoor stadiums, and a lifestyle club.

== See also ==
- New Chandigarh
- Mirzapur, Mohali
- Mullanpur International Cricket Stadium
