= Punjab Cricket Association =

Sport governing body

- Sport: Cricket
- Jurisdiction: Punjab
- Abbreviation: PCA
- Founded: 1956
- Affiliation: Board of Control for Cricket in India
- Affiliation date: 1966
- Regional affiliation: North Zone
- Headquarters: Punjab Cricket Association IS Bindra Stadium
- Location: Mohali
- President: Gulzar Inder Chahal
- Chairman: Inderjit Singh Bindra
- Secretary: Dilsher Khanna

Official website
- www.cricketpunjab.in
- (India)

Punjab Cricket Association is the governing body for cricket activities in the state of Punjab in India and the Punjab cricket team and the Punjab women's cricket team. It is affiliated to the Board of Control for Cricket in India.

Currently there are two international cricket stadiums (Mohali and Mullanpur) in Punjab under PCA. It has produced players such as Yuvraj Singh, Harmanpreet Kaur, Shubman Gill, Kapil Dev, Abhishek Sharma, Harbhajan Singh, Arshdeep Singh, Amanjot Kaur, Ramandeep Singh, Mayank Markande, Mandeep Singh, Sidharth Kaul.

== History ==
The Punjab Cricket Association (PCA) was established in 1956 and became affiliated with the Board of Control for Cricket in India (BCCI) in 1966, administering cricketing activities across the state of Punjab and the Union Territory of Chandigarh. PCA built its headquarters at the I.S. Bindra Stadium (originally Mohali Stadium), which was established in 1993 and serves as its primary international venue. Over time, PCA's operations evolved from being headquartered in the residences of officials to constructing world-class infrastructure. It expanded its coaching, tournaments, and talent development programs throughout major districts including Amritsar, Jalandhar, Patiala, Ludhiana, Mohali, as well as outlying regions such as Kapurthala, Hoshiarpur, Bathinda, Faridkot, Ferozepur, Sangrur, Barnala , Muktsar, Nawanshahar.

- 2024 Sher-e-Punjab T20 Cup
- 2026 Shere-e-Punjab T20 League
