= Maharaja Trophy KSCA T20 =

Twenty20 cricket league in Karnataka, India

- Countries: India
- Administrator: Karnataka State Cricket Association
- Format: Twenty20 cricket
- First edition: 2022
- Latest edition: 2026
- Next edition: 2027
- Tournament format: Round Robin and Playoffs
- Number of teams: 6
- Current champion: Shivamogga Yodhas (1st title)
- Most successful: Gulbarga Mystics; Hubli Tigers; Mysore Warriors; Mangaluru Dragons; Shivamogga Yodhas (1 title each)
- Most runs: Karun Nair (1,686)
- Most wickets: Jagadeesha Suchith (32)
- TV: Sony Sports Ten 5 (TV); FanCode (Internet)
- Website: maharajatrophy.in Official Instagram

Maharaja Trophy KSCA T20 is a domestic Twenty20 cricket tournament in India organised by the Karnataka State Cricket Association (KSCA). Established in 2022, it replaced the Karnataka Premier League (KPL).

The tournament is contested by six teams representing different regions of the state of Karnataka and is played annually in a round-robin and knockout format.

== History ==
=== Origins and development ===
The Karnataka State Cricket Association (KSCA) established an early precedent for the Twenty20 format in India as early as 2005 through the organization of the Bradman Cup tournament. This foundational framework led to the creation of the Karnataka Premier League (KPL), a regional Twenty20 cricket tournament organized by the KSCA that completed eight seasons between 2009 and 2019.

Following a multi-year hiatus caused by the COVID-19 pandemic, the KSCA permanently dissolved the KPL structure and launched the Maharaja Trophy KSCA T20 on July 16, 2022, as its official spiritual successor. During the tournament's inaugural launch gala, then- KSCA President Roger Binny stated that the league was fundamentally engineered to sustain a state-level developmental pipeline, ensuring local club cricketers had a high-exposure platform to transition directly into national and Indian Premier League (IPL) teams.

=== Structure and nomenclature ===
The tournament was named in honour of Srikantadatta Narasimharaja Wadiyar, a prominent former president of the KSCA and the titular Maharaja of Mysore. Unlike the later iterations of the KPL which relied heavily on private franchise operations, the 2022 Maharaja Trophy was initially launched under a centralized, KSCA - administered model where the association managed all team logistics, coaching appointments, and squad selections.

The inaugural August 2022 edition featured six teams mapped to regional catchment sectors. While match results remained significant for individual regional fanbases, the KSCA reviewed the season as a structural success based on its core metric of unearthing and promoting unheralded domestic cricket talent from outside the metropolitan areas.

=== Trophy design ===
The tournament's championship trophy features a distinct regional design incorporating traditional royal motifs. The structure consists of a centrally engraved metal pillar flanked by eleven solid wings, symbolizing the eleven players of a cricket lineup. The face of the trophy features a carved portrait engraving honoring the late Srikantadatta Narasimharaja Wadiyar, the former scion of the Mysore Royal Family and long-time President of the KSCA.

== Rules and format ==
The Maharaja Trophy KSCA T20 follows the standard Twenty20 playing conditions prescribed by the International Cricket Council (ICC) and the Board of Control for Cricket in India (BCCI), with additional tournament-specific regulations implemented by the Karnataka State Cricket Association (KSCA).

=== Tournament format ===
The tournament is contested by six franchises representing different regions of Karnataka. During the league stage, each team plays every other team twice in a double round-robin format, resulting in 30 league matches.

The top four teams in the points table at the end of the league stage qualify for the playoffs. Since 2023, the tournament has followed the Indian Premier League playoff system:

- Qualifier 1 – 1st place vs 2nd place; winner advances directly to the final.
- Eliminator – 3rd place vs 4th place; loser is eliminated.
- Qualifier 2 – loser of Qualifier 1 vs winner of the Eliminator.
- Final – winner of Qualifier 1 vs winner of Qualifier 2.

=== Squad regulations ===
Franchises are permitted to maintain squads consisting of a minimum of 16 players and a maximum of 20 players. Player eligibility is restricted to cricketers registered with clubs, institutions or affiliated units under the Karnataka State Cricket Association.

To promote regional representation, each franchise is structurally required to include players from its designated geographic catchment area within its squad structure.

=== Rule changes ===
The tournament's playing conditions have been periodically amended by the KSCA to introduce new tactical parameters and technological aids:

Season	Rule change
2023	Introduction of the Impact Player rule, aligning the tournament with domestic BCCI competitions and the Indian Premier League.
2025	Introduction of the Decision Review System (DRS) to assist on-field umpiring decisions.
2026	Introduction of the updated Impact Player rule, mandating that teams must submit their finalized Playing XIs prior to the coin toss.
2026	Runs scored during a delivery where an on-field "out" decision is subsequently overturned by DRS are officially credited to the batting side.
2026	Runs attempted by the batting side when a batsman is bowled or caught on a free-hit delivery are voided and recorded as a dot ball.

== Teams ==
Six franchises are competing in the league. The franchises are named after the cities they represent in the state.

Location of Maharaja Trophy KSCA T20 teams

Teams	Captain	Owner(s)
Kalyani Bengaluru Blasters	Shubhang Hegde	Kalyani Motors
Gulbarga Mystics	Manish Pandey	Gulbarga Megaspeed Broadband
Hubli Tigers	Vijaykumar Vyshak	Jindal Steel
Mysore Warriors	Devdutt Padikkal	NR Group
Shivamogga Yodhas	Smaran Ravichandran	—N/a
Coastal Kings Mangaluru	Karun Nair	—N/a

== Player acquisition ==
The methods used to allocate players to teams have evolved since the tournament's inception in 2022.

=== 2022 ===
The inaugural player draft, known as the Maha Draft, was held on 30 July 2022 at the M. Chinnaswamy Stadium in Bengaluru. A total of 740 players were available for selection across four categories: Category A (India and IPL players), Category B (senior state players), Category C (under-25, under-23 and under-19 players) and Category D (emerging talent),.

Teams selected 18 players through the centralized draft process before completing their squads with two additional players from their designated regional catchment areas, resulting in a squad size of 20 players. The draft was conducted by coaching and management groups appointed by the KSCA. Notable players selected during the draft included Karun Nair, Manish Pandey, Mayank Agarwal, Krishnappa Gowtham and Abhimanyu Mithun.

=== 2023 ===
Ahead of the 2023 season, the tournament adopted a franchise-based model and introduced a player auction in place of the draft system used during the inaugural edition. More than 700 cricketers from across Karnataka were made available for selection and were grouped into four categories based on their playing credentials as defined in previous season. The inaugural 2023 auction was also held at the M. Chinnaswamy Stadium in Bengaluru.

The auction featured six franchises: Bengaluru Blasters, Gulbarga Mystics, Hubli Tigers, Mysore Warriors, Mangaluru Dragons and Shivamogga Lions. Players were acquired through competitive bidding, with Abhinav Manohar becoming the most expensive player after being purchased by Shivamogga Lions for ₹15 lakh. Mayank Agarwal was acquired by Kalyani Bengaluru Blasters for ₹14 lakh, while Devdutt Padikkal joined Gulbarga Mystics for ₹13.2 lakh.

According to tournament commissioner, B. K. Sampath Kumar, the 2023 season marked the return of the franchise model, with team owners participating directly in the player auction.

=== 2024 ===
Ahead of the 2024 season, the tournament introduced a player retention system for the first time. Each franchise was permitted to retain up to four players from its 2023 squad before the auction. The remaining squad positions were filled through a player auction conducted at the M. Chinnaswamy Stadium onBengaluru 25 July 2024.

More than 1,400 players registered for the season, with 240 players shortlisted for the auction. Players were divided into four categories based on their playing experience and credentials. Teams were required to maintain squads of between 16 and 20 players, including at least two players from their designated catchment areas.

L. R. Chethan became the most expensive player in the auction after being acquired by Bengaluru Blasters for ₹8.6 lakh. Other notable purchases included Shreyas Gopal (₹7.6 Lakh) by Mangaluru Dragons and Krishnappa Gowtham(₹7.4 Lakh) by Mysore Warriors. According to tournament commissioner B. K. Sampath Kumar, the introduction of player retentions was intended to provide continuity while allowing franchises to strengthen their squads through the auction.

=== 2025 ===
Prior to the 2025 season, franchises were again permitted to retain up to four players from their previous squads before participating in the player auction. Teams were required to maintain squads consisting of 16 to 18 players.

Several established players, including Mayank Agarwal, Karun Nair, Prasidh Krishna and Vyshak Vijaykumar were retained by their respective franchises ahead of the auction.

The player auction was held on 15 July 2025. Devdutt Padikkal became the most expensive player of the auction after being acquired by Hubli Tigers for ₹13.2 lakh. Other notable acquisitions included Abhinav Manohar by Hubli Tigers and Vidwath Kaverappa by Shivamogga Lions.

=== 2026 ===
Ahead of the 2026 season, the tournament underwent a major restructuring as two franchises changed ownership and identity. Mangaluru Dragons was rebranded as Coastal Kings Mangaluru, while Shivamogga Lions became Shivamogga Yodhas. The changes were accompanied by a squad reset, with most players returning to the auction pool under a revamped player acquisition system.

The player auction was held on 5 June 2026, with each franchise operating under a salary purse of ₹60 lakh. The auction witnessed record spending, as Karun Nair was acquired by Coastal Kings Mangaluru for ₹18 lakh, becoming the most expensive player in the tournament's history. Other notable acquisitions included Smaran Ravichandran by Shivamogga Yodhas for ₹15.75 lakh, Abhinav Manohar by Hubli Tigers for ₹13.5 lakh and Manish Pandey by Gulbarga Mystics for ₹12.75 lakh.

Several high-profile players were affected by availability concerns. India international K. L. Rahul went unsold due to national team commitments, while Devdutt Padikkal and Prasidh Krishna were acquired by Mysore Warriors for ₹2.6 lakh each owing to their limited availability during the tournament.

=== Most expensive auction purchases ===
Season	Player	Team	Price	Ref.
2023	Abhinav Manohar	Shivamogga Lions	₹15.00 lakh	
2024	L. R. Chethan	Bengaluru Blasters	₹8.60 lakh	
2025	Devdutt Padikkal	Hubli Tigers	₹13.20 lakh	
2026	Karun Nair	Coastal Kings Mangaluru	₹18.00 lakh	

The inaugural 2022 season did not feature an auction. Players were allocated through a draft system with fixed salary categories.

== Tournament results ==
Season	Venue	Winners	Result	Runners-up	Player of the season
2022	M. Chinnaswamy Stadium, Bengaluru	Gulbarga Mystics; 220/3 (20 overs)	Gulbarga Mystics won by 11 runs Scorecard	Bengaluru Blasters; 209/9 (20 overs)	Rohan Patil
2023	M. Chinnaswamy Stadium, Bengaluru	Hubli Tigers; 203/8 (20 overs)	Hubli Tigers won by 8 runs Scorecard	Mysuru Warriors; 195/8 (20 overs)	Mohammed Taha
2024	M. Chinnaswamy Stadium, Bengaluru	Mysore Warriors; 207/4 (20 overs)	Mysore Warriors won by 45 runs Scorecard	Bengaluru Blasters; 162/8 (20 overs)	Karun Nair
2025	Srikantadatta Narasimha Raja Wadeyar Ground, Mysore	Mangaluru Dragons; 85/2 (10.2 overs)	Mangaluru Dragons won by 14 runs (VJD method); Scorecard	Hubli Tigers; 154/8 (20 overs)	Sharath B. R.
2026	M. Chinnaswamy Stadium, Bengaluru	Shivamogga Yoddhas 186/6 (20 overs)	Shivamogga Yoddhas won by 4 wickets Scorecard	Kalyani Bengaluru Blasters 185/8 (20 overs)	Shubhang Hegde

== Performance by teams ==
The following table summarises the overall performances of teams in the Maharaja Trophy KSCA T20. Teams are ranked by the number of championships won, followed by runners-up finishes and playoff appearances.

Team	Winners	Runners-up	Playoffs	Seasons
Hubli Tigers	1 (2023)	1 (2025)	4	5
Mysore Warriors	1 (2024)	1 (2023)	4	5
Gulbarga Mystics	1 (2022)	—	4	5
Coastal Kings Mangaluru	1 (2025)	—	2	5
Shivamogga Yodhas	1 (2026)	—	2	5
Kalyani Bengaluru Blasters	—	3 (2022, 2024, 2026)	4	5

- Champions
- Runners-up

=== Seasons ===
Current team	2022	2023	2024	2025	2026
Kalyani Bengaluru Blasters	RU	6th	RU	4th	RU
Gulbarga Mystics	C	3rd	4th	3rd	5th
Hubli Tigers	4th	C	3rd	RU	6th
Coastal Kings Mangaluru	5th	5th	6th	C	3rd
Mysore Warriors	3rd	RU	C	5th	4th
Shivamogga Yodhas	6th	4th	5th	6th	C

- C : Champions
- RU : Runners-up
- 3rd : Qualifier 2 loser (third place)
- 4th : Eliminator loser (fourth place)
- 5th / 6 : League stage finish

=== Positions each season ===
The following table shows the final league-stage positions of teams in each season of the Maharaja Trophy KSCA T20. Cell colours indicate the team's final result in the tournament.

Position	2022	2023	2024	2025	2026
1st	Bengaluru	Hubli	Bengaluru	Hubli	Bengaluru
2nd	Gulbarga	Mysore	Mysore	Mangaluru	Mangaluru
3rd	Mysore	Gulbarga	Hubli	Gulbarga	Shivamogga
4th	Hubli	Shivamogga	Gulbarga	Bengaluru	Mysore
5th	Mangaluru	Mangaluru	Shivamogga	Mysore	Gulbarga
6th	Shivamogga	Bengaluru	Mangaluru	Shivamogga	Hubli

- Champions
- Runners-up
- Playoffs

== All-time standings ==
Teams are ordered by total winning percentage, then by best result, then alphabetically.

Team	Appearances			Best result	Statistics						
Team	Total	First	Latest	Best result	Played	Won	Lost	NR	Win%	Playoffs	Finals
Kalyani Bengaluru Blasters	5	2022	2026	Runners-up (2022, 2024, 2026)	57	32	24	1	56.14	4	3
Gulbarga Mystics	5	2022	2026	Champions (2022)	54	27	26	1	50	4	1
Mysore Warriors	5	2022	2026	Champions (2024)	56	27	27	2	48.21	4	2
Hubli Tigers	5	2022	2026	Champions (2023)	55	26	27	2	47.27	4	2
Coastal Kings Mangaluru	5	2022	2026	Champions (2025)	55	23	30	2	41.82	2	1
Shivamogga Yodhas	5	2022	2026	Champions (2026)	55	22	32	1	40	2	1

== Records and statistics ==
As of 18 July 2026

Batting records
Most runs	Karun Nair	1,429
Most fours	LR Chethan	128
Most sixes	Abhinav Manohar	133
Most centuries	Karun Nair	2
Most half-centuries	Karun Nair	11
Most runs in a season	Karun Nair	560 (2024)
Best strike rate	Abhinav Manohar	168.25
Highest individual score	Karun Nair (MW)	124* (48) vs MD (August 19, 2024)
Highest partnership	Shubhang Hegde & Suraj Ahuja (BB)	169 vs SL; August 28, 2024
Bowling records
Most wickets	Abhilash Shetty	52
Best bowling figures	Lavish Kaushal (BB)	5/17 vs HT (August 23, 2024)
Most wickets in a season	Kranthi Kumar (MD)	26
Best economy rate	Mitrakanth Singh	6.43
Fielding records
Most dismissals as wicket-keeper	Sharath BR	29
Most catches as fielder	Manish Pandey	32
Team records
Highest total	Mysuru Warriors (MW)	248/2(20) vs Gulbarga Mystics (August 28, 2024)
Lowest total	Bengaluru Blasters	105/10(18.4) Vs Hubli Tigers (16 Aug 2023)

== End-of-season awards ==
=== Prize money ===
The Maharaja Trophy KSCA T20 offers a total prize pool of ₹35 lakh. The distribution of prize money is as follows:

- Champions: ₹15 lakh
- Runners-up: ₹10 lakh
- Losing semi-finalists: ₹5 lakh each

The two losing semi-finalists share ₹10 lakh, bringing the total tournament prize pool to ₹35 lakh.

=== Player of the Match ===
The Player of the Match award is presented after each match to the player adjudged to have made the most significant contribution to the result of the match. The recipient receives a cash prize of ₹10,000.

=== Player of the Tournament ===
The Player of the Tournament award is presented to the player considered to have delivered the most outstanding overall performance during a season. The recipient receives a cash prize of ₹25,000.

=== Orange Cap ===
The Orange Cap is awarded to the leading run-scorer of a season. The recipient receives a cash prize of ₹25,000.

=== Purple Cap ===
The Purple Cap is awarded to the leading wicket-taker of a season. The recipient receives a cash prize of ₹25,000.

=== Award winners ===
Season	Champions	Runners-up	Player of the Tournament (₹25,000)	Orange Cap (₹25,000)	Purple Cap (₹25,000)
2022	Gulbarga Mystics	Bengaluru Blasters	Rohan Patil	Mayank Agarwal (BB); 496	Vidyadhar Patil (MW); 17
2023	Hubli Tigers	Mysuru Warriors	Mohammed Taha (HT)	Karun Nair (MW); 532	Manvanth Kumar (HT); 22
2024	Mysuru Warriors	Bengaluru Blasters	Karun Nair (MW)	Karun Nair (MW); 560	Kumar LR (HT); 17
2025	Mangaluru Dragons	Hubli Tigers	Devdutt Padikkal (HT)	Devdutt Padikkal (HT); 439	Kranthi Kumar (MD); 26
2026	Shivamogga Yodhas	Kalyani Bengaluru Blasters	Shubhang Hegde (KBB)	Luvnith Sisodia (SY); 465	Abhilash Shetty (MD); 18

== Finances ==
=== Sponsorship ===
Title sponsorship forms a key component of the Maharaja Trophy KSCA T20's commercial structure, providing financial support for tournament operations, marketing activities and prize-money distribution. In return, sponsors receive naming rights, with the tournament officially carrying the sponsor's name throughout the season.

The KSCA announced the Shriram Group as the inaugural title sponsor of the tournament ahead of its launch in 2022.

Shriram Capital, the holding company of the Shriram Group, is an Indian financial services conglomerate with interests in lending, insurance, wealth management and asset management. The company initially signed a three-year title sponsorship agreement covering the 2022–2024 seasons, with the partnership subsequently extended for the 2025 season.

Ahead of the 2026 season, Dacss Granites & Marbles, a Karnataka-based manufacturer and supplier of granite, marble and other building materials, acquired the tournament's title sponsorship rights.

Season	Title sponsor	Official partners / Associated sponsors
2022	Shriram Capital	Nippon Paint, Cycle Pure Agarbathies, Canara Bank
2023	Shriram Capital	FanCode,Cycle Pure Agarbathies, Meenakshi TMT, Rolls on Wheels, Puma, Manipal Hospitals, Radio Mirchi 98.3 FM
2024	Shriram Capital	FanCode, Cycle Pure Agarbathies, Sherif Bhai Dakhni Biryani, Manipal Hospitals, Radio Mirchi 98.3 FM, Khaja Bandanawaz University, Star Sports, Paytm Insider
2025	Shriram Capital	FanCode, Vimal Elaichi, Cycle Pure Agarbathies, Meenakshi Steel, Khaja Bandanawaz University, Manipal Hospitals, Radio Mirchi 98.3 FM, Star Sports
2026	Dacss Granites & Marbles	FanCode, District by Zomato, Vimal Elaichi, Adarsh Group, Cycle Pure Agarbathies, Sunvik, 92.7 BIG FM, Sony Sports Network

== Broadcasting ==
Season	Year	Television	Digital Streaming	Ref
1	2022	Star Sports	FanCode	
2	2023	Star Sports	FanCode	
3	2024	Star Sports	FanCode	
4	2025	Star Sports	FanCode	
5	2026	Sony Sports Network	FanCode	
