= M. Chinnaswamy =

Indian cricket administrator

M. Chinnaswamy Mudaliyar

17th President of the Board of Control for Cricket in India
- In office 1977–1980
- Preceded by: Ramprakash Mehra
- Succeeded by: S. K. Wankhede

Secretary of the Board of Control for Cricket in India
- In office 1960–1965
- Preceded by: A. N. Ghose
- Succeeded by: S. Sriraman

Personal details
- Born: 29 March 1900 Mandya, Kingdom of Mysore
- Died: 8 November 1991 (aged 91)
- Occupation: Lawyer

Mangalam Chinnaswamy Mudaliyar (29 March 1900 – 8 November 1991) was an Indian cricket administrator and lawyer. He was born in Mandya.

He was the President of Board of Control for Cricket in India from 1977 to 1980 and Secretary from 1960 to 1965. He also served as the vice president and joint secretary for long terms. He represented India in the International Cricket Council in 1965, 1973 and 1977 - 1980. A lawyer by profession, he actively practiced from 1925 till 1975.

He was one of the founders of the Karnataka State Cricket Association (KSCA). He served as the secretary from 1953 to 1978 and as the President from 1978 to 1990. He was the treasurer and second official to the Indian tour of Australia in 1967-68 and as the manager when Australia returned the visit two years later. MCC honoured him with a life membership in 1969.

He was the driving force behind the construction of the KSCA stadium in Bengaluru. He was helped by many eminent people, was responsible in prevailing upon the Karnataka government to allot the ground for cricket in the MG Road area in 1969. This was named M. Chinnaswamy Stadium much against his wishes.

He died on 8 November 1991 after a long illness.
