= Karnataka State Cricket Association =

Governing body of cricket in Karnataka, India

- ಕರ್ನಾಟಕ ರಾಜ್ಯ ಕ್ರಿಕೆಟ್ ಸಂಸ್ಥೆ
- Sport: Cricket
- Jurisdiction: Karnataka
- Abbreviation: KSCA
- Founded: 1933 (93 years ago); as Mysore State Cricket Association * 1973 (53 years ago); renamed as Karnataka State Cricket Association
- Affiliation: Board of Control for Cricket in India
- Affiliation date: 1934
- Headquarters: Bengaluru, Karnataka, India
- President: Venkatesh Prasad
- Vice president: Sujith Somasundar
- Coach: Yere Goud

Official website
- www.ksca.cricket
- Other key staff: B. K. Ravi (Joint Secretary) * B. N. Madhukar (Treasurer)
- (India)

The Karnataka State Cricket Association (KSCA) is the governing body of cricket in the Indian state of Karnataka. Affiliated with the Board of Control for Cricket in India (BCCI), the association governs the Karnataka cricket team and the Karnataka women's cricket team. Founded in 1933 as the Mysore State Cricket Association, it gained BCCI affiliation in 1934. The KSCA operates the M. Chinnaswamy Stadium in Bengaluru, which hosts international Test, ODI, and T20 matches, alongside regional grounds in Hubballi, Belagavi, Mysuru, and Shivamogga.

Former Indian international cricketer Venkatesh Prasad was elected president of the association on 7 December 2025.

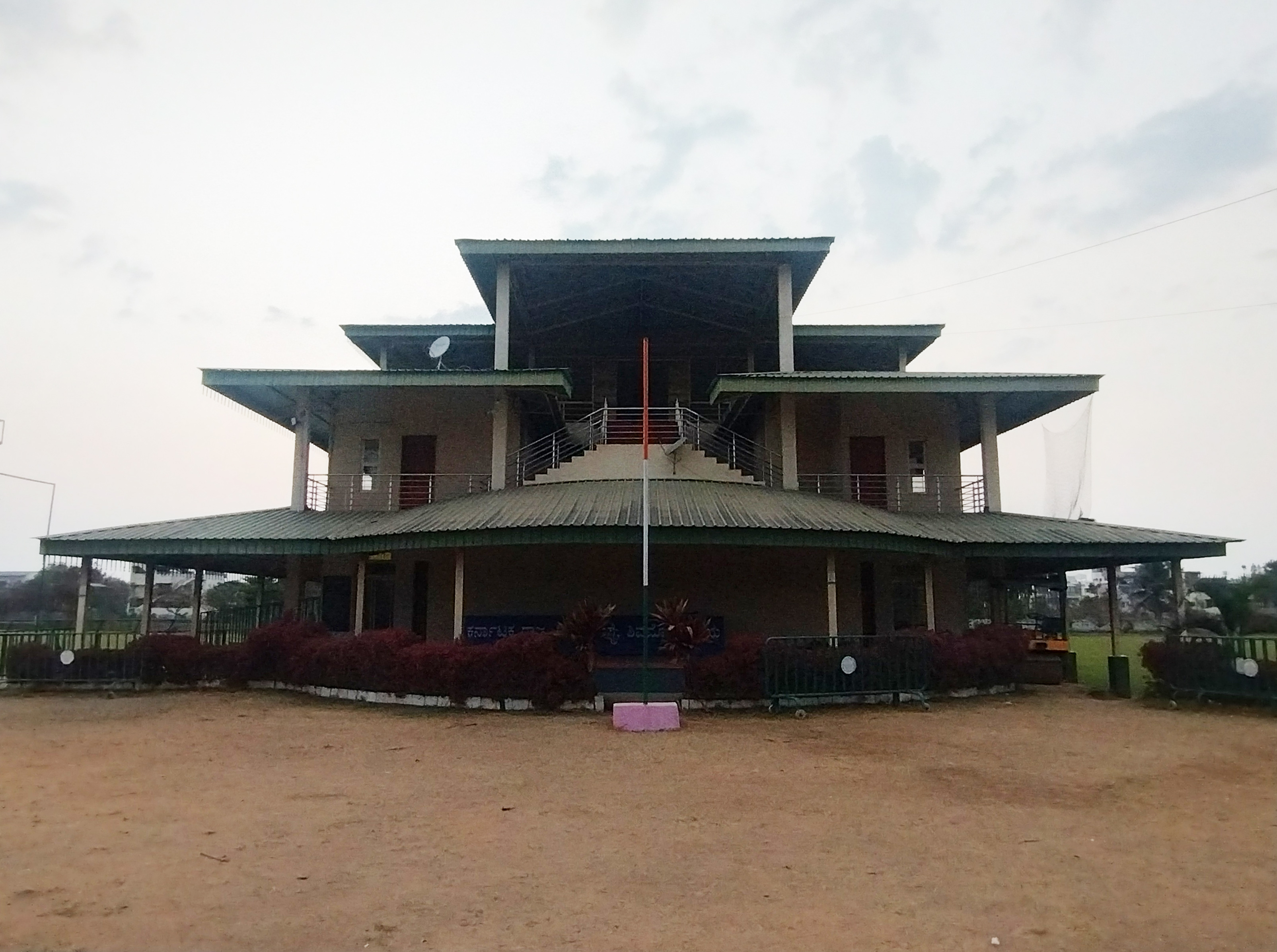
KSCA cricket stadium, Shivamogga (2026)

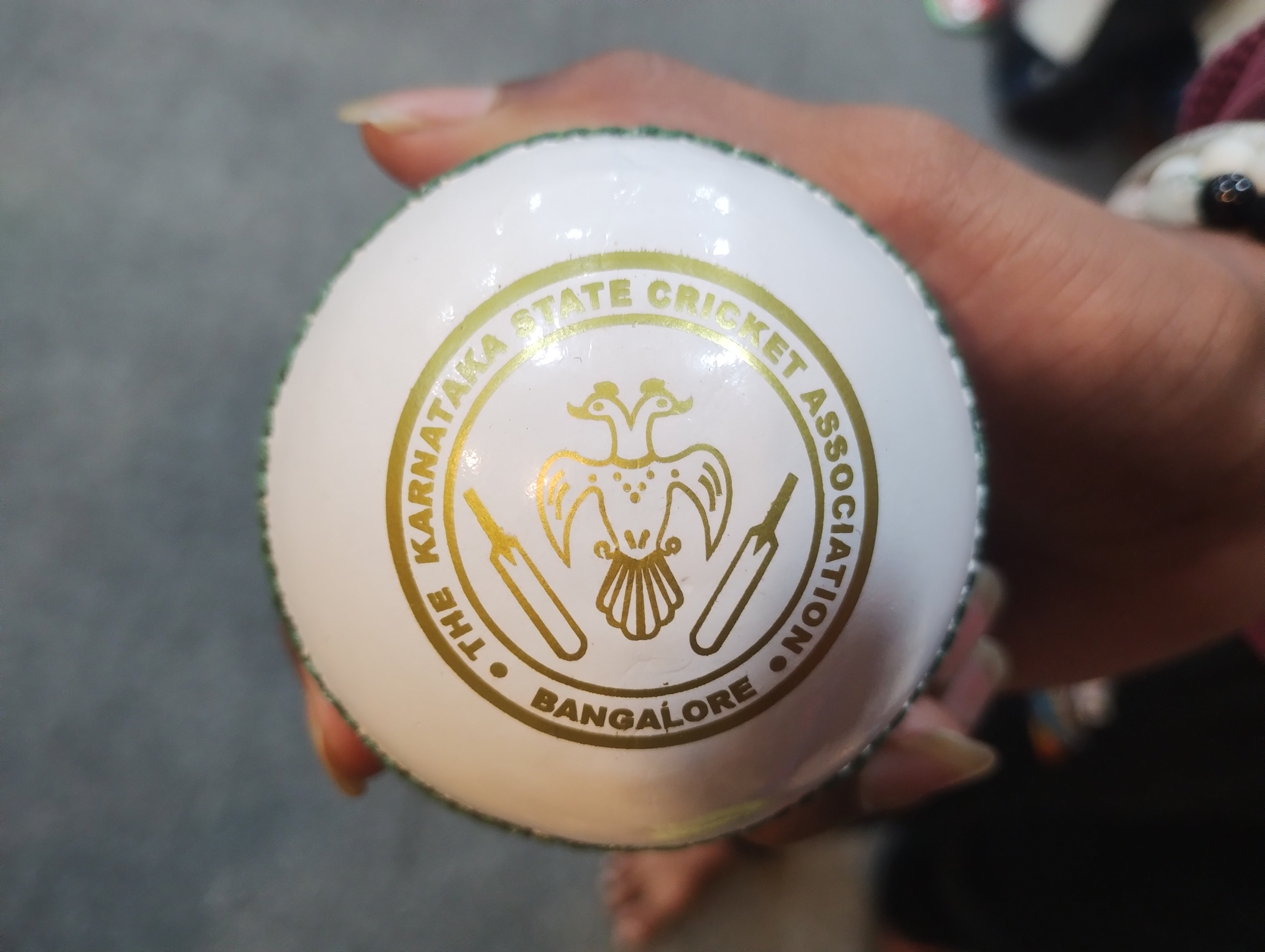
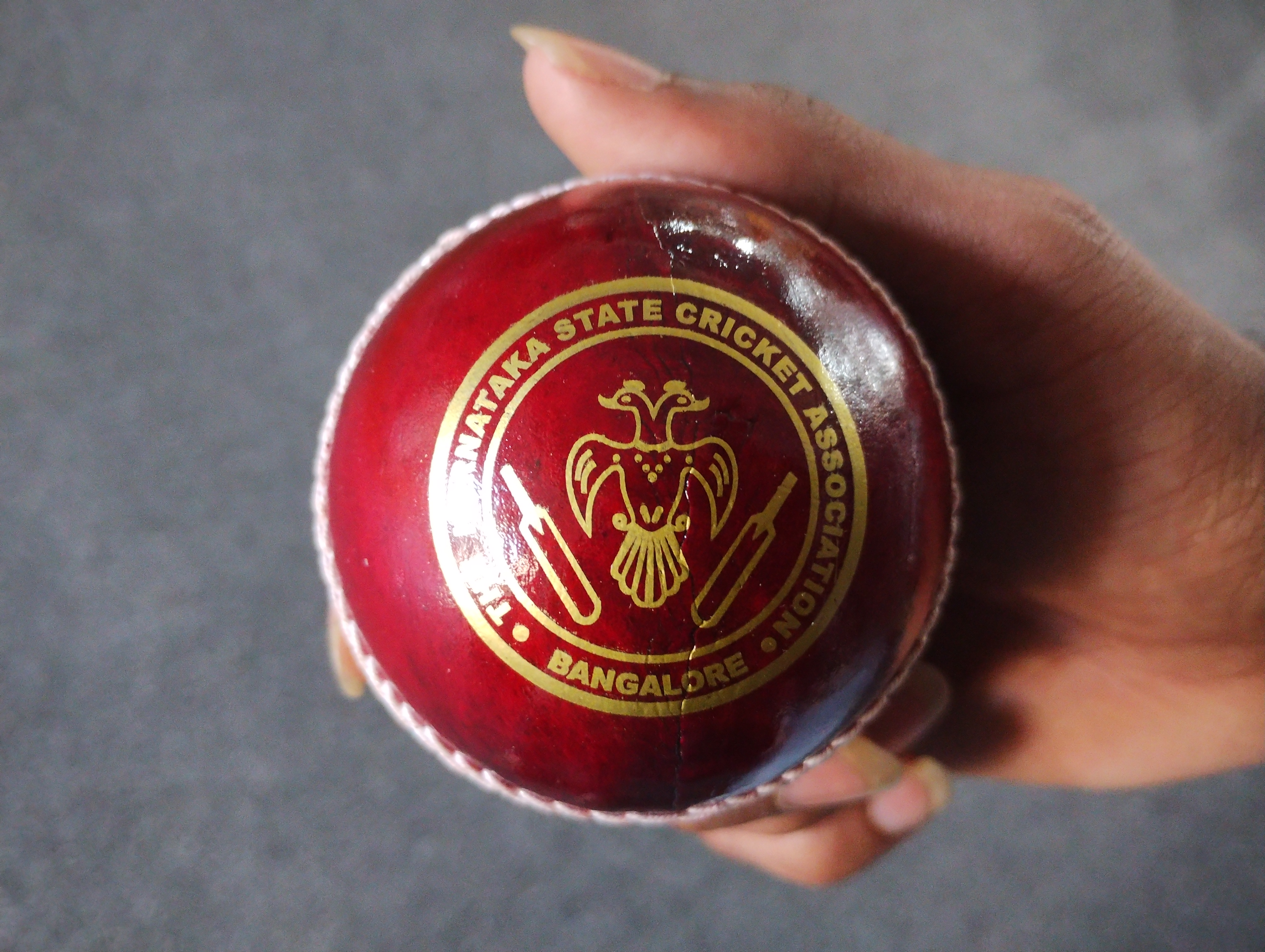
White and red cricket balls used by the KSCA (2026)

== History ==
=== Early years and formation (1920s–1940s) ===
Prior to the formation of a state-level body, organized cricket in the princely state of Mysore developed through school and college tournaments in Bengaluru and Mysuru, alongside early club competition in Hubballi–Dharwad. The establishment of private clubs in the early 1920s—led by the Bangalore United Cricket Club (BUCC), which predates the association—prompted inter-city fixtures across Bengaluru, Mysuru, Shivamogga, Chikkamagaluru, and Tumakuru.

In 1933, administrators formed the Mysore State Cricket Association (also referred to as the Mysore Cricket Association) and secured affiliation with the Board of Control for Cricket in India (BCCI) in 1934. Key figures behind this effort included English educator J. C. Rollo (the association's first president), Justice P. Medappa, Capt. T. Murari, Major Y. V. K. Murthy, and Capt. M. G. Vijayasarathi. Initially operating from a small room at the Central College pavilion in Bengaluru, the association fielded Mysore's inaugural Ranji Trophy team on 4 November 1934 against Madras (now Tamil Nadu)—the first-ever match in Ranji Trophy history, which concluded in a single day with Madras winning by an innings and 23 runs.

=== Stadium construction and administrative growth (1950s–1990s) ===
During the 1950s and 1960s, the association expanded under S. A. Srinivasan (honorary treasurer from 1953 and president from 1961 to 1973) and M. Chinnaswamy (honorary secretary from 1953 to 1978 and president from 1978 to 1990). Through Chinnaswamy's negotiations with the state government and the Ministry of Defence, the association acquired 16.25 acres of land on MG Road in Bengaluru to build its own permanent venue.

Following the renaming of Mysore State to Karnataka in 1973, the body adopted its current name. In 1974–75, it moved its headquarters to the newly built KSCA Stadium (later renamed the M. Chinnaswamy Stadium), which hosted its inaugural Test match that season against the touring West Indies cricket team. Under longtime secretary C. Nagaraj (1978–1998), the association modernized stadium infrastructure and installed floodlights ahead of the 1996 Cricket World Cup, notably hosting the India–Pakistan quarter-final.

=== Modern era (1998–present) ===
In the 1998 KSCA elections, a group of former international and first-class cricketers took over administration, with K. M. Ramprasad elected president and Brijesh Patel elected secretary. Over the subsequent decades, the association expanded regional cricket infrastructure beyond Bengaluru—developing stadiums in Hubballi, Mysuru, Belagavi, and Shivamogga—while former Indian internationals Anil Kumble (2010), Roger Binny (2019), and Venkatesh Prasad (2025) later served as presidents.

== Stadiums and venues ==
=== M. Chinnaswamy Stadium, Bengaluru ===
The M. Chinnaswamy Stadium in central Bengaluru is owned by the Government of Karnataka and leased to the KSCA on a 100-year agreement. Located between Cubbon Park and MG Road, the venue was established in 1969 as the Karnataka State Cricket Association Stadium and was later renamed in honour of M. Chinnaswamy, a founding member of the association who served as its honorary secretary (1953–1978), president (1978–1990), and president of the Board of Control for Cricket in India (1977–1980). With a seating capacity of 40,000, the stadium hosts international Test, ODI, and T20I matches and serves as the home ground for the Karnataka men's and women's state teams as well as Royal Challengers Bengaluru.

In April 2015, the KSCA commissioned a 400 kW rooftop solar photovoltaic plant across the stadium's east stand under its "Go Green" initiative, making it the first cricket venue in the world to use rooftop solar panels to power stadium operations. Comprising 1,422 solar modules, the installation generates approximately 590,000 units of electricity annually and feeds surplus power into the local grid via net metering. In January 2017, the stadium installed a SubAir sub-surface aeration and vacuum drainage system capable of clearing standing water from the outfield within minutes after rainfall.

Following a fatal crowd crush outside the stadium in June 2025, large-scale matches were suspended pending structural safety upgrades. In March 2026, a Karnataka government expert committee granted formal safety clearance for the venue to resume hosting IPL 2026 matches after the KSCA added six new entry gates, widened spectator passages, converted adjacent premises into fan holding areas, and partnered with Namma Metro for integrated match-day transit. In May 2026, following the shifting of the IPL 2026 final from Bengaluru, the KSCA initiated an architectural redevelopment plan to expand seating capacity and upgrade stadium floodlights to LED systems.

=== Regional stadiums and grounds ===
To decentralize domestic cricket beyond Bengaluru, the KSCA operates and manages several venues across Karnataka's administrative zones:

- D. R. Bendre KSCA Stadium, Hubballi: Located in Rajnagar, Hubballi, this 16,000-capacity stadium was inaugurated in November 2012 by then Chief Minister Jagadish Shettar and named after Kannada poet D. R. Bendre. Serving as Karnataka's primary venue in North Karnataka, it hosts Ranji Trophy, age-group, and Maharaja Trophy KSCA T20 fixtures, and hosted the 2025–26 Ranji Trophy final between Karnataka and Jammu & Kashmir in February 2026.
- Srikantadatta Narasimha Raja Wadeyar Ground, Mysuru: Situated on the Manasagangotri campus of the University of Mysore in Mysuru (commonly known as Gangotri Glades), this 15,000-capacity ground has been maintained by the KSCA under a long-term agreement since 1997. Upgraded with a pavilion complex in 2007, it has hosted international women's cricket—including a Women's Test between India and South Africa in 2014—as well as the 2009–10 Ranji Trophy final.
- KSCA Stadium, Belagavi: Located in Autonagar, Belagavi, this venue began hosting first-class matches during the 2016–17 Ranji Trophy season and serves as a regular venue for zonal and age-group tournaments.
- KSCA Cricket Ground, Shivamogga: Located at Navule in Shivamogga, the ground hosts Ranji Trophy and state-level fixtures. In September 2026, the KSCA laid the foundation stone for a ₹4.90 crore indoor training facility with four pitches on the campus—its first indoor stadium outside Bengaluru.
- Three Ovals KSCA Stadium, Alur: Situated on the outskirts of Bengaluru in Alur, this three-ground complex hosts Vijay Hazare Trophy, Syed Mushtaq Ali Trophy, and BCCI age-group tournaments alongside state league matches.

== Zonal structure and institutional members ==
The KSCA administers cricket across Karnataka through seven regional zones: Bengaluru, Mysuru, Dharwad, Mangaluru, Shivamogga, Tumakuru, and Raichur. Each zone oversees district-level leagues, age-group selection trials, and grassroots coaching programmes, with zonal convenors representing their regions on the association's managing committee.

More than 50 sports clubs and institutional bodies hold voting institutional membership with the KSCA. Prominent affiliated clubs participating in the KSCA's multi-tier league system (Divisions I through IV) include:

- Bengaluru Zone: Bangalore United Cricket Club, Swastic Union Cricket Club, Jawahar Sports Club, Mount Joy Cricket Club, Social Cricketers, Vultures Cricket Club, Friends Union Cricket Club, and The Bangalore Cricketers.
- Regional Zones: R. B. N. Cricket Club (Mysuru), Durgigudi Cricket Association (Shivamogga), Tumkur Occasionals (Tumakuru), and City XI Cricket Club (Raichur).

== Tournaments ==
In addition to hosting BCCI domestic fixtures for the state's senior, women's, and age-group teams, the KSCA organizes several annual competitions:

- Maharaja Trophy KSCA T20: Launched in 2022 as the successor to the former Karnataka Premier League (2009–2019), this six-team franchise Twenty20 tournament serves as the state's premier domestic T20 competition.
- Dr. K. Thimmappiah Memorial Tournament: An annual all-India multi-day invitation tournament hosted across Bengaluru, Mysuru, and Alur ahead of the Indian domestic season, featuring state teams and Cricket Association XIs from across India.
- KSCA Group I–IV League Championships: The year-round club league pyramid in Bengaluru and zonal divisions, serving as the primary selection pathway into Karnataka's state squads.

== Administration ==
=== Office bearers (2025–2028) ===
In the December 2025 KSCA elections, former India fast bowler Venkatesh Prasad defeated K. N. Shanth Kumar to become president, with his panel winning a majority of seats on the managing committee for the 2025–2028 term. In June 2026, BCCI Ombudsman Justice Arun Mishra disqualified elected secretary Santosh Menon upon determining that he had completed the cumulative nine-year tenure cap permitted for office bearers.

- President: Venkatesh Prasad
- Vice President: Sujith Somasundar
- Joint Secretary: B. K. Ravi
- Treasurer: B. N. Madhukar
- Institutional Managing Committee Members: V. M. Manjunath, Sailesh N. Poll, Kalpana Venkatachar, Avinash Vaidya, and Aashish Amarlall
- Zonal Convenors: R. Manjunath (Bengaluru Zone), Harsha S. (Mysuru Zone), Veeresh S. Talikoti (Dharwad Zone), Ratnakar Shetty (Mangaluru Zone), Nagendra H. S. (Shivamogga Zone), V. R. Lingaraju (Tumakuru Zone), and Sujith Kumar Bohra (Raichur Zone)

=== Notable past presidents ===
- J. C. Rollo (1933–1940s, inaugural president)
- S. A. Srinivasan (1961–1973)
- M. Chinnaswamy (1978–1990)
- K. Thimmappiah (1990–1998)
- K. M. Ramprasad (1998–2007)
- Srikantadatta Narasimharaja Wadiyar (2007–2010, 2013)
- Anil Kumble (2010–2013)
- P. R. Ashok Anand (2013–2016)
- Sanjay Desai (2016–2019)
- Roger Binny (2019–2022)
- Raghuram Bhat (2022–2025)
- Venkatesh Prasad (2025–present)

== Representative teams ==
The KSCA selects and manages Karnataka's representative squads across all BCCI domestic competitions:

- Men's senior team: The Karnataka cricket team competes in the Ranji Trophy, Vijay Hazare Trophy, and Syed Mushtaq Ali Trophy. Under KSCA administration, Karnataka has won eight Ranji Trophy titles (including consecutive domestic trebles in 2013–14 and 2014–15), five Vijay Hazare Trophy titles, and two Syed Mushtaq Ali Trophy titles.
- Women's senior team: The Karnataka women's cricket team participates in the Senior Women's One Day Trophy (winning the national title in 2023–24) and the Senior Women's T20 Trophy.
- Age-group teams: The association fields state squads in the Men's Under-23 (Col. C. K. Nayudu Trophy), Under-19 (Cooch Behar Trophy and Vinoo Mankad Trophy), Under-16 (Vijay Merchant Trophy), and Women's Under-23, Under-19, and Under-15 national championships.

== Notable players ==
Cricketers developed through the KSCA's club and zonal league system who have represented India or the India women's team in international cricket include:

=== Men ===
- Mayank Agarwal
- Stuart Binny
- Roger Binny
- Bhagwat Chandrasekhar
- Rahul Dravid
- Dodda Ganesh
- Shreyas Gopal
- Sunil Joshi
- Syed Kirmani
- Prasidh Krishna
- Vinay Kumar
- Anil Kumble
- Abhimanyu Mithun
- Karun Nair
- Devdutt Padikkal
- Manish Pandey
- Brijesh Patel
- Erapalli Prasanna
- Venkatesh Prasad
- KL Rahul
- Sudhakar Rao
- Javagal Srinath
- Robin Uthappa
- Gundappa Viswanath

=== Women ===
- Rajeshwari Gayakwad
- Karuna Jain
- Veda Krishnamurthy
- Mamatha Maben
- Shreyanka Patil
- Shantha Rangaswamy

== Coaching and officiating ==
The KSCA operates the KSCA Cricket Academy in Bengaluru alongside regional coaching centres across its seven zones to train junior cricketers, coaches, and support staff. The association also conducts annual certification examinations and refresher workshops for state-panel umpires, scorers, and pitch curators, nominating qualified officials for BCCI domestic and international panels.

== Governance reforms ==
Following the 2016 Supreme Court of India ruling on the Lodha Committee recommendations for cricket administration in India, the KSCA amended its memorandum of association and rules to align with BCCI governance norms. These reforms introduced a 70-year upper age limit for office bearers, mandatory cooling-off periods between consecutive terms, and a cumulative nine-year cap on holding administrative posts.

== See also ==
- Cricket in India
- Karnataka cricket team
- Karnataka women's cricket team
- Maharaja Trophy KSCA T20
- M. Chinnaswamy Stadium
