= Ramprakash =

Ramprakash may refer to:

- B. Ramprakash (born 1966), Indian cricketer
- Mark Ramprakash (born 1969), English cricketer
- Ramprakash Mehra (1917–1983), Indian cricketer and administrator
- Ramprakash Rayappa, director and writer of the Tamil films Tamizhuku En Ondrai Azhuthavum (2015) and Pokkiri Raja (2016)

== See also ==
- Ram Prakash (born 1939), Indian politician
