= Board of Control for Cricket in India =

National governing body of cricket in India

- Sport: Cricket
- Jurisdiction: India
- Membership: 38
- Abbreviation: BCCI
- Founded: 1928; 98 years ago
- Affiliation: International Cricket Council
- Affiliation date: 1926; 100 years ago
- Regional affiliation: Asian Cricket Council
- Headquarters: Cricket Centre, Wankhede Stadium, Churchgate, Mumbai, Maharashtra, India
- Location: Mumbai
- President: Mithun Manhas
- Vice president: Rajeev Shukla
- Secretary: Devajit Saikia
- Men's coach: Gautam Gambhir
- Women's coach: Amol Muzumdar
- Operating income: ₹18,700 crore (US$2.0 billion)
- Sponsor: Apollo Tyres; Adidas; Muthoot Fincorp; SBI Life; Campa Cola; Star Sports; JioHotstar; Asian Paints; ChatGPT

Official website
- bcci.tv
- (India)

The Board of Control for Cricket in India (BCCI) is the principal national governing body of the sport of cricket in India. Its headquarters are situated at the Cricket Centre in Churchgate, Mumbai. BCCI is the wealthiest governing body of cricket in the world. It has a revenue of more than ₹9,700 crore (US$1.0 billion).

It nurtures talent through grassroots programs and cricket academies. Its initiatives include coaching, infrastructure construction , and player welfare programs designed to maintain and enhance India's competitive performance internationally.

BCCI was established on 1 December 1928 in Madras under Act XXI of 1860 of Madras and was subsequently re-registered under the Tamil Nadu Societies Registration Act, 1975. It is a consortium of state cricket associations that select their representatives who elect the BCCI president. It joined the Imperial Cricket Conference in 1926 which later became the International Cricket Council. The BCCI is an autonomous, private organization that does not fall under the purview of the Government of India and does not receive any grants from the Ministry of Youth Affairs and Sports. The BCCI is influential in international cricket. The International Cricket Council shares the largest part of its revenue with the BCCI. Organized by the BCCI, the Indian Premier League (IPL) is one of the wealthiest sports leagues in the world.

In financial year 2023–2024, BCCI earned ₹18,700 crore (equivalent to ₹200 billion or US$2.1 billion in 2026). BCCI paid ₹4,298 crore (equivalent to ₹46 billion or US$490 million in 2026) in taxes for the financial year 2022–23. (Note: For detail information see #Tax payment.)

R. E. Grant Govan was the first BCCI president and Anthony De Mello was its first secretary.

BCCI has hosted multiple Cricket World Cups, (Note: It hosted the 1987, 1996, 2011 and 2023 Cricket World Cups, the 2006 Champions Trophy, the 2016 T20 World Cup, and the 2026 Men's T20 World Cup. In the context of women tournaments it also hosted 2013 Women's Cricket World Cup and the 2025 Women's Cricket World Cup.) It will also host the 2029 Champions Trophy and the 2031 Cricket World Cup. (Note: the 2031 Cricket World Cup is scheduled to take place in India, but Bangladesh will also serve as a co-host.)

The BCCI manages four squads that represent India in international cricket; the men's national cricket team, the women's national cricket team, the men's national under-19 cricket team and the women's national under-19 cricket team. It also governs the developmental squads; the India A team, the India B team and the India A women's team. Its national selection committee, which is led by the chief national selector, selects players for these teams. (Note: Senior national selection committee led by 'chief national selector' select players and skipper for India men's national cricket team, India A, B and president's XI teams, while Junior national selection committee of men's and women's selects players and skipper for 'India U19 team', India women's U19 team respectively.) As part of its duties, the BCCI organizes and schedules matches to be played by each of these teams and schedules, sanctions and organizes domestic cricket in India.

== History ==
The first game of cricket was played in India by European sailors, who played the sport as a recreational activity in the first half of the 18th century. These sailors played cricket near their coastal settlements. The first recorded match in India was played between the British army and British settlers in 1751. The world's second-oldest cricket club, Calcutta Cricket Club, was founded in 1792 in present-day Kolkata. The Parsis were the first civilian community to accept cricket as a sport and play it in India. In 1848, they set up the Oriental Cricket Club in present-day Mumbai. In 1850, they founded the Young Zoroastrian Cricket Club. In 1886, Hindus founded the Hindu Gymkhana sports club.

In 1912, an all-India cricket team visited England for the first time, and were sponsored and captained by the Maharaja of Patiala. In 1926, two representatives of Calcutta Cricket Club traveled to London to attend meetings of the Imperial Cricket Conference, the predecessor of the current International Cricket Council.

Although technically not an official representative of Indian cricket, they were allowed to attend by Lord Harris, chairman of the conference. The outcome of the meeting was the MCC's decision to send a team that was led by Arthur Gilligan, who had captained England in The Ashes, to India.

=== Founding and early years ===
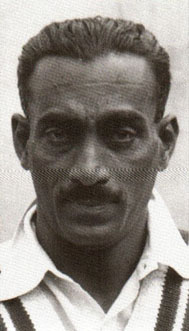
CK Nayudu (in the 1930s), former Indian cricketer, Indian cricket team's first captain in Test cricket

In a meeting with the Maharaja of Patiala, Bhupinder Singh, and others, Gilligan promised to press for its inclusion in the ICC if all of the game's promoters in the country united to establish a single controlling body. After Gilligan gave assurance on 21 November 1927, a meeting was held in Delhi, which was attended by delegates from Patiala, Delhi, United Provinces of Agra and Oudh, Rajputana, Alwar, Bhopal, Gwalior, Baroda, Kathiawar, Central Provinces and Berar, Sindh and Punjab. The delegates agreed to create a board for control of cricket in India. On 10 December 1927, a unanimous decision to form a provisional board of control was taken, and the BCCI was formed in December 1928. R. E. Grant Govan was elected as its first president and Anthony de Mello was secretary.

In 1926, the BCCI joined the Imperial Cricket Council, then the governing body for international cricket. In 1936, the BCCI started India's premier first-class cricket championship the Ranji Trophy, which was named after the first Indian person who played international cricket, the King of Nawanagar state K.S. Ranjitsinhji, who played for England in international cricket. The Mumbai cricket team is the most-successful team, winning 42 titles.

In 1932, India played its maiden Test match under the captaincy of C. K. Nayudu against England at Lord's cricket ground in London. During England's 1933-34 tour of India, on 17 December 1933, Lala Amarnath became the first Indian batsman to score a test century, scoring 118 on his debut, at Bombay Gymkhana. In 1967–68, India won its first-ever Test cricket series outside Asia. Previously it had defeated Pakistan, New Zealand and England, and won series in India.

=== 1945–1987 ===
In 1952, the England team toured India; it was their first tour of India after its Independence. Nigel Howard was the captain of touring team. The former India captain Vijaya Ananda Gajapathi Raju, also known as Vizzy, was the BCCI president in the 1960s.

In 1975, the BCCI paid ₹2,500 per match to the test cricketers. Banks, Indian railways and private enterprises would recruit players.

The board appointed Ajit Wadekar captain in 1971, the Indian team won their first test series against England on English soil, and against the West Indies, Sunil Gavaskar made his test debut in latter series.

India won the 1983 Cricket World Cup, defeating the defending champions the West Indies by 43 runs in the final at Lord's. India also won the World Championship of Cricket in 1985, defeating Pakistan by eight wickets in the final at Melbourne Cricket Ground. The BCCI hosted the 1987 World Cup; it was the first time the event was organized outside England.

=== 1987–2000 ===
Through the 1980s and early 1990s, BCCI paid ₹5 lakh per match to terrestrial television network Doordarshan to broadcast the Indian cricket team's matches.

It hosted the ICC Cricket World Cup competitions in 1987 and 1996. (Note: Sri Lanka–Pakistan co-hosted 1996 ODI ICC Cricket world cup with India.)

In 1991, BCCI proposed South Africa's readmission to international cricket at the International Cricket Council (ICC). After the proposal succeeded, the BCCI sold television broadcast rights for the first time; South African Broadcasting Corporation purchased the rights to broadcast the South African cricket tour of India, South Africa's first official international tour after the 21-year boycott from international cricket. During this time, South Africa joined the "Asian bloc" of the BCCI and its South-Asian neighbours.

In 1993, the BCCI signed a deal with TransWorld International (TWI), which would pay the BCCI to televise England's tour of India on satellite television and Doordarshan would pay TWI for the rights to televise the matches in India. The 1993 Hero Cup was broadcast on Star TV, which made it the first cricket series to be broadcast on satellite television in India and broke the monopoly of Doordarshan. A lengthy legal battle between Doordarshan and the BCCI—which was led by Jagmohan Dalmiya and president I. S. Bindra—ensued. In February 1995, the Supreme Court of India ruled the television rights of India's matches were a commodity belonging to the BCCI, for which the broadcaster must pay BCCI and not the other way around.

BCCI, in a joint bid with Pakistan and Sri Lanka, won the rights to host the 1996 Cricket World Cup, defeating the England-and-Australia bloc. The tournament was a commercial success, yielding the ICC a profit of $50 million.

In 1997, Dalmiya became the president of the ICC. With Dalmiya at the head of the ICC, the BCCI led a successful proposal to grant Test status to Bangladesh in 1999–2000.

=== 21st century ===
Since 2000, the BCCI has hosted and organized multiple ICC cricket World Cups competitions that is men's 2011 ODI world cup, (Note: Bangladesh and Sri Lanka served as Co-host with India.) the 2023 ODI world cup, the 2016 T20 world cup, the 2006 ICC Champions Trophy and 2021 T20 world cups; (Note: 2021 ICC T20 world cup was scheduled to take place in India but it was moved to UAE due to COVID-19 outbreak in India but hosting rights and commercial benefits remained with India's BCCI.) 2013, 2016 Women's Cricket world cups.

In 2007, the BCCI established the Indian Premier League (IPL), an annual, franchise-based, Twenty20 cricket league. In 2008, the BCCI sold the ownership rights of eight city-based franchises to corporate groups and Bollywood celebrities in a closed auction for a total of US$723.49 million; it also sold the tournament's global media rights for 10 years to World Sport Group for US$1.03 billion. The media deal was re-negotiated the following year to $1.6 billion. In 2010, the BCCI expanded the league to 10 teams, selling two new franchises for a total of US$703 million. Due to the IPL's commercial success, similarly styled Twenty20 leagues appeared around the world, as did franchise-based leagues in other sports in India. A rebel league, Indian Cricket League (ICL) was owned and operated by Essel Group. BCCI banned Indian players who played in the ICL, including Hemang Badani, Dinesh Mongia, Rohan Gavaskar and Ambati Rayudu, but later gave amnesty to these players and lifted theirs bans after they ended their ties with the ICL. The BCCI blacklisted Essel Group company Zee Entertainment Enterprises due to this league, and expelled it from the BCCI in 2021. Zee was prohibited from buying BCCI's media rights. In 2006, the BCCI sold the Indian cricket team's media rights to Zee for the 2006-11 period but after Essel Group initiated the ICL, the BCCI terminated this deal. Zee fought a long legal battle with the BCCI; on 12 March 2018, a tribunal headed by three judges found BCCI guilty and asked them to pay Zee ₹140 crores for losses. The tribunal found blacklisting of Zee by BCCI was illegal and said in judgement; "To us it seems that BCCI was exploiting its dominating position in respect of game of cricket in India" and also added Zee and its affiliated companies to the blacklist and banning them from participating in the BCCI bidding process was illegal.

Nimbus Communications served as the official broadcaster for the Board of Control for Cricket in India (BCCI) from 2006 to 2010. Nimbus broadcast matches through its dedicated channels, Neo Sports and Neo Cricket. Although the company originally acquired the broadcasting rights for $612 million, it only paid $549 million. In 2010, Nimbus also secured the rights for the subsequent broadcasting cycle. However, following a financial dispute between the BCCI and Nimbus regarding outstanding payments, the board officially terminated the contract.

In January 2010, the Pakistan Cricket Board criticized the BCCI and organizers of the IPL over the absence of Pakistani players, after the Pakistani cricketers were not selected in auctions from the second season in 2009 and third season in 2010. Media reports attributed the continued absence of Pakistani players to security concerns and geopolitical tensions following the November 2008 terror attacks in Mumbai, which were carried out by Lashkar-e-Taiba, a Pakistan-based militant group.

The BCCI does not allow its contracted, non-contracted, national and domestic players to participate in any cricket leagues abroad. Only players who have retired from all formats of Indian cricket can take part in foreign leagues. Players such as Adam Gilchrist have questioned this policy. Indian players such as Suresh Raina and Robin Uthappa have urged the board to allow non-contracted players like them to participate in foreign leagues.

India Cements-Chennai Super Kings owner and former president N. Srinivasan was criticised for his alleged biased behaviour towards some state boards by awarding them ODI, Test and T20I matches while in office, possibly in violation of the board's rotation policy on venues. During Srinivasan's tenure as treasurer in BCCI before he became the president, the board constitution was amended to facilitate him to buy an IPL franchise, through his company India Cements during the 2008 IPL team auction (an event held where 8 teams was sold through an open auction). Srinivasan courted further controversy for appointing India national side's and Chennai Super Kings' (CSK) captain Mahendra Singh Dhoni as a vice-president of India Cements. He also interfered in national team's selection, in 2012 ex-BCCI selector Mohinder Amarnath revealed that selectors wanted to sack Dhoni from skipper post, after India lost 8 test in a row, including "disastrous series in Australia", they wanted to replace him, it was a unanimous decision by selectors, but Srinivasan didn't allow it to happen. Srinivasan's son-in-law Gurunath Meiyappan, who was team principal of CSK, was arrested for involvement in Spot-fixing and betting. Then unrecognised state association by BCCI, the Bihar Cricket Association, filed a petition against it for mismanagement and conflict of interest in its investigation of 2013 IPL corruption scandal. In 2013, Mumbai police arrested the Indian cricket team's regular player S. Sreesanth, other players and IPL team owners of Chennai Super Kings and Rajasthan Royals for their dealings with the illegal betting industry. In 2015, Supreme Court of India appointed a committee to make reforms in BCCI, headed by justice R. M. Lodha, the Lodha Committee suspended CSK from the IPL for two years and suspended Meiyappan from cricket activities for life but many other suggested were not implemented by the BCCI and as a result the Supreme Court removed BCCI officials. In 2013, Rupa Gurunath—N Shrinivasan's daughter and Gurunath Meiyappan's wife—who was then president of Tamil Nadu Cricket Association, was found guilty of conflict of interest by the BCCI's ethics officer Justice D. K. Jain. In 2015, the Supreme Court of India barred Srinivasan from the BCCI for contesting elections due to his conflict of interests; the court also struck down the amendments of BCCI constitution that had allowed him to own and operate an IPL team. However he still owns the CSK franchise. In January 2015, Supreme court quashed BCCI's rule, which allowed its administrators to have financial interests in cash rich leagues such as Championship league, IPL etc. The court barred individuals, including N. Shrinivasan, from BCCI election, who have financial interests in events organized by BCCI. On 30 January 2017, The Supreme Court of India nominated a four-member 'Committee of Administrators' (COA) composed of Vinod Rai, Ramachandra Guha, Vikram Limaye and Diana Edulji to administer the BCCI to implement Lodha Committee's reforms. Vinod Rai, a retired civil servant and the former Comptroller and Auditor General of India, led the committee, which administered the board until elections could be conducted.

In 2014, the BCCI, Cricket Australia and the England and Wales Cricket Board seized control of several of the ICC's key committees to form the "Big Three". The foundation of the "Big Three" would result in a complete remodelling of world cricket, with India, England, and Australia now commanding most of cricket's revenue for the foreseeable future.

In May 2017, the Pakistan Cricket Board (PCB) sent a legal notice and a compensation claim of US$60 million to the BCCI after bilateral series agreed through a 2014 Memorandum of Understanding did not take place, six of which were scheduled between 2015 and 2023. The ICC Dispute Resolution Committee conducted a three-day hearing and concluded that the agreement was not binding and that the PCB's compensation claim was unproven, ruling in favor of the BCCI.

In 2019, the BCCI recognised retired players' union, the Indian Cricketers' Association (ICA), which was formed after the Supreme court appointed Lodha Committee's recommendation to form an independent organisation for welfare of nation's players. The board also includes this union's one person as "ICA representative" in BCCI and IPL's apex governing council.

In 2021 BCCI sacked Virat Kohli from ODI captaincy, then President Ganguly told media that the BCCI asked him to remain captain but Kohli was not interested. After which Kohli took a press conference and contradicted him (Ganguly), revealing that BCCI did not ask him to remain captain. In February 2023, in a sting operation of Zee News, then chief national selector Chetan Sharma, made shocking revelations, accusing Kohli of lying and in fact president Ganguly had told him to remain as captain, in a meeting in front of all the selectors. According to Sharma, Virat Kohli was considering himself bigger than BCCI and wanted to teach a lesson to the president of the BCCI. He also revealed that after Kohli resigned from T20 captaincy, BCCI decided to sack him from ODI captaincy as well because they did not want two separate captains for limited overs format.

BCCI's headquarters is called the "Cricket Centre" and is situated on the premises of Wankhede Stadium in Churchgate, Mumbai. Prior to moving there in 2006, the board's headquarters was located in a 500-square-foot area on the first floor of Brabourne Stadium at the Cricket Club of India from 1948 to 2006. In 2023, the BCCI renovated the Cricket Centre, which now occupies the first, second, and fourth floors of the building.

On 14 February 2022, it laid foundation stone for new National Cricket Academy (NCA) at Bengaluru, which will replace old NCA located near M. Chinnaswamy Stadium, Bengaluru. Inaugurated in September 2024, this facility is named as the 'BCCI Centre of Excellence' (BCE). It replaced the NCA. The new facility is spread in 40 acres utilized for the training and rehabilitation of injured players, and its grounds are also used for hosting domestic matches. It features three international-standard cricket grounds, a gymnasium, accommodations, and both indoor and outdoor training facilities equipped with 40 pitches.

== National teams ==
Men's Test team: India played their first Test match against England in 1932 and has since become one of the most dominant teams in Test cricket. India has been a full member of the International Cricket Council (ICC) since its inception in 1909. As of June 2025, the position of Men's Test captain is held by Shubman Gill.

Men's white-ball team: India played their first One-Day International against England in 1974, and their first Twenty20 International against South Africa in 2006. India won the Men's Cricket World Cup for the first time in 1983 and secured their second title in 2011. India won the first Men's T20 World Cup in 2007, followed by winning their second title in 2024 and a record third title in 2026. India won the Men's Champions Trophy, a record three times, in 2002, 2013 and 2025. India has also won the Men's Asia Cup, a record nine times, in 1984, 1988, 1990–91, 1995, 2010, 2016, 2018, 2023 and 2025. In addition, India have also won golds at the Asian Games in 2022 and 2026. As of June 2025, the position of Men's ODI captain is held by Shubman Gill and the position of Men's T20I captain is held by Shreyas Iyer.

Women's team: India played their first Women's Test match against West Indies in 1976, and their first Women's One-Day International and Women's Twenty20 International against England in 1978 and 2006 respectively. India won the Women's Cricket World Cup for the first time in 2025. India has also won the Women's Asia Cup, a record eight times, in 2004, 2005–06, 2006, 2008, 2012, 2016, 2022 and 2026. In addition, India have also won golds at the Asian Games in 2022 and 2026, and won a silver at the Commonwealth Games in 2022. As of October 2026, the position of Women's team captain is held by Smriti Mandhana.

Under-19 teams: India men's under-19 and India women's under-19 teams regularly compete in the Under-19 Cricket World Cups, and have won the World Cups, a record six and a record two times respectively. The men's under-19 team has also won the Under-19 Asia Cup, a record eight times in 1989, 2003, 2012, 2013–14, 2016, 2018, 2019, and 2021. Also, the women's under-19 team won the Under-19 Women's Asia Cup in 2024. The most recent captains as of 2025 are Ayush Mhatre and Niki Prasad respectively.

Reserves' teams: India A is the second-tier men's team, focusing on developing players and providing them with exposure through tours and warm-up matches. The team plays in various formats to prepare players for the senior team. Similarly, India A women's is the second-tier women's team, and India B is the third-tier men's team.

Disability teams: The BCCI is committed to growing cricket opportunities for people with disabilities in India. They govern the Physical Disability team, the Learning Disability team, the Visually Impaired team, and the Deaf team.

== Administration ==
=== Constitution ===
The BCCI is governed by its constitution. The board has been prohibited by the Supreme Court of India from amending its own constitution without its approval.

=== Headquarters ===
The BCCI's headquarters is located at the Cricket Centre within the premises of the Wankhede Stadium in Churchgate, Mumbai.

=== Legal status ===
BCCI is registered as a society in Tamil Nadu under the societies registration act, is an autonomous body and does not receive any grants or funding from the Indian government. In 2004, in the Supreme Court of India, the BCCI stated that the Indian cricket team is the official team of BCCI and not the official team of India and it does not fly the national flag or uses any national emblem in the activities of the board. The BCCI recommends its players for prestigious awards such as the Arjuna award but says it is not a national sports federation. Since its foundation, the BCCI has not been officially sanctioned by Government of India and after being started as a national governing body of cricket in India, it is the sole representative of India in International Cricket Council.

=== Logo ===
The BCCI's logo is derived from the Star of India emblem. According to Information Commissioner Sridhar Acharyulu, the logo was designed by the Government of India in 1928. It is 90% similar to the Star of India. The BCCI was alleged to use old official government emblem without prior permission from Government of India and it is an offence under the Emblems and Names (Prevention of Improper Use) Act, 1950.

=== National teams ===
The BCCI manages four squads that represent India in international cricket; the men's national cricket team, the women's national cricket team, the men's national under-19 cricket team and the women's national under-19 cricket team. It also governs the developmental squads; the India A team, the India B team and the India A women's team. Shubman Gill is the Test and ODI captain of the Indian men's national cricket team. Shreyas Iyer is the T20 captain of the Indian men's national cricket team. Smriti Mandhanais the captain of the Indian women's national cricket team. India men's national cricket team won the 1983 and 2011 Cricket World Cups, and the 2007, 2024 and 2026 T20 World Cups. They have also won the Champions Trophy, a record three times, in 2002, 2013 and 2025. India women's national cricket team have won the 2025 Women's Cricket World Cup. India men's national under-19 cricket team won the Under-19 Cricket World Cup a record six times, in 2000, 2008, 2012, 2018, 2022 and 2026. Also the India women's national under-19 cricket team won the Under-19 Women's T20 Cricket World Cup for two times, in 2023 and 2025.

=== Anti-corruption unit ===
The BCCI has a special anti-corruption unit that is responsible for preventing malpractice in cricket within India. This unit is responsible for investigating unlawful activities such as betting, spot-fixing, match-fixing and corrupt approaches to players. Shabir Hussein has been the head of this unit since April 2021.

==== Ethics officer ====
Former Indian Supreme Court judge Vineet Saran is the BCCI's incumbent ethics officer and ombudsman. He was appointed in June 2022. The board created this ethics officer post in 2017 due to increasing complaints of conflict of interest in the board's office holders, employees and associated people. The officer reviews complaints of conflict of interest.

==== Anti-doping unit ====
Dr. Abhijit Salvi is the head of BCCI's anti-doping unit. NADA sends qualified doctors to collect blood and urine sample of players and later analyse it in lab to find out performance-enhancing drugs or steroids in blood. After that BCCI takes appropriate actions if found doing violations.

For many years the BCCI consistently opposed to adhere regulations of the National Anti-Doping Agency, India (NADA). On 9 August 2019, it agreed to adhere the anti-doping mechanisms governed by the NADA. Former chief national selector Chetan Sharma has alleged that lots of Indian players take injections to expedite their return in the national team despite being 80 to 85% fit.

=== Television production ===
In 2012, the BCCI established its own production house. The BCCI's broadcast service produces coverage of international matches of the Indian national cricket team those held in India and matches of leading domestic tournaments including the IPL. Until 2012, the BCCI paid the production costs to the company who purchased the media rights from them. Nimbus Communications did production for the BCCI for many years. The BCCI's production house holds production rights and copyrights of Indian cricket's content. The BCCI broadcasts video highlights of domestic and bilateral cricket series in India on its website. Starting in July 2023, it will broadcast live, important domestic games form tournaments such as Duleep Trophy and Deodhar Trophy on its website.

=== Officials ===
Politicians from multiple political parties have held positions within BCCI; Sharad Pawar of the Nationalist Congress Party, Madhavrao Scindia of the Indian National Congress and Anurag Thakur of Bharatiya Janata Party (BJP) were BCCI presidents, As of 2023, latter's brother Arun Singh Dhumal is the IPL chairman. Jay Shah, the son of the Home Minister of India Amit Shah, is BCCI's secretary. Rajiv Shukla of the Congress party is its vice-president, he is in BCCI continuously since the 2000s and held various top positions, he was IPL president from 2011 to 2017. Ashish Shelar of BJP is the treasurer.

==== President ====
President is an elected position, and is considered the most-powerful position in the BCCI administration. Due to the president's financial power and the popularity of cricket in India, it is considered as a highly prestigious position. The President of the BCCI presides over the meeting of the apex council and the general body. He signs audited annual accounts and financial statements.

The full-member state boards can vote in the presidential election. Gujarat and Maharashtra have more than one full member but as per the Lodha Committee, supreme court guidelines state any state can have only one vote in the election at any time.

Former Indian cricketer Mithun Manhas is the incumbent President of the BCCI. He succeeded Roger Binny.

==== Secretary ====
'BCCI secretary' is the second most powerful and important post after president. Secretary signs all the contracts and carries correspondence on behalf of BCCI. Jay Shah was the incumbent secretary till 30 November 2024 as he took charge as the Chairman of the International Cricket Council on 1 December 2024 succeeding Greg Barclay. The secretary have power to take action or defend office bearers, employees of the BCCI. Shah was also the president of the Asian Cricket Council until 2024.

==== National selectors ====
National selectors are responsible for selecting national men's senior team. It also select male junior teams India A and India B, which represent India in second-and-third tiers of international cricket. The selection committee is composed of five former cricketers from five different zones of the country, Shivasundar Das, Sridharan Sharath, Salil Ankola and Subroto Banerjee are its present members. Chief selector's position is vacant as of 22 May 2023 BCCI's junior national selection committee selects players for junior teams such as India U19 and U15 men. Sharath Sridharan is its chairman since 17 September 2021.

BCCI gives chief national selector ₹1.25 crore per year for his job.

The All India women's selection committee selects players for Indian female cricket team. It consists of five female former players from five zones of the nation, who have represented India at international level. As of 2020, former left-arm spinner Neetu David is the head of this committee since her appointment on 26 September 2020. The committee consists of Neetu David (head), Aarti Vaidya, Renu Margrate, Mithu Mukharjee, Venkatechar Kalpana.

==== Cricket Advisory Committee ====
This committee has three members. CAC is responsible for selecting head coach for men's and women's national senior team.

== Past office bearers ==
=== Presidents ===
The following is a list of presidents of BCCI:

No.	Image	President	Term
1		R. E. Grant Govan	1928–33
2		Sikandar Hayat Khan	1933–35
3		Hamidullah Khan	1935–37
4		K. S. Digvijaysinhji	1937–38
5		P. Subbarayan	1938–46
6		Anthony de Mello	1946–51
7		J. C. Mukherji	1951–54
8		Maharajkumar of Vizianagram	1954–56
9		Surjit Singh Majithia	1956–58
10		R. K. Patel	1958–60
11		M. A. Chidambaram	1960–63
12		Fatehsinghrao Gaekwad	1963–66
13		Zal Irani	1966–69
14		A. N. Ghose	1969–72
15		Purshottam M. Rungta	1972–75
16		Ramprakash Mehra	1975–77
17		M. Chinnaswamy	1977–80
18		S. K. Wankhede	1980–82
19		N. K. P. Salve	1982–85
20		S. Sriraman	1985–88
21		Biswanath Dutt	1988–90
22		Madhavrao Scindia	1990–93
23		I. S. Bindra	1993–96
24		Raj Singh Dungarpur	1996–99
25		A. C. Muthiah	1999–2001
26		Jagmohan Dalmiya	2001–04
27		Ranbir Singh Mahendra	2004–05
28		Sharad Pawar	2005–08
29		Shashank Manohar	2008–11
30		N. Srinivasan	2011–13^{[RES]}
(26)		Jagmohan Dalmiya (Interim)	2013
(30)		N. Srinivasan	2013–14^{[§]}
31		Shivlal Yadav (Interim)	2014
32		Sunil Gavaskar (Interim)	2014
(26)		Jagmohan Dalmiya	2015^{[†]}
(29)		Shashank Manohar^{[RES]}	2015–16
33		Anurag Thakur	2016–17^{[§]}
34		C. K. Khanna (Interim)	2017–19
35		Sourav Ganguly	2019–22
36		Roger Binny	2022–2025
37		Mithun Manhas	2025–present

=== Honorary Secretaries ===
The following is a list of secretaries of BCCI:

No.	Image	Honorary Secretary	Term
1		Anthony de Mello^{[β]}	1928–38
2		K. S. Ranga Rao	1938–46
3		Pankaj Gupta	1946–48
4		M. G. Bhave	1948–51
5		A. N. Ghose^{[β]}	1951–60
6		M. Chinnaswamy^{[β]}	1960–65
7		S. Sriraman	1965–70
8		M.V. Chandgadkar	1970–75
9		Ghulam Ahmed	1975–80
10		A.W. Kanmadikar	1980–85
11		Ranbir Singh Mahendra^{[β]}	1985–90
12		Jagmohan Dalmiya^{[β]}	1990–91^{[RES]}
13		C. Nagaraj	1991–93
14		Jagmohan Dalmiya^{[β]}	1993–97
15		Jaywant Y. Lele	1997–99
16		Niranjan S. Shah	1999–2003
17		S. K. Nair	2003–04
18		Niranjan S. Shah	2004–08
19		N. Srinivasan^{[β]}	2008–11
20		Sanjay Jagdale	2011–13
21		Sanjay Patel	2013–15
22		Anurag Thakur^{[β]}	2015–16
23		Ajay Shirke	2016–17^{[§]}
24		Amitabh Choudhary	2017–19
25		Jay Shah	2019–2024
26		Devajit Saikia	2024–present

Key

- ^{†} Died in office
- ^{§} Sacked or removed from office
- ^{RES} Resigned
- ^{β} Later become President

== Finance ==
=== Earnings ===
The BCCI is a private entity; it does not depend on the Government of India for its finances. In 2020, with US$405 million out of US$1,534 million, India had 26% share in the ICC FTP income disbursed to 10 Test playing nations, while the England and Wales Cricket Board received US$139 million as the second-highest earner. In the same year, to refinance other boards after the global economic decline and the significantly reduced income of most boards due to the COVID-19 pandemic, the ICC changed its FTP schedule to organise more international matches with India.

ICC will share 38.5% of its total annual income with BCCI from 2023 to 2027, the board could earn $1.15 bn plus in this cycle. BCCI will receive biggest share of ICC's income than any other board.

=== Income ===
In financial year (FY) 2019–2020, the BCCI's total annual income was estimated to be over ₹3,730 crore (US$535 million), including ₹2,500 crore (US$345 million) from the IPL, ₹950 crore (US$139 million) from bilateral cricket with other nations, and ₹380 crore (US$51 million per year or total US$405 million for eight years) from India's share of ICC revenue. In financial year 2021-2022 the BCCI earned ₹4542 Cr, in FY 2022-2023 earned ₹6558 Cr.

==== ICC Income share ====
In 2020, as per the present eight-year Future Tours Program (FTP), India receives US$405 million from the ICC, as contrasted with US$139 million to the England and Wales Cricket Board, while US$128 million for each of Cricket Australia, Cricket South Africa, Pakistan Cricket Board, New Zealand Cricket, Sri Lanka Cricket, Cricket West Indies and Bangladesh Cricket Board, and US$94 million for Zimbabwe.

In FY 2023–2027, ICC going to share 38.5% of its annual revenue with the BCCI.

==== Media rights ====
On 16 January 2023, the board sold the WPL's media rights in ₹951 crore (equivalent to ₹10 billion or US$110 million in 2026) for the period of 2023–2027 to Viacom18.

On 31 August 2023, Viacom18 has acquired the media rights of "India cricket" as a result Viacom18 has exclusive rights to broadcast all the bilateral matches of India national women's–men's cricket team's which will take place in India and right to air all the domestic tournaments such as Ranji Trophy, Vijay Hazare Trophy, Irani Cup, Duleep Trophy and many more. The ₹5,963 crores deal will last from Sept 2023 to March 2028.

The IPL is the BCCI's largest source of income by medium of media rights. From 2018 to 2022, global rights were awarded to Star India for ₹16,347.5 crore (US$2.0 billion). In 2022, BCCI sold IPL media rights for a staggering ₹48,390 crore (equivalent to ₹510 billion or US$6.4 billion in 2023), comprising television rights of ₹23,575 crore and digital rights of ₹20,500 crore, which were won by Disney and Viacom18 respectively. This deal includes 410 matches from 2023 to 2027. Viacom 18 won the exclusive digital rights for the Indian subcontinent and for streaming to the UK, Australia, New Zealand and South Africa; while Times Internet won global streaming rights in the Middle East, North Africa and the United States. Due to this deal, the IPL became the second-richest league in the world behind National Football League (NFL).

History of BCCI's media rights

In 2018, satellite broadcaster Star India won the BCCI's exclusive media rights from 2018 to 2023. Star India won the rights to broadcast the Indian cricket team's matches on their television channels, and the rights to broadcast on Disney+ Hotstar for ₹6,138.10 crore.

On average, Star Sports pays ₹60.1 crore per match to the BCCI. The deal also include rights to broadcast men's domestic tournaments such as the Vijay Hazare Trophy, Ranji Trophy, Irani Cup, Duleep Trophy and Syed Mushtaq Ali Trophy; and women's international cricket matches in India on Star Sport and Disney+ Hotstar.

==== Sponsorship rights ====
Apollo Tyres is the current team sponsor of National Cricket team (2025–2027). Viacom18's Sports18 TV channel and its OTT platform JioCinema is the current (2023–2027) official broadcaster of the BCCI. Adidas is kit sponsor (since June 2023), September 2023 onwards IDFC First Bank is title sponsor for all the bilateral series in India and for all the domestic tournaments, excluding the IPL and Women's Premier League because their title sponsor is TATA for 2022–23 season. Campa, Ambuja and Hyundai are official partners.

==== Ticketing rights ====
BCCI sold IPL 2022 ticket-selling rights to Book My Show. The deal includes management of spectator entry at stadium gates. Paytm Insider app also often sells bilateral series' tickets.

=== Expenditure ===
==== Match fees paid by the BCCI ====
===== Men's International Cricket =====
Format	Match Fee
Test Match	₹15,00,000
ODI Match	₹6,00,000
T20I Match	₹3,00,000

===== Women's International Cricket =====
Format	Match Fee
Test Match	₹15,00,000
ODI Match	₹6,00,000
T20I Match	₹3,00,000

===== Men's Domestic Cricket =====
Format	Match Fee
Ranji Trophy (41+ matches)	₹240,000 per match
Ranji Trophy (21–40 matches)	₹200,000 per match
Ranji Trophy (less than 20 matches)	₹160,000 per match
Vijay Hazare Trophy	₹25,000–₹60,000 per match (based on experience)
Syed Mushtaq Ali Trophy	₹20,000–₹50,000 per match (based on experience)
Duleep Trophy	₹14,000 per match

===== Women's Domestic Cricket =====
Format	Match Fee
Senior Women's Domestic (ODI & T20)	₹30,000 per match
Women's Under-23 (ODI)	₹20,000 per match

===== Men's Youth Cricket =====
Format	Match Fee
Under-19 (ODI & T20)	₹10,000 per match
Under-23 (ODI & T20)	₹15,000 per match

===== Women's Youth Cricket =====
Format	Match Fee
Under-19 (ODI & T20)	₹5,000 per match
Under-23 (ODI & T20)	₹10,000 per match

===== Indian Premier League (IPL) =====
Category	Match Fee
Playing XI (per match)	₹7,50,000
Full league season (14 matches)	₹1,05,00,000
Team match-fee pool (per season)	₹12.60 crore

==== Cricketing infrastructure development ====
On 12 September 2006, the BCCI announced it would spend ₹1,600 crore over the next year to upgrade cricket stadiums in India.

In the early 2000s, it established the National Cricket Academy at Bangalore to train future cricketers. On 17 February 2022, the BCCI president Sourav Ganguly founded a new NCA facility at Bangalore, which occupies 40 acres (16 ha) of land near an airport. On completion, it will have three cricket grounds, 40 practice pitches, residential rooms, a swimming pool and a gymnasium. Construction will cost ₹200 crore.

On 12 September 2006, the BCCI announced it would spend ₹1,600 crore over the next year to upgrade cricket stadiums in India.

In the early 2000s, it established the National Cricket Academy (NCA) at Bangalore to train future cricketers. On 17 February 2022, the BCCI president Sourav Ganguly founded a new NCA facility at Bangalore, which occupies 40 acres (16 ha) of land near an airport. On completion, it will have three cricket grounds, 40 practice pitches, residential rooms, a swimming pool and a gymnasium. Construction will cost ₹200 crore.

In September 2024, the BCCI inaugurated the new National Cricket Academy in Bengaluru, now called the BCCI Centre of Excellence. The facility spans 40 acres and includes three international-standard cricket grounds, 86 practice pitches, a 16,000 square-foot gymnasium, advanced sports science and rehabilitation centers including Jacuzzis, underwater therapy pools, and recovery labs.

Ahead of the ICC Men's Cricket World Cup 2023, the BCCI initiated Phase 1 of a nationwide stadium upgrade plan. Major renovations included ₹127.47 crore for Eden Gardens (Kolkata), ₹117.17 crore for Rajiv Gandhi Stadium (Hyderabad), ₹100 crore for Arun Jaitley Stadium (Delhi), ₹79.46 crore for PCA Stadium (Mohali), and ₹78.82 crore for Wankhede Stadium (Mumbai).

In May 2024, the BCCI laid the foundation stone for a state-of-the-art indoor training facility in the North East India to serve cricketers from Arunachal Pradesh, Manipur, Meghalaya, Mizoram, Nagaland, and Sikkim. This facility will include indoor nets, swimming pools, and modern fitness centers.

==== Stadium security ====
The BCCI hires police for security and crowd control in arenas during IPL, bilateral and ICC tournaments, unlike Australian or English cricket boards who hire private security agencies. In Maharashtra from June 2023 onwards they have to pay ₹35, ₹50, ₹60 lakhs for Test, ODI and T20 per game respectively to the Maharashtra government. (Note: In India state police forces comes under their state governments.)

==== Donations ====
In March 2020, BCCI President Sourav Ganguly announced a donation of ₹51 crore to the PM CARES Fund to combat the COVID-19 pandemic. In May 2021, the media reported that the BCCI would donate 2,000 10-litre (2.2 imp gal; 2.6 US gal) Oxygen concentrators to help India fight COVID.

In 2021, the BCCI announced, it will donate ₹10 Cr to Olympic bound Indian contingent.

In August 2023, it paid ₹2.25 crore (equivalent to ₹2.5 crore or US$260,000 in 2026) to the Constitution Club of India based in New Delhi, to buy gym equipment. The club is an exclusive club for members of parliament of India.

==== Encouragement to other sports ====
BCCI announced rewards to the Indian olympians who won medals at the Tokyo Olympics.

==== Contracts ====
The BCCI created four grades for contracted male players—A+, A, B and C; and three grades for contracted female players—A, B and C. Male players who are in A+ grade get ₹7 crore a year. Players of A-grade get ₹5 crore, B-grade's players get ₹3 crore and C-grade players receive ₹1 crore per year. Female players who are in A grade get ₹50 lakh a year, B-grade players get ₹30 lakh a year and C-grade players get ₹10 lakh a year.

As per new changes made in February 2026, only three players are placed in Grade A - Shubman Gill, Jasprit Bumrah, and Ravindra Jadeja.

==== Pension schemes ====
The BCCI gives pensions to former domestic and international players who played for India. On 31 December 1993 BCCI decided to give ₹50,000 pension to the players, who played more than 25 International Test match for the nation. The board gives ₹15,000 pensions to the players who played in the Ranji Trophy before the 1957-to-1958 season. In 2013, the BCCI gave one-time benefits to domestic players who played in more than 75 first-class matches. For female cricketers, the board give a ₹22,500-per-month pension to players who played 10 or more Tests for India; and ₹15,000 per month for those who played between five and nine Tests.

==== Insurance ====
The BCCI has taken insurance for nearly everything related to them; they covered health insurance of their employees, they have insured international and domestic players for loss of fees due to injury, matches, their old office and new office at the Wankhede stadium and IPL matches. In case of cancellation of IPL, domestic and international cricket matches due to poor weather, riot, or fire. The BCCI receives payments from insurance companies. The BCCI provides ₹5 lakh insurance to players who played under the board.

=== Tax payments ===
In 2018, ₹472.22 crore of tax was outstanding till 1 April 2018, this sum was cleared along with interest in September 2018. However the Department of Revenue issued a notice for tax evasion to the BCCI, they also demanded the BCCI for another outstanding income-tax payment of ₹1,303 crore; according to details submitted by the Ministry of finance in the Parliament in February 2019.

Since IPL began Income Tax Department (IT department) refused to give income tax exemption for IPL, said it is an annual commercial activity. Since financial year 2007–2008 to 2017–2018, BCCI paid ₹3,500 crore to IT department, out of around ₹12000 Cr it earned from the IPL. In 2007–08, although the IT department withdrew this exemption, BCCI only paid tax amounting to ₹41.9 crore (US$4.5 million) against its tax liability of ₹413 crore (US$44 million) in the 2009–2010 financial year

In 2012, BCCI paid no income tax, claimed they are a charitable organisation.

In 2015, then Finance minister Jayant Sinha said, ministry collected ₹2140.58 Cr from BCCI, 2004–05 onwards, but tax payment still pending, 53 Cr is from assessment year 2008–09, ₹100 Cr from 2010 to 11, ₹100 Cr from 2011 to 12, ₹116.89 Cr of year 2012–13 from BCCI. In 2014–15, the BCCI paid ₹864.78 Cr income tax by leaving outstanding tax of ₹462.52 Cr, which income tax department want from it, also demanded ₹400 Cr from FY 2015–16.

BCCI has avoided paying taxes to the government on numerous occasions. One such instance was when it claimed itself to be a "charitable organisation", to avoid paying taxes and often disguises itself as a Non-Governmental Organisation (NGO). In 2014, Ministry of finance revealed that, there were as many as 213 cases of tax evasions of BCCI/IPL from 2009–10 to 2014, involving 261.64 Cr rupees. In the 2010s, almost every year the Income Tax Department demanded the 'outstanding income tax' from the BCCI. Frequently till 2012, the board got exemptions for tax under the IT Act 1961 (section 11) but later Income tax department declared BCCI's earnings as commercial and listed them as business incomes. During 2016 T20 world cup, Modi government gave them 10% exemption. According to Deccan Herald's article on 19 December 2021, even though BCCI is one of the world's richest sports bodies and earns thousands of millions of rupees per year, it shows unwillingness to pay income taxes and finds loopholes in laws to avoid paying taxes.

The following table contains the information of BCCI's tax payment :

FY	Amount
2013–14	₹50 or ₹100 Cr
2014–15	₹864.78 Cr
2017–18	₹596.21 Cr
2018–19	₹815.08 Cr
2019–20	₹882.29 Cr
2020–21	₹844.92 Cr
2021–22	₹1159 Cr
2022–23	₹4000 Cr

== See also ==
- India men's national cricket team
- India women's national cricket team
- India national under-19 cricket team
- India women's national under-19 cricket team
- India A cricket team
- India B cricket team
- BCCI Awards
- National Cricket Academy (NCA)
- Cricket in India
- Sport in India
- Asian Cricket Council (ACC)
- International Cricket Council (ICC)
- List of national level sport governing bodies in India
- List of films about cricket in India
