= Ramprakash Mehra =

Indian cricketer and administrator

- Born: 26 March 1917; Lahore
- Died: 7 March 1983 (aged 65); Delhi
- Education: B.A
- Alma mater: Government College University, Lahore
- Occupation: MD of Paramount Finances Pvt. Ltd.
- Title: President of BCCI
- Term: 1975–1977
- Predecessor: P. M. Rungta
- Successor: M. Chinnaswamy

Ramprakash Mehra (26 March 1917 – 7 March 1983) was an Indian cricketer and administrator.

== Biography ==
Born in Lahore, Ramprakash Mehra was the President of Board of Control for Cricket in India in 1975/76 and 1976/77, joint secretary between 1960/61 and 1962/63 and Vice President from 1963/64 to 1974/75. He was the head of the Delhi and Districts Cricket Association for nearly fifteen years.

Mehra represented Northern India in Ranji Trophy between 1934/35 and 1951/52 and Delhi in 1953/54. His only hundred in the competition was a 209* scored against Maharashtra in the 1940/41 semifinal, despite which his side totalled only 442 and ended up on the losing side.

He was in the reserves for the Bombay Pentangular match between Hindus and Europeans in 1943/44. Coming in for Dattu Phadkar at the last moment, he hit 116 notout. He toured England with the Rajputana club in 1938 and stayed back after the tour.

Mehra did his B.A. from the Government College University, Lahore and played for the university team for four years from 1935/36. In the last of those years, he played for Indian Universities against the Lord Tennyson's team. He was a right-handed batsman.

Mehra was the second official of the Indian team that toured England in 1971 and the manager of the under-19 team's planned tour to Pakistan in 1980/81, which went to Sri Lanka instead. He accompanied the Indian hockey team in its tour of Japan in 1966 and Europe in 1967. He was the MD of Paramount Finances Pvt. Ltd. Mehra died in Delhi of a heart attack.
