= Abhinav Manohar =

Indian cricketer (born 1994)

Personal information
- Full name: Abhinav Manohar Sadarangani
- Born: 16 September 1994 (age 32); Bangalore, Karnataka, India
- Batting: Right-handed
- Bowling: Leg break googly
- Role: Batting all-rounder

Domestic team information
- Years: Team
- 2021/22–: Karnataka
- 2022–2024: Gujarat Titans
- 2015: Hubli Tigers
- 2016-2018: Bellary Tuskers
- 2019: Belagavi Panthers
- 2022: Mangalore United
- 2023-: Shivamogga Lions
- 2025: Sunrisers Hyderabad

Career statistics
Competition	FC	LA	T20
Matches	4	17	44
Runs scored	180	384	731
Batting average	45.00	42.66	29.24
100s/50s	0/1	0/3	0/3
Top score	55	91	70*
Catches/stumpings	3/–	6/–	23/–
- Source: ESPNcricinfo, 27 March 2025

Abhinav Manohar Sadarangani (born 16 September 1994) is an Indian cricketer. He made his Twenty20 debut on 16 November 2021, for Karnataka in the preliminary quarter-finals of the 2021–22 Syed Mushtaq Ali Trophy, where he top-scored in the match with 70 not out. He made his List A debut on 19 December 2021, also for Karnataka, in the preliminary quarter-finals of the 2021–22 Vijay Hazare Trophy.

In February 2022, he was bought by the Gujarat Titans in the auction for the 2022 Indian Premier League tournament. In 2024, Abhinav was bought by Sunrisers Hyderabad in the IPL auction.
