= S. Sriraman =

Indian cricket administrator

Srinivasan Sriraman

20th President of BCCI
- In office 1985–1988
- Preceded by: N. K. P. Salve
- Succeeded by: Biswanath Dutt

Personal details
- Born: 16 November 1918 Madras, British India
- Died: 11 June 1993 (aged 74) Chennai, Tamil Nadu

Srinivasan Sriraman (16 November 1918 – 11 June 1993, in Madras) was an Indian cricket administrator.

Sriraman was the joint secretary of the Madras Cricket Association from 1942 to 1944/45, secretary of the Tamil Nadu Cricket Association (TNCA) 1954–1985, BCCI joint secretary in 1963/64 and 1964/65, secretary 1965/66 – 1969/70, vice president 1977/78 – 1984/85 and the president between 1985/86 and 1988/89.

During his tenure as TNCA secretary, Sriraman shifted the cricket ground of the Tamil Nadu cricket team from the Corporation Stadium to the Chepauk stadium through a lease arranged through his relationship with Tamil Nadu chief minister and childhood friend K. Kamaraj. India co-hosted the 1987 Cricket World Cup along with Pakistan during his tenure as the BCCI president.

Sriraman was made the honorary life member of the Marylebone Cricket Club (MCC) in 1972. He served as an umpire in one Ranji Trophy match. He was the assistant manager on India's tour of Australia in 1977/78. A conference hall in the M.A. Chidambaram Stadium (S. Sriraman Hall) is named after him.

He died of a heart attack.
