= Oriental Cricket Club =

The Oriental Cricket Club was a cricket club established by the Parsi community in Bombay in 1848. The origins of Indian Cricket, that is, cricket played by Indians are to be found in Bombay and the first Indian community to start playing the game was the small community of Zoroastrians, the Parsi. The Parsi community viewed these clubs as a way of cementing ties with the British colonial powers. They were sponsored by Parsi businessmen like the Wadias and the Tatas. Though the club was the first to be organised by Indians, it was closed a few years later. The Parsis were the first to start the cricket in India because they were in close contacts with the Imperial British, as they were interested in trade. The British offered no help to the enthusiastic Parsis.
