= NR Group =

Indian manufacturer

- Founded: 1948 in Mysore, Mysore State, India
- Founder: N. Ranga Rao
- Area served: Asia; Europe; Africa; Middle East; Far East
- Key people: Arjun Murthy Ranga (MD & CEO)
- Products: Incense, Prayer materials
- Website: https://www.nesso.com/nr-group/

NR Group is an Indian business group which comprises six companies in various businesses such as essential oils, fragrances, incense, and electronics. It is based in Mysore, and was established in 1948 by N. Ranga Rao as Mysore Products and General Trading Company, which later became N. Ranga Rao & Sons.

Ranga Rao & Sons, started in 1948, is a manufacturer of incense and fragrances. It has a portfolio of over 500 fragrances, all of which are created and blended in-house. Cycle is the main incense brand.

N. Ranga Rao & Sons Exports is the exports division of the NR Group of companies, handling all the outsourcing of their products to over 50 countries. NESSO – Natural & Essential Oils Pvt. Ltd., is a manufacturer and marketer of essential oils and floral extracts. Established in 1979, the manufacturing facility is CGM compliant and has a Kosher Certification. The company has its extraction facility near Mysore strategically located where best quality Tuberose flower is cultivated. Rangsons Marketing Services Pvt Ltd. is the marketing section of NR Group. Established in 1983, the company markets Cycle Pure Agarbathies and develops the Fragrance Domain products of NR Group. Ripple Fragrances Pvt. Ltd., established in 2005, is a manufacturer and marketer of personal and air care lifestyle products of signature brands IRIS and Lia.

== History ==
Established in 1948, and essential oils. Cycle brand incense is exported to over 65 countries.

Initially a family enterprise, the group's companies now have independent corporate setups, and are currently managed by the third generation of the family, overseeing operations as CEOs.

== Incense ==
The incense division, N. Ranga Rao & Sons Pvt. Ltd., has a number of brands including Cycle, Flute, Manmohak, and Clove. The exports division exports incense and related products to more than 50 countries in Asia, Africa, Europe, Latin America, the Middle East, Far East and North America. It is headed by Arjun Ranga. The Cycle brand, Cycle Pure Agarbathies, was established in 1948, initially distributing only to domestic market. The fragrances are blended in house

Cycle Agarbathies is the flagship brand under NR Group, based in India, and a manufacturer of incense and prayer materials.

As of 2016, Cycle held a 15% share in the incense industry in India, estimated to be worth Rs. 1500 crore overall. The brand advertises through sponsorship deals of various cricket tournaments in India and elsewhere, including the Indian Premier League and Caribbean Premier League. Currently the brand ambassador are Amitabh Bachchan, Ramesh Aravind, Saurav Ganguly.

== Other divisions ==
Ripple Fragrances Pvt. Ltd. is the spatial fragrance division of the NR Group, manufacturing Functional & Aircare Lifestyle Products. Established in 2005. It is headed by Kiran Ranga.

Rangsons Marketing Services Pvt Ltd., established in 1993, is the marketing arm of NR Group.

NR Foundation is the Corporate Social Responsibility arm.

Natural & Essential Oils Pvt. Ltd (NESSO), established in 1979, is the division that manufactures essential oils and floral extracts.
