= Shubhang Hegde =

Indian cricketer (born 2001)

Personal information
- Born: 30 March 2001 (age 25); Bangalore, Karnataka, India
- Batting: Left-handed
- Bowling: Slow left arm orthodox
- Role: Bowler
- Source: Cricinfo, 7 January 2019

Shubhang Hegde (born 30 March 2001) is an Indian cricketer. He made his first-class debut for Karnataka in the 2018–19 Ranji Trophy on 7 January 2019. In December 2019, he was named in India's squad for the 2020 Under-19 Cricket World Cup.
