= Madabhushi Sridhar =

Indian academic and Information Commissioner (born 1956)

Sridhar Madabhushi Acharyulu
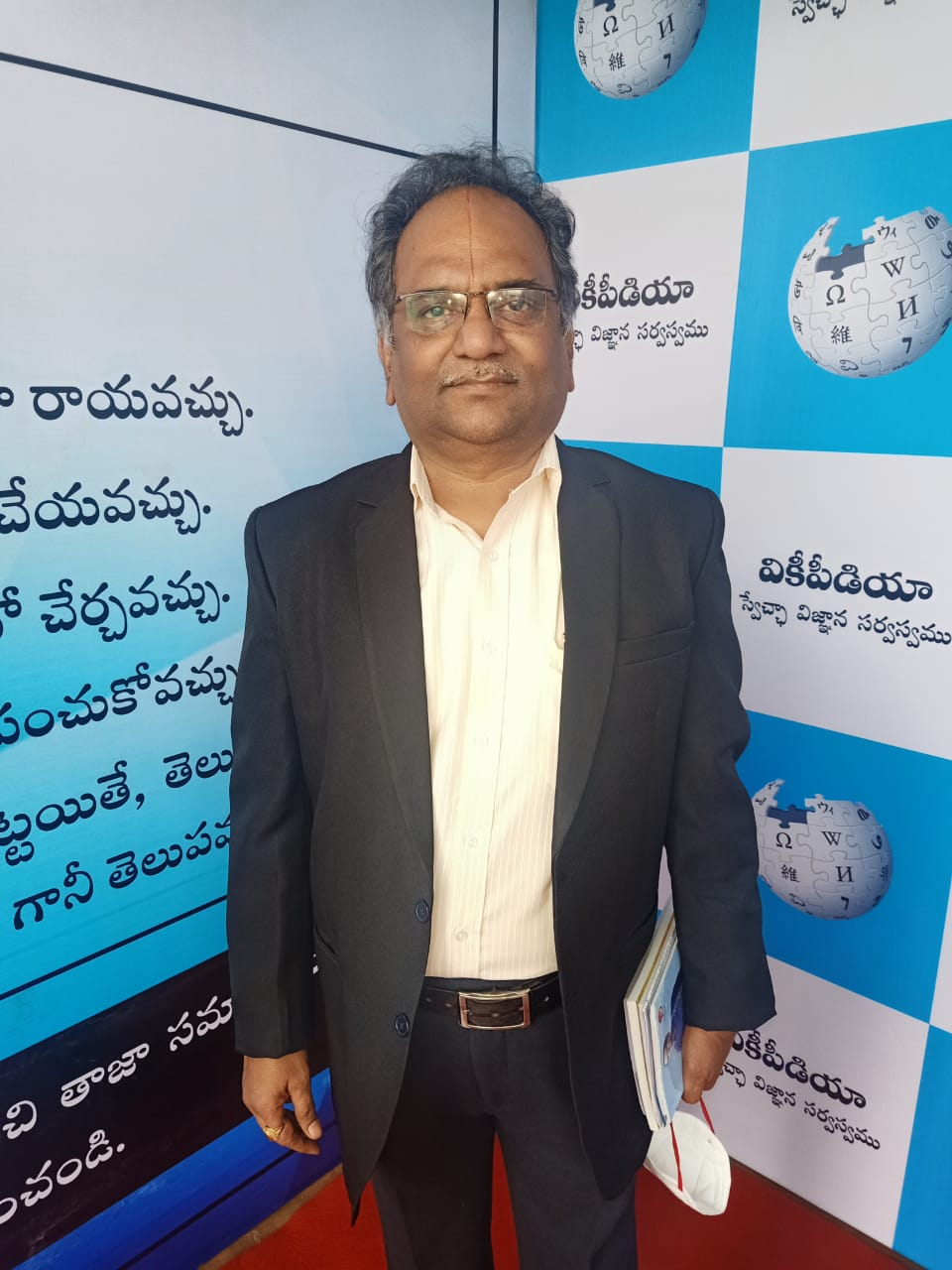
- Born: 10 November 1956 (age 69); Warangal, Telangana, India
- Education: Osmania University
- Occupation: Former Central Information Commissioner

Madabhushi Sridhar Acharyulu (born 10 November 1956) is an Indian academic and Information Commissioner. He is presently serving as a Dean, School of Law, Mahindra University. He was once a professor at Nalsar University of Law in Hyderabad and Dean at Bennet University. He's an alumnus of the Department of Journalism and Mass Communication at Osmania University.

== Early life ==
He was born in Warangal to Freedom Fighter and Founder Editor of Janadharma Weekly and Warangal Vani Daily, M. S. Acharya and Ranganayakamma. He studied at Masoom Ali High School, AVV Junior College, CKM College, Law College Warangal. He is a post graduate in LL.M., and M.C.J (Journalism) from Osmania University.

== Career ==
He served as a Dean, School of Law, Mahindra University, Hyderabad. Prior to this he was a professor at School of Law, Bennett University, Greater Noida for over two years before which he was a professor at Nalsar University of Law, Hyderabad, for more than 13 years. He wrote 30 books on law and journalism, in English and Telugu, including four on the Right to Information Act.

=== Information Commissioner ===
He was appointed as Information Commissioner on 21 November 2013.

== As a writer ==
List of Law Books (in English)

List of Publications...

- RTI: Duty to Disclose, 2019 Revised Edition of RTI Use and Abuse, 2015, Allahabad Law Agency Faridabad, Haryana
- Privacy as Secrecy: (September 2018), Asia Law House, Hyderabad
- Is Bribery a Family Affair? Analysis of Privacy of Public Servants, 2017 publication in Visakhapatnam.
- Telangana, AP Reorganization Act, 2014, Asia Law House, Hyderabad 2015
- Telangana: The 29th State Empowered by Article 3: Mohan Law House Delhi, 2014
- Constitutional Governance and Judicial Process: Editor: Asia Law House, 2014
- Nirbhaya Act (Is it impossible to stop RAPE), Asia Law House, 2013
- New Media- Internet, Module III, PG Diploma Course, Nalsar Pro, Hyderabad. 2011
- Media Law- Policy, Module 1, PG Diploma Course, NalsarPro, Hyderabad.2012
- Judging Right to Information, Center for Good Governance, 2011
- The Other side of Nuclear Liability, All India Lawyers Union AP Committee, 2010
- Environmental Empowerment: Asia Law House, Hyderabad August 2009
- Unfair Rent and Uncontrollable Controls, Asia Law House, Hyderabad, August 2009
- Elections and Media: Kalaala Kaapalaa, Telugu Book on role of media in covering elections, AP Press Academy, Hyderabad. 2009 March
- Law of Expression: (Law for Media) Asia Law House, Hyderabad, May 2007 publication, Pages 1300
- Co-editor: P.A. Choudary's Vision and Mission, Indian Constitutional Governance (analysis of Judgments of Justice Choudary) Asia Law House, Hyderabad, 2007 June.
- Ramaswamy Iyer's Law of Torts, Co-author, with Prof A. Lakshminath, published by Butterworth's, New Delhi, 2007
- Right to Information, Wadhwa, Nagpur, 2006, New Delhi
- Alternative Dispute Resolution, Negotiation and Mediation, 2006, Butterworth's, New Delhi Legal Language, Asia Law House, Hyderabad.
- “FIR, Arrest & Bail” published by Asia Law House.
- "Appointment of Judges: A Critical Analysis", A Research Project for publication to Lok Satta, Hyderabad
- Constitutional Foundations of Media Law, Module II, PG Diploma Course, Nalsar Pro, Hyderabad, 2010
- Advertisements and Law, Fourth Module for Media Law, PG Diploma Course, Nalsar-pro, Hyderabad. 2010

=== List of Books (in Telugu) ===
- Nilichi Gelichina Telangana, (Telugu book on formation of Telangana State) Asia Law House, 2015
- Andhra Pradesh Vibhajana Chattam, 2014, Telugu Book on AP Reorganization Act, 2014, Asia Law House, Hyderabad, 2015.
- Supreme Court Judgment on Salwa Judum, 2013
- Ayodhya Teerpu: Telugu book on Ayodhya Judgment, published by EMESCO, Hyderabad, 2011
- Right to Information Telugu Booklet, published by Telugu University and AP Official Language Commission, 2006
- Equal Rights to Daughters, Telugu Book published by Telugu University and AP Official Language Commission, 2006
- Dharmasana Chaitanyam, (Judicial Activism in Telugu)
- Kaarmika Chattalu (Labour Laws in Telugu) revised in 2013
- FIR, Arrest & Bail (Telugu) Revised in 2012
- Mahilalu Chattalu (Women & Law in Telugu) Revised in 2012
- Panchanama (Telugu)
- Patrikarachana -ParuvuNastam - Court dhikkaram, writing for the press, Defamation and Contempt of Court in Telugu publication by A.P. Press Academy, Hyderabad)
- Nyayavyavastha (Judicial System), a book in Telugu, published by Telugu Academy, Government of Andhra Pradesh, Hyderabad, 2004
- Paryavarana Parijnanam, Environmental Law in Telugu, published by NALSAR under Environment Capacity building programme. 2003
- Booklets for National Human Rights Commission
- Bonded Labour, NALSAR- NHRC booklet published, (Telugu Booklet) April 2005
- Manual Scavenging, NALSAR- NHRC (Telugu Booklet), April 2005
- Human Rights Commission, NALSAR- NHRC (Telugu Booklet), April 2005
- International Treaties on Human Rights, NALSAR- NHRC (Telugu Booklet), April 2005
- Sexual Harassment, NALSAR- NHRC (Telugu Booklet), April 2005
- Human Rights and AIDS, NALSAR- NHRC (Telugu Booklet), April 2005
- Child Labour, NALSAR- NHRC (Telugu Booklet), April 2005
- Rights of Disabled, NALSAR- NHRC (Telugu Booklet), April 2005

==== In Telugu ====
1. రహస్యాల ఉక్కుతెరల మధ్య పి ఎం కేర్స్ ఫండ్, Rahasyala Ukku Terala Madhya PM Cares Fund (Telugu Book on PM Cares Fund amidst Iron Curtains of Secrecy, MB VK and SVK publication, Nov 2020.
2. వాళ్లెందుకు నడుస్తున్నారు. కరోనా కాలంలో వలస కూలీల వెతలు Vallenduku Nadustunnaru: Marathon Walk of Migrant Workers in India during COVID-19, MVK Publishers, 2020 July
3. ఎవడ్రా నన్ను పౌరుడు కాదన్నది? Yevadra Nannu Pourudu Kadannadi?, Who doubts my citizenship? Telugu book on CAA, NRC NPR
4. నిలిచి గెలిచిన తెలంగాణ Nilichi Gelichina Telangana, (Telugu book on formation of Telangana State) Asia Law House, 2015
5. ఆంధ్రప్రదేశ్ విభజన చట్టం Andhra Pradesh Vibhajana Chattam, 2014, Telugu Book on AP Reorganization Act, 2014, Asia Law House, Hyderabad, 2015.
6. సల్వా జుడుం సుప్రీం తీర్పు Supreme Court Judgment on Salwa Judum, 2013
7. అయోధ్య తీర్పు Ayodhya Teerpu: Telugu book on Ayodhya Judgment, published by EMESCO, Hyderabad, 2011
8. తెలుగు సమాచార హక్కు చట్టం Right to Information Telugu Booklet, published by Telugu University and AP Official Language Commission, 2006
9. కూతుళ్లకు సమాన హక్కులు Equal Rights to Daughters, Telugu Book published by Telugu University and AP Official Language Commission, 2006
10. సమాచారం మన జన్మ హక్కు Samacharam Mana Janma Hakku, Right to Information, Our Birth Right, Telugu book by Asia Law House, Hyderabad. 2006
11. ధర్మాసన చైతన్యం Dharmasana Chaitanyam, (Judicial Activism in Telugu) 1998
12. చెన్నకేశవ చరిత్ర Chenna Keshava Charitra: History of Chanrayangutta, Hyderabad, 2013
13. కార్మిక చట్టాలు Kaarmika Chattalu (Labour Laws in Telugu) revised in 2013
14. ప్రథమసమాచార నివేదిక అరెస్టు బెయిల్ FIR, Arrest & Bail (Telugu) Revised in 2012
15. మహిళలు చట్టాలు Mahilalu Chattalu (Women & Law in Telugu) Revised in 2012
16. కలాల కాపలా: ఎన్నికలు పత్రికలు Media & Elections: Kalaala Kaapalaa, Telugu Book on role of media in covering elections, AP Press Academy, Hyderabad. 2009 March
17. పంచనామా తెలుగు పుస్తకం Panchanama (Telugu)
18. పత్రికా రచన పరువు నష్టం: Patrikarachana -Paruvu Nastam - Court Dhikkaram, writing for the press, Defamation and Contempt of Court in Telugu) publication by A.P. Press Academy, Hyderabad)
19. న్యాయవ్యవస్థ Nyayavyavastha (Judicial System), a book in Telugu, published by Telugu Academy, Government of Andhra Pradesh, Hyderabad, 2004
20. పర్యావరణ పరిజ్ఞానం Paryavarana Parijnanam, Environmental Law in Telugu, published by NALSAR under Environment Capacity building programme. 2003
21. నాన్న, రాజన్ తండ్రి కథ Naanna: Story of Rajan's father, Emergency incident, Hyderabad Books, 1995

== Awards ==
- Best Teacher Award, Andhra Pradesh Government - September 2013
