= M. Chinnaswamy Stadium =

Cricket stadium in Bengaluru, India

Coordinates: 12°58′44″N 77°35′58″E

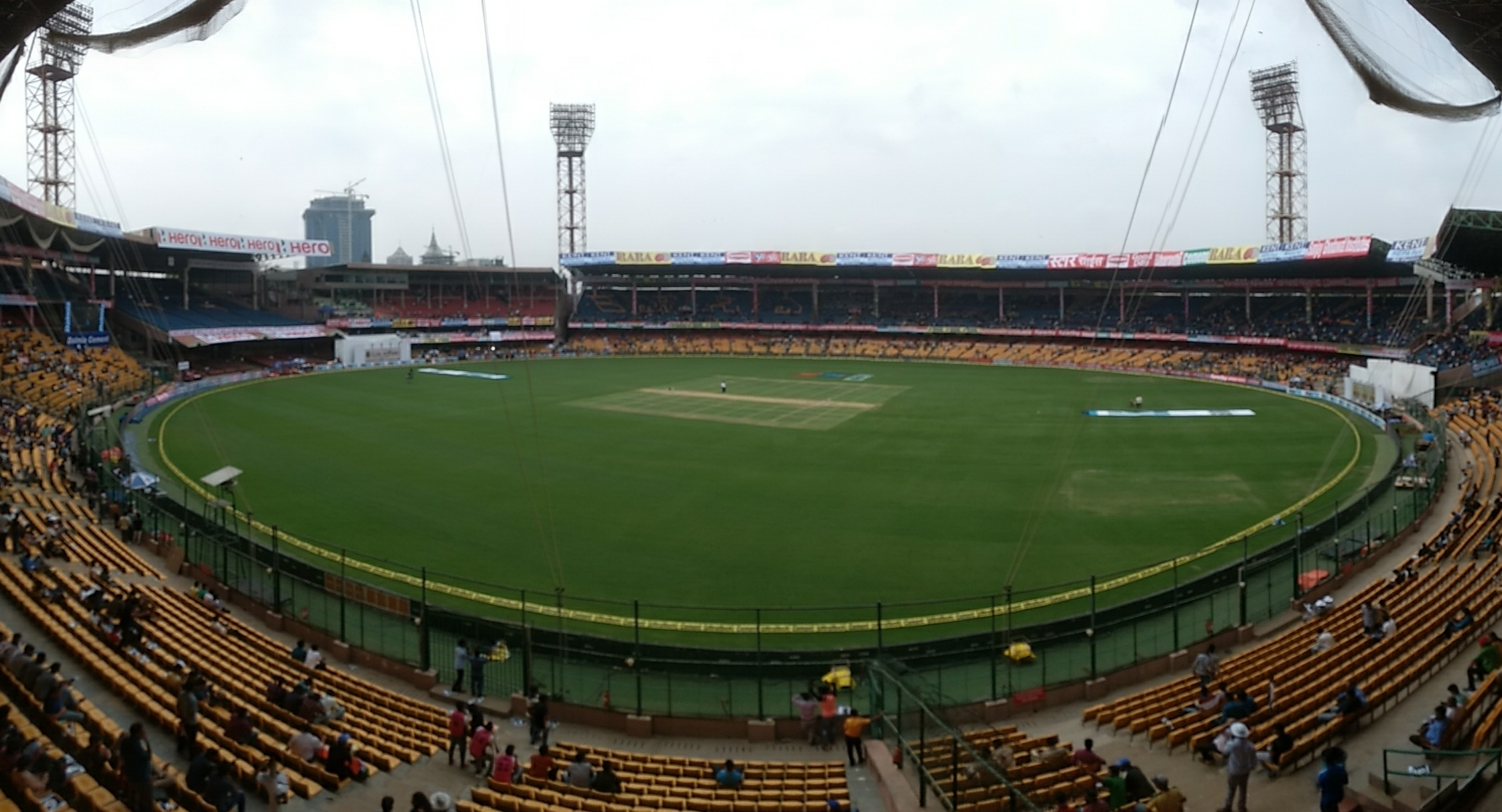
- Interactive map of M. Chinnaswamy Stadium

Ground information
- Location: Mahatma Gandhi Road, near Cubbon Road, Shivaji Nagar, Bengaluru, Karnataka, India - 560001
- Country: India
- Home club: Karnataka men's; Karnataka women's; Royal Challengers Bengaluru (IPL); Royal Challengers Bengaluru (WPL)
- Establishment: 1969 (57 years ago)
- Capacity: 40,000
- Owner: Karnataka State Cricket Association; Government of Karnataka
- Operator: Karnataka State Cricket Association
- Tenants: India men's team; India women's team
- End names
- Anil Kumble End; Rahul Dravid End

International information
- First men's Test: 22–27 November 1974: India v West Indies
- Last men's Test: 16–20 October 2024: India v New Zealand
- First men's ODI: 26 September 1982: India v Sri Lanka
- Last men's ODI: 12 November 2023: India v Netherlands
- First men's T20I: 25 December 2012: India v Pakistan
- Last men's T20I: 17 January 2024: India v Afghanistan
- Only women's Test: 31 October – 2 November 1976: India v West Indies
- First women's ODI: 12 December 1997: Australia v South Africa
- Last women's ODI: 23 June 2024: India v South Africa
- First women's T20I: 30 November 2014: India v South Africa
- Last women's T20I: 28 March 2016: South Africa v Sri Lanka
- As of 17 October 2024; Source: ESPNcricinfo

The M. Chinnaswamy Stadium, also known as the Karnataka State Cricket Association Stadium, is a cricket stadium in Bengaluru city of the Indian state of Karnataka. The ground is owned by the Government of Karnataka and operated by the Karnataka State Cricket Association (KSCA).

Flanked by the picturesque Cubbon Park, Queen's Road, Cubbon and uptown MG Road, this five-decade-old stadium is situated in the heart of the city of Bangalore. It regularly hosts Test, ODI, T20I and first-class cricket matches, as well as musical, cultural events. The stadium is the home ground of the Karnataka men's, Karnataka women's as well as franchises RCB men's and RCB women's teams. It is owned by the Government of Karnataka and has been leased out to the KSCA for a period of 100 years.

Formerly known as the Karnataka State Cricket Association Stadium, it was later rechristened in tribute to M. Chinnaswamy, a lawyer from Mandya and the founding member of the Mysore State Cricket Association. He served the KSCA for four decades and was also president of the Board of Control for Cricket in India (BCCI) from 1977 to 1980, latter's National Cricket Academy also situated in the premises of this stadium.

It is the first cricket stadium in the world to use solar panels to generate a bulk of the electricity needed to run the stadium. The panels were procured through the "Go Green" initiative of the KSCA. In 2016 a water purification plant was added, and by January 2017 a sophisticated system of aeration and drainage was in place to avoid matches being curtailed due to a wet outfield.

== History ==
With generous patronage from the Government of Karnataka, the foundation stone of this stadium was laid in 1969 and construction work commenced in 1970. The stadium was first used for First-class cricket matches during the 1972–73 season. It earned test status during the 1974–75 season when the West Indies toured India.

The Karnataka State Cricket Association (KSCA) stadium, as it was known was later renamed as a tribute to M. Chinnaswamy, who was the BCCI President from 1977 to 1980 and the Secretary and President of KSCA. Born in Mandya in 1900, he was the founding member of the Mysore State Cricket Association and a lawyer by profession. He, helped by other eminent people, was instrumental in prevailing upon the Government of Karnataka to allot the ground for cricket in the prime MG Road area in 1969.

The first Test played at this stadium was on 22–27 November 1974. This was the debut Test match for the West Indian batsmen Viv Richards and Gordon Greenidge. The West Indians led by Clive Lloyd crushed M. A. K. Pataudi's Indian team by 256 runs. India registered their first Test win on this ground against the touring English team led by Tony Greig in 1976–77. The first ODI match at this venue was played on 6 September 1982. India defeated Sri Lanka by six wickets in that match.

Floodlights were first installed at this stadium for the 1996 Wills World Cup. The first match played here under lights was the quarter-final clash between arch-rivals India and Pakistan on 9 March 1996 in which India defeated Pakistan by 39 runs. In 2007, in the 3rd Test Match between India and Pakistan, Sourav Ganguly and Yuvraj Singh led a 300 run partnership fightback from 61/4, breaking several records. India's 365/5 at stumps was the highest first-day score in India. The 300 run partnership was the highest partnership at the stadium and the highest left-hander batsmen partnership. Sourav Ganguly's 239 is the highest left-hander score.

Since the BCCI chose Bangalore as the centre for the National Cricket Academy in 2000, many budding cricketers have passed out of the academy housed on this ground. Chinnaswamy Stadium is also the home ground of the Bangalore franchise team, the Royal Challengers Bangalore. It was painted in red and yellow, the team colours of the Royal Challengers and also the colours of the Karnataka flag (cultural flag). This stadium also served as the venue for the 1996 Miss World pageant, when it was first held in India.

Following a crowd crush on 4 June 2025 which resulted in 11 fatalities, the stadium was deemed unfit to organise large gatherings and hence was withdrawn from list of IPL stadiums for 2026. In August 2025, ICC announced that the DY Patil Stadium in Navi Mumbai replaced Bengaluru for the ICC Women's World Cup 2025.

== Features ==
Karnataka State Cricket Association claims that their stadium is world's only solar powered cricket stadium. They inspired to install a solar system at the stadium from Germany's Freiburg football stadium, which is fully powered by solar energy. KSCA initiated the ₹4.5 Cr and 400 KW project in February 2015.

The venue has 40,000 seats. Its ground is small thus it has small boundaries, due to this, batting teams often score high totals here. It is evident by the fact that in the 2023 Indian Premier League edition, teams scored 210 plus runs on four and 170+ on three occasions in 8 innings played here. As per former Royal Challengers Bangalore's bowler Harshal Patel "It is hard to bowl at the Chinnaswamy. It is a small ground and the ball generally flies".

== Cricket World Cups ==
This stadium has hosted One Day International (ODI) matches for all editions of the World cups, when India was a host/co-host.

14 October 1987
Scorecard

India; 252/7 (50 overs)	v	New Zealand; 236/8 (50 overs)
Navjot Sidhu 75 (71); Dipak Patel 3/36 (10 overs)		Ken Rutherford 75 (95); Maninder Singh 2/40 (10 overs)

India won by 16 runs
M.Chinnaswamy Stadium, Bangalore, India
Umpires: David Archer and Dickie Bird
Player of the match: Kapil Dev

Quarter final match

9 March 1996
scorecard

India; 287/8 (50 overs)	v	Pakistan; 248/9 (49 overs)
Navjot Sidhu 93 (115); Mushtaq Ahmed 2/56 (10 overs)		Aamer Sohail 55 (46); Venkatesh Prasad 3/45 (10 overs)

India won by 39 runs
M Chinnaswamy Stadium, Bangalore, India
Umpires: Steve Bucknor and David Shepherd
Player of the match: Navjot Sidhu

- Pakistan was fined 1 over for a slow over rate

ICC World Cup 2011

11th Match, Group B

27 February 2011
Scorecard

India; 338/10 (49.5 overs)	v	England; 338/8 (50 overs)
Sachin Tendulkar 120 (115); Tim Bresnan 5/48 (10 overs)		Andrew Strauss 158(145); Zaheer Khan 3/64 (10 overs)

Match Tied
M Chinnaswamy Stadium, Bangalore, India
Umpires: Marais Erasmus and Billy Bowden
Player of the match: Andrew Strauss

15th Match, Group B

2 March 2011
scorecard

England; 327/8 (50 overs)	v	Ireland; 329/7 (49.1 overs)
Jonathan Trott 92 (92); John Mooney 4/63 (9 overs)		Kevin O'Brien 113 (63); Graeme Swann 3/47 (10 overs)

Ireland won by 3 wickets
M Chinnaswamy Stadium, Bangalore, India
Umpires: Billy Bowden and Aleem Dar
Player of the match: Kevin O'Brien

22nd Match, Group B

6 March 2011
scorecard

Ireland; 207/10 (47.5 overs)	v	India; 210/5 (46 overs)
William Porterfield 75 (104); Yuvraj Singh 5/31 (10 overs)		Yuvraj Singh 50 (75); Trent Johnston 2/16 (5 overs)

India won by 5 wickets
M Chinnaswamy Stadium, Bangalore, India
Umpires: Billy Bowden and Rod Tucker
Player of the match: Yuvraj Singh

31st Match, Group A

13 March 2011
scorecard

Australia; 324/6 (50 overs)	v	Kenya; 264/6 (50 overs)
Michael Clarke 93 (80); Nehemiah Odhiambo 3/57 (10 overs)		Collins Obuya 98 (129); Shaun Tait 2/49 (8 overs)

Australia won by 60 runs
M Chinnaswamy Stadium, Bangalore, India
Umpires: Asad Rauf (PAK) and Richard Kettleborough (ENG)
Player of the match: Collins Obuya (KEN)

35th Match, Group A

16 March 2011
scorecard

Canada; 211/10 (45.4 overs)	v	Australia; 212/3 (34.5 overs)
Hiral Patel 54 (45); Brett Lee 4/46 (8.4 overs)		Shane Watson 94 (90); John Davison 1/29 (4 overs)

Australia won by 7 wickets
M Chinnaswamy Stadium, Bangalore, India
Umpires: Amiesh Saheba and Billy Bowden
Player of the match: Shane Watson

ICC World Cup 2023

18th Match

20 October 2023
scorecard

Australia; 367/9 (50 overs)	v	Pakistan; 305 (45.3 overs)
David Warner 163 (124); Shaheen Afridi 5/54 (10 overs)		Imam-ul-Haq 70 (71); Adam Zampa 4/53 (10 overs)

Australia won by 62 runs
M Chinnaswamy Stadium, Bangalore, India
Umpires: Chris Brown (NZ) and Richard Illingworth (Eng)
Player of the match: David Warner (Aus)

25th Match

26 October 2023
scorecard

England; 156 (33.2 overs)	v	Sri Lanka; 160/2 (25.4 overs)
Ben Stokes 43 (74); Lahiru Kumara 3/35 (7 overs)		Pathum Nissanka 77* (83); David Willey 2/30 (5 overs)

Sri Lanka won by 8 wickets
M Chinnaswamy Stadium, Bangalore, India
Umpires: Chris Brown (NZ) and Adrian Holdstock (SA)
Player of the match: Lahiru Kumara (SL)

35th Match

4 November 2023
scorecard

New Zealand; 401/6 (50 overs)	v	Pakistan; 200/1 (25.3 overs)
Rachin Ravindra 108 (94); Mohammad Wasim Jr. 3/60 (10 overs)		Fakhar Zaman 126* (81); Tim Southee 1/27 (5 overs)

Pakistan won by 21 runs (DLS method)
M Chinnaswamy Stadium, Bangalore, India
Umpires: Richard Kettleborough (Eng) and Paul Wilson (Aus)
Player of the match: Fakhar Zaman (Pak)

41st Match

9 November 2023
scorecard

Sri Lanka; 171 (46.4 overs)	v	New Zealand; 172/5 (23.2 overs)
Kusal Perera 51 (28); Trent Boult 3/37 (10 overs)		Devon Conway 45 (42); Angelo Mathews 2/29 (4 overs)

New Zealand won by 5 wickets
M Chinnaswamy Stadium, Bangalore, India
Umpires: Adrian Holdstock (SA) and Joel Wilson (WI)
Player of the match: Trent Boult (NZ)

48th Match

12 November 2023
scorecard

India; 410/4 (50 overs)	v	Netherlands; 250 (47.5 overs)
Shreyas Iyer 128* (94); Bas de Leede 2/82 (10 overs)		Teja Nidamanuru 54 (39); Mohammed Siraj 2/29 (6 overs)

India won by 160 runs
M Chinnaswamy Stadium, Bangalore, India
Umpires: Chris Gaffaney (NZ) and Michael Gough (Eng)
Player of the match: Shreyas Iyer (Ind)

== Domestic Cricket ==
The arena is regular venue of domestic cricket. It is home ground of Karnataka cricket team. Since 2008, it is the home ground of IPL team Royal Challengers Bangalore. The first ever game of the IPL was held at the venue. In 1998-99 Ranji trophy final at the venue, Karnataka won against Madhya Pradesh (MP). In June 2022, 2021-22 edition final of the tournament MP won its maiden title by defeating Mumbai cricket team. 2022-23 Ranji semifinal held at the venue Saurashtra cricket team defeated Karnataka.

In the final of the 2019-20 Vijay Hazare trophy Karnataka defeated Tamil Nadu there. In October 2018, in the tournament's edition Mumbai won the final by defeating Delhi at the venue.

== Events ==
Miss World 1996 beauty pageant was held in this stadium, it was the first ever that this event was organised in India. Irene Skliva of Greece became the winner.

== Sustainability initiatives ==
The M. Chinnaswamy Stadium has adopted several sustainability initiatives to minimise its environmental impact.

=== Solar energy utilisation ===
The stadium is recognised for its utilisation of solar energy. A solar power plant was established, generating over six lakh units of electricity in the first year and reducing carbon dioxide emissions by 600 tonnes. The solar panels, initially installed on the east end, are being extended to the west end to increase electricity generation.

=== Water management ===
A comprehensive water management system is in place, which includes rainwater harvesting and a sewage treatment plant. The treatment plant recycles sewage water for turf watering, gardening, and landscaping. This initiative was developed in collaboration with the Bangalore Water Supply and Sewage Board (BWSSB).

=== Subair drainage system ===
The 'subair drainage system' installed at the stadium facilitates rapid water drainage, allowing the ground to dry within 10 to 15 minutes after heavy rains, thus minimising match interruptions due to wet conditions.

=== Other eco-friendly measures ===
Additional measures to reduce environmental impact include a water purification plant and an efficient aeration and drainage system.

=== Masterplan ===
KP Padmanabha and Associates designed the original masterplan, including the main stadium, which features facilities such as a matting pitch, clubhouse, indoor games, guest rooms, and a restaurant, with a total seating capacity of 55,000, comprising a three-level pavilion and members’ stand and two-level eastern and western stands.

=== Recognition and replication ===
The sustainability initiatives at the M. Chinnaswamy Stadium have been noted, with some cricket associations in India considering replicating these initiatives. These eco-friendly projects were self-funded by the Karnataka State Cricket Association (KSCA).

== Records and statistics ==
On 14 June 2018, after being granted 'Test Status' by the ICC in 2017, Afghanistan played their first ever test match at this venue against India. The only T20I match in which double super over was played is in this stadium between India and Afghanistan on 17 January 2024 where Rohit Sharma scored his 5th century in T20I. This match is considered as the longest T20I match in world.

=== Test match records ===
==== Batting ====
Most career runs
Runs	Player	Period
869 (16 Innings)	(India) Sachin Tendulkar	1994–2012
600 (12 Innings)	(India) Sunil Gavaskar	1974–1987
513 (11 Innings)	(India) Virender Sehwag	2001–2012
503 (13 Innings)	(India) Sourav Ganguly	1998–2008
450 (8 Innings)	(India) Gundappa Viswanath	1974–1981

Most career runs (Non-India)
Runs	Player	Period
431 (4 Innings)	(Pakistan) Younis Khan	2005–2007
305 (5 Innings)	(Australia) Ricky Ponting	1998–2010
287 (6 Innings)	(Australia) Simon Katich	2004–2010
245 (4 Innings)	(Cricket West Indies) Alvin Kallicharran	1974–1978
231 (4 Innings)	(Australia) Michael Hussey	2008–2010

Highest individual score
Runs	Player	Year
267 vs India	(Pakistan) Younis Khan	2005
239 vs Pakistan	(India) Sourav Ganguly	2007
214 vs Australia	(India) Sachin Tendulkar	2010
201 vs Pakistan	(India) Virender Sehwag	2005

==== Bowling ====
Most career wickets
Wickets	Player	Period
41 (16 Innings)	(India) Anil Kumble	1994–2008
30 (11 Innings)	(India) R Ashwin	2012–2024
30 (14 Innings)	(India) Harbhajan Singh	1998–2010
27 (15 Innings)	(India) Kapil Dev	1978–1994
21 (9 Innings)	(India) Ravindra Jadeja	2015–2024

Most career wickets (Non-India)
Wickets	Player	Period
11 (4 Innings)	(Pakistan) Danish Kaneria	2005–2007
10 (4 Innings)	(Australia) Michael Kasprowicz	1998–2004
10 (4 Innings)	(New Zealand) Tim Southee	2010–2024
9 (5 Innings)	(Pakistan) Iqbal Qasim	1979–1987
9 (4 Innings)	(Pakistan) Mohammad Sami	2005–2007
9 (2 Innings)	(Pakistan) Tauseef Ahmed	1987–1987
9 (4 Innings)	(Australia) Shane Warne	1998–2004

Best innings figures
Figures	Player	Year
8/50 vs India	(Australia) Nathan Lyon	2017
7/27 vs Pakistan	(India) Maninder Singh	1987
7/64 vs India	(New Zealand) Tim Southee	2012
6/41 vs Australia	(India) R Ashwin	2017
6/53 vs India	(England) Bob Willis	1977
6/59 vs New Zealand	(India) Narendra Hirwani	1988
6/71 vs England	(India) Bishan Singh Bedi	1977

Best match figures
Figures	Player	Year
11/224 vs England	(India) Harbhajan Singh	2004
10/126 vs Australia	(India) Maninder Singh	1987
9/120 vs Pakistan	(India) Anil Kumble	1995
9/121 vs India	(Pakistan) Iqbal Qasim	1987
9/131 vs New Zealand	(India) B. S. Chandrasekhar	1977
9/139 vs India	(Pakistan) Tauseef Ahmed	1987

==== Team records ====
Highest innings score
Score	Team	Year
626	India vs Pakistan	2007
570	Pakistan vs India	2005
541/6d	India vs Sri Lanka	1974
537	Pakistan vs India	2007
495	India vs Australia	2010

Lowest completed innings
Score	Team	Year
46	India vs New Zealand	2024
103	Afghanistan vs India	2018
109	Afghanistan vs India	2018
109	Sri Lanka vs India	2022
112	Australia vs India	2017
145	India vs Pakistan	1987

==== Partnership records ====
Highest partnerships
Runs	Wicket	Players	Match	Year
324	3rd	Younis Khan (267) & Inzamam-ul-Haq (187)	Pakistan vs India	2005
308	3rd	Sachin Tendulkar (214) & Murali Vijay (139)	India vs Australia	2010
300	5th	Sourav Ganguly (239) & Yuvraj Singh (169)	India vs Pakistan	2007
207	4th	Gordon Greenidge (107) & Clive Lloyd (163)	West Indies vs India	1974

All records correct as of 10 November 2015.

=== One day international match records ===
Highest total: 410-4 – IND v NED. The second was 401–6 – NZL v PAK 4 November 2023.

Highest Run Chase : 329–7 – Ireland scored 329 (in 49.1 overs) against England's 327 runs from 50 overs, 2 March 2011, during world cup match.

Highest individual score: 209 scored by Rohit Sharma

The most runs were scored by Sachin Tendulkar (534 runs) followed by Rohit Sharma (498 runs) and Virender Sehwag (328 runs).

The most wickets were taken by Zaheer Khan (14 wickets) followed by Javagal Srinath (10 wickets) and Venkatesh Prasad & Kapil Dev (8 wickets each)

=== IPL records ===
Highest total - 287 - SRH v RCB, 2024

6th Highest total - 263 - RCB v Pune Warriors, 2013

Highest individual score - CH Gayle, 175 (66 balls) for RCB v Pune Warriors, 2013

Best Bowling figures - S Badree, 4/9 for RCB v MI, 2017

== Gallery ==
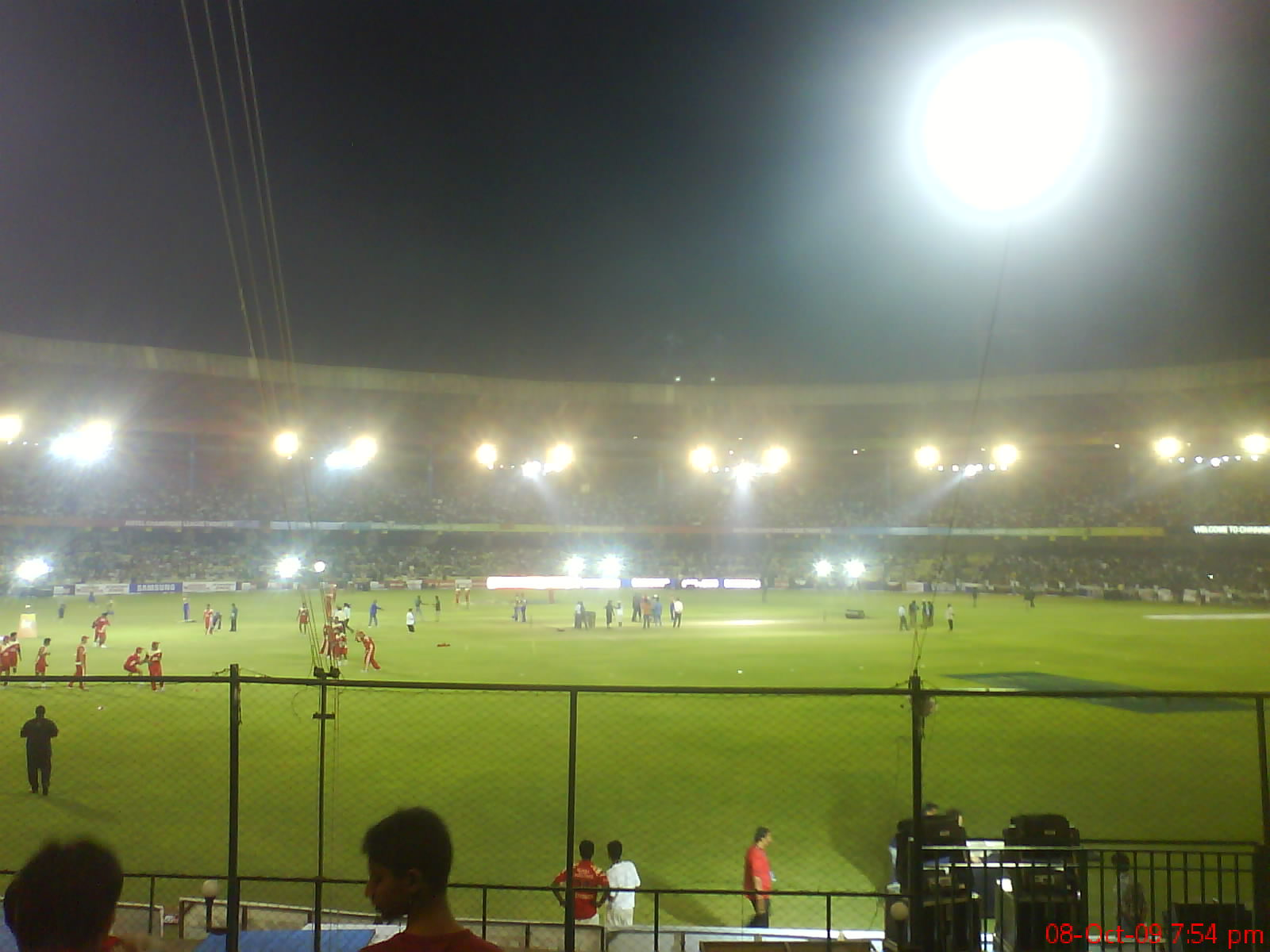
The stadium during 2010 Champions League Twenty20

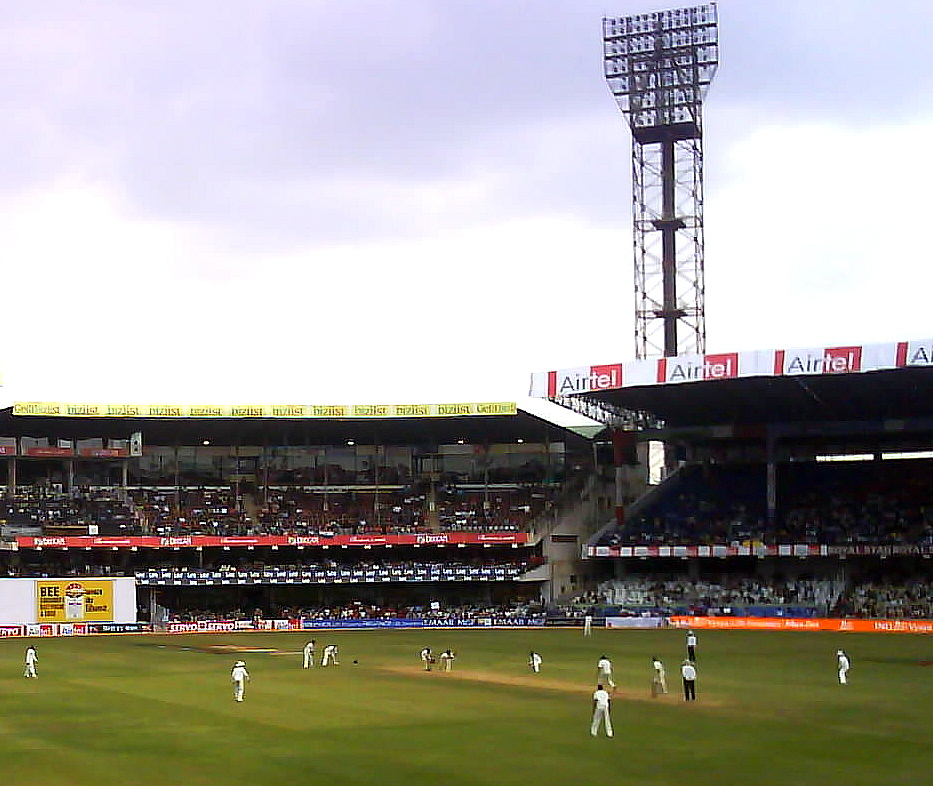
The Stadium in 2007 during a India vs Pakistan test cricket match

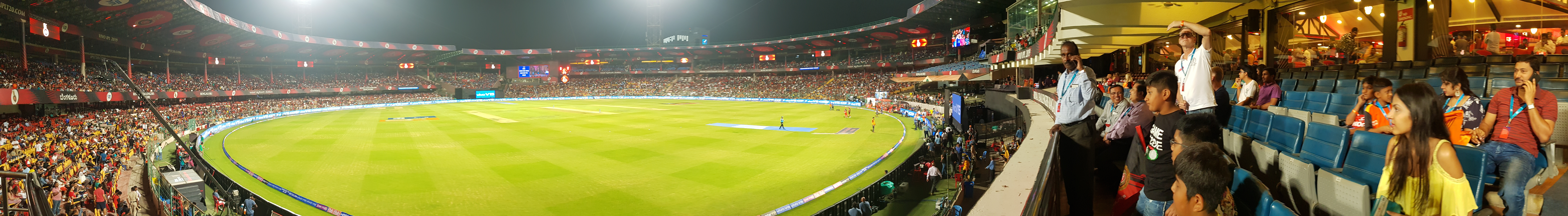
Panoramic view (RCB vs SRH IPL match on 4 May 2019)

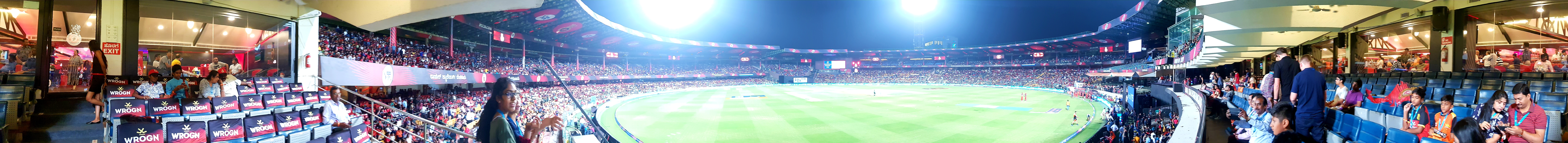
panoramic view from P2 stand

== See also ==
- List of stadiums in India
- List of cricket grounds by capacity
- List of Test cricket grounds
- Lists of stadiums
