= Chairman of the International Cricket Council =

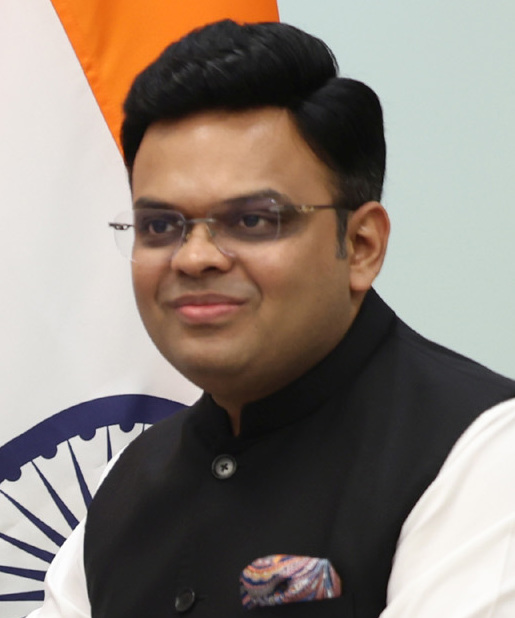
- Incumbent; Jay Shah since 1 December 2024
- International Cricket Council (ICC)
- Style: Mr.
- Type: Chairman
- Status: Head of the International Cricket Council
- Seat: Dubai, United Arab Emirates
- Term length: 2 years; renewable twice (6 years maximum)
- Precursor: President of the International Cricket Council
- Formation: 2014 (12 years ago)
- Deputy: Deputy Chairman of International Cricket Council
- Website: www.icc-cricket.com

The chairman of the International Cricket Council (ICC) is the highest position in the governing body of world cricket. The position was established as an honorary post in 2014 after a revamp of the management of ICC. The chairman heads the ICC board of directors. Formerly, the ICC president headed the ICC council but that position become a largely honorary post since the changes pushed through to the ICC constitution in 2014 handed control to the so-called 'Big Three', the England and Wales Cricket Board, Board of Control for Cricket in India and Cricket Australia. Former BCCI president N. Srinivasan became the first chairman of ICC on 26 June 2014.

Shashank Manohar resigned as Chairman of the International Cricket Council (ICC) on 30 June 2020, after more than four years in the role. ICC deputy chairman Imran Khwaja was made interim chairman until an election in November. New Zealand administrator Greg Barclay was elected chairman on 24 November 2020.

In August 2024, Jay Shah was elected as ICC chairman and assumed office from 1 December 2024.

== List of ICC Presidents ==
No.	Name	Country	Term of office		Time in office
1	Colin Cowdrey	England	1989	1993	4 years
2	Clyde Walcott	West Indies	1993	1997	4 years
3	Jagmohan Dalmiya	India	1997	2000	3 years
4	Malcolm Gray	Australia	2000	2003	3 years
5	Ehsan Mani	Pakistan	2003	2006	3 years
6	Percy Sonn	South Africa	2006	2007	1 year
7	Ray Mali	South Africa	2007	2008	1 year
8	David Morgan	England	2008	2010	2 years
9	Sharad Pawar	India	2010	2012	2 years
10	Alan Isaac	New Zealand	2012	2014	2 years
11	Mustafa Kamal	Bangladesh	2014	2015	1 year
12	Zaheer Abbas	Pakistan	2015	2016	1 year

== List of ICC Chairmen ==
No.	Name	Country	Term of office		Time in office
1	N. Srinivasan	India	26 June 2014	9 November 2015	1 year, 136 days
2	Shashank Manohar	India	22 November 2015	30 June 2020	4 years, 221 days
3	Greg Barclay	New Zealand	24 November 2020	30 November 2024	4 years, 6 days
4	Jay Shah	India	1 December 2024	Incumbent	1 year, 351 days

== List of ICC Deputy Chairmen ==
No.	Name	Country	Term of office		Time in office
1	Imran Khwaja	Singapore	June 2017	Incumbent	9 years
