= Malcolm Speed =

Australian businessman, cricket executive (born 1948)

Malcolm Speed AO

Chief Executive Officer International Cricket Council
- In office 2001–2008
- Preceded by: David Richards (cricket administrator)
- Succeeded by: Haroon Lorgat

Personal details
- Born: 14 September 1948 (age 77) Melbourne, Victoria, Australia
- Occupation: Businessman; cricket executive
- Known for: Former CEO of the International Cricket Council

Malcolm Walter Speed AO (born 14 September 1948) is an Australian businessman and the former CEO of the International Cricket Council.

Before he entered the world of cricket, he was a barrister in Melbourne. He was originally the chief executive officer of the Australian Cricket Board from 1997 until in 2001, he took up the job of the CEO of the International Cricket Council. In this role, he has worked with four presidents of the ICC: Malcolm Gray, Ehsan Mani, Percy Sonn and Ray Mali. He was succeeded as ICC CEO on 4 April 2008 by Haroon Lorgat.

Speed was put on paid leave until his contract ran out on 4 July 2008 after rumours had been circulating for the last month that he had had a serious falling-out with Ray Mali, the president, following the ICC executive's decision not to take any major action against Zimbabwe following an independent forensic audit carried out by KPMG.

Speed was formerly in charge of the Australian National Basketball League, overseeing the 1996 removal of three teams from the league, and is a member of the NBL Hall of Fame. He was also a board member of the Australian Sports Commission.

Speed is currently a board member of Golf Australia and the Richmond Football Club.

Speed was inducted into the Sport Australia Hall of Fame in 2012.

== In popular media ==
- In 2023, Speed was played by Andrew Blackman in the Warnie mini series.
