= 2020 Chennai Super Kings season =

Indian cricket team

Chennai Super Kings
2020 season
- Coach: Stephen Fleming
- Captain: M.S.Dhoni
- Ground(s): Dubai International Stadium, Dubai
- Most runs: Faf Du Plessis (520 Runs)
- Most wickets: Sam Curran (13 Wickets)

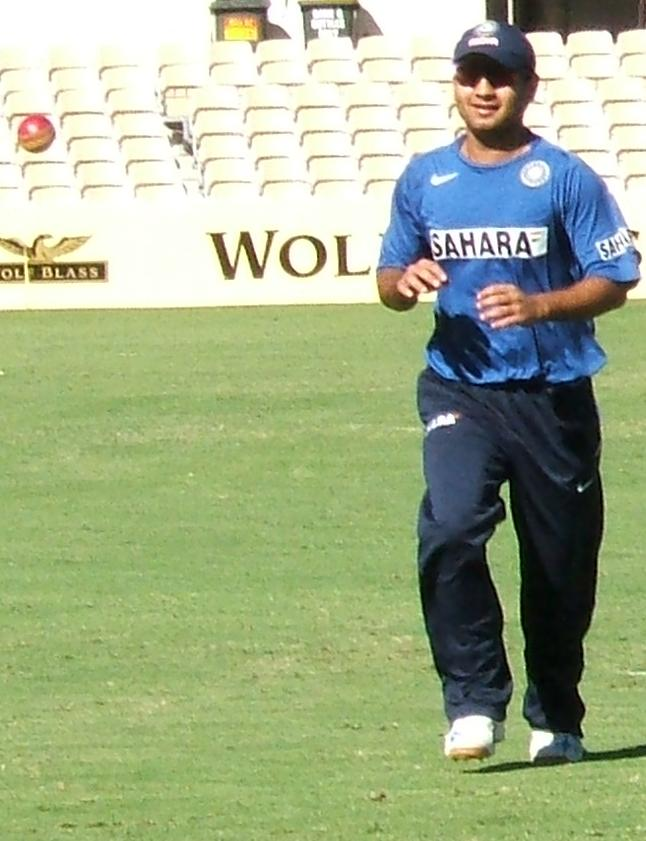
After the auction in 2020, Chawla became the sixth spinner in the team alongside Mitchell Santner, Imran Tahir, Harbhajan Singh, Karn Sharma and Ravindra Jadeja

Chennai Super Kings (CSK) is franchise cricket team based in Chennai, Tamil Nadu, India, which plays in the Indian Premier League (IPL). They were one of the eight teams to compete in the 2020 Indian Premier League. The Super Kings have lifted the IPL title thrice (in 2010, 2011 and 2018), and have the best win percentage among all teams in the IPL (61.28). They hold the records of most appearances in the playoffs (ten) and the Final (eight) of the IPL. They were the only IPL team to qualify for the playoff stage until 2019 of their appearance in the league. The team finished the tournament with 6 wins and 8 losses, failing to qualify for the playoffs for the first time.

== Background ==
=== Player retention ===
The Chennai Super Kings retained 19 players and released five players. CSK have not traded any player in 2020. On 29 August 2020, Suresh Raina has returned to India due to his personal reasons and will miss whole IPL 2020. On 4 September, Harbhajan Singh pulls out the tournament citing personal reasons.

Retained players: MS Dhoni (c), Suresh Raina, Faf du Plessis, Murali Vijay, Ravindra Jadeja, Mitchell Santner, Lungi Ngidi, Kedar Jadhav, Ambati Rayudu, Narayan Jagadeeshan, Harbhajan Singh, KM Asif, Shardul Thakur, Shane Watson, Imran Tahir, Ruturaj Gaikwad, Deepak Chahar, Monu Kumar, Karn Sharma, Dwayne Bravo.

Released players: Sam Billings, David Willey, Mohit Sharma, Dhruv Shorey and Chaitanya Bishnoi.

=== Auction ===
Chennai Super kings entered the IPL 2020 auction with a purse of ₹14.6 crore (US$1.5 million) . CSK got its first buy in the auction of Sam Curran with ₹5.50 crore (US$570,000) . Josh Hazlewood was also sold to their team at his base price of ₹2 crore (US$210,000) & CSK also heavily bidded for Piyush Chawla where they got him for ₹6.75 crore (US$700,000) crore from base price of ₹1 crore (US$100,000) . Aside from these three, CSK purchased Tamil Nadu spinner, R Sai Kishore.

Players bought: Sam Curran, Piyush Chawla, Ravisrinivasan Sai Kishore, Josh Hazlewood.

=== Team analysis ===
ESPNcricinfo' wrote "In the auction 2020, CSK got what they wanted. The team wisely chose Sam Curran and Josh Hazlewood for the Chennai pitch. Although some may say that Piyush Chawla was not included in the team, the franchise may have wanted more experience in the team and there would have been a better balance of Chawla as an alternative to Imran Tahir. Except for the lack of a left-arm fast bowler, the team does not have much problem."

== Indian Premier League ==
On 19 September, the Chennai started their season campaign with a 5-wickets victory over the Mumbai Indians. For Chennai MS Dhoni won the toss & elected to field first. Mumbai scored 162 runs with loss of 9 wickets. Chasing a target of 163, the team had lost two wickets in a first two overs, but Ambati Rayudu (71) and Faf du Plessis (58) brilliant inning and their century partnership (115-run) with Faf du Plessis, helped the Super Kings to beat the defending champions. For Chennai Lungi Ngidi, Deepak Chahar and Ravindra Jadeja took 1-1 wickets.

On 22 September, the Super Kings lost their first match of the season to the Rajasthan Royals by 16 runs. MS Dhoni won the toss and elected to field. Rajasthan cruised past 100, and Sanju Samson posted a 74 off 32 balls before getting out, and Smith also got 69 off 47 balls as Royals posted a daunting 216 at the end of their 20 overs. Jofra Archer 27 in 8 balls and finished strongly for the royals, scoring 30 runs in the last over. Super Kings started off rapidly in their chase, getting 56 runs in the first six overs without losing a wicket. Once again Faf du Plessis got a half-century, and at the end they got to 200/6.

On 25 September, the Super Kings suffered their second successive defeat, to the Delhi Capitals by 44-run. Dhoni won the toss and elected to field. Prithvi Shaw (64 off 43 balls) got the support from Shikhar Dhawan ( 35 off 27 balls) to build a 94-run partnership for first wicket and helped the Delhi finish the inning at 175/3 in their 20 overs. chasing the target of 176, Super Kings got off to a poor start as they lost both their openers quickly, but du plessis ( 43 off 35 balls) and Kedar Jadhav stitched a partnership to keep Super Kings hopes and Super Kings could manage only 131/7 in 20 overs. The team witnessed a roller-coaster ride with just 2 wins and 6 losses.Chennai Super Kings were poorly humiliated against Mumbai Indians by a 10 wicket loss with Trent Boult taking 4 wickets against CSK.CSK next played against Royal Challengers Bangalore and were back in the game with a good performance from Ruturaj Gaikwad who scored a half century to keep CSK alive in the playoff race.However their hopes were broken, when Rajasthan Royals defeated Mumbai Indians, eliminating CSK. However, CSKdefeated Kolkata Knight Riders and played their last game against Kings XI Punjab, the team won by 9 wickets, ending their dismal IPL campaign on a winning note.

=== Preseason ===
On 2 March 2020, at the MA Chidambaram Stadium situated in Chepauk facilitated a large number of Chennai Super Kings (CSK) fans as any semblance of MS Dhoni, Suresh Raina among others players kept preparing for the upcoming period of Indian Premier League (IPL).

=== Offseason ===
The schedule for the league stage of this season were released on 15 February with the Chennai Super Kings playing their first match against the Mumbai Indians on 29 March 2020, away from home at Mumbai.

On 13 March 2020, the BCCI postponed the tournament until 15 April, in view of the ongoing coronavirus pandemic. On 14 April 2020, Narendra Modi said that the lockdown in India would last until at least 3 May 2020, with the tournament postponed further. The following day, the BCCI suspended the tournament indefinitely due to the pandemic.

On 17 May 2020, the Indian government relaxed nation-wide restrictions on sports events, allowing events to take place behind closed doors. On 24 May, Indian sports minister Kiren Rijiju stated that the decision on whether or not to allow the tournament to be conducted in 2020 will be made by the Indian government based on "the situation of the pandemic". In June 2020, the BCCI confirmed that their preference was to host the tournament in India, possibly between September and October. On 24 July 2020, it was confirmed that the tournament would start from 19 September 2020.

In an interview, Dhoni said on the StarSports show,

CSK has helped me improve in every way, whether as a human being or as a cricketer. My CSK has also helped me learn how to handle difficult situations on the field and off the field. Whenever I live in Chennai or anywhere in the South, everyone calls me by the name of Thala, no one calls me in my name. Whenever someone calls me Thala, he shows his love and respect for me.

== Squad ==
- Players with international caps are listed in **bold**.

No.	Name	Nationality	Birth date	Batting style	Bowling style	Year signed	Salary	Notes
Batsmen
3	**Suresh Raina**	India	27 November 1986 (aged 33)	Left-handed	Right-arm off break	2018	₹11 crore (US$1.1 million)	Vice-captain
9	**Ambati Rayudu**	India	23 September 1985 (aged 34)	Right-handed	Right-arm off break	2018	₹2.2 crore (US$228,000)	
1	**Murali Vijay**	India	1 April 1984 (aged 36)	Right-handed	Right-arm off break	2018	₹2 crore (US$208,000)	
13	**Faf du Plessis**	South Africa	13 July 1984 (aged 36)	Right-handed	Right-arm leg break	2018	₹1.6 crore (US$166,000)	Overseas
31	Ruturaj Gaikwad	India	31 January 1997 (aged 23)	Right-handed	Right-arm off break	2019	₹20 lakh (US$21,000)	
All-rounders
8	**Ravindra Jadeja**	India	6 December 1988 (aged 31)	Left-handed	Slow left-arm orthodox	2018	₹7 crore (US$727,000)	
58	**Sam Curran**	England	3 June 1998 (aged 22)	Left-handed	Left-arm medium-fast	2020	₹5.5 crore (US$571,000)	Overseas
Wicket-keepers
7	**MS Dhoni**	India	7 July 1981 (aged 39)	Right-handed	Right-arm medium	2018	₹15 crore (US$1.6 million)	Captain
18	Narayan Jagadeesan	India	24 December 1995 (aged 24)	Right-handed		2018	₹20 lakh (US$21,000)	
Spin Bowlers
36	**Karn Sharma**	India	23 October 1987 (aged 32)	Left-handed	Right-arm leg break	2018	₹5 crore (US$519,000)	
27	**Harbhajan Singh**	India	3 July 1980 (aged 40)	Right-handed	Right-arm off break	2018	₹2 crore (US$208,000)	
99	**Imran Tahir**	South Africa	27 March 1979 (aged 41)	Right-handed	Right-arm leg break	2018	₹1 crore (US$104,000)	Overseas
74	**Mitchell Santner**	New Zealand	5 February 1992 (aged 28)	Left-handed	Slow left-arm orthodox	2018	₹50 lakh (US$52,000)	Overseas
21	**Piyush Chawla**	India	24 December 1988 (aged 31)	Left-handed	Right-arm leg break	2020	₹6.75 crore (US$701,000)	
96	R Sai Kishore	India	6 November 1996 (aged 23)	Left-handed	Slow left-arm orthodox	2020	₹20 lakh (US$21,000)	
Pace Bowlers
47	**Dwayne Bravo**	Trinidad and Tobago	7 October 1983 (aged 36)	Right-handed	Right-arm medium-fast	2018	₹6.4 crore (US$665,000)	
54	**Shardul Thakur**	India	16 October 1991 (aged 28)	Right-handed	Right-arm medium-fast	2018	₹2.6 crore (US$270,000)	
90	**Deepak Chahar**	India	7 August 1992 (aged 28)	Right-handed	Right-arm medium-fast	2018	₹80 lakh (US$83,000)	
22	**Lungi Ngidi**	South Africa	29 March 1996 (aged 24)	Right-handed	Right-arm fast	2018	₹50 lakh (US$52,000)	Overseas
24	KM Asif	India	24 July 1993 (aged 27)	Right-handed	Right-arm fast-medium	2018	₹40 lakh (US$42,000)	
2	Monu Kumar	India	5 November 1994 (aged 25)	Right-handed	Right-arm medium	2018	₹20 lakh (US$21,000)	
38	**Josh Hazlewood**	Australia	8 January 1991 (aged 29)	Left-handed	Right-arm fast-medium	2020	₹2 crore (US$208,000)	Overseas

== Administration and support staff ==
Position	Name
Owner	N. Srinivasan, Rupa Gurunath,
CEO	Kasinath Viswanathan
Team manager	Russell Radhakrishnan
Brand ambassador	Vijay, Nayanthara, Laxmi Rai
Head coach	Stephen Fleming
Batting coach	Michael Hussey
Bowling coach	Lakshmipathy Balaji
Bowling consultant	Eric Simons
Fielding coach	Rajiv Kumar
Physical trainer	Greg King

== Kit manufacturers and sponsors ==
Kit manufacturer	Shirt sponsor (chest)	Shirt sponsor (back)	Chest Branding
SEVEN	Muthoot Group	India Cements	Gulf Oil

T20 uniform

== Teams and standings ==
=== Results by match ===
Round	1	2	3	4	5	6	7	8	9	10	11	12	13	14
Result	W	L	L	L	W	L	L	W	L	L	L	W	W	W
Position	1	4	5	8	6	5	6	6	6	8	8	7	8	7

Source: Fixtures
W = Win; D = Draw; L = Loss

=== League table ===
Pos	Team	Pld	W	L	NR	Pts	NRR	Qualification
1	Mumbai Indians (C)	14	9	5	0	18	1.107	Advance to Qualifier 1
2	Delhi Capitals (R)	14	8	6	0	16	−0.109	Advance to Qualifier 1
3	Sunrisers Hyderabad (3rd)	14	7	7	0	14	0.608	Advance to Eliminator
4	Royal Challengers Bangalore (4th)	14	7	7	0	14	−0.172	Advance to Eliminator
5	Kolkata Knight Riders	14	7	7	0	14	−0.214	
6	Kings XI Punjab	14	6	8	0	12	−0.162	
7	Chennai Super Kings	14	6	8	0	12	−0.455	
8	Rajasthan Royals	14	6	8	0	12	−0.569	

Source: IPLT20.com
The four top ranked teams qualify for the playoffs.

== League stage ==
The full schedule of the 2020 season was published on the IPL website.

=== Matches ===
19 September 2020
19:30 (D/N)
Scorecard

Mumbai Indians; 162/9 (20 overs)	v	Chennai Super Kings; 166/5 (19.2 overs)
Saurabh Tiwary 42 (31); Lungi Ngidi 3/38 (4 overs)		Ambati Rayudu 71 (48); Trent Boult 1/23 (3.2 overs)

Chennai Super Kings won by 5 wickets
Sheikh Zayed Cricket Stadium, Abu Dhabi
Umpires: Chris Gaffaney (NZ) and Virender Sharma (Ind)
Player of the match: Ambati Rayudu (Chennai Super Kings)

- Chennai Super Kings won the toss and elected to field.

22 September 2020
19:30 (D/N)
Scorecard

Rajasthan Royals; 216/7 (20 overs)	v	Chennai Super Kings; 200/6 (20 overs)
Sanju Samson 74 (32); Sam Curran 3/33 (4 overs)		Faf du Plessis 72 (37); Rahul Tewatia 3/37 (4 overs)

Rajasthan Royals won by 16 runs
Sharjah Cricket Stadium, Sharjah
Umpires: Vineet Kulkarni (Ind) and Chettithody Shamshuddin (Ind)
Player of the match: Sanju Samson (Rajasthan Royals)

- Chennai Super Kings won the toss and elected to field.
- Yashasvi Jaiswal (Rajasthan Royals) made his T20 debut.

25 September 2020
19:30 (D/N)
Scorecard

Delhi Capitals; 175/3 (20 overs)	v	Chennai Super Kings; 131/7 (20 overs)
Prithvi Shaw 64 (43); Piyush Chawla 2/33 (4 overs)		Faf du Plessis 43 (35); Kagiso Rabada 3/26 (4 overs)

Delhi Capitals won by 44 runs
Dubai International Cricket Stadium, Dubai
Umpires: K. N. Ananthapadmanabhan (Ind) and Richard Illingworth (Eng)
Player of the match: Prithvi Shaw (Delhi Capitals)

- Chennai Super Kings won the toss and elected to field.

2 October 2020
19:30 (D/N)
Scorecard

Sunrisers Hyderabad; 164/5 (20 overs)	v	Chennai Super Kings; 157/5 (20 overs)
Priyam Garg 51* (26); Deepak Chahar 2/31 (4 overs)		Ravindra Jadeja 50 (35); T. Natarajan 2/43 (4 overs)

Sunrisers Hyderabad won by 7 runs
Dubai International Cricket Stadium, Dubai
Umpires: Anil Chaudhary (Ind) and Paul Reiffel (Aus)
Player of the match: Priyam Garg (Sunrisers Hyderabad)

- Sunrisers Hyderabad won the toss and elected to bat.

4 October 2020
19:30 (D/N)
Scorecard

Kings XI Punjab; 178/4 (20 overs)	v	Chennai Super Kings; 181/0 (17.4 overs)
K. L. Rahul 63 (52); Shardul Thakur 2/39 (4 overs)		Faf du Plessis 87* (53)

Chennai Super Kings won by 10 wickets
Dubai International Cricket Stadium, Dubai
Umpires: Anil Dandekar (Ind) and Nitin Menon (Ind)
Player of the match: Shane Watson (Chennai Super Kings)

- Kings XI Punjab won the toss and elected to bat.

7 October 2020
19:30 (D/N)
Scorecard

Kolkata Knight Riders; 167 (20 overs)	v	Chennai Super Kings; 157/5 (20 overs)
Rahul Tripathi 81 (51); Dwayne Bravo 3/37 (4 overs)		Shane Watson 50 (40); Andre Russell 1/18 (2 overs)

Kolkata Knight Riders won by 10 runs
Sheikh Zayed Cricket Stadium, Abu Dhabi
Umpires: K. N. Ananthapadmanabhan (Ind) and Richard Illingworth (Eng)
Player of the match: Rahul Tripathi (Kolkata Knight Riders)

- Kolkata Knight Riders won the toss and elected to bat.

10 October 2020
19:30 (D/N)
Scorecard

Royal Challengers Bangalore; 169/4 (20 overs)	v	Chennai Super Kings; 132/8 (20 overs)
Virat Kohli 90* (52); Shardul Thakur 2/40 (4 overs)		Ambati Rayudu 42 (40); Chris Morris 3/19 (4 overs)

Royal Challengers Bangalore won by 37 runs
Dubai International Cricket Stadium, Dubai
Umpires: Anil Chaudhary (Ind) and Paul Reiffel (Aus)
Player of the match: Virat Kohli (Royal Challengers Bangalore)

- Royal Challengers Bangalore won the toss and elected to bat.

13 October 2020
19:30 (D/N)
Scorecard

Chennai Super Kings; 167/6 (20 overs)	v	Sunrisers Hyderabad; 147/8 (20 overs)
Shane Watson 42 (38); Sandeep Sharma 2/19 (4 overs)		Kane Williamson 57 (39); Dwayne Bravo 2/25 (3 overs)

Chennai Super Kings won by 20 runs
Dubai International Cricket Stadium, Dubai
Umpires: Anil Chaudhary (Ind) and Paul Reiffel (Aus)
Player of the match: Ravindra Jadeja (Chennai Super Kings)

- Chennai Super Kings won the toss and elected to bat.

17 October 2020
19:30 (D/N)
Scorecard

Chennai Super Kings; 179/4 (20 overs)	v	Delhi Capitals; 185/5 (19.5 overs)
Faf du Plessis 58 (47); Anrich Nortje 2/44 (4 overs)		Shikhar Dhawan 101* (58); Deepak Chahar 2/18 (4 overs)

Delhi Capitals won by 5 wickets
Sharjah Cricket Stadium, Sharjah
Umpires: K. N. Ananthapadmanabhan (Ind) and Richard Illingworth (Eng)
Player of the match: Shikhar Dhawan (Delhi Capitals)

- Chennai Super Kings won the toss and elected to bat.
- Shikhar Dhawan (Delhi Capitals) scored his first century in T20s.

19 October 2020
19:30 (D/N)
Scorecard

Chennai Super Kings; 125/5 (20 overs)	v	Rajasthan Royals; 126/3 (17.3 overs)
Ravindra Jadeja 35* (30); Shreyas Gopal 1/14 (4 overs)		Jos Buttler 70* (48); Deepak Chahar 2/18 (4 overs)

Rajasthan Royals won by 7 wickets
Sheikh Zayed Cricket Stadium, Abu Dhabi
Umpires: Chris Gaffaney (NZ) and Virender Sharma (Ind)
Player of the match: Jos Buttler (Rajasthan Royals)

- Chennai Super Kings won the toss and elected to bat.
- MS Dhoni (Chennai Super Kings) became the first player to appear in 200 IPL matches.

23 October 2020
19:30 (D/N)
Scorecard

Chennai Super Kings; 114/9 (20 overs)	v	Mumbai Indians; 116/0 (12.2 overs)
Sam Curran 52 (47); Trent Boult 4/18 (4 overs)		Ishan Kishan 68* (37)

Mumbai Indians won by 10 wickets
Sharjah Cricket Stadium, Sharjah
Umpires: Vineet Kulkarni (Ind) and Chettithody Shamshuddin (Ind)
Player of the match: Trent Boult (Mumbai Indians)

- Mumbai Indians won the toss and elected to field.

25 October 2020
15:30
Scorecard

Royal Challengers Bangalore; 145/6 (20 overs)	v	Chennai Super Kings; 150/2 (18.4 overs)
Virat Kohli 50 (43); Sam Curran 3/19 (3 overs)		Ruturaj Gaikwad 65* (51); Yuzvendra Chahal 1/21 (4 overs)

Chennai Super Kings won by 8 wickets
Dubai International Cricket Stadium, Dubai
Umpires: Richard Illingworth (Eng) and Chettithody Shamshuddin (Ind)
Player of the match: Ruturaj Gaikwad (Chennai Super Kings)

- Royal Challengers Bangalore won the toss and elected to bat.

29 October 2020
19:30 (D/N)
Scorecard

Kolkata Knight Riders; 172/5 (20 overs)	v	Chennai Super Kings; 178/4 (20 overs)
Nitish Rana 87 (61); Lungi Ngidi 2/34 (4 overs)		Ruturaj Gaikwad 72 (53); Varun Chakravarthy 2/20 (4 overs)

Chennai Super Kings won by 6 wickets
Dubai International Cricket Stadium, Dubai
Umpires: Richard Illingworth (Eng) and Chettithody Shamshuddin (Ind)
Player of the match: Ruturaj Gaikwad (Chennai Super Kings)

- Chennai Super Kings won the toss and elected to field.
- Mumbai Indians qualified for the playoffs as a result of this match.

1 November 2020
15:30
Scorecard

Kings XI Punjab; 153/6 (20 overs)	v	Chennai Super Kings; 154/1 (18.5 overs)
Deepak Hooda 62* (30); Lungi Ngidi 3/39 (4 overs)		Ruturaj Gaikwad 62* (49); Chris Jordan 1/31 (3 overs)

Chennai Super Kings won by 9 wickets
Sheikh Zayed Cricket Stadium, Abu Dhabi
Umpires: Pashchim Pathak (Ind) and Virender Sharma (Ind)
Player of the match: Ruturaj Gaikwad (Chennai Super Kings)

- Chennai Super Kings won the toss and elected to field.
- Kings XI Punjab were eliminated as a result of this match.

== Statistics ==
=== Most runs ===
No.	Name	Match	Inns	NO	Runs	HS	Ave.	BF	SR	100s	50s	0	4s	6s
1	Faf Du Plessis	14	14	2	520	123*	40.36	319	140.75	0	4	1	58	18
2	Ambati Rayudu	12	11	2	359	71	39.88	282	127.30	0	1	0	30	12
3	Shane Watson	11	11	1	299	83*	29.90	247	121.05	0	2	0	33	13
4	Ravindra Jadeja	14	11	6	232	50	46.40	135	171.85	0	1	0	22	11
5	Ruturaj Gaikwad	6	6	2	204	72	51.00	169	120.71	0	3	2	16	6

- Source:Cricinfo

=== Most wickets ===
No.	Name	Match	Inns	Overs	Maidens	Runs	Wickets	BBI	Ave.	Econ.	SR	4W	5W
1	Sam Curran	14	13	42.0	0	344	13	3/19	26.46	8.19	19.3	0	0
2	Deepak Chahar	14	14	52.0	2	396	12	2/18	33.00	7.61	26.0	0	0
3	SN Thakur	9	9	32.2	0	275	10	2/28	27.50	8.50	19.4	0	0
4	Lungi Ngidi	4	4	16.0	0	167	9	3/38	18.55	10.43	10.6	0	0
5	DJ Bravo	6	6	21.0	0	180	6	3/37	30.00	8.57	21.0	0	0

- Source:Cricinfo

== Awards and achievements ==
=== Awards ===
Man of the Match

No.	Date	Player	Opponent	Result	Contribution	Ref.
1	19 September 2020	Ambati Rayudu	Mumbai Indians	Won By 5 wickets	71 (48)	
2	4 October 2020	Shane Watson	Kings XI Punjab	Won By 10 wickets	83* (53)	
3	13 October 2020	Ravindra Jadeja	Sunrisers Hyderabad	Won by 20 runs	25* (10) and 1/21 (3 overs)	
4	25 October 2020	Ruturaj Gaikwad	Royal Challengers Bangalore	Won by 8 wickets	65* (51)	
5	29 October 2020	Ruturaj Gaikwad	Kolkata Knight Riders	Won by 6 wickets	72 (53)	
6	1 November 2020	Ruturaj Gaikwad	Kings XI Punjab	Won by 9 wickets	62* (49)	
