= Jay Shah =

Indian businessman and cricket administrator

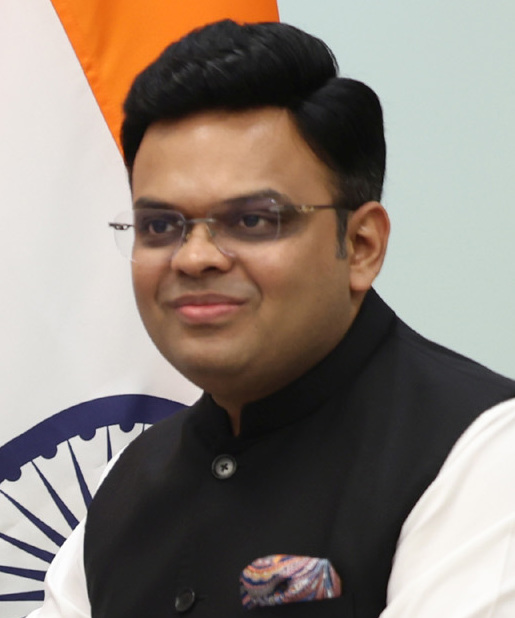

4th Chairman of the International Cricket Council
- Incumbent
- Assumed office 1 December 2024
- Deputy Chairman: Imran Khwaja
- Preceded by: Greg Barclay

28th President of the Asian Cricket Council
- In office 30 January 2021 – 6 December 2024
- Deputy: Pankaj Khimji
- Preceded by: Nazmul Hassan
- Succeeded by: Shammi Silva

Secretary of the Board of Control for Cricket in India
- In office 24 October 2019 – 8 December 2024
- President: Sourav Ganguly (2019—2022); Roger Binny (2022—2024)
- Preceded by: Amitabh Choudhary (interim)
- Succeeded by: Devajit Saikia (interim)

Personal details
- Born: Jay Amitbhai Shah; 22 September 1988 (age 38) Ahmedabad, Gujarat, India
- Spouse: Rishita Patel (m. 2015)
- Children: 3
- Parents: Amit Shah (father); Sonal Shah (mother)
- Education: Nirma University (B.Tech.)
- Occupation: Businessman; Cricket Administrator
- Nickname: Mota Bhai

Jay Amitbhai Shah (born 22 September 1988) is an Indian cricket administrator and businessman, and the chairman of the International Cricket Council (ICC) since December 2024. He was the president of the Asian Cricket Council, establishing himself as one of the most influential figures in global cricket governance. He is the son of Amit Shah, India's Minister of Home Affairs. He is the third Indian to become chairman of the International Cricket Council, after N. Srinivasan and Shashank Manohar.

== Early life ==
Jay Shah was born to Indian Home Minister Amit Shah and Sonal Shah in Ahmedabad, Gujarat, on 22 September 1988.

== Career ==
=== Gujarat Cricket Association (GCA) ===
After being an executive board member of the Central Board of Cricket, Ahmedabad, starting 2009, Shah was made the joint secretary of the Gujarat Cricket Association (GCA) in September 2013. During his tenure as joint secretary, he oversaw GCA's construction of the Narendra Modi Stadium, in Ahmedabad, along with his father Amit Shah who was GCA president at the time.

=== Board of Control for Cricket in India (BCCI) ===
Shah became a member of the finance and marketing committees of the Board of Control for Cricket in India (BCCI) in 2015. He stepped down from the position of GCA joint secretary in September 2019. The following month, he was elected as the secretary of BCCI, the youngest of the five office bearers. In October 2022, Shah was re-elected as Secretary of BCCI.

In 2022, Jay Shah led the BCCI's record breaking Indian Premier League (IPL) media rights deal, where the five-year rights for the league were sold for a total of ₹48,390 crore, making the IPL the second-most valued sporting league in the world (the first is the National Football League) in terms of per match value.

=== Asian Cricket Council (ACC) ===
In January 2021, the Asian Cricket Council appointed Shah as President. In January 2024, Shah was re-elected as Asian Cricket Council (ACC) president. The ACC top spot is rotated among full-members in Asia. It was going to be Sri Lanka's turn next, but Sri Lanka Cricket (SLC) chief Shammi Silva proposed Shah's extension, which the other members accepted.

=== International Cricket Council (ICC) ===
In December 2019, the BCCI selected Shah as its representative for future CEC meetings of International Cricket Council. In April 2022, Jay Shah was also appointed as ICC Board Member Representative and in November 2022, Shah was elected as the head of ICC's all powerful Finance and Commercial Affairs (F&CA) committee at the board meeting.

Shah had also been instrumental within the ICC Olympics Working Group, in sealing cricket's participation in 2028 Olympics. He was a strong advocate of including it in the Commonwealth Games and recent Asian Games, and will now historically be part of the Olympic Games for the first time since 1900.

Jay Shah is the current chairman of the ICC, and commenced his tenure on 1 December 2024. This is following his unopposed election to replace Greg Barclay.

== Personal life ==
In February 2015, Shah married Rishita Patel, his college girlfriend, in a traditional Gujarati ceremony. The wedding was attended by Prime Minister Narendra Modi and other high-ranking public officials. They have three children.

== Controversies ==
=== Continuation of India–Pakistan matches after the 2025 Pahalgam attack ===
Jay Shah, serving as the chairman of International Cricket Council (ICC), has been accused of pressuring Team India into playing Pakistan after the 2025 Pahalgam attack, despite reluctance from within the camp. Sanjay Raut, a member of parliament in India, recently alleged that Shah’s hand forced the decision, turning the match into an obligation rather than a choice.

=== Defamation case against The Wire ===
Shah filed a criminal defamation case and a civil lawsuit of ₹100 crore against the editors of The Wire who, in an October 2017 article, reported that Shah's company's revenue increased 16,000 times one year after Narendra Modi became the Indian Prime Minister. In 2018, the Gujarat High Court restored a gag order, earlier placed by a civil court, on the website, preventing it from publishing any content connecting Shah's alleged businesses to Modi. In August 2019, The Wire withdrew its appeal against the criminal defamation case and announced that it will stand trial.

== Recognitions ==
- On 5 December 2023, The Board of Control for Cricket in India (BCCI) secretary, Jay Shah, was awarded 'Sports Business Leader of the Year', during the Confederation of Indian Industry (CII) Sports Business Awards 2023 for guiding the richest cricket board in introducing a new league (Women's Premier League) and successfully hosting a World Cup at home.
- On 11 May 2023, Jay Shah was awarded 'Game Changer of the Year' at the CNBC-TV18 India Business Leader Awards (IBLA).
- The Indian Express 2024 List of Most Powerful Indians (the IE 100), ranks Jay Shah at #35 most powerful Indian in 2024.
- In August 2024, BCCI Secretary Jay Shah was presented with the 'Excellence in Sports Administration' award at the CEAT International Cricket Awards 2024.
- He has been named as a Young Global Leader of the World Economic Forum class of 2026.

== In popular culture ==
- In 2021, Jay Shah was featured in an episode of History TV18's documentary Modern Marvels; the episode was about the Narendra Modi Stadium's construction.
