= Haroon Lorgat =

South African cricketer (born 1960)

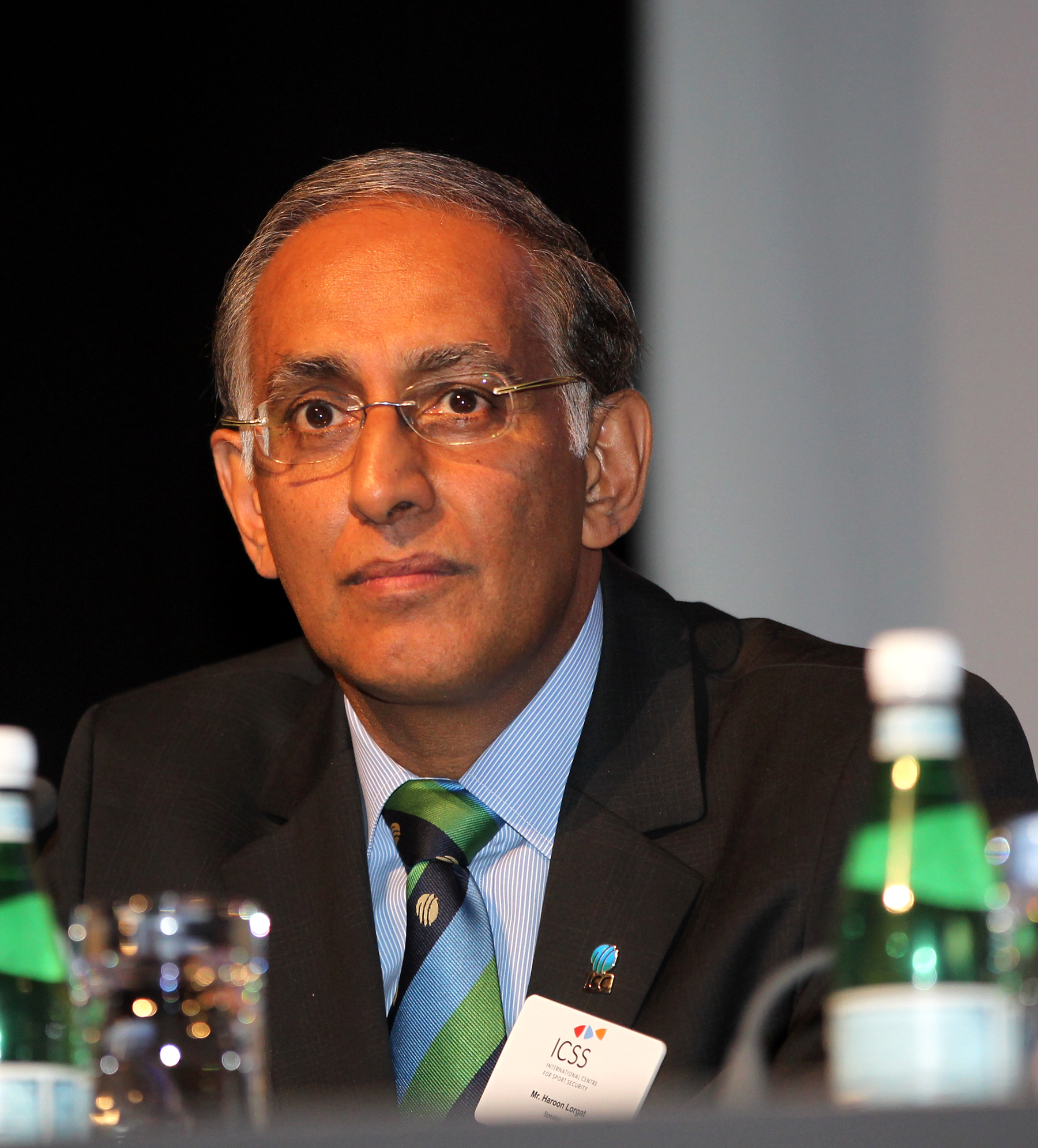
- Lorgat in 2012

Chief Executive Officer International Cricket Council
- In office 4 April 2008 – 28 June 2012
- Preceded by: Malcolm Speed
- Succeeded by: Dave Richardson

Personal details
- Born: 26 May 1960 (age 66) Port Elizabeth, Cape Province, South Africa
- Occupation: cricket administrator, businessman and chartered accountant
- Known for: Former CEO of the International Cricket Council and Cricket South Africa

Haroon Lorgat (Gujarati: હારૂન લોરગાટ; born 26 May 1960) is a South African businessman and chartered accountant. He has been CEO of the International Cricket Council and Cricket South Africa.

== Personal life and education ==
Lorgat is of Indian descent, his family originating from a small village called Manekpore, Rethvania in the western state of Gujarat. Lorgat was raised and schooled in Port Elizabeth. He graduated from Rhodes University with a B.Com. In 1985 he completed training with a Big 4 firm and qualified as a Chartered Accountant. After working at IBM for a year he started his own professional practice in Johannesburg and Cape Town which, through a series of strategic mergers, finally integrated with Ernst & Young in 2002. Prior to his appointment at the ICC, Lorgat was Chief Executive of private equity investment firm Kapela Investment Holdings (based in Cape Town and Johannesburg) that he founded in December 2006. He has been married to Farah Ebrahim since 10 February 1985 and they have two children, Mohamed Zaheer and Naseera.

== Career ==
Following a long career in the audit, accountancy, and tax profession, Lorgat went on to be a cricket administrator. He has returned to the corporate world and is on a number of company boards as an independent non-executive director.

Lorgat played provincial cricket for Eastern Province and Transvaal in the Howa Bowl. He played 76 first class matches between 1974/75 and 1990/91. He was an allrounder and topped the batting averages in the 1985/86 season.

=== Cricket administration ===
Lorgat was formerly a senior partner at EY before being appointed chief executive of the International Cricket Council in April 2008, succeeding Malcolm Speed. Haroon Lorgat stepped down in June 2012. Lorgat was later roped in to join firstly Sri Lanka Cricket (SLC) and then the Pakistan Cricket Board as a consultant. He was the architect behind the current day Pakistan Super League (PSL). In July 2013 he was appointed as chief executive of Cricket South Africa (CSA) and has been lauded for restoring the reputation of cricket and for his excellent work in CSA being recognised as the best run sporting federation in South Africa.

In March 2015, reports indicated that Lorgat had interfered in the selection of the South Africa men's national cricket team that appeared in the semi-final of the 2015 ODI World Cup to ensure that racial quotas were met. While initially dismissing reports of a quota system or any interference in team selection, it was subsequently clarified by Cricket South Africa that the coach and selection convenor has consulted Lorgat, who had “impressed upon them the need to properly consider the best XI, bearing in mind the transformation guidelines”.

In 2016, he was recognised for his leadership by being awarded the SA Sports Industries inaugural Business Leadership award.

In September 2017, Lorgat and CSA "mutually agreed to part ways with immediate effect" because of a "breakdown" in their relationship. Before that Lorgat was supposed to continue as CEO until 2019, however, differences with CSA arose in the handling of the inaugural T20 Global League.

In October 2020, Lorgat joined T10 Sports Management, one of the promoters of the Abu Dhabi T10 League, as Director for Strategy and Development to spearhead growth and development of the ten-over format cricket worldwide. He has since retired from all executive roles in sports administration and currently assists various cricket organisations on a request basis.
