= Sundar Raman =

Indian sports business professional

- Born: 1971 or 1972 (age 53–54); Madurai
- Education: PSG College of Technology; SVKM's NMIMS
- Occupation: CEO - Reliance Sports

Sundar Raman (born 1971 or 1972) is an Indian sports business professional. He is currently working with Reliance Industries Limited as its CEO - Sports.

He was working for the Board of Control for Cricket in India (BCCI) and was the Chief Operating Officer of the highly successful Indian Premier League (IPL) from its inception in 2008 to 2015. Raman was appointed as the IPL COO by former IPL Chairman and Commissioner Lalit Modi in January 2008. He assumed a more powerful position within the BCCI after Modi's ouster in 2010. In November 2015, Raman stepped down as COO of the Indian Premier League. In March 2021, he was named as a consultant by IPL team Chennai Super Kings.

== Personal life ==
Raman was born in Madurai and then brought up by his parents in Trichy and Chennai along with his two elder brothers. He graduated from PSG College of Technology in Coimbatore with a degree in applied sciences. In 1993, Raman got post-graduate management degree in advertising & communications from Narsee Monjee Institute of Management Studies in Mumbai.

== Career ==
Sundar Raman began his professional career in 1995 as a media planner with the erstwhile Hindustan Thompson Associates now J. Walter Thompson. Raman eventually took over as the managing director of Mindshare India, a division of ad group WPP's media agency Group M. In January 2008, Raman delivered a presentation to Lalit Modi, the then Vice President of the BCCI, which eventually led to him being hired by Modi to help him conduct the inaugural edition of the IPL. In February 2008, Raman was officially appointed as IPL COO after a decade in strategic media thinking business working for brands such as Unilever, PepsiCo, Motorola, Samsung and Amex. Along with Modi, Raman was instrumental in shifting the entire IPL T20 cricket tournament to South Africa in 2009. Raman resigned from the post of COO of IPL on 3 November 2015. Shortly afterwards he was appointed as the CEO of Reliance Sport which is part of Reliance Industries Limited. He also owns a 12,5% stake in the increasingly successful SA20, a franchise T20 tournament played annually in South Africa.

== IPL Controversy ==
Raman was at the helm of affairs when the IPL betting and spot-fixing scandal was unearthed in 2013 involving some cricketers, Chennai Super Kings Team Principal and BCCI President, N Srinivasan's son-in-law, Gurunath Meiyappan, Vindu Dara Singh and a few other individuals. Raman maintained the stand that Meiyappan was not a team official during the ensuing investigation conducted by former Chief Justice Mukul Mudgal. But his contention was thereafter rejected by the report filed by the Mudgal committee.

In early April 2014, the court-ordered interim BCCI President for all IPL-related matters, Sunil Gavaskar revealed that he is evaluating Raman's role in the IPL scandal.
