= Rupa Gurunath =

Indian businesswoman (born 1974)

- Born: 1974 (age 51–52)
- Education: PG diploma (Computer Science)
- Occupations: President of TNCA; Director of India Cements Limited
- Spouse: Gurunath Meiyappan
- Parent: N. Srinivasan

Rupa Gurunath is the former president of the Tamil Nadu Cricket Association (TNCA). She was the first woman to hold the office. She is also a 'whole-time' director of India Cements Limited.

== Corporate career ==
Rupa serves on the board of eight different companies, including India Cements Limited, the owners of the Chennai Super Kings Indian Premier League franchise through Chennai Super Kings Cricket Ltd (CSKCL), a holding company.

In 2019, during the 87th Annual General Meeting, Rupa was elected unopposed as president of the Tamil Nadu Cricket Association (TNCA), making her the first woman to head a state cricket association in India. She succeeded her father N. Srinivasan as president. During her tenure, the Tamil Nadu cricket team enjoyed considerable success, winning back-to-back Syed Mushtaq Ali T20 Trophies in 2021 and 2021. However, in June 2021, Rupa was found guilty of 'conflict of interest' by the BCCI ethics officer, retired Justice D. K. Jain, due to her dual role as a "whole-time director and promoter of ICL India Cements Limited", the owners of the Chennai Super Kings IPL franchise. Rupa resigned as the president of the TNCA in December 2021, citing an intention to "focus on business and personal commitments."

== Personal life ==
Rupa is the daughter of Indian industrialist, former president of the BCCI, and former chairman of the ICC, N. Srinivasan.

Rupa is married to Gurunath Meiyappan, a former Chennai Super Kings official and member of the AVM family, who was banned for life from any involvement in cricket for his role in the 2013 IPL betting scandal by the Lodha Committee.
