= List of presidents of the International Cricket Council =

President of International Cricket Council
- Term length: 2 years
- Inaugural holder: (England) Colin Cowdrey
- Formation: 1989
- Final holder: (Pakistan) Zaheer Abbas
- Abolished: 2016
- Succession: Chairman of the International Cricket Council

The president of the ICC was the highest position in the governing body of world cricket. It was largely an honorary position since changes pushed through to the ICC constitution in 2014 handed control to the so-called 'Big Three' of England Cricket Board, Board of Control for Cricket in India and Cricket Australia. In 2016, the position of the president of ICC was abolished, with the Chairman becoming an honorary position. Zaheer Abbas served as the last president of ICC.

== List ==
The following is a list of the presidents of the ICC, the international governing body of cricket.

	Name	Nationality	Term
1.	Colin Cowdrey (Note: As the President of Marylebone Cricket Club. Until 1989, MCC President automatically assumed the chairmanship of the ICC.)	England	1989–1993
2.	Clyde Walcott (Note: As the President of Marylebone Cricket Club. Until 1989, MCC President automatically assumed the chairmanship of the ICC.)	West Indies	1993–1997
3.	Jagmohan Dalmiya	India	1997–2000
4.	Malcolm Gray	Australia	2000–2003
5.	Ehsan Mani	Pakistan	2003–2006
6.	Percy Sonn (Note: Percy Sonn died on May 27, 2007, while still the President of the ICC.)	South Africa	2006–2007
7.	Ray Mali (Note: Assumed the post upon death of Sonn for the remainder of his term.)	South Africa	2007–2008
8.	David Morgan	England	2008–2010
9.	Sharad Pawar	India	2010–2012
10.	Alan Isaac	New Zealand	2012–2014
11.	Mustafa Kamal (Note: Mustafa Kamal resigned from his post making the allegation that the organisation was run unconstitutionally as he was barred from handing out the champion Trophy to Australia in the 2015 ICC Cricket World Cup.)	Bangladesh	2014–2015
12.	Zaheer Abbas (Note: Abbas served as the last president of ICC. In 2016 the position of the president of ICC was abolished.)	Pakistan	2015–2016
