= Lodha Committee =

Supreme court of India appointed committee, 2015

The Lodha Committee was appointed by the Supreme Court of India on 23 January 2015 to analyse and recommend implementable actions for improving the Board of Control for Cricket in India (BCCI), assess the quantum of punishment for Gurunath Meiyappan and Raj Kundra in the Indian Premier League (IPL) betting scandal, and analyse the role of Sundar Raman.

The Lodha Committee report was submitted on 14 July 2015.

== Background ==
The establishment of the Lodha Committee was the result of the report submitted by the Justice Mukul Mudgal Committee in November 2014 before the Supreme Court of India, after an investigation into the 2013 IPL betting scandal.

While analysing the Mudgal Committee report on 22 January 2015, the Supreme Court constituted the Lodha Committee with the following members-

- Justice R.M. Lodha, former Chief Justice of India – Chairman.
- Justice Ashok Bhan, former Judge, Supreme Court of India – Member.
- Justice R.V. Raveendran, former Judge, Supreme Court of India – Member.

The purpose of the Lodha Committee was to analyse and recommend implementable actions for improving the Board of Control for Cricket in India (BCCI), assess the quantum of punishment for Gurunath Meiyappan and Raj Kundra in the Indian Premier League (IPL) betting scandal, and analyse the role of Sundar Raman.

== Lodha Committee Report ==
Lodha Committee presented three main reports. One related with punishment to Raj Kundra and Gurunath Meiyappan was presented on 14 July 2015 while the detailed report with wide and lasting recommendations was presented in December 2015. Through this report, the Committee also gave clean chit to Sundar Rajan.

=== Report on Raj Kundra and Meiyappan ===
In this report, the committee gave punishment of life bans to both Gurunath Meiyappan and Raj Kundra. It also suspended the Chennai Super Kings (CSK) and Rajasthan Royals (RR) franchises from the IPL for the next two years.

=== Report on Sundar Raman ===
Lodha Committee gave clean chit to former IPL Chief Operating Officer (COO) Sundar Raman, citing lack of "cogent evidence" against him.

=== Main Report ===
The report suggested various changes within the BCCI such as the appointment conditions of the CFO and CEO, age of office bearers, advertisements during the IPL matches, and appointment of the Comptroller and Auditor General (CAG) official.

In brief, the Lodha Committee offered the following recommendations--

1. The retirement age to be fixed at 70 years. Any administrator who (a) has criminal charge/s, (b) is of unsound mind, (c) is insolvent, and (d) holds a position in any other athletic association needs to be removed. The tenure of any officer bearer to be fixed for two consecutive terms.
2. The office bearers must not be a minister or government servant and they must have not held office in the BCCI for a period of nine years or three terms.
3. A "one vote per state" policy to make BCCI more transparent in its dealings. recommended the relegation of Railways, Services and Universities as Associate members.
4. BCCI President cannot have a tenure of more than two years.
5. An independent and sovereign governing body for the IPL and limited autonomy for IPL Governing Council.
6. To ensure that BCCI officials are not involved in any betting, they need to disclose their assets to the governing board.
7. recommended legalisation of betting with an inbuilt mechanism.
8. proposed the constitution and establishment of a players association
9. propose creation of an Ethics Officer to decide on conflict of interest.
10. It proposed that the BCCI should come under the purview of the Right to Information (RTI) Act.

== BCCI Response ==
The recommendations of the Lodha Committee shook the BCCI hierarchy and its related associations. The BCCI raised objections to the recommendations and approached the Supreme Court.

In March 2016, the BCCI filed a detailed counter-affidavit in the Supreme Court severely opposing the recommendations of the Lodha Committee report. It opposed majority of the recommendation of the Lodha Committee, including the ‘one person, one post’ rule, age limit and tenure limit, bar on ministers or government servants holding positions in the BCCI and ‘one State, one vote’ rule.

== Supreme Court response ==
The final judgment by the Supreme Court in this matter was delivered on 18 July 2016, which upheld majority of the Lodha Committee recommendations, while modifying or rejecting some of them. This paved the way for a major change within the BCCI.

The major reforms accepted by the Supreme Court included that the BCCI's Working Committee was replaced with a nine-member Apex Council, which included a representative from the Comptroller and Auditor General (CAG). Player associations (including a women’s representative) were also established. The recommendation of One State, One Vote was accepted, so that each state association was given a single vote, removing voting rights from institutional units like Railways, Services, and Universities. An Ethics Officer was to be created to handle conflict of interest issues and to the mandate to disclose assets. The post of Chief Executive Officer (CEO) and professional management teams to run the daily affairs of the board, was accepted. The recommendation of 70 years age cap for officials and strict bar against ministers and government servants holding posts was also accepted.

In contrast, the recommendation to legalize betting in cricket was rejected by the Supreme Court, as being a matter for the legislature. It also rejected the proposal to bring the BCCI under RTI Act, as being a private entity. Unlike the Lodha Committee recommendation, the "cooling off period' was modified in 2018 so that it comes into operation only after two consecutive terms (6 years) on the Apex Council. the recommendation to place heavy restrictions on TV commercials during live match broadcasts was similarly rejected by the Supreme Court.

The Court kept the members of the Lodha Committee to assist in the transition process and gave the BCCI maximum six months to implement the given transition.

== Final Compliance ==
The final implementation of Lodha Committee report was completed on 09 August 2018, when the Supreme Court formally approved the new, finalized BCCI Constitution, as directed by the Court.
