= Shashank Manohar =

Indian cricket administrator

2nd Chairman of the International Cricket Council
- In office 22 November 2015 – 30 June 2020
- Preceded by: Narayanaswami Srinivasan
- Succeeded by: Imran Khwaja (Interim)

29th President of the Board of Control for Cricket in India
- In office 4 October 2015 – 10 May 2016
- Preceded by: Jagmohan Dalmiya
- Succeeded by: Anurag Thakur
- In office 25 September 2008 – 19 September 2011
- Preceded by: Sharad Pawar
- Succeeded by: Narayanaswami Srinivasan

Personal details
- Born: 29 September 1957 (age 69) Nagpur, Bombay State (present–day Maharashtra), India
- Spouse: Varsha
- Children: 1

Shashank Venkatesh Manohar (/ʃəˈʃɑːŋk məˈnoʊhər/; born 29 September 1957) is an Indian lawyer and cricket administrator. He twice served as the president of the Board of Control for Cricket in India (BCCI), from 2008 to 2011, and again from November 2015 to May 2016. He served as the chairman of the International Cricket Council from November 2015 to March 2017. On 24 March 2017, a resolution was passed to reinstate him as the chairman until a successor was elected.

== Personal life ==
Shashank Manohar comes from a "formidable & well-known" family of lawyers. He is the eldest son of Sandhya and VR Manohar. VR Manohar was the Advocate General of Maharashtra during the Chief ministership of Sharad Pawar and also served as the President of Vidarbha Cricket Association in the past. Shashank's paternal grandfather RK Manohar was also a lawyer and was associated with the Bharatiya Jana Sangh and he contested an election on its ticket. Justice M.L Pendse, a judge on the Bombay High Court was his maternal uncle. Shashank's younger brother Sunil Manohar has also served as the Advocate General of Maharashtra. His sister Vasanti Naik is a judge at the Bombay High Court.

Shashank Manohar married Varsha Oka in 1979. Their son Adwait Manohar is a lawyer in Nagpur and currently a vice-president of Vidarbha Cricket Association.

== BCCI first term, 2008–11 ==
During his presidency, India became the number-one-ranked Test side and won the 2011 ICC Cricket World Cup, defeating Sri Lanka by 6 wickets in the final. In June 2010, he suspended IPL commissioner and BCCI vice president Lalit Modi for his misdemeanors relating to the Kochi Tuskers Kerala IPL franchise.

=== Allegations of foreign exchange violations in IPL 2009 ===
In June 2013 the Enforcement Directorate (ED) sent him a notice for adjudication issued against him over allegations of foreign exchange violations in the IPL tournament held in South Africa in 2009, for which he approached the Bombay High Court challenging the notice. His counsel told the Bombay High Court that Lalit Modi who was chairman IPL and vice-president BCCI during IPL in 2009 took all major decisions after approval from the BCCI committee. In response, the Bombay High Court quashed and set aside the notice issued by Enforcement Directorate (ED).

== Between First and Second Term ==
=== BCCI elections September 2013 ===
Manohar lost the BCCI Elections in September 2013 to N Srinivasan. Both the sides fought the elections in an extremely bitter atmosphere, with allegations and counter-allegations leveled against each other, which Srinivas finally won to become the BCCI President.

=== Justice Mudgal Committee ===
In April 2014, the Supreme Court passed an order that forced the then BCCI President N Srinivasan to step aside as the cricket board's president. The Board of Control for Cricket in India (BCCI) called an emergent working committee meeting in Mumbai on 20 April 2014, to decide its future course of action following the Supreme court order. Here Manohar was outvoted 14–1 for the appointment of the proposed Enquiry panel. On 22 April 2014 the Supreme Court rejected BCCI's proposed panel to probe the IPL scam, and appointed a Probe Commission headed by (Retd) Justice Mukul Mudgal to investigate the betting and match fixing scandal in the IPL. The committee also included Additional Solicitor General L Nageswara Rao, advocate Nilay Datta, Deputy DG (Narcotics Control Bureau) BB Mishra, Vidushpat Singhania (Secretary) and the police departments in Delhi, Mumbai and Chennai to assist the investigation.

=== Mudgal Committee Report ===
In November 2014 in response to the final submission of the Mudgal Committee Report, a special bench of the Supreme Court of India issued notices to four key individuals including N Srinivasan and andhis son-in-law Gurunath Meiyappan in connection with the Mudgal report into the 2013 IPL spot-fixing case, which, the court observed, had suggested several "misdemeanours" by the duo.

In view of the court's observation, Manohar urged the BCCI member associations to take a stance. He alleged the BCCI of flouting its own constitution by repeatedly putting off its Annual General Meeting. He complained Srinivasan of remote controlling the BCCI.

=== Lalit Modi allegations ===
Lalit Modi, an Indian businessman, who was the founder and first chairman of the Indian Premier League (IPL), and was banned by the Board of Control for Cricket in India (BCCI) for life on September 25, 2013, made a spate of podcast and media interviews in June 2026. In these interviews, including a detailed interview with ANI Editor-in-Chief Smita Prakash, Modi made several sensational claims against many Congress leaders, including ex Congress President Sonia Gandhi. Modi claimed that his strict crackdown on illegal betting and match-fixing had angered the mafia and the underworld. He claimed that Gandhi had backed the then Minister Shashi Tharoor, who was at the back of Kochi Tuskers, whose matters finally led to Modi's exit from IPL. Modi claimed Tharoor initially "sucked up" to him, visiting his house and making sweet talks to accommodate the franchise arrangements to Sunanda Pushkar in Kochi Tuskers. When Modi allegedly declined to do so, Tharoor allegedly directly threatened Modi with government raids if he questioned the equity structure of the Kochi Tuskers. He even named Sonia Gandhi, claiming that "all guns were trained on me", naming Ahmed Patel, Pranab Mukherjee, and Rajiv Shukla, as pressurizing him to clear the Kochi franchise deal on behalf of Gandhi. He alleged that the then BCCI President Manohar had also asked him to do so, specifically mentioned 10-Janpath pressure.

So far there has been no response from Manohar on this matter.

== BCCI second term, 2015–16 ==
This time, Manohar's candidature had been endorsed by Sharad Pawar, Arun Jaitley and his protege Anurag Thakur, the BCCI secretary. On 4 October 2015, Manohar was elected unopposed as the new president of the BCCI.

== International Cricket Council Chairmanship - 2015–2020 ==
=== Removal of N Srinivasan ===
Srinivasan was removed as the ICC Chairman on 9 November 2015 after the BCCI decided to recall him and it nominated Manohar, its recently elected President as the chief of the world body.

=== Resignation from the post in 2020 ===
Shashank Manohar resigned from the post of chairman of the International Cricket Council (ICC) on 30 June 2020. He held this position for four years and after him, ICC deputy chairman Imran Khwaja was made interim chairman until the election.
