= Percy Sonn =

South African cricket administrator

- Born: 25 September 1949; Oudtshoorn, Cape Province, Union of South Africa
- Died: 27 May 2007 (aged 57); Durbanville, South Africa
- Occupations: lawyer, cricket administrator
- Known for: president of the International Cricket Council

Percy Sonn

6th President of International Cricket Council
- In office 2006 - 2007
- Preceded by: Ehsan Mani
- Succeeded by: Ray Mali

Percival 'Percy' Henry Frederick Sonn (25 September 1949 - 27 May 2007) was a South African lawyer and cricket administrator. Sonn became the sixth president of the International Cricket Council, the most senior role at cricket's world governing body, in July 2006. He was the first ICC president from Africa, serving until his early death.

== Early life ==
Sonn was born in Oudtshoorn, 350 km east of Cape Town, Cape Province in what was then the Union of South Africa, one of seven brothers. He was educated at Belgravia Senior Secondary School, and read law at the University of the Western Cape. He became an attorney and advocate. He worked as a public prosecutor, and as a legal adviser to the South African Police Service, becoming a senior counsel, acting judge, and deputy director of public prosecutions. He was previously chief executive officer of a forensic investigation company.

He formed and headed the Directorate of Special Operations, (nicknamed the Scorpions) responsible for investigating serious offences, including organised crime and drug trafficking.

== Cricket career ==
Sonn played as an off-spinner for Maitland and Parow Cricket Union. He never played first-class cricket. He started out in cricket administration at his local club in Belville, in Cape Town, because he was virtually the only person at the club who could read and write, moving on to become vice president of the non-white Western Province Cricket Board under Hassan Howa from 1974 to 1983, and then president from 1990 to 1992. He was also a vice-president of the racially segregated South African Cricket Board.

Sonn played a crucial role when South Africa returned to world cricket after the fall of apartheid in 1991, and was president of the United Cricket Board of South Africa for three years until 2003. He also served on the UCB's management committee.

He advocated the quota system, to increase the representation of non-white players in the South African cricket team. He overruled the selectors in 2002, directing that (non-white) Justin Ontong should play against Australia instead of (white) Jacques Rudolph.

Sonn became vice-president of the ICC in 2004, and was due to succeed Ehsan Mani as the sixth president of the ICC in June 2005, but Mani's term of office was extended by one year, and Sonn finally took office in 2006. His two year term had been extended by an additional year in March 2007 when the ICC was unable to decide between David Morgan and Sharad Pawar as his successor.

In failing health, he took little part in the 2007 Cricket World Cup after delivering a speech at the opening ceremony in Jamaica.

On 22 May 2007, he was reported to be critically ill at Durbanville Medi-Clinic. He was admitted to intensive care after complications following minor colon surgery the previous day. The surgery had originally been scheduled for February. He died five days later. He was survived by his wife Sandra, and their two sons and one daughter.

== Controversy ==
A controversial figure, particularly over his support for racial quotas in South African national teams, Sonn is felt by many to have been the wrong choice for leadership of the ICC, especially after he was forced to issue a public apology following allegations that he was drunk and disorderly at a 2003 Cricket World Cup game between India and the Netherlands.

According to a report in the South African newspaper Beeld, racing driver Sarel van der Merwe witnessed how Sonn "literally fell out of his pants" and staggered about among the private suites at Boland Park, where the match was being played. The newspaper quoted van der Merwe as saying: "One could see that the chairman of the England and Wales Cricket Board, who was there as his guest, was most embarrassed."

Despite the incident, Sonn became an ICC vice-president in 2004, and succeeded to the presidency two years later.

== Notes ==
Preceded by Ehsan Mani	President of the ICC; 2006-2007	Succeeded by Ray Mali
