= Krish Mackerdhuj =

Southern African chemist, Cricket official, and diplomat

Krish Mackerdhuj (15 August 1939 – 26 May 2004) was a South African chemist, cricket official, and diplomat.

== Early life ==
Mackerdhuj was born on 15 August 1939 in Durban, Natal Province. He attended Sastri College in Durban and later completed the degree of Bachelor of Science at Fort Hare University. He worked as a chemical technologist for Shell and BP.

== Cricket ==
Mackerdhuj played club cricket in Durban but retired due to injury. He umpired nine matches of first-class cricket. In the 1970s and 1980s he was a member of the South African Council on Sport (SACOS), which was recognised as the sporting arm of the anti-apartheid movement. He was president of the multiracial South African Cricket Board (SACB) from 1984 to 1991. In the lead-up to the end of apartheid, Mackerdhuj played a key role in the merger of SACB and the predominantly white South African Cricket Union (SACU). Mackerdhuj was subsequently elected as the first president of the United Cricket Board of South Africa in 1992. Along with Ali Bacher, he successfully lobbied for South Africa to be awarded the hosting rights for the 2003 Cricket World Cup.

== Other activities ==
Mackerdhuj served as South Africa's ambassador to Japan from 1998 to 2003. He was later asked to serve as ambassador to Uzbekistan, but declined the position due to illness.

== Personal life and legacy ==
Mackerdhuj died on 26 May 2004 at St Augustine's Hospital, Durban. He had suffered a mild heart attack two months earlier. He was survived by his wife Sminthra and sons Prashim and Avin.

In January 2011, South Africa hosted India for a one-off Twenty20 International in Durban, the winner of which was awarded the Krish Mackerdhuj Trophy.
