= Dilawar Mani =

Pakistani cricket administrator

Dilawar Mani born in Rawalpindi, Pakistan, is the chief executive officer of Emirates Cricket Board (ECB), the ICC-authorised regulatory authority of UAE cricket. He is the brother of former ICC (International Cricket Council) president and current Chairman of Pakistan Cricket Board Ehsan Mani.
