= Sankarnagar =

Sankar Nagar Thalaiyuthu
- Town Panchayat
- Location in Tamil Nadu, India
- Coordinates: 8°48′34″N 77°43′17″E
- Country: India
- State: Tamil Nadu
- District: Tirunelveli
- Founder: Sankaralinga iyear
- Named for: Sankar Cements
- Elevation: 47 m (154 ft)

Population (2001)
  - Total: 5,067

Languages
  - Official: Tamil
- Time zone: UTC+5:30 (IST)
- PIN: 627357
- Vehicle registration: TN-72

Sankar Nagar or Thalaiyuthu is a panchayat town in Tirunelveli district in the Indian state of Tamil Nadu. It is located about 8 km north of Tirunelveli on the way to Madurai on highway NH 44. The town is popularly called as Sankar Nagar (or Sankarnagar) because of the Sankar Cement factory which initiated settlement in the area.

There are two higher secondary school (Sankar higher secondary school and SJSSGJ Matriculation higher secondary school), 4 cotton mills and one government modern rice mill.

== Climate ==
The region is hot in summer (March, April, May), but the temperature will drop and become cooler during the June, July, August due to the onset of the monsoon winds coming from Arabian Sea. The region receives its rain on October, November.

The region is dry and hot. The nearest river is Thamirabarani located 2.5 km (appx.) away from Thalaiyuthu

== Demographics ==
As of 2001 India census, Sankarnagar had a population of 5,067. Males constituted 51% of the population and females 49%. Sankarnagar has an average literacy rate of 82%, higher than the national average of 59.5%: male literacy is 85%, and female literacy is 79%. In Sankarnagar, 9% of the population is under 6 years of age.

Thalaiyuthu is formed by people migrating and settled from nearby villages, migrated mainly because of the job opportunities provided by India Cements. India Cements has constructed two Residential Colonies, New Colony, Old Colony. These colonies are dedicated for the employees of India Cements. India cements maintain these colonies.

New Colony is located slightly away from the center. India cements provides transport from New colony to center.

Nearby Cities and Towns

- West [Manur (5.0 nm)]
- North [Gangaikondan (5.0 nm)]
- South [Tirunelveli (4.1 nm)]
- East [Palayankottai (5.1 nm)]

Nearby airports

- IATA CODE: FR3242 TUTICORIN SOUTHWEST 18 nm EAST
- IATA CODE:FR3102 KOVILPATTI 22 nm NORTH
- IATA CODE: VOTV TRV THIRUVANANTHAPURAM INTERNATIONAL AIRPORT 51 nm WEST

Railways

- Thalaiyuthu has a railway station, only passenger trains will stop in railway station, There is separate railway line connecting to India Cements for transporting the cements through railways.

Trains that stop in thalaiyuthu are

- Erode - Tirunelveli Passenger Train
- Tirunelveli - Tuticorin Passenger Train
- Coimbatore - Nagercoil Passenger Train

== Industrial development ==
Thalaiyuthu is a region containing limestones in plenty, this formed the basis in establishing India Cements Limited a cement manufacturing company. It was established in 1946 and the first plant was set up in Thalaiyuthu in Tamil Nadu in 1949. It has about seven cement manufacturing plants spread over Southern India catering to major markets in South India and Maharashtra. The capacities of its plants are over 9 million tons per annum.

The famous Indian Premier League "Chennai Super Kings" is currently owned by India Cements located in Thalaiyuthu, who paid US$91 million to acquire the rights to the franchise for 10 years in 2008. N. Srinivasan, Vice-chairman and managing director of India Cements Ltd., is the de facto owner of the Chennai Super Kings, by means of his position within the company. He is also the Secretary of the Board of Control for Cricket in India (BCCI).

The other industrial Activities are quarrying of limestone and cotton mills. There is a rice mill running by the Government of Tamil Nadu situated on the road Tirunelveli-Thalaiyuthu. There are several cotton mill industry located on the road that connects Thalaiyuthu -Tirunelveli. The most famous cotton mills are Nellai Cotton Mill and Subburaj Cotton Mills.

== Employment activities ==
Thalaiyuthu population is mostly dependent upon the direct and indirect employment provided by India Cements Ltd, Limestone Quarries and Cotton Mill industry.

Villages around Thalaiyuthu are as well employed in India Cements Ltd, Thus making Thalaiyuthu a prominent Industrial Center in Tirunelveli District.

== Educational institute ==
Thalaiyuthu has a Sankar Higher Secondary School, GOVT Higher Secondary School, GOVT Primary School. It also has a Matriculation School - Jayendra Golden Jubilee School. (L.K.G - 12 th Standard).

=== Sankar Institute of Polytechnic College ===
This Polytechnic College is best known in Tamil Nadu district for its infrastructure and quality of education. This polytechnic is a self finance college aided by India Cements. This is slightly situated away from the centre, on the road that connects Thalaiyuthu - Nanjankulam.

Approved by AICTE Type of Institution: Self Finance (Aided by India Cements) Category: Co-Education

The courses provided are

1. Diploma in Civil Engineering
2. Diploma in Computer Engineering
3. Diploma in Electrical and Electronics Engineering
4. Diploma in Electronics and Communication Engineering
5. Diploma in Mechanical Engineering
6. Postgraduate Diploma in Computer Applications

== Sports ==
Thaliyuthu has a cricket ground maintained by India Cements. This ground was specifically used for Ranji Cricket. The ground is located near to the Bala Vidyalaya Primary School. The Govt Primary School is a semi circle building with an inclination of steps on its roof, forming the seat for the audience. This was constructed and maintained by India Cements.

The Independence parade will be happening on this school. The school children performance dances, plays drama on that function.

Thaliyuthu has a Shuttle Court, Recreation Club adjacent to the Ranji Trophy Ground.

Many Ranjis are played here on every year.

Table tennis player Veeramanikandan is from this place. He studied in Jayendra school.

U-19 Cricket player Regan is from this place. He studied in St.Xavier's.

== Festivals ==
New year will be celebrated in much grand in the Thalaiyuthu Cricket ground, fireworks will be fired. The Selvi Amman kovil pongal celebration will be happening on the last Tuesday of Thai Tamil Month.
