= Imran Khwaja =

Singaporean cricket administrator

Deputy Chairman of the International Cricket Council
- In office 2017–2026
- Chairman: Jay Shah
- Preceded by: Position established

Chairman of the International Cricket Council (interim)
- In office 20 July 2020 – 23 November 2020
- Preceded by: Shashank Manohar
- Succeeded by: Greg Barclay

Personal details
- Born: Singapore
- Occupation: Cricket administrator, Lawyer

Imran Khwaja (also known as Imran Hamid Khwaja or Imran Khawaja) is a Singaporean cricket administrator and lawyer. He was Deputy Chairman of the International Cricket Council (ICC) from 2017 until 2026. When Shashank Manohar resigned in 2020, Khwaja took over as interim chairman – making him the first person from Singapore to hold this position. Khwaja is concurrently a managing partner at a Singapore law firm, and previously served as president of the Singapore Cricket Association.

== Early life and career ==
Khwaja worked as a lawyer in Singapore, eventually becoming a managing partner at a legal firm.

He became involved in cricket administration locally and was elected president of the Singapore Cricket Association.

== International Cricket Council ==
In 2008, Khwaja was elected to the ICC board to represent the associate members. He later became chair of the Associate Members group.

In June 2017, Khwaja was appointed deputy chairman of the International Cricket Council. After his appointment, he said, "It is an honour to be appointed as the ICC Deputy Chairman... I look forward to working closely with Shashank [Manohar] and the Board to continue the good work and to make a meaningful contribution to the global game."

In July 2020, after Shashank Manohar resigned, Khwaja was named interim chairman of the ICC. This marked the first time someone from an Associate nation had held the chairman's role.

When he took over, Khwaja praised Manohar's work: "Shashank [Manohar] has left the ICC and global cricket in a better place... He has put in place a solid foundation for the future growth and development of the game."

Khwaja was elected to another term as deputy chairman in February 2021. At this time, he was also heading the ICC's Finance and Commercial Affairs (F&CA) committee.

In February 2024, Khwaja was re-elected for another two-year term without any opposition. Jay Shah from the Board of Control for Cricket in India (BCCI) had been expected to challenge him but decided not to run. An ICC spokesperson said, "The ICC Board... unanimously agreed to appoint Imran Khwaja as ICC Deputy Chairman."

In 2026, Khwaja lost his position on the ICC board following re-elections of the Associate representatives.
