= Greg Barclay =

Canadian-New Zealand sports administrator (born 1961)

Greg Barclay CNZM
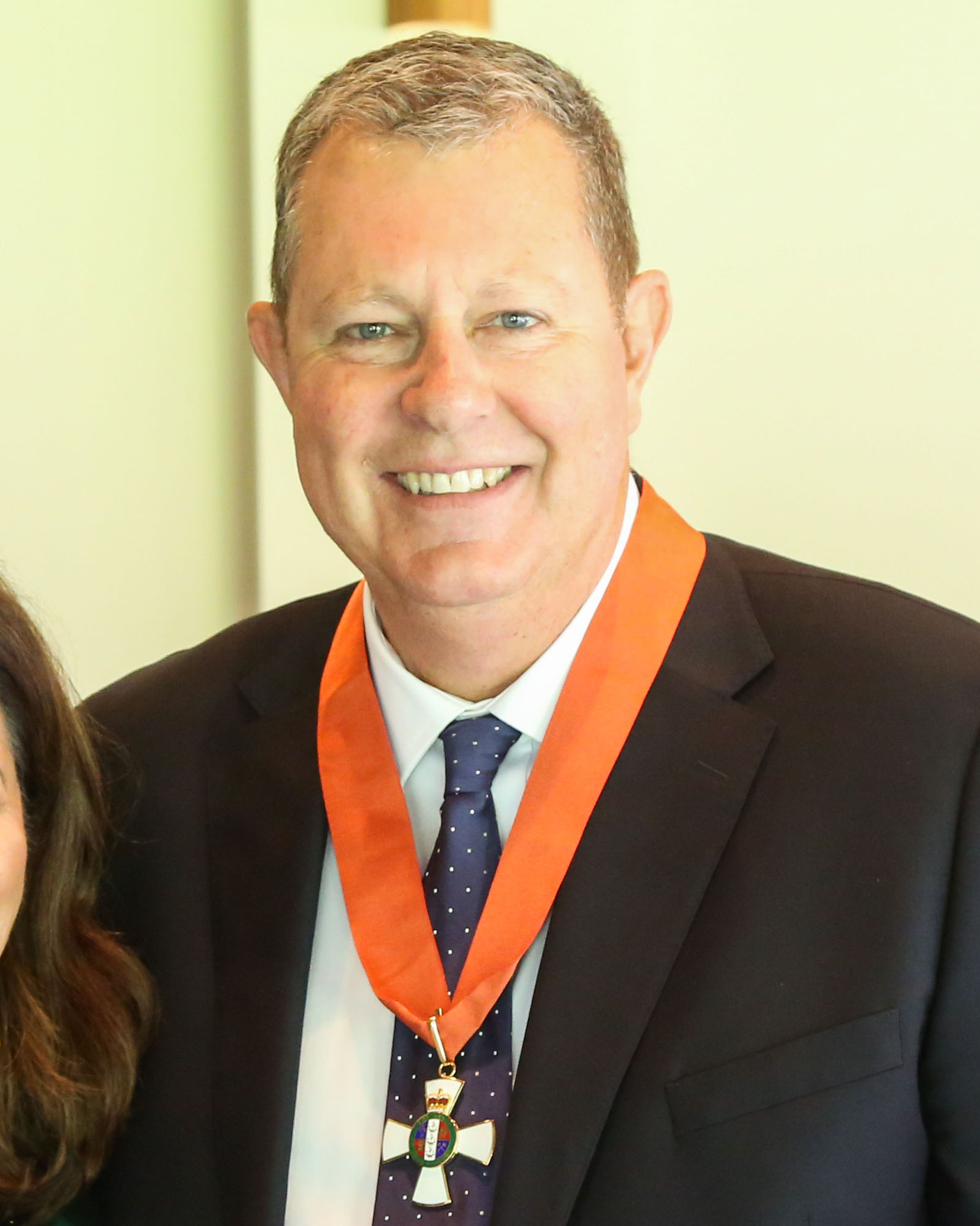
- Barclay in 2026

3rd Chairman of the International Cricket Council
- In office 24 November 2020 – 1 December 2024
- Deputy Chairman: Imran Khwaja
- Preceded by: Imran Khwaja (interim)
- Succeeded by: Jay Shah

Chairman of New Zealand Cricket
- In office 2016–2020

Personal details
- Born: 19 September 1961 (age 64) Hamilton, New Zealand
- Education: University of Canterbury

Gregor John Barclay CNZM (born 1961) is a New Zealand sports administrator who served as the chairman of the International Cricket Council (ICC) from 24 November 2020 to 1 December 2024. He previously served as chairman of the New Zealand Cricket Board from 2016 to 2020.

== Early life and education ==
Barclay was born on 19 September 1961, in Hamilton, New Zealand. He attended the University of Canterbury, where he obtained a postgraduate qualification in business.

Barclay holds dual citizenship in New Zealand and Canada.

== Career ==
Barclay served as the chairman of Northern Districts Cricket before being appointed to the New Zealand Cricket (NZC) board in 2012. He became the chairman of NZC in 2016.

In 2014, he succeeded Martin Snedden as New Zealand Cricket's representative on the International Cricket Council's board of directors.

In 2015, Barclay served as a board member for the 2015 Cricket World Cup, which was co-hosted by Australia and New Zealand.

In November 2020, he was elected as the chairman of the ICC after receiving 11 out of 16 votes in the second round of voting, surpassing the other candidate Imran Khwaja and served there till 30 November 2024. Following his election to the ICC, he resigned from his previous role as the chairman of New Zealand Cricket.

In the 2026 New Year Honours, Barclay was appointed a Companion of the New Zealand Order of Merit, for services to sports governance.
