= India Cements =

Indian cement manufacturing company

The India Cements Limited
- Type: Public
- Traded as: BSE: 530005; NSE: INDIACEM
- Industry: Construction
- Founded: 1946; 80 years ago
- Headquarters: Chennai, Tamil Nadu, India
- Key people: Suresh Vasant Patil (CEO); Krishnagopal Ladsaria (CFO)
- Products: Cement
- Revenue: ▼₹4,138.75 crore (US$440 million) (FY2025)
- Net income: ▼₹−667.56 crore (US$−71 million) (FY2025)
- Total assets: ▲₹13,639.62 crore (US$1.5 billion) (2025)
- Number of employees: 3000
- Parent: UltraTech Cement
- Website: www.indiacements.co.in

The India Cements Limited is a cement manufacturing company based in Chennai. It is the 9th largest listed cement company in India by revenue. The company was headed by former International Cricket Council chairman and Board of Control for Cricket in India president N. Srinivasan.

It was established in 1946 by S. N. N. Sankaralinga Iyer and the first plant was set up at Thalaiyuthu in Tamil Nadu in 1949. It has seven integrated cement plants in Tamil Nadu, Telangana and Andhra Pradesh, one in Rajasthan (through its subsidiary, Trinetra Cement Ltd) and two grinding units, one each in Tamil Nadu and Maharashtra with a capacity of 15.6 million tonnes per annum. Sankar Cement, Coramandel Cement and Raasi Gold are the brands owned by India Cements.

India Cements directly owned the Indian Premier League franchise Chennai Super Kings from 2008. It then transferred ownership to a separate entity named Chennai Super Kings Cricket Ltd., after the Supreme Court of India struck down the controversial amendment to the BCCI constitution's clause 6.2.4 that had allowed board officials to have commercial interests in the IPL and the Champions League T20 on 22 January 2015. India Cements is also alleged to have made controversial investments in Jagati Publications and Bharati Cements owned by Y. S. Jaganmohan Reddy.

== Acquisition of Raasi Cements and Sri Vishnu Cements ==
In 1998, India Cements Limited (ICL) executed one of the most significant hostile takeovers in Indian corporate history by acquiring Raasi Cements and, subsequently, Sri Vishnu Cement. Under the leadership of N. Srinivasan, ICL initiated the bid by strategically accumulating an initial 21% stake in Raasi through open-market purchases and a private deal with a disgruntled relative of the promoter, B.V. Raju. Despite a high-profile defense by Andhra industrial leaders, ICL successfully negotiated a deal in April 1998 to buy Raju’s 32% promoter holding for ₹1.5 billion. This ₹3.8 billion acquisition, advised by DSP Merrill Lynch, made India Cements the second-largest cement producer in the country and gave it a dominant position in the southern market. The consolidation was completed the following year when ICL acquired Sri Vishnu Cements as well, effectively absorbing a total production capacity of approximately 3 million tonnes and marking a major shift in the industry's landscape.

== Acquisition by UltraTech Cement ==
In July 2024, UltraTech Cement acquired a majority stake in India cements. However, there will be no change in ownership of Chennai Super Kings as it has been functioning as an independent entity.
