= Manekpore =

Coordinates: 20.791484°N 73.127339°E

Manekpore - Rethvania is a village in the state of Gujarat in western India off Indian National Highway 8 pincode IS 396560 on Vansda Road from where you can travel to ahwa, via waghai, and vansda, and to the hill station of Saputara.The most likely match given context is in Navsari district, and another in Surat district (Bardoli taluka).

== Population ==
The village population consists of Hindus and Muslims. Unofficial records state the population of this village is approximately 2,500. Many people from the village have emigrated abroad and have now settled in Africa, France (Overseas France not in the European metropole), Portugal and the United Kingdom.

== Facilities ==
Some of the facilities that can be found in the village include a state primary school, Post Office, telephone booths, a doctor's surgery and dispensary. Place of worship in the village include two mandirs, two mosques, Mix Muslim madrassa, orphan Muslim boys school (charitable trust), orphan Muslim girls school (charitable trust) sponsored by Haji Murad Ali Patel (al Murad) United Kingdom, teenage Muslim girls school (charitable trust) premises sponsored by laher bro's United Kingdom, South Africa .

== Occupation ==
Most of the people in the village are middle-aged and Agriculture is the main form of occupation with some of that also is dying out and many landowners are leasing their land out to other farmers from other states. Only a handful of hard-working families are still farming rice, wheat, growing sugarcane and mangos during their respective growing seasons. The canal is utilised for the irrigation process. A few people run grocery shops for their livelihood. Nowadays it has also become a trend in buying/ selling cars, auto rickshaws, motor bikes and so on.

== Borders ==
Manekpore borders Rethvania, Alipore - gujarat, Adharpeer, Bamanvale, Harangam and Rankuwa. Nearby villages are easy to get to via local transport infrastructure. The nearest small towns are rankuwa and Chikhli, Gujarat and The nearest big towns are Bilimora and Navsari. The nearest cities are Surat and Valsad. The nearest airport is Chhatrapati Shivaji International Airport, Mumbai.
