= Zaheer Abbas =

ICC president & Pakistani cricketer (born 1947)

Zaheer Abbas ظہیر عباس PP
Personal information
- Full name: Syed Zaheer Abbas
- Born: 24 July 1947 (age 79); Sialkot, Punjab, British India
- Batting: Right-handed
- Bowling: Right-arm offbreak

International information
- National side: Pakistan (1969-1985)
- Test debut (cap 63): 24 October 1969 v New Zealand
- Last Test: 27 October 1985 v Sri Lanka
- ODI debut (cap 13): 31 August 1974 v England
- Last ODI: 3 November 1985 v Sri Lanka

Career statistics
| Competition | Test | ODI | FC |
|---|---|---|---|
| Matches | 78 | 62 | 457 |
| Runs scored | 5,062 | 2,572 | 34,843 |
| Batting average | 44.79 | 47.62 | 51.54 |
| 100s/50s | 12/20 | 7/13 | 108/158 |
| Top score | 274 | 123 | 274 |
| Balls bowled | 370 | 280 | 2,582 |
| Wickets | 3 | 7 | 30 |
| Bowling average | 44.00 | 31.85 | 38.20 |
| 5 wickets in innings | 0 | 0 | 1 |
| 10 wickets in match | 0 | 0 | 0 |
| Best bowling | 2/21 | 2/26 | 5/15 |
| Catches/stumpings | 34/– | 16/– | 278/– |
- Source: CricketArchive, 6 November 2005

President of International Cricket Council
- In office 2015–2016
- Preceded by: Mustafa Kamal
- Succeeded by: Office abolished

Syed Zaheer Abbas Kirmani PP, (in Punjabi and Urdu: سید ظہیر عباس کرمانی; born 24 July 1947), popularly known as Zaheer Abbas, is a Pakistani former cricketer. He is among the few professional cricketers who used to wear spectacles in the cricket ground. In 1982/1983, he became the first batsman to score three consecutive centuries in one-day internationals. Sometimes known as 'the Asian Bradman', Zaheer Abbas is regarded as one of the finest batsmen in the history of cricket. In August 2020, he was inducted into the ICC Cricket Hall of Fame.

== Cricket career ==
Abbas made his Test match debut in 1969; in his second Test he scored 274 against England, which is still the sixth-ever highest score by a Pakistani batsman. This was the first of his four Test double-centuries; only two men from Pakistan (Younis Khan and Javed Miandad) have scored more. The last was an innings of 215 against India in 1983, the first of three centuries in consecutive Tests, and his hundredth first-class century; Abbas and Geoffrey Boycott are the only two batsmen to have scored their hundredth first-class century in a Test match.

Abbas had great success in first-class cricket, and is the only Asian batsman to score one hundred first-class centuries. He had a long stint with Gloucestershire; joining the county in 1972, he remained there for thirteen years. During that time he scored over a thousand runs in the majority of his thirteen seasons. He also made over two thousand runs in a single season on two occasions for the club (1976 and 1981). During those thirteen years at Gloucestershire, he played 206 first-class games, scoring over 16,000 runs. He averaged 49.79, hitting 49 hundreds and 76 fifties. Abbas is the only player to have scored a century and double century in a first-class match four times, finishing each of the eight innings not out.

Sunil Gavaskar, the former Indian Test captain, once said while commentating that the Indian players would often say to Zaheer, "Zaheer Ab-bas karo", which means "Zaheer, stop it now" in Urdu and Hindi, referring to Abbas' free scoring.

Abbas had two stints as captain of the national team in 1981 and 1984. He retired from international cricket in 1985, and has officiated as a match referee in one Test and three ODI matches. He has also worked as the manager of the national team. Zaheer was one of the players who was famous for his title. In 2018 Government of Pakistan awarded him Sitara-e-Imtiaz. In 2015 he became ICC president, the third cricketer after Colin Cowdrey and Clyde Walcott, to hold the post.

Zaheer Abbas held the record for scoring the most runs by any batsman in a 4 match bilateral ODI series (346 runs) from 1982 to 2015. The record was broken by Hashim Amla of South Africa in 2015.

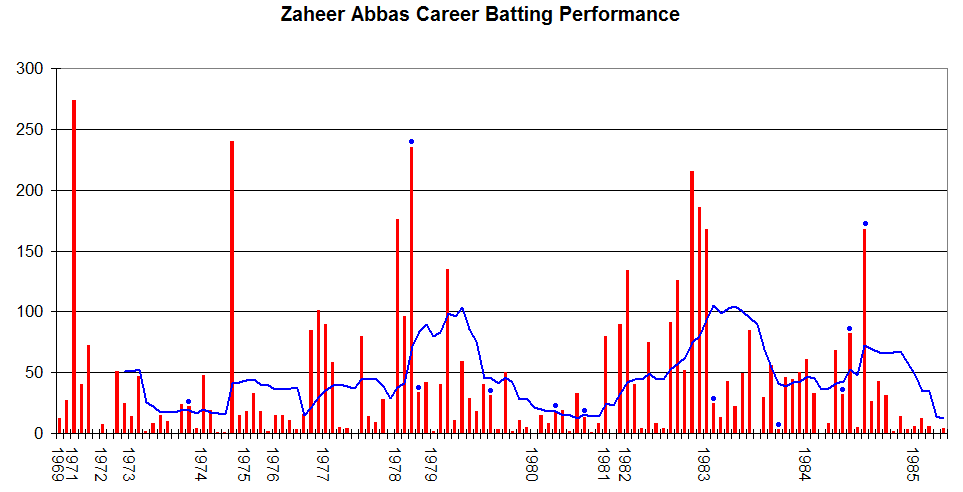
Zaheer Abbas's career performance graph.

== Playing style and legacy ==
In 2001, Agha Akbar portrayed Zaheer Abbas as a lyric, fluent stroke-maker defined by precision and timing: a high, elegant backlift and supple, powerful wrists let him switch seamlessly between back and front foot, even mid-stroke, and thread gaps to score a high proportion of boundaries. His 274 at Edgbaston in only his second Test is cited as a breakthrough that dispelled doubts about his technique in seam-friendly conditions, showcasing prolonged concentration and effortless control over nine hours at the crease.

In a 2010 tribute, Alastair Hignell portrays Zaheer Abbas as a classically upright and elegant batter with razor-sharp reflexes, a high, twirling backlift, and late, wristy stroke-play that made run-scoring look effortless; despite spectacles, he is described as seeing the ball early and threading gaps with authority. Nicknamed the "Asian Bradman", Abbas made four double hundreds among his 12 Test centuries, including 274 at Edgbaston in 1971 and 240 at The Oval in 1974, and, for Gloucestershire, uniquely compiled a double-century and a hundred in the same match on four occasions (all eight innings unbeaten), feats achieved despite three-day county games and first-innings over limits.

In a 2013 statistical analysis, S Rajesh highlights Virat Kohli’s exceptional ODI record at No. 3: by Oct 2013, ten of his 16 ODI centuries had come from that position, yielding a century every 7.1 innings, around three times better than the average No. 3 (one every ~25 innings; ~20 since 2010). The only other No. 3 with a sub-8 rate is Zaheer Abbas, who scored six hundreds in 47 innings at No. 3 (7.83 innings per hundred), averaging 45.65 with a strike rate of 85.74 at that position (career ODI: 47.62 at 84.80).

In a 2015 contribution, Kamran Abbasi lauds Zaheer Abbas’s batting as classically elegant all around the wicket, especially his cover drive, emphasizing his tall reach, brief shuffle then poised stillness at the crease, and late, wristy stroke-play that threaded off-side gaps and flicked straighter balls to leg. He argues Abbas was difficult to bowl to and, despite a refined long-form reputation, scored at a tempo suited to one-day cricket, excelling particularly against spin. AA his peak, Abbas is noted as having some vulnerability to short fast bowling, contextualized by the pre-helmet era’s harsher conditions.

In 2019, Osman Samiuddin included Zaheer Abbas in an all-time Pakistan World Cup XI, at No. 3, arguing he was ahead of his era as an ODI batter: in the mid-1970s to mid-1980s, his strike rate was close to 85, among players with 1000+ ODI runs, trailing only Kapil Dev and Viv Richards, underscoring his modern scoring tempo.

Writing in 2020 about Pakistan's five most stylish batsmen, Shamya Dasgupta depicts Zaheer Abbas as an almost "perfect" right-hand batter, classical, fluent and reliable, whose elegance did not diminish his productivity. He averaged 44.79 in Tests overall, rising to 56.06 in England (and 40.62 in Australia), and was famed for boundary-laden innings that sliced through attacks "like a knife through butter." Cast as the stylistic foil to Viv Richards, precision and silk versus power, Abbas, he argues, mesmerised spectators with timing, placement and effortless stroke-play.

== Personal life ==
Zaheer Abbas married Indian born Rita Luthra (now known as Samina Abbas) in 1988.

His first marriage was to Najma Bokhari with whom he has three daughters, Rudabah, Roshana and Hiba.

== Autobiography ==
In 1983 he co-wrote his autobiography Zed with the British cricket journalist David Foot.

== Awards and recognition ==
- Pride of Performance Award in 1971 by the Government of Pakistan
- Inducted in ICC Cricket Hall of Fame in 2020.
- Inducted in PCB Hall of Fame in 2021.

Sporting positions
| Preceded by Javed Miandad | Pakistan Cricket Captain; 1981–1982 | Succeeded by Imran Khan |
| Preceded by Sarfraz Nawaz | Pakistan Cricket Captain; 1984–1985 | Succeeded by Imran Khan |
| Preceded by Mustafa Kamal | President of the ICC; 2015–2016 | Succeeded by Position abolished |
