= Cricket South Africa =

Cricket body of South Africa

- Sport: Cricket
- Jurisdiction: South Africa
- Abbreviation: CSA
- Founded: June 29, 1991; 35 years ago
- Affiliation: International Cricket Council
- Affiliation date: 1909; 117 years ago
- Regional affiliation: Africa Cricket Association
- Affiliation date: 1997; 29 years ago
- Headquarters: Johannesburg, Gauteng, South Africa
- Location: Johannesburg
- President: Rihan Richards
- Chairperson: Pearl Maphose
- CEO: Pholetsi Moseki
- Director: Enoch Nkwe
- Secretary: Viwe Mngambi
- Replaced: United Cricket Board of South Africa

Official website
- www.cricket.co.za
- (South Africa)

Cricket South Africa (CSA) is the governing body for both professional and amateur cricket in South Africa. In 1991, the separate South African Cricket Union and the South African Cricket Board merged to form the United Cricket Board of South Africa, ending racial separation governance in South African cricket. Cricket South Africa was formed in 2002, and initially ran parallel to the UCB, before becoming the sole governing body in 2008. As an affiliate of the South African Sports Confederation and Olympic Committee, and a full member of the International Cricket Council, CSA administers all levels of cricket in South Africa, including the national teams in all three formats for both men and women.

== History ==
=== Background ===
Organised cricket has been taking place in South Africa since the British first introduced the sport in the 1880s. South Africa became the third Test-playing nation after England and Australia when the England team toured the country in 1888-89, playing their first Test match at Port Elizabeth.

Since 1890, various national bodies have formed and governed cricket in South Africa. Originally, this was along separate racial lines and South Africa regularly played only against the other white teams of England, Australia and New Zealand. In 1970, after recent incidents such as the D'Oliveira affair, the ICC imposed an cricketing ban on South Africa in response to its domestic policy of apartheid and its refusal to field non-whites or play non-white teams. The Test careers of players were cut prematurely short, some of whom later emigrated and played for other nations.

During South Africa's expulsion from international cricket, a number of different organisations ran domestic cricket depending on the various racial groups. The South African Cricket Association (SACA) administered white players, with the South African Cricket Board of Control (SACBOC) and the South African African Cricket Board (SAACB) administering the different non-white racial groups. The cricketing boycott had a significant impact on the domestic game. Standards, attendances, and participation fell, and South African expulsion meant that domestic cricket became deprived of new revenue streams.

As South African cricket continued to be excluded, ‘Rebel Tours’ (unofficial international teams coming to South Africa to play), were organised by the SACU during the 1980s. Despite disapproval by international cricket boards, national governments and the ICC, seven tours were staged in South Africa between 1982 and 1990. Players who joined ‘rebel tours’ ran risks to their own careers and reputations. Many faced ostracization when they returned home, as well as a cricketing ban. The SACU offered money as an incentive for Rebel Teams to tour. Teams from England, Australia, and also the West Indies and Sri Lanka played 19 Tests and numerous One Day Internationals between them against South Africa in these unofficial tours.

In June 1991, the United Cricket Board of South Africa (UCB) was established following the unity process and the amalgamation of the SACU and the SACB, ending racial segregation within South African cricket. Former SACB president Krish Mackerdhuj was elected as the inaugural UCB president. In July, South Africa was readmitted as a full member of the ICC.

In 2002, Cricket South Africa (CSA) was formed and operated in conjunction with the UCB. CSA was responsible for and administered the professional game, and the UCB oversaw amateur cricket in South Africa. In 2008, CSA and the UCB merged, reportedly for tax reasons, with CSA becoming the sole governing body for both professionals and amateurs.

=== Mismanagement ===
In recent years, Cricket South Africa was rocked by significant amounts of turmoil and disorganisation that has caused notable reputational harm, both at home and abroad.

In 2012 Gerald Majola, CEO of CSA since 2000, was suspended and later dismissed following a scandal into unauthorised bonuses. An internal investigation had initially exonerated Majola of any wrongdoing. However a government inquiry later found that he, and several other staff members, had failed to declare a collective US$671,428 in bonuses after South Africa hosted the 2009 IPL and Champions Trophy. Both CSA President Mtytzeli Nyoka and his acting replacement, AK Khan, resigned in the aftermath of the scandal. The government inquiry subsequently recommended that CSA should be restructured.

Haroon Lorgat, CEO since 2013, 'mutually agreed to part ways with immediate effect' from CSA in September 2017 after his position became untenable following allegations that he had deliberately withheld critical financial information from the board of directors. Lorgat had been embattled with the CSA board over the financial expenditure of the now abandoned Global League T20. With tournament outlay alone totaling US$330,000 between May 2016 and April 2017, the league had yet to secure a broadcaster and title sponsor a month before the competition was due to start.

Under Thanang Moroe, CEO from 2017 to 2020, Cricket South Africa spiraled into numerous crises. A series of high-profile controversies and disagreements with the South African Cricketers Association relating to league restructuring, broadcasting rights, and various administration issues overtook CSA. In December 2019 Moroe was suspended, and later dismissed, following an independent forensic report that had uncovered multiple incidents of financial dishonesty where board money had been paid to private companies for a service that was never delivered. Throughout this time, CSA had refused to publish the final non-redacted Funduszi Report that had investigated alleged wrongdoing and negligence dating back to 2016 within the organisation. As a consequence, in October 2020 the entire Board of Directors resigned with immediate effect. The South African Sports Confederation and Olympic Committee (Sascoc) announced that they had suspended Cricket South Africa due to "maladministration and malpractices", and had taken over cricketing operations in the country. The acting CEO since July 2020, Kugandrie Govender, (the first woman in the position) herself was suspended four months later, pending the outcome of a hearing into allegations of misconduct during her time as Chief Commercial Officer, as well as acting CEO. She was later dismissed with immediate effect in July 2021. Following an unfair dismissal hearing that Govender brought forward with the South African Labour Court, CSA and Govender reached an out-of-court settlement.

In January 2021, Cricket South Africa appointed Pholetsi Moseki, the former CFO, as acting CEO - the third CEO since the beginning of 2020. In April, the interim board and the Members Council reached an agreement over organisational reforms at the eleventh hour after the South African Government threatened to defund the organisation and remove recognition for all the country's national teams - effectively ending organised cricket in the country. The International Cricket Council had also announced that it could suspend South Africa due to government interference in the sport, which is against ICC rules. Zimbabwe Cricket has twice been suspended for political intervention by the ICC, most recently in 2019.

=== New era ===
In June 2021, a new board of directors was appointed. For the first time, the majority of the board was made up of independents (i.e., outside CSA current administrative or operational circles). A key focus of the new board has been rebuilding relations with all stakeholders (internal and external), and stabilising operations by recruiting for vacant positions in what had previously been a severely depleted management team, including several key executive positions.

== Organisation ==
=== Structure ===
CSA is governed by two internal organisation structures with a joint purpose of delivering responsible administration of the game, as well as to nurture sustainable growth and business investment for South African cricket.

The highest decision-making body at CSA is the Members Council, which is formed by the 14 affiliate presidents plus the president and vice president of CSA, who were themselves elected from the ranks of the affiliate presidents, to make a total of 16. The affiliates administer amateur and senior provincial cricket in their respective regions, i.e. Northern Cape, Free State, KwaZulu-Natal, etc. The Members Council sets general policy for CSA.

In terms of CSA's Memorandum of Incorporation ("MOI"), the board is currently composed of five non-independent directors (who are presidents or representatives of affiliates, and therefore involved with cricket) and eight independent directors, i.e, persons who, apart from their CSA directorships, are not involved with cricket. Independent directors were selected and nominated for appointment by persons were also independent of CSA. The term of office for directors is three years, and a director is eligible for elections for an additional three-year term. Strategic direction of the organisation and management of daily operations is the primary responsibility of the Board of Directors, and is performed through CSA committees and internal control procedures.

Throughout, close consultation is kept with the South African Cricketers Association (SACA), who represent the interests and welfare of the players.

=== Transformation ===
CSA maintain that their continued vision is to ensure that cricket is supported by the majority of South Africans, and that the game is available to all. Although a previous racial quota was repealed in 2007, since 2016 ‘transformation’ targets, although highly controversial, have been set by CSA in order to ensure that more South Africans of colour achieve greater representation at the national level. The percentage of black African players required in a team currently stands at 25%, up from 18% the previous season. In 2021–22, this was to increase to 27% and in 2022–23, it was to sit at 33%. Overall, the numbers of players of colour required was to increase to 63% by 2022–23, from 58%. National teams must field six players of colour, of which at least two must be black African. These quotas however are for an average across the course of a season and are not enforced for individual matches.

A further memorandum had stated from August 2020 that white consultants would no longer be appointed by CSA, unless a person of colour could not be found during the recruitment process. In January 2021, it was announced by the interim board that all previous transformation targets adopted by CSA, including the affirmative action against hiring white consultants, would be suspended for the foreseeable future.

== National teams ==
=== Men's ===
Test - Having hosted and played their first international first-class game against England in 1888–89, South Africa developed into a competitive team by the start of the 20th century. The team continued play international until 1970, when they were banned from the ICC due to apartheid. In 1991, at the request of Nelson Mandela, they were readmitted into the ICC. Their first test since readmission occurred between 18-23 April 1992. On 16 June 2025, South Africa won the 2023–2025 World Test Championship Final at Lord's Cricket Ground, making it their second ICC men's senior trophy and their first since 1998. Hence, they were awarded the ICC Test Championship Mace for the first time since 2015.

ODI - South Africa have reached the ODI World Cup Semi-Finals four times, most recently in 2023, but never progressed further. They are hosting the 2027 edition along with Zimbabwe and Namibia.

T20I - Appearing in all 10 T20 World Cups, the Proteas have been semi-finalists thrice, most recently in 2026 and finalists in 2024 losing to India. They hosted the inaugural 2007 World Twenty20.

=== Women's ===
Test - Making their debut in 1960 against England, the women's team did not play any international fixtures between 1972 and 1997. The Proteas have played just 13 Test matches, with the most recent being in 2022, and winning only one. With a win rate of only 8% as of 2021, T20 has taken on a far more prominent and financially rewarding role, almost ending women's Test cricket as a viable entity.

ODI - The women's team played their first One Day International against Ireland in 1997, and have a win rate as of 2026 of roughly 55% over around 270 matches. Playing in six Women's World Cups, the Proteas have been semi-finalists twice, in 2000 and 2017 and finalists in 2025 but later lost to India.

T20I - The Proteas' first T20I was in 2007 against Australia, and have since played over 100 matches. Competing in 9 Women's T20 World Cups, South Africa have been semi-finalists in 2014 and in 2020. They were runner ups in 2023 and 2024.

== Domestic competitions ==
CSA organises and oversees a range of domestic competitions within the country. In 2021, Cricket South Africa announced a return to the traditional province based domestic structure. 15 first-class teams now play in two divisions, determined by promotion and relegation. Eight teams make up the first division, with 16 contracted players each, and seven teams the second division, with 11 contracted players each. It is hoped that wider selection of teams at the highest domestic level will help increase playing opportunities of all races, particularly those currently underrepresented.

South Africa's major domestic competitions are:

First Class - CSA 4-Day Series

List A - CSA One Day Cup

T20 - CSA T20 Challenge / SA20

For women, CSA Provincial Cricket is currently the top level of cricket in South Africa, however it remains semi-professional. Since 2019, South African women have played in the Women's T20 Super League. CSA have said that the competition will allow top performing players from across the under-19s and provincial cricket to continue and improve domestic standards.

== Development, youth and grass roots ==
Cricket South Africa offers programmes that cover the development of the amateur and professional game, for both men and women. CSA provides regional and district programmes, often via their Performance Centres. Starting at the ages of four to thirteen, more than 126,000 school children have participated in the KFC Mini-Cricket programme, while the number of coaches and schools participating has increased to nearly 14,000 and 7,000 respectively.

National inter-provincial tournaments are played at under-13, under-15, under-17 and under-19 levels for boys, and at under-15 and under-19 levels for girls. Through the Talent Acceleration Programme, the best players can be identified, particularly disadvantaged cricketers. Initiatives are available that provide financial support for deprived young cricketers, through the Sunfoil Education Trust (SET), the Momentum Bursary Trust, and the SASCOC Bursary Programme. From Youth to International progression, CSA provides support through Provincial and Regional Academies, as well the National Academy and the High Performance Centre.

== Finances and sponsorship ==
In the years before COVID-19 in South Africa, CSA had reported a declared loss of R200m for the 2018-19 financial year, and profit of R50m for 2019–20. Due to the pandemic, as well as organisational instability, CSA forecasted major losses of R654m (£32m) by the end of its four year in 2022 due to the effect on hosting tours, introducing the Mzanzi Super League, and restructuring the domestic game. Whilst the SA Cricketers Association puts that figure closer to R1bn (£50m), CSA now project a revised figure of R400 (£19m) due to tours going ahead and new sponsorship agreements. So far, CSA has not undertaken any job or pay cuts and has reported cash reserves of R800m (£39m). CSA have agreed a broadcast deal with Star India in November 2020 for a reported R1.5bn (£72m) over the next four years to 2024. Another arrangement with South African broadcaster SuperSport was set to be negotiated before April 2021, alongside potential new sponsorship deals and existing television rights.

In September 2020, the financial services giant Momentum confirmed that it would not seek to renew its sponsorship agreement with CSA, affecting the ODIs, the franchise one-day cup, the national club champions, the under-13, under-15 and under-17 competitions and initiatives. Momentum will however continue to sponsor the national women's team under 2023, but stated they will continue to advise CSA to resolve its administrative plight as a matter of urgency.

Momentum is not the only major sponsor to separate from CSA since the start of its instability crisis in December 2019. Standard Bank opted not to continue their support for the national Test team, as well as the CSA development programmes.

The sunflower oil producer Sunfoil, who had sponsored the first-class four-day competition, similarly decided not to renew their sponsorship in 2019.

In October 2026, Cricket South Africa signed their first headline sponsor since 2020, Jonsson Workwear.

== See also ==
- South Africa national cricket team
- Cricket in South Africa
