= Jagmohan Dalmiya =

Indian cricket administrator

26th President of Board of Control for Cricket in India
- In office 2 March 2015 – 20 September 2015
- Preceded by: Shivlal Yadav
- Succeeded by: Shashank Manohar
- In office 2013 – 2013
- Preceded by: N. Srinivasan
- Succeeded by: Shivlal Yadav
- In office 2001 – 2004
- Preceded by: A. C. Muthiah
- Succeeded by: Ranbir Singh Mahendra

14th President of the Cricket Association of Bengal
- In office 1992 – 27 December 2006
- Preceded by: B. N. Dutt
- Succeeded by: Prasun Mukherjee
- In office 29 July 2008 – 20 September 2015
- Preceded by: Prasun Mukherjee
- Succeeded by: Sourav Ganguly

3rd President of International Cricket Council
- In office 1997 – 2000
- Preceded by: Clyde Walcott
- Succeeded by: Malcolm Gray

Personal details
- Born: 30 May 1940 Calcutta, Bengal Presidency, British India (present day Kolkata, West Bengal, India)
- Died: 20 September 2015 (aged 75) Kolkata, West Bengal, India
- Spouse: Chandralekha Dalmiya
- Children: 2
- Occupation: Co-owner of M. L. Dalmiya & Co.

Jagmohan Dalmiya (30 May 1940 – 20 September 2015) was an Indian cricket administrator and businessman from the city of Kolkata. He was the President of the Board of Control for Cricket in India as well as the Cricket Association of Bengal. He had also served as the President of the International Cricket Council.

== Early and personal life ==
Dalmiya was born into a Marwari family of the Baniya (tradesman) caste, originally hailing from Chirawa, Jhunjhunu district in Rajasthan and based in Kolkata for many decades. His father, Arjun Prasad Dalmiya, was a businessman based in Kolkata. Dalmiya studied at the Scottish Church College, Calcutta. He started his career as a wicketkeeper and also opened the batting, playing for one of the leading cricket clubs in Calcutta. After his father's death, Dalmiya took charge of his father's firm ML Dalmiya and Co at the age of 19. The firm constructed Calcutta's Birla Planetarium in 1963.

Dalmiya was married to Chandralekha Dalmiya (née Ghose), who was born into a land-owning Bengali family of Pathuriaghata belonging to the Kayastha caste. They have a son and a daughter. His son, Avishek, took over from his father both in business and at the BCCI. Dalmiya's daughter, Baishali (born 1969), shortly after her father's death, joined the Trinamool Congress in 2016, and was immediately given the ticket to contest the assembly election from the Bally constituency. Subsequently, she was elected to the state assembly.

== Career ==
Dalmiya joined the Board of Control for Cricket in India (BCCI) in 1979 as a representative of Cricket Association of Bengal, and became its treasurer in 1983. Along with civil servant Inderjit Singh Bindra and cricket administrator N. K. P. Salve, Dalmiya proposed the hosting of 1987 World Cup in the Indian subcontinent. The proposal was opposed by the English Test and County Cricket Board, which had hosted all three previous World Cups. However, in 1984, with support votes from associate nations, the proposal passed through International Cricket Council (ICC) with a huge majority. The 1987 Cricket World Cup was the first time the tournament was held outside England, and paved way for rotation system for hosting the tournament. Dalmiya ensured the final was played at the Eden Gardens in Kolkata, renovating its clubhouse in time.

Dalmiya proposed the re-admission of South Africa to international cricket in 1991 and organised South Africa's three-match ODI tour of India the same year. Dalmiya's role is said to have been important, as the then ICC President Clyde Walcott was not in favor of discussing South Africa's re-admission to cricket. In November 1991, South Africa played their first international match since their suspension from international cricket in 1970, an ODI at the Eden Gardens in front of over 100,000 spectators. This match also marked South Africa's return to international sports ending their sporting boycott.

In 1993, Dalmiya along with Bindra won a legal battle against broadcaster Doordarshan to sell the television rights of cricket matches in India. Doordarshan was ruled to require to pay the BCCI for the rights to televise Indian matches. In 1995, the rights were ruled by the Supreme Court of India as a commodity owned by the BCCI and could be sold to the highest bidder. The ruling allowed the BCCI generate more revenue and strengthened its position in the global marketplace.

Dalmiya and the then BCCI President Madhavrao Scindia, secured the Indian subcontinent the hosting rights for the 1996 World Cup, turning the tables on the favorites England. The victory was described in The Times as, "Asian tiger twists Lord's by the tail." However, Australia and West Indies refused to play in terror-scarred Sri Lanka during the tournament. Dalmiya, who was then the Secretary of BCCI, created a united India-Pakistan team (called the Wills XI) in a matter of days to play a goodwill match against Sri Lanka in Sri Lanka. With a record-breaking deal for TV rights being signed for the World Cup, the tournament went on to become a major commercial success.

In 1996, Dalmiya received 23 votes to 13 for Australia's Malcolm Gray in an election for chairman's post of the ICC, but failed to attain the two-thirds majority necessary under the ICC Constitution. However, in 1997 he was unanimously elected President of the ICC (as the position had been renamed), the office of which he held for three years. He thus became the first Asian and the first non-cricketer at the helm of ICC. During his tenure as president, Dalmiya's support was instrumental in awarding Test status to Bangladesh. Bangladesh went on to play their first Test match in November 2000, against India at the Dhaka Stadium. He had also supported Bangladesh in winning the hosting rights of the first-ever ICC Knockout Trophy in 1998. He brought about a major overhaul in the ICC and is credited with helping ICC generate more revenue. The profits made from World Cup were directed to the ICC instead of the host nations, strengthening ICC's power over the World Cup. Since the 1999 edition of the tournament, the World Cup has been officially called "ICC World Cup". When Dalmiya took over as ICC President in 1997, ICC had funds of £16,000 and when his term ended in 2000, it had over $15 million.

After his stint as ICC President, Dalmiya was elected the President of BCCI for the first time in 2001. Later the same year, he was involved in a major row with the ICC over what was called the 'Denness Affair' in which the ICC match referee and former England captain Mike Denness found Sachin Tendulkar guilty of a technical breach of the rules (misreported in the Indian media as an allegation of ball-tampering) and gave him a fine and suspended sentence, while also banning Virender Sehwag for one match for claiming a catch off a bump ball. There was a major argument about the issue and questions were asked in the Indian Parliament. Dalmiya demanded a right of appeal from the ICC, which was refused, and also demanding that Denness be replaced as match referee for the following test or it would be cancelled. Ultimately, as Denness was not permitted to referee the final match of the series by the BCCI and the UCBSA, the match was stripped of Test status by the ICC. Contracts to Indian team players, and pensions to former cricketers and umpires were first awarded in 2003 when Dalmiya was the Board's president.

In the 2005 BCCI board elections, Dalmiya's candidate Ranbir Singh Mahendra was ousted by Indian government minister Sharad Pawar as the head cricket official of India. Later the following year, Dalmiya was expelled from the board for alleged misappropriation of funds and refusing to provide certain documents. However, in May 2007, when he challenged the decision in the Bombay High Court and then the Supreme Court, he was exonerated as the BCCI was unable to prove their charge of financial irregularities against him.

In July 2010, the Calcutta High Court dismissed charges against Dalmiya, and allowed him to contest the presidency of the Cricket Association of Bengal, which he subsequently won.

In June 2013, Dalmiya was appointed as the interim president of the BCCI after N. Srinivasan stepped aside till the probe on Srinivasan's son-in-law's alleged involvement in spot-fixing in the 2013 Indian Premier League was completed. Srinivasan resumed the presidency in October 2013. On 2 March 2015, Dalmiya returned as BCCI President after a 10-year gap replacing Srinivasan.

== Awards and recognition ==
In 1996, the BBC described Dalmiya as one of the world's top six sports executives. In 2005, he was awarded the International Journal of the History of Sports Achievement award for administrative excellence in global sport.

Dalmiya was often cited in the media as the man responsible for commercializing cricket and making BCCI the richest board in the world. He was also credited with breaking Australia and England's "monopoly" of ICC and establishing the presence of Indian subcontinent in international cricket. He was nicknamed in the media the "Machiavelli of Indian cricket", the "master of realpolitik", the "king of comebacks".

Australian cricketer and commentator Ian Chappell has said of Dalmiya: "He has a vision for the game’s progress that I haven’t heard enunciated by any other so-called leader among cricket officials."

== Death ==
Dalmiya began his second term as BCCI president in March 2015. But he was ailing since then, and his health deteriorated further in September. On 17 September 2015, he suffered a massive heart attack and was admitted to the B.M. Birla Hospital in Kolkata. He remained at the Intensive Care Unit and a five-member medical board was set up for his treatment. He died on 20 September 2015 after he had also undergone a coronary angiography. The cause of death was reported to be gastrointestinal bleeding and organ failure.

After his death, Dalmiya's eyes were donated to Vanmukta Eye Bank in the city. On 21 September 2015, Dalmiya's body was taken from his house in Alipore to the Cricket Association of Bengal office at the Eden Gardens. Several dignitaries arrived in Kolkata, including former India skipper Sourav Ganguly, to pay their last respects to him.

Among those who sent condolences for Dalmiya's death were President of India Pranab Mukherjee, Prime Minister Narendra Modi, Chief Minister of West Bengal Mamata Banerjee, current and former cricketers, ICC and various national cricket boards.

Preceded by Clyde Walcott	President of the ICC; 1997–2000	Succeeded by Malcolm Gray
