= Greg King (cricketer) =

South African cricketer (born 1973)

Personal information
- Full name: Gregory Allen King
- Born: 7 August 1973 (age 53); Transvaal, Johannesburg, South Africa
- Batting: Right-handed

Domestic team information
- Years: Team
- 1995/96: Border

Career statistics
Competition	First-class
Matches	3
Runs scored	61
Batting average	15.25
100s/50s	0/0
Top score	37*
Catches/stumpings	0/0
- Source: CricInfo, 3 February 2023

Gregory Allen King (born 7 August 1973) is a South African former first-class cricketer who later became the fitness coach for India and South Africa national cricket teams. He was the fitness trainer to Chennai Super Kings from 2008 to 2015 and in 2018.

He played three first-class games for Border B in the 1995–96 season.

King took a post-graduate degree in Human Kinetics and Ergonomics from King Edward VII, St John's College, Rhodes University.
