= Ehsan Mani =

Pakistani chartered accountant

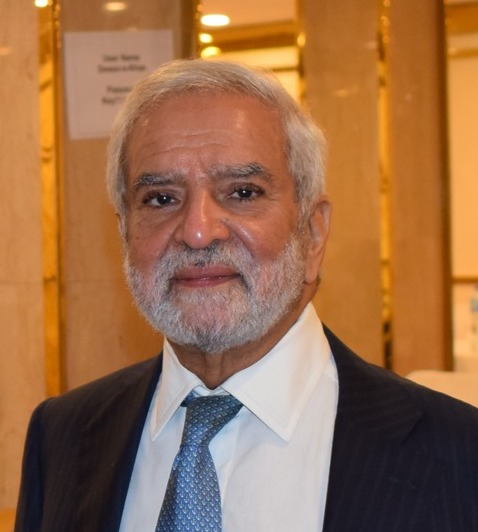

34th Chairman of the Pakistan Cricket Board
- In office 4 September 2018 – 26 August 2021
- President: Arif Alvi
- Prime Minister: Imran Khan
- Preceded by: Najam Sethi
- Succeeded by: Ramiz Raja

President of the International Cricket Council
- In office 2003–2006
- Preceded by: Malcolm Gray
- Succeeded by: Percy Sonn

Personal details
- Born: 23 March 1945 (age 81) Rawalpindi, Punjab, British India
- Relatives: Dilawar Mani (Brother)
- Education: Chartered Accountant
- Alma mater: Government College University

Ehsan Mani (Urdu: احسان مانی; born 23 March 1945) is a Pakistani chartered accountant who is the former president of International Cricket Council (ICC) and former chairman of Pakistan Cricket Board (PCB).

== Early life ==
Mani was born in Rawalpindi Pakistan into a Pashtun family. His early life was spent in Pakistan playing for the Rawalpindi Club and Government College Lahore XI from 1959 to 1965 as a right-hand batsman and a left-arm fast medium bowler before moving to the United Kingdom to complete his further studies. He is member of ICAEW (Institute of Chartered Accountants in England and Wales) and is a Chartered Accountant by profession. He has resided in the UK since late 1960s.

== Cricket administrator ==
From 1989 to 1996, Mani represented the Pakistan Cricket Board (PCB) in the ICC. For the 1996 Cricket World Cup, he was on the advisory committee as the PCB representative. He was also on the same committee during the 1999 Cricket World Cup played in England. In 1996, he was elected by the ICC member nations to the position of chairman of the ICC finance and marketing committee. He held this position until this committee was dissolved in June 2002. After that he took over as the vice-president of the ICC executive board. He has also served on a number of ICC committees, such as the Chairman's Advisory Committee, set up to advise Lord Cowdrey and Sir Clyde Walcott during their stint as ICC president. Other committees he has been a part of are the rules review committee and the governance and organisation committee. In June 2003, he became the ICC president.

Mani is on the board of a number of UK companies mostly banking and real-estate. He is also the chairman of Galiyat Development Authority (KP), member of board of governors of Shaukat Khanum Memorial Trust and member of board of directors of Biafo Industries Ltd in Pakistan. He is also trustee of a number of charities in UK and Pakistan.

On 20 August 2018, Prime Minister Imran Khan nominated Ehsan Mani as PCB Chairman. On 4 September 2018, he was elected unopposed as PCB Chairman by the PCB's Board of Governors for a period of three years.
