= Ray Mali =

South African cricket administrator

President of the ICC
- In office 2007–2008
- Preceded by: Percy Sonn
- Succeeded by: David Morgan

Personal details
- Born: April 9, 1937 (age 88) Cape Province, Union of South Africa

Raymond Remember Mali (born April 9, 1937), better known as Ray Mali, was appointed acting President of the International Cricket Council in 2007, following the unexpected death in office of Percy Sonn. He was born in the Cape Province (now Eastern Cape), Union of South Africa. He had been the President of Cricket South Africa since 2003 (the first black person to hold the position) and remained as ICC president till 2008.

He once was a minister in the bantustan of Ciskei.

Preceded by Percy Sonn	President of the ICC; 2007-2008	Succeeded by David Morgan
