= David Morgan (cricket administrator) =

Welsh cricket administrator (born 1937)

President of International Cricket Council
- In office 2008–2010
- Preceded by: Ray Mali
- Succeeded by: Sharad Pawar

Frederick David Morgan OBE DL (born 6 October 1937), is a British cricket administrator, who served as President of the International Cricket Council from 2008 to 2010.

Chairman of the England and Wales Cricket Board (2002–07), Morgan was previously Chairman of Glamorgan County Cricket Club (1993–97), later President (2012–14).

== Biography ==
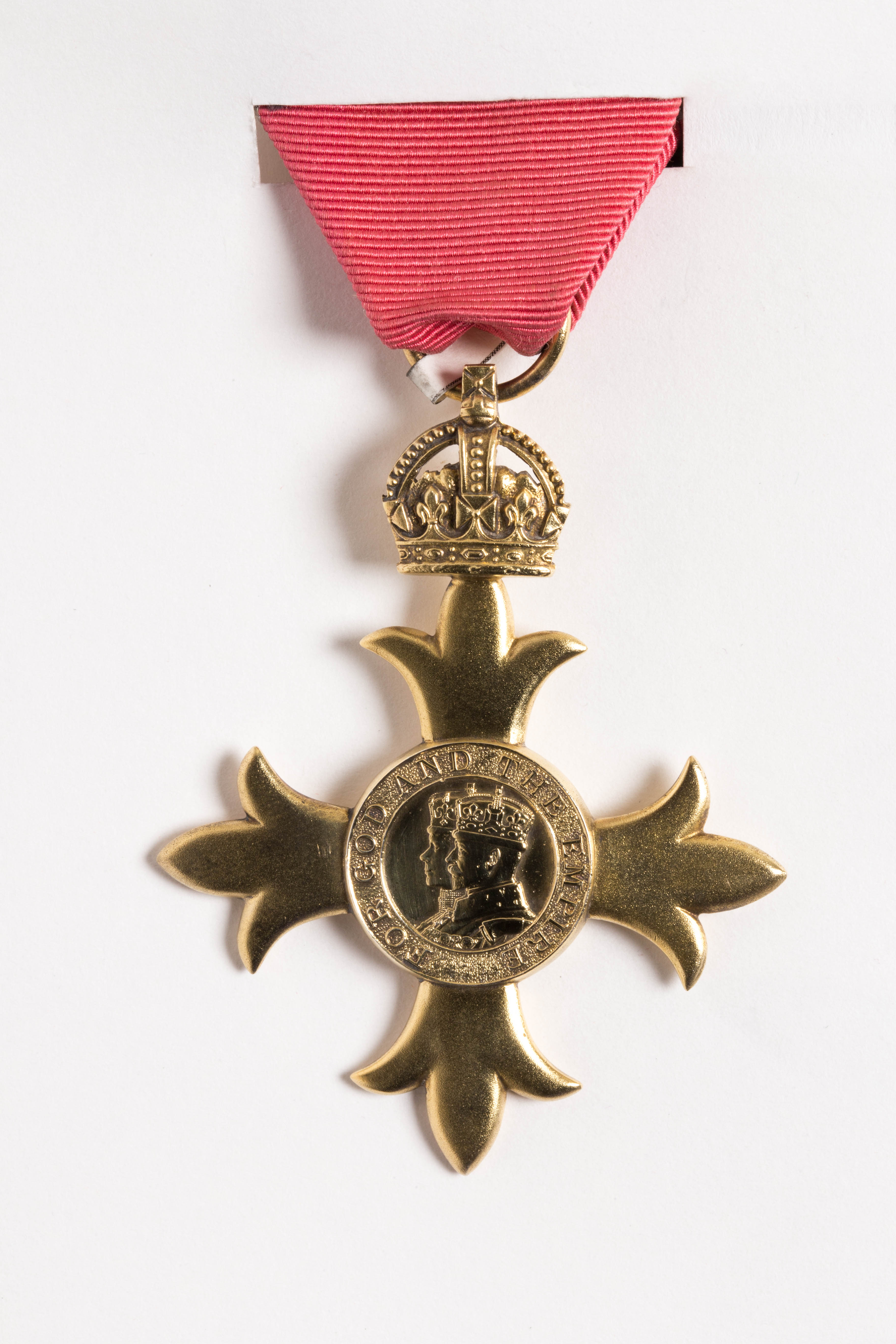
OBE insignia

Born at Tredegar in Gwent, in 1993 Morgan succeeded Tony Lewis as Chairman of Glamorgan CCC, a position he held until 1997 when he joined the ECB board as Deputy Chairman under Ian, Baron MacLaurin of Knebworth. When Lord MacLaurin stepped down from the ECB in 2002, Morgan stood for election and became Chairman in October 2002 upon winning eleven votes to the eight of his opposing candidate, Mike Soper. In 2004 and 2006 Morgan was re-elected as ECB Chairman unopposed.

Nominated for the presidency of the ICC in 2007, Morgan and Sharad Pawar received an equal number of votes, so by agreement they shared the role as co-president: Morgan began his term in June 2008 and served for two years before being succeeded by Pawar in 2010.

Appointed OBE for "services to cricket" in 2008, Morgan served as President of Marylebone Cricket Club for 2014/15.

In the business world Morgan was commercial director of European Electrical Steels until 2001.

== See also ==
- England and Wales Cricket Board

Preceded by Ray Mali	President of the ICC; 2008–2010	Succeeded by Sharad Pawar
