= Gurunath Meiyappan =

Indian businessman

- Education: B.Com
- Alma mater: Loyola College
- Spouse: Rupa Gurunath
- Parent(s): AVM Balasubramanian, Lalitha Balasubramanian
- Relatives: A. V. Meiyappan (grandfather)

Gurunath Meiyappan is a member of the AVM family and is the son-in-law of industrialist, former president of the BCCI, and former chairman of the ICC, N. Srinivasan. He was the "team principal" of the IPL cricket franchise, Chennai Super Kings and was implicated in the 2013 Indian Premier League spot-fixing and betting case. An inquiry committee headed by former Chief Justice RM Lodha found both Meiyappan and Rajasthan Royals co-owner, Raj Kundra, guilty of bringing the game of cricket into disrepute and banned them for life.

== 2013 Indian Premier League spot-fixing and betting case ==
In 2013 Meiyappan was suspended from all cricket activities for life by the Supreme Court appointed Lodha Committee for bringing the game of cricket into disrepute through his involvement in illegal betting of IPL matches. He was found guilty under the BCCI anti-corruption code 2.2.1 and suspended for life from being involved in any kind of cricket matches under section 6, rule 4.2 of anti-corruption code. The Chennai Super Kings franchise was suspended for two-years from the Indian Premier League.
