= Malcolm Gray =

Malcom Gray

4th President of International Cricket Council
- In office 2000–2003
- Preceded by: Jagmohan Dalmiya
- Succeeded by: Ehsan Mani

Malcolm Alexander Gray (born 30 May 1940) is an Australia cricket administrator. He served as Chairman of the Australian Cricket Board from 1986 to 1989 and President of the International Cricket Council between 2000 and 2003. He was the first and to date only Australian to serve in the post.

Preceded by Jagmohan Dalmiya	President of the ICC; 2000-2003	Succeeded by Ehsan Mani
