= N. Srinivasan =

Indian industrialist and cricket administrator

1st Chairman of the International Cricket Council
- In office 26 June 2014 – 22 November 2015
- Preceded by: Position Established
- Succeeded by: Shashank Manohar

30th President of the Board of Control for Cricket in India
- In office 19 September 2011 – 2013
- Preceded by: Shashank Manohar
- Succeeded by: Jagmohan Dalmiya

Secretary of BCCI
- In office 25 September 2008 – 19 September 2011
- President: Shashank Manohar
- Preceded by: Niranjan S. Shah
- Succeeded by: Sanjay Jagdale

President of Tamil Nadu Cricket Association
- In office 2002–2017
- Preceded by: A. C. Muthiah
- Succeeded by: Rupa Gurunath

Personal details
- Born: Narayanaswami Srinivasan; 3 January 1945 (age 81) Kallidaikurichi, Madras Presidency, British India
- Spouse: Chitra
- Children: Ashwin; Rupa
- Parent: T. S. Narayanaswami
- Education: BSc (Tech), MSc.IT
- Alma mater: Loyola College, Chennai; Illinois Institute of Technology
- Occupation: MD of Indian Cements Limited

Narayanaswami Srinivasan (born 3 January 1945) is an Indian industrialist and former cricket administrator. He was the Chairman of the International Cricket Council (ICC) and the President of the BCCI, the governing body for cricket in India. He was also the promoter and managing director of India Cements, and is the owner of Indian Premier League (IPL) team Chennai Super Kings.

Srinivasan was investigated regarding several scams, including betting on IPL cricket matches; his son-in-law Gurunath Meiyappan has been indicted for passing IPL information to bookies. He was also investigated for corruption involving politician Jagan Mohan Reddy. In March 2014, the Supreme Court of India ordered him to quit as BCCI president to facilitate investigations into the IPL betting scam.

On 26 June 2016, he was re-elected president of Tamil Nadu Cricket Association, during their 86th annual general meeting in Chennai. He was elected unopposed.

== Early life and education ==
Srinivasan was born at Kallidaikurichi, Tirunelveli district, Tamil Nadu. He is the son of T. S. Narayanaswami, one of the first employees of India Cements. He did his schooling in Madras Christian College Higher Secondary School. He holds a Bachelor of Science from Loyola College, Chennai and Master of Science degree in chemical engineering from the Illinois Institute of Technology, Chicago, United States.

== Sports administration ==
Srinivasan was introduced to cricket administration by former BCCI president A. C. Muthiah. He was the Secretary of the BCCI before becoming the president, taking over the reins from Shashank Manohar, in 2011. He was succeeded by Jagmohan Dalmiya in 2014. His company India Cements owns Indian Premier League (IPL) franchise team Chennai Super Kings and he is the president of the Tamil Nadu Cricket Association (TNCA).

Srinivasan is also the president of the Tamil Nadu Golf Federation and former president of the All India Chess Federation. He was elected as president of the Tamil Nadu Cricket Association(TNCA) for the 14th consecutive time at its 85th Annual General Meeting in Chennai, on 12 June 2015. He is heading the TNCA since 2002–03, when he ended the reign of former BCCI president A.C. Muthiah. Srinivasan became the first chairman of the ICC On 26 June 2014. On 9 November 2015, he was removed as ICC chairman.

== Corporate career ==
Srinivasan took over as vice-chairman and managing director of India Cements in 1989. He made a hostile attempt to take over Andhra Pradesh based Raasi Cements in 90's and merged it with India Cements. The Rs 380-crore deal was one of the biggest ever acquisitions in Indian corporate history, and the first successful hostile takeover. By spending about 500 crores in total, he was able to get a greenfield plant that would have cost him about 1000 crores. Later, he made a bid for Yerraguntla plant of government-owned Cement Corporation of India (CCI) and annexed it to India Cements. He managed to beat Gujarat Ambuja (now Ambuja Cements), the other bidder, at the post because of the tacit support he got from the ministers in the central government at that time.

He served as the president of the Madras Chamber of Commerce and Industry from 1996 to 1998 and is a member of the executive committee of Federation of Indian Chambers of Commerce and Industry (FICCI). Between 1991 and 2006, he was the president of the Cement Manufacturers' Association for five terms and chairman of the board of Governors of the National Council for Cement and Building Materials (NCCBM) for four terms between 1991 and 2006. He was also the chairman of Development Council for Cement Industry (DCCI) constituted by the Government of India for two terms from 1992 to 1996. He was also the president of The Madras Chamber of Commerce and Industry (MCCI) for two terms between 1996 and 1998. In 2000–2001, he was president of the All India Organisation of Employers. He was also a member of the Prime Minister's Council of Trade and Industry (1996–2001). He was the Sheriff of Madras for two terms during the period 1989 to 1991.

== Controversies ==
=== Changing regulations for personal benefits ===
The BCCI had a regulation Clause 6.2.4 stated that "no administrator of BCCI could have had, directly or indirectly, any commercial interest in the matches or events conducted by the cricket board". Later, after the start of IPL in 2008, the clause was amended to give unfavorable benefit to BCCI members such that they can own stakes in the IPL, the ICC Champions Trophy and other T20 matches. N. Srinivasan became the owner of Chennai Super Kings (CSK) after this rule was changed. This clause was later brought by the Supreme Court of India.

=== Betting and abuse of power ===
In 2013, under the massive Indian Premier League Spot fixing controversy, N. Srinivasan's son-in-law and CSK team principal Gurunath Meiyappan was arrested by Mumbai Police under the involvement in heavy betting and trading of inside information to bookies. Despite media and national outrage asking for his resignation, he remained defiant. But ultimately, he stepped aside on 2 June 2013 and appointed Jagmohan Dalmiya as the interim president. On 27 September, Supreme Court restrained him from holding the post of BCCI President until its further orders. On 8 October 2013 Supreme Court allowed N. Srinivasan to take charge as BCCI president.

As the president of BCCI he had controversial conflicting relations with Mahendra Singh Dhoni, who was then captain of both the Indian Men's Cricket Team and his IPL Franchise CSK. Srinivasan had and still has lots of conflicts of interests. He was at one point in time, the president of BCCI, the owner of CSK, a team in IPL, and also the owner of India cements, a firm in which he had appointed Dhoni as a vice-president. He also used his personal influence and power to halt Dhoni's being removed from captaincy, by interfering in what is supposed to be an independent decision of the national selectors.

On 10 February 2014, a report submitted by the retired High Court Chief Justice Mukul Mudgal-led committee, accused Srinivasan's son-in-law, Gurunath Meiyappan of illegal betting and passing on sensitive match-related information to bookies during IPL 2013. The 170-page report also stated that his company, India Cements was liable for Meiyappan's actions and that the Chennai Super Kings franchise was in violation of the franchise agreement, which may result in the termination of the Indian Premier League franchise. On 21 March, Meiyappan's voice was found to match a tapped phone conversation discussing match fixing activities

On 25 March 2014 the Supreme Court of India ordered Srinivasan to step down as BCCI president so that a fair investigation may be conducted. The court found it "nauseating" that he should hold on to the post despite various courts censuring him.

On 27 November 2014 the Supreme Court said that his's conflict of interest was "obvious" as he also owned a team in the IPL, CSK. The court also asked BCCI if it was open to have a fresh poll for a new board without Srinivasan. On 29 March 2015, he gave away the Cricket World Cup trophy to the winning Australian team - an act that should have been performed by then ICC President Mustafa Kamal. Prior to the final, Kamal had made controversial statements regarding umpiring in the India-Bangladesh quarterfinals. In light of these comments, ICC reportedly had a meeting, and decided that Kamal would not be allowed to hand over the trophy. Srinivasan had also expressed his extreme unhappiness over Kamal's comments in the same meeting, causing an embarrassed Kamal to walk out of the final before the match even finished. He later quit his position as the president, and vowed to expose the people behind the "mischievousness".

=== Corruption allegations with Y. S. Jagan Mohan Reddy ===
Srinivasan was one of the main investors in several of Jagan Mohan Reddy's "suitcase companies" and is a subject of investigation in the Rs. 3000 crore corruption case. India Cements had invested more than a hundred crores in Jagan's Bharti Cement in return for quid pro quo favours granted while Jagan's father Y.S. Rajasekhara Reddy was the chief minister of Andhra Pradesh between 2004 and 2009. The Central Bureau of Investigation (CBI) was of the opinion that Srinivasan's company, India Cements invested Rs. 140 crore into Jagan's business in return for the benefits it received from the Rajasekhara Reddy government. He has appeared in front of the special CBI court repeatedly to answer for this allegedly massive corruption case.

== Personal life ==
Srinivasan is married to Chitra Srinivasan and the couple have two children: Rupa Gurunath Meiyappan and Ashwin Srinivasan. Srinivasan's younger brother, N. Ramachandran, is also involved in sports administration as the head of the Tamil Nadu Squash Rackets Association, president of the Indian Olympic Association and the chief of World Squash Federation.

His daughter Rupa is married to film producer Gurunath Meiyappan, who was one of the most high profile arrests in the 2013 IPL spot-fixing case. Rupa was also the president of Tamil Nadu cricket association.
