= Madhavi Mudgal =

Indian classical dancer (born 1951)

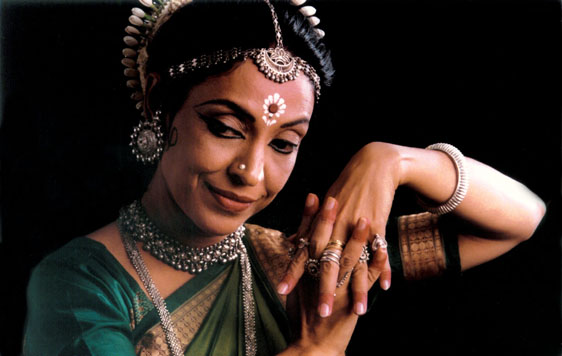
- Born: 4 October 1951 (age 74); Orissa, India
- Occupations: Odissi dance performer and teacher
- Career
- Current group: Gandharva Mahavidyalaya, New Delhi
- Dances: Odissi, Bharatnatyam, Kathak

Madhavi Mudgal is an Indian classical dancer known for her Odissi dance style. She has won several awards, including the Sanskriti Award, 1984, President of India's award of Padma Shri, 1990, the Orissa State Sangeet Natak Akademi Award, 1996, Grande Medaille de la Ville by Govt. of France, 1997, Central Sangeet Natak Akademi Award, 2000, Delhi State Parishad Samman, 2002 and the title of Nritya Choodamani in 2004.

== Early life and training ==
Madhavi Mudgal was born to Professor Vinay Chandra Maudgalya, the founder of Gandharva Mahavidyalaya; one of the most famous institutions for Hindustani music and classical dance in New Delhi. Professor Vinay Chandra Maudgalya is best remembered today for the lyrics of the song Hind Desh ke Niwasi in the animation film Ek Anek Aur Ekta by Vijaya Mulay which won the National Film Award for Best Educational Film. She inherited a love of art and dance from her family and under the guidance of her guru Shri Harekrishna Behera, the world soon learned of her extraordinary skills. She gave her first public performance at the age of only 4. Initially, she learnt Bharatnatyam and Kathak, but finally she chose Odissi as her medium of expression. Her Odissi art skills were refined to finest under the tutelage of Guru Kelucharan Mohapatra.

In a response to an Interview on why she chose Odissi although she was trained initially in various other forms, she said,

The lyricism and subtlety of the form attracted me. As a child, when I was introduced to dance, only Bharatanatyam and Kathak were available as classical styles. Later, in my teens, the language barrier with Bharatanatyam and the showmanship of Kathak made me switch to Odissi which had begun to be taught in Delhi just then. Also, the challenges offered by an as-yet nascent form.

She holds a diploma in Architecture and often writes for various magazines and books.

== Career ==
She is 'globally acclaimed' for her insight into the art of choreography and training new dancers in Odissi.

Madhavi Mudgal tells us how it feels to dance – anticipation, endurance and closure can be read on her face. Seeing her fingers trill like a coloratura negotiating an aria is a thrill.

— DanceviewTimes.com, Washington

The dance festivals featured throughout the world have critical acclaim for her choreographic works, these include the Edinburgh International Festival, U.K.; Festival of India in United States; the Cervantino Festival, Mexico; Vienna Dance Festival, Austria; Festival of Indian Dance, South Africa; Festival of Indian Culture, São Paulo, Brazil; Days of Indian Culture, Hungary; Festival of Indian Arts, London; the Avignon Festival, France; Pina Bausch's Festival, Wuppertal and Berlin Festpiele, Germany; and festivals in Italy, Spain, Laos, Vietnam, Malaysia, Japan and the Indian subcontinent. She played a leader role is establishing Odissi as one of the major classical dance forms of India through audio-visual presentations, concerts as well as with the organisation of widely appreciated specialised dance festivals in India.

She thinks that the most memorable day in her life is the moment when Guru Kelucharan Mohapatra accepted her as his disciple.

== Personal life ==
Her brother Madhup Mudgal a Padma Shri award winner, is known for his khayal and bhajan renditions. He is also a composer, conductor and has been principal of the Gandharva Mahavidyalaya, New Delhi, a music and dance school since 1995. Her niece Arushi (34), daughter of Madhup Mudgal and a former student of Carmel Convent School batch of 2004 in Delhi, trained by Madhavi at Gandharva Mahavidyalaya, made her stage debut as a solo Odissi dancer in 2003. In 2008, she was the only Indian dancer to participate in International Dance Festival 2008 organised by German choreographer Pina Bausch, where she performed a self choreographed piece, Bageshri. Madhavi Mudgal's second brother Mukul Mudgal is a retired Chief Justice of the Punjab and Haryana High Court who headed the Mudgal Committee, comprising Additional Solicitor General of India L Nageswara Rao and senior advocate and former cricket umpire Nilay Dutta, appointed by the Supreme Court to conduct an independent inquiry into the allegation of corruption, betting and spot-fixing in 2013 Indian Premier League. Born on 4 January 1949, Justice Mudgal was appointed as a Judge of the Delhi High Court on 2 March 1998. He was sworn in as Chief Justice of the High Court on 5 December 2009 and retired on 3 January 2011. Her nephew Dhaval, son of Justice Mudgal and noted Hindustani classical vocalist Shubha Mudgal is a lead singer in a famous Delhi-based band Half Step Down and a promising poker player.

== See also ==
- Vinay Chandra Maudgalya
- Madhup Mudgal
- Mukul Mudgal
- Shubha Mudgal
