= Madhup Mudgal =

- Origin: New Delhi, India
- Genres: Khayal, Bhajan
- Occupations: Indian Classical singer, composer, Principal, Gandharva Mahavidyalaya, Delhi
- Instrument: Indian Classical Vocalist

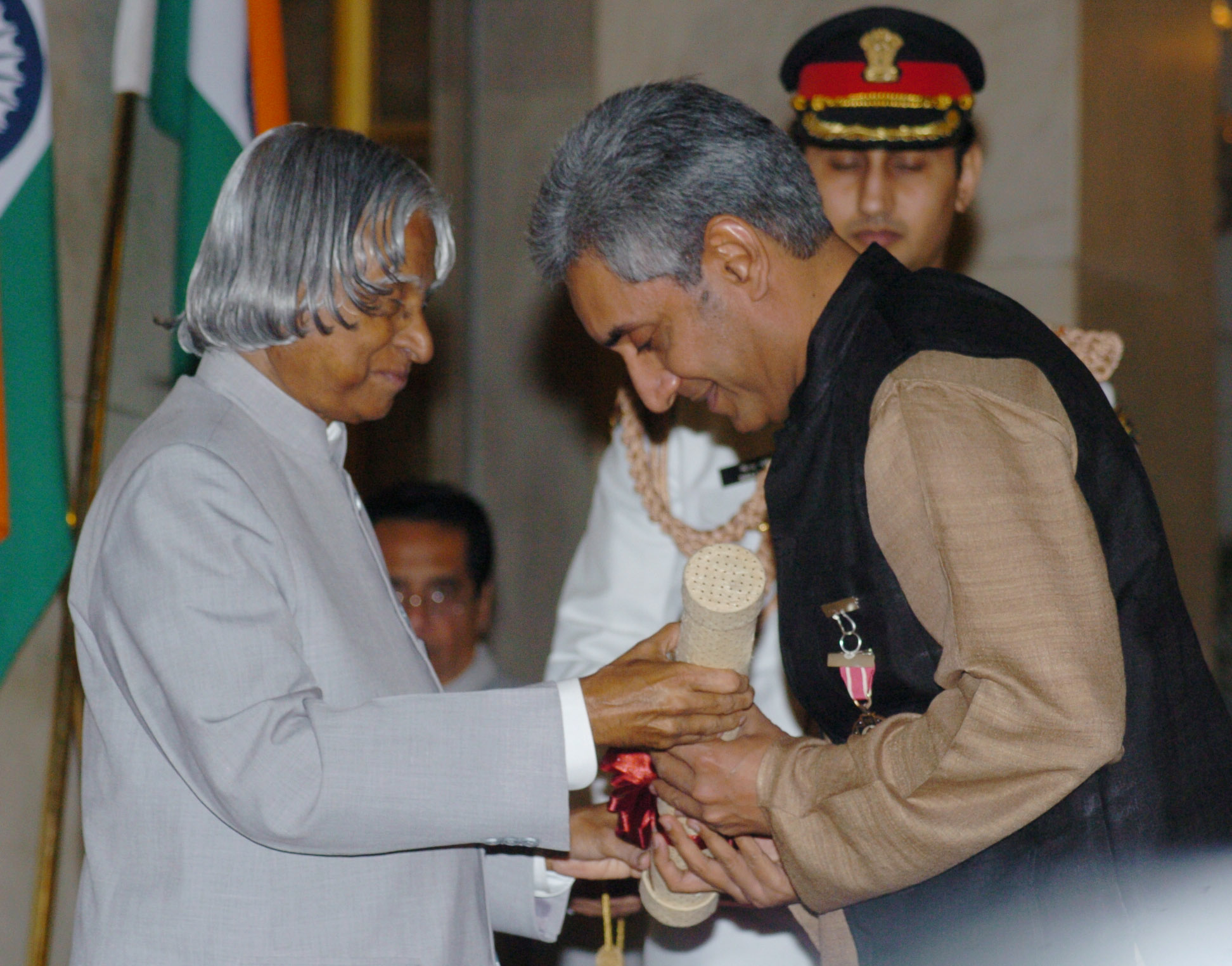
The President, Dr. A.P.J. Abdul Kalam presenting Padma Shri to a Hindustani classical vocalist Shri Madhup Mudgal, at investiture ceremony in New Delhi on March 29, 2006

Madhup Mudgal is an Indian Hindustani classical music vocalist., known for his khayal and bhajan renditions. A disciple of Kumar Gandharva, he is also a composer, conductor of famous Gandharva Choir and has been principal of the Gandharva Mahavidyalaya, Delhi, a music and dance school since 1995.

He received the prestigious Padma Shri award from the Government of India in 2006. He was awarded the Sangeet Natak Akademi Award for 2018.

== Early life and training ==
Madhup Mudgal was born in New Delhi to Professor Vinay Chandra Maudgalya, a renowned classical musician from the Gwalior gharana. His father started Gandharva Mahavidyalaya, New Delhi in 1939 from their home near Plaza cinema, Connaught Place. Professor Vinay Chandra Maudgalya is best remembered today for the lyrics of the song Hind Desh ke Niwasi in the animation film Ek Anek Aur Ekta by Vijaya Mulay which won the National Film Award for Best Educational Film. Because of his father's interests, Madhup grew up in a musical environment, where veteran musicians like Pt. Omkarnath Thakur and Ali Akbar Khan would come by regularly for sangeet baithaks (musical sittings). The school moved to its present location at Deen Dayal Upadhayaya Marg in 1972 and today houses over 1200 dance and music students and a faculty of 60 teachers.

Madhup completed his early schooling at Modern School, New Delhi He holds an M.A. and a MPhil degree from the Music Faculty of University of Delhi for his research in the structure of Khayal. He received his early training in Hindustani classical music from his father, and went on to learn under the tutelage of musicians like Pandit Vasant Thakar, Pandit Jasraj and finally the musical stalwart Kumar Gandharva.

== Career ==
Madhup Mudgal travels across the world for his performances. He has remained the conductor of the Gandharva Choir, a music group for many years. He has been the Principal of Gandharva Mahavidyalaya, Delhi the oldest music school in Delhi, since 1995, where he has trained several musicians under him.

He also composes music for the productions of his sister, Odissi dancer and choreographer, Madhavi Mudgal.

== Personal life ==
His sister is noted Odissi dancer Madhavi Mudgal, who also teaches at Gandharva Mahavidyalaya. His daughter, Arushi, former student of Carmel Convent School in Delhi, and trained by Madhavi at Gandharava Mahavidyalaya, made her stage debut a solo Odissi dancer in 2003. In 2008, she was the only Indian dancer to participate in International Dance Festival 2008 organised by German choreographer Pina Bausch, where she performed a self choreographed piece, Bageshri. His brother Mukul Mudgal is a retired Chief Justice of the Punjab and Haryana High Court who headed the Mudgal Committee, comprising Additional Solicitor General of India L Nageswara Rao and senior advocate and former cricket umpire Nilay Dutta, appointed by the Supreme Court to conduct an independent inquiry into the allegation of corruption, betting and spot-fixing in 2013 Indian Premier League. Born on 4 January 1949, Justice Mudgal was appointed as a Judge of the Delhi High Court on 2 March 1998. He was sworn in as Chief Justice of the High Court on 5 December 2009 and retired on 3 January 2011. His nephew Dhaval, son of Justice Mudgal and noted Hindustani classical vocalist Shubha Mudgal (now divorced and married to Aneesh Pradhan), is a lead singer in a famous Delhi-based band Half Step Down and a promising poker player.

== See also ==
- Vinay Chandra Maudgalya
- Madhavi Mudgal
- Mukul Mudgal
- Shubha Mudgal
