= Mukul Mudgal =

Indian judge

Personal details
- Born: Mukul Mudgal New Delhi, India

Mukul Mudgal is a retired Indian judge of the Delhi High Court, and remained Chief Justice of Punjab and Haryana High Court from 2009 to 2011. He is currently the head of the FIFA Governance Committee and Review Committee.

== Biography ==
Mudgal was born in New Delhi to Professor Vinay Chandra Maudgalya, a renowned classical musician from the Gwalior gharana. His father started Gandharva Mahavidyalaya, New Delhi in 1939 from their home near Plaza Cinema, Connaught Place. Professor Maudgalya is best remembered today for the lyrics of the song Hind Desh ke Niwasi in the animation film Ek Anek Aur Ekta by Vijaya Mulay which won the National Film Award for Best Educational Film. After his schooling from Modern School, Barakhamba Road, New Delhi, Mukul Mudgal did B.Sc. (Hons.) from Hindu College, University of Delhi followed by LL.B. from Faculty of Law, University of Delhi. He started his career as an advocate at the Supreme Court of India and the Delhi High Court in 1973. He worked under Dr. Y.S. Chitale (Sr. Advocate) as a junior for many years and appeared in a number of landmark cases whilst working under him. He was appointed a judge of the Delhi High Court on 2 March 1998. Thereafter, he became the Chief Justice of Punjab and Haryana High Court on 5 December 2009 and retired on 3 January 2011.

In 2014, he headed Mudgal Committee, which included Additional Solicitor General of India L Nageswara Rao and senior advocate and former cricket umpire Nilay Dutta, appointed by the Supreme Court to conduct an independent inquiry into the allegation of corruption, betting and spot-fixing in 2013 Indian Premier League.

His sister, Madhavi Mudgal is noted Indian Odissi classical dancer, while brother Madhup Mudgal, a Hindustani classical vocalist. He was earlier married to his father's disciple and noted Hindustani classical vocalist Shubha Mudgal. His son is a lead singer in a famous Delhi-based band Half Step Down and a poker player.

== See also ==
- Vinay Chandra Maudgalya
- Madhavi Mudgal
- Madhup Mudgal
- Shubha Mudgal
- Mudgal Committee
- L Nageswara Rao
- Nilay Dutta
- 2013 Indian Premier League spot-fixing and betting case
