= Vinay Chandra Maudgalya =

Indian classical musician (1918–1995)

- Born: 2 April 1918; New Delhi, India
- Died: 1995 (aged 76–77)
- Occupations: Classical musician Vocalist
- Known for: Indian classical music
- Spouse: Padma Devi
- Children: Madhup Mudgal; Mukul Mudgal; Madhavi Mudgal
- Awards: Padma Shri

Vinay Chandra Maudgalya (2 April 1918 – 1995) was an Indian classical musician, vocalist and the founder of Gandharva Mahavidyalaya, a music and dance academy for the promotion of Hindustani music and Indian classical dances. He was a follower of Gwalior gharana. The Government of India awarded him the fourth highest Indian civilian honour of Padma Shri in 1984.

== Biography ==
Vinay Chandra Maudgalya was born on 2 April 1918. He received his early training in Hindustani classical music at Vishnu Digambar Paluskar's academy in Lahore. Later, he trained under Vinayakrao Patwardhan in Pune. He arrived in Delhi in 1939, as a "lanky, strikingly handsome" 21-year old, with a mandate to set up a school for classical music in Delhi.

Gandharva Mahavidyalaya was established in 1939. It was initially located in a rented flat near the now-closed Regal cinema in Connaught Place. In the early years, there were few students, and Maudgalya would go around on his bicycle trying to persuade families to send their children to his academy.

Maudgalya was awarded the civilian honour of Padma Shri by the Government of India in 1984. He was married to Padma Devi and the couple had two sons, Madhup Mudgal, a renowned musician and the incumbent principal of Gandharva Mahavidyalaya, Mukul Mudgal, the retired Chief Justice of the Punjab and Haryana High Court who headed the Mudgal Committee, comprising Additional Solicitor General of India L Nageswara Rao and senior advocate and former cricket umpire Nilay Dutta, appointed by the Supreme Court to conduct an independent inquiry into the allegation of corruption, betting and spot-fixing in 2013 Indian Premier League and a daughter, Madhavi Mudgal, an Odissi exponent. Both Mudhup and Madhavi are also recipients of Padma Shri. Mudgalya's music pursuit is one of the main features of the 2002 documentary film, Pratidhwani - Echoes, made by Basheer Ali which focuses on other renowned musicians such as Mohan Nadkarni, Naushad, Vasant Paluskar and Ravi Shankar as well.

Maudgalya died in 1995.

== See also ==
- Gandharva Mahavidyalaya
- Madhup Mudgal
- Madhavi Mudgal
- Vishnu Digambar Paluskar
- Vinayakrao Patwardhan
- Mudgal
- Gwalior gharana
