= Shubha Mudgal =

Indian singer (born 1959)

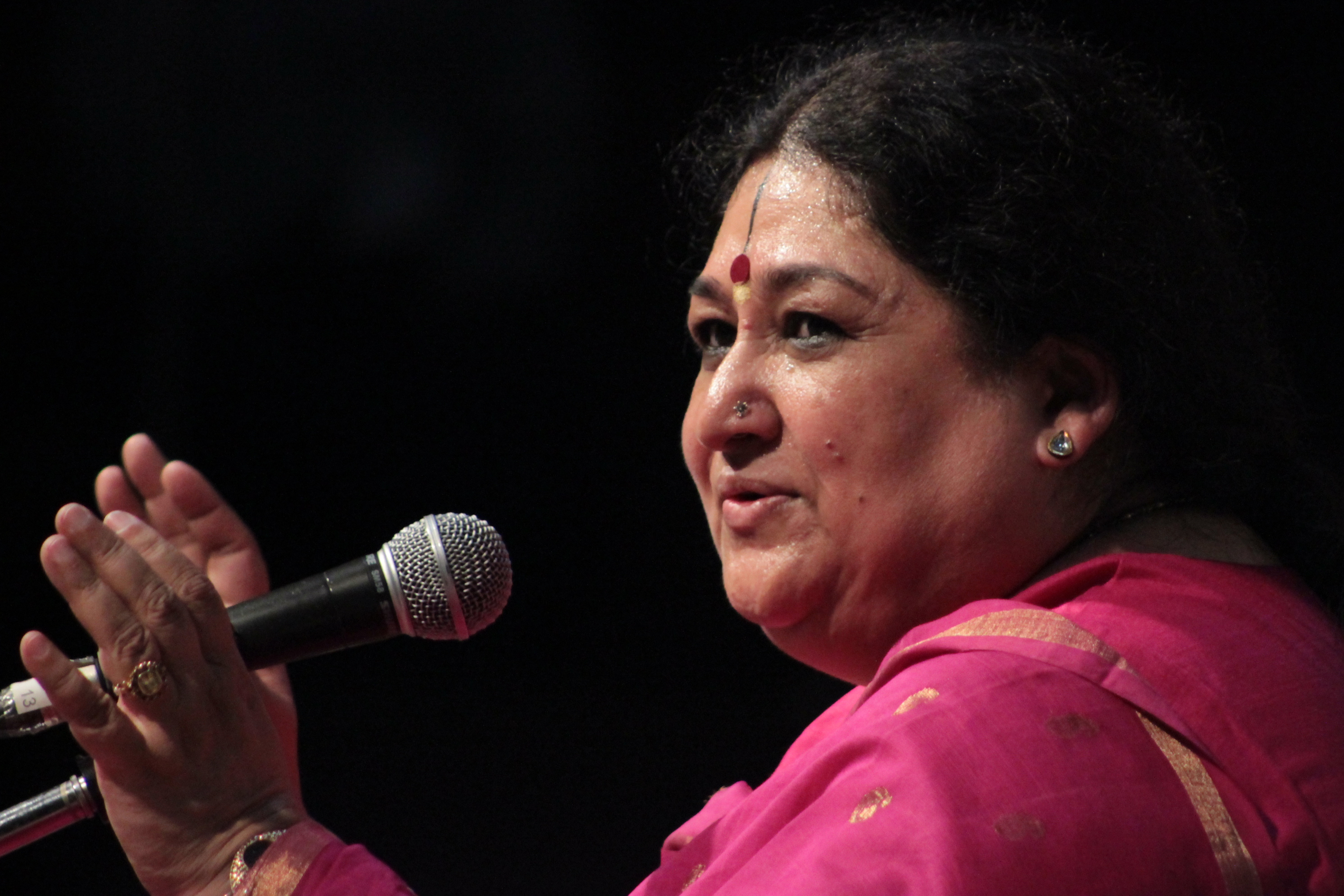
- Shubha Mudgal Performing at Bharat Bhavan in Bhopal in 2015

Background information
- Born: Shubha Gupta; 23 June 1959 (age 67); Prayagraj, Uttar Pradesh, India
- Genres: Hindustani Classical Music, Pop, folk, playback singing
- Occupation: Singer
- Years active: 1986–2025
- Website: www.shubhamudgal.com

Shubha Mudgal (born June 23, 1959) is an Indian singer, and composer, known for her work in Hindustani classical music, Indian pop, and Tamil cinema. Her repertoire includes the genres of khayal, thumri, and dadra. She was awarded the Padma Shri in 2000.

== Early life ==
Shubha was born on June 23, 1959 in Prayagraj into an academic family. Her parents, Skand Gupta and Jaya Gupta, were both professors of English literature at Allahabad University, and both of them had a deep interest in Hindustani classical music and the arts. Shubha's paternal grandfather, P. C. Gupta, was also a professor at Allahabad University.

== Education and musical training ==
Shubha grew up in Prayagraj and after finishing school, attended St. Mary's Convent Inter College. As children, music and dance lessons were organized for her and her sister by their parents. As a child, she once replied to a dance examiner's routine query of "Aap kis gharaane ka Kathak naachti hain? (what is the style/school of Kathak to which you belong?)" with the retort, "Hum apne gharaane ki Kathak naachte hain (I dance my own style of Kathak)". She later switched to Hindustani classical music as her vocation of choice while maintaining the same individualistic attitude. Her first traditional teacher (guru) was Pt. Ramashreya Jha in Prayagraj.

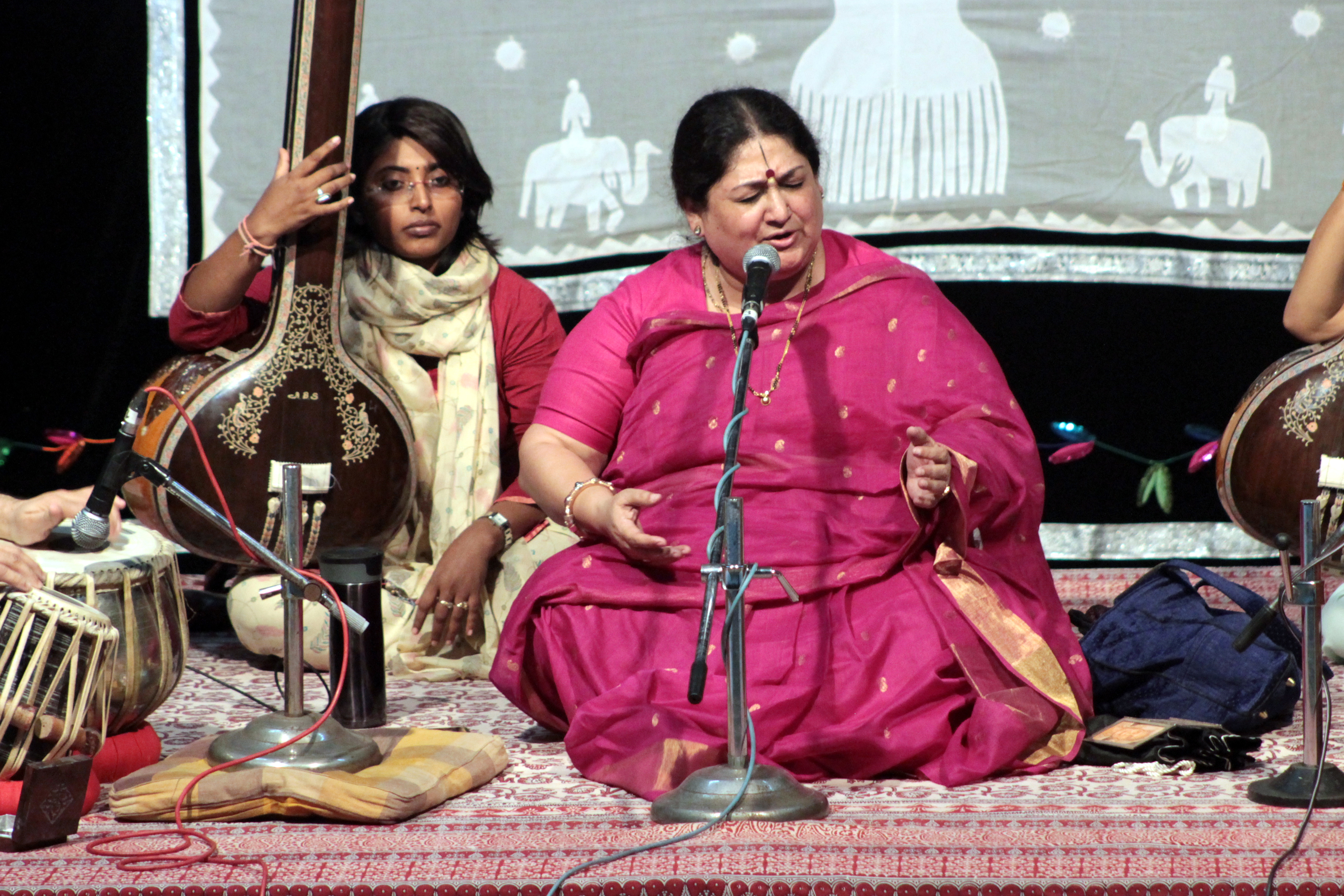
Shubha Mudgal performing at Bharat Bhavan in Bhopal in July 2015

After completing her schooling, Shubha continued to undergraduate and post graduate studies from Allahabad University. In 1982, when she moved to Delhi, she continued her musical education under Pt. Vinay Chandra Maudgalya, who was the founder of Gandharva Mahavidyalaya, a school of fine Arts. Apart from being an outstanding classical musician, Pt. Vinay Chandra Maudgalya was also an accomplished lyricist and composer who wrote the song "Hind Desh ke Niwasi", used in the animation film Ek Anek Aur Ekta by Vijaya Mulay.

In Delhi, Shubha continued her training under Pt. Vasant Thakar and other established singers such as Pt. Jitendra Abhisheki, Naina Devi and Pt. Kumar Gandharva.

On August 20, 2025, Shubha was awarded an Honorary Doctorate of Literature by Techno India University, West Bengal, in acknowledgement of her outstanding contribution as a musician.

== Performing career ==
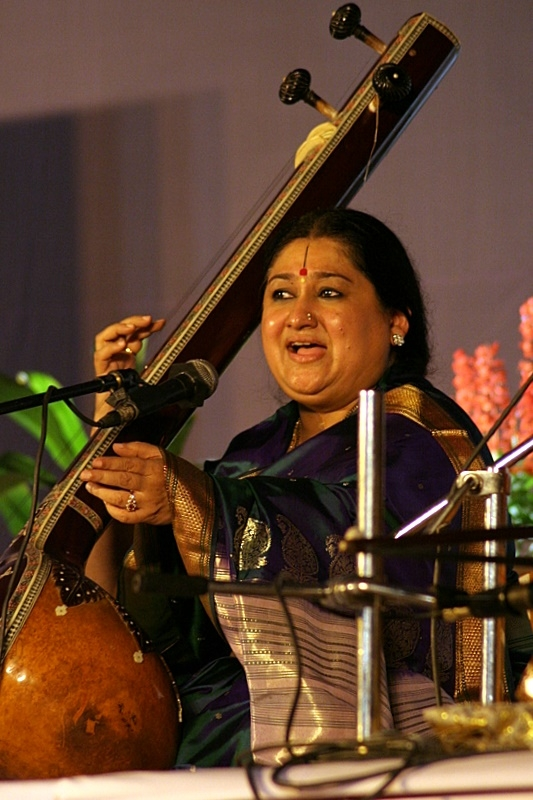
Shubha Mudgal performing in 2007

Shubha Mudgal started performing as a Hindustani classical singer in the 1980s, and gained reputation as a talented singer. In the 1990s, she started experimenting with other forms of music, including pop and fusion. She says, "I believe in music. Khayal and Thumri are my favourites, but that does not mean that I should not experiment with other forms. Why should I curtail my musical urges? ..... I want to allow the artist in me to come through. If you are a musician, how can you say, 'this one is from devotional poetry, so I am not going to sing it."' In addition to her recordings and concerts, she briefly ran a website called raagsangeet.com aimed at lovers of Indian classical.

Mudgal sang the title track of Star Plus's serial Diya Aur Baati Hum along with Kailash Kher. She also sang on the soundtrack of the film Mystic India.

In 2019, she wrote her debut book titled 'Looking for Miss Sargam: Stories of Music and Misadventure'.

== Personal life ==
In 1982, she married Mukul Mudgal, son of her guru Pt. Vinay Chandra Maudgalya. Mukul Mudgal is a lawyer and jurist. The marriage did not last. Shubha and Mukul Mudgal have one son, Dhaval Mudgal, who was the lead singer in the Delhi-based band Half Step Down.

Shubha Mudgal later married tabla maestro, Aneesh Pradhan.

== Awards ==
43rd National Film Awards

- Best Non-Feature Film Music Direction (1995) for Amrit Beej

Civilian honors

- Padma Shri (2000)

Other honors

- Gold Plaque Award for Special Achievement in Music at the 34th Chicago International Film Festival (1998) for her music in the film Dance of the Wind
- Rajiv Gandhi National Sadbhavana Award (2016) for outstanding contribution towards the promotion of communal harmony, peace and goodwill
- Honorary Doctorate of Literature awarded on August 20, 2025 by Techno India University, West Bengal in acknowledgement of her outstanding achievements as an artiste.

== Discography ==
Albums

- Ali More Angana (1996)
- Classically Yours (1999) ISBN D4HV2718
- Ab Ke Sawan
- Pyar Ke Geet (1999)
- Mann Ki Manjeree
- Kisson Ki Chadar (2003)
- Shubh Deepavali (2005)
- Anand Mangal
- The Awakening (2006)
- Jahan-E-Khusrau (2007)
- No Stranger Here (2012)

Tamil songs

- "Vaaraai En Thozhi" - Arasiyal (1997)
- "Five Star" - Five Star (2002)
- "Kanaa Kaangiren" - Ananda Thandavam (2009)
