= 2013 Indian Premier League spot-fixing and betting case =

The 2013 Indian Premier League spot-fixing and betting case arose when the Delhi Police arrested three cricketers, S. Sreeshanth, Ajit Chandila and Ankeet Chavan, on the charges of alleged spot-fixing on 16 May 2013. The three represented the Rajasthan Royals in the 2013 Indian Premier League.

In a separate case, Mumbai Police arrested the actor Vindu Dara Singh, Priyank Sepany (diamond dealer) and Chennai Super Kings Team Principal Gurunath Meiyappan for alleged betting.

== Delhi case ==
=== Criminal case ===
==== Investigation ====
Sreesanth was arrested at his friend's house, whereas Chandila and Chavan were arrested from their team hotel in Mumbai on 16 May 2013.

Delhi Police had claimed that Chavan had confessed to being involved in the spot-fixing. The police also claimed that Chandila had tried to involve other players, including Chavan, in spot-fixing under the bookies' direction.

On 17 May 2013, Delhi Police arrested Amit Singh, initially called Amit Kumar by the Police, who was a former player of Rajasthan Royals.

Sunil Bhatia, a bookie arrested by Delhi Police, said he was involved in fixing in the Indian Cricket League, the Bangladesh Premier League, and the IPL, leading to speculation that the entire fixing scandal runs even deeper. Similarly, Delhi Police Special Cell officers arrested Yahya Mohammad on 24 May 2013.

On 4 June 2013, Delhi Police said that Sreesanth, Chandila, Chavan and 23 other people arrested by them in the spot-fixing scandal were going to be charged with the provisions of Maharashtra Control of Organised Crime Act (MCOCA) since they were acting under the command of underworld dons Dawood Ibrahim and Chhota Shakeel.

Sreesanth, Ankeet Chavan, and 17 other people (including 14 alleged bookies) who were arrested by the Delhi Police were released on bail on 10 June 2013 by a Delhi court due to a lack of evidence to charge them under the MCOCA.

==== Later development ====
During investigation, Ajit Chandila has reportedly told the Delhi Police that he had allegedly contacted his teammates Brad Hodge, Kevon Cooper and Siddharth Trivedi to be part of Booking loop. The Delhi Police interrogated Siddharth, who allegedly admitted taking 03 lakh from the Bookies but returned it after becoming scared of the consequences. The Police made Siddharth Trivedi a prosecution witness.

Delhi Police filed 6,000-page Charge Sheet against 42 persons, including Sreesanth before the Patiala House Court, Delhi. Other three IPL players, Ajit Chandila, Ankeet Chavan and Amit Singh were also charge sheeted. The list of accused included Dawood Ibrahim, Chhota Shakeel and Dawood's associates Pakistan-based Javed Chutani, Salman alias Master and Ehteysham. The Police had claimed that Dawood and Shakeel, were "controlling the fixing and betting market" in cricket and they were the prime accused and the real kingpin behind the entire set of events.

06 of the accused were absconding. The court had issued non-bailable warrants (NBW) against Dawood and Shakeel for their appearance before the Court.

But in July 2015, the Patiala Court discharged all the 36 accused persons, including Sreesanth, Chandila, Singh and Ankeet Chavan, except the 06 absconding persons.

The Discharge has been challenged by the Delhi Police before the Delhi High Court, where it is presently pending.

=== Disciplinary case ===
==== Initial actions ====
Rajasthan Royals suspended the contracts of the three players until the investigation was complete. The Board of Control for Cricket in India (BCCI) suspended all the players whose names emerged in IPL betting, pending further investigation.

The International Cricket Council withdrew umpire Asad Rauf from the Champions Trophy in the wake of reports that the Mumbai Police were investigating Asad Rauf's activities in the IPL spot-fixing scandal.

In July 2015, the Rajendra Mal Lodha Committee suspended India Cements and Jaipur IPL, owners of Chennai Super Kings and Rajasthan Royals, respectively, for two years.

Sreesanth and Ankeet Chavan were given life ban from all forms of cricket by the BCCI in September 2013 while Amit Singh was banned for five years and Siddharth Trivedi was banned for 01 year only.

Chandila was given a life ban in January 2016.

==== Later developments ====
Siddharth returned to the Game in September 2014 after serving the one year Ban.

Sreesanth challenged his life ban after his getting acquitted in the Criminal case by the Patiala Court. Initially a Single Bench of Kerala High Court quashed the life ban on Sreesanth in August 2017 but the BCCI challenged this order before a Double Bench of Kerala High Court, which reversed the previous order and upheld the life ban.

Sreesanth challenged the Kerala High Court order and in March 2019, the Supreme Court lifted the life ban imposed by BCCI on Sreesanth.

Later in June 2021, the BCCI lifted the life ban imposed on Ankeet.

Finally in February 2023, the BCCI lifted the life ban imposed on Chandila as well, thereby ending the entire sequence of events emanating from the Betting scandal.

== Mumbai case ==
=== Criminal case ===
==== Investigation ====
In a separate set of events, on 18 May 2013, Mumbai Police undertook a major raid on bookie Ramesh Vyas, alleged to be running an illegal international telephone exchange connecting Indian bookies to kingpins in Pakistan and Dubai, including Dawood Ibrahim and his gang. Later he was also taken in Police custody by the Delhi Police for their own interrogation.

Vyas's interrogation and call data records allegedly led to further developments, including the arrest of actor Vindoo Dara Singh by the Mumbai Crime Branch on 21 May 2013 for his alleged complicity in the booking process, who was later taken in Police custody and interrogated.

Call records of Vindu Dara Singh in connection with the betting scandal showed that he was in frequent contact with Chennai Super Kings (CSK) team principal and BCCI president N. Srinivasan's son-in-law, Gurunath Meiyappan, to which Mumbai Police issued summons to him.

On 24 May 2013, Gurunath Meiyappan was arrested on charges of betting, conspiracy and cheating after he was questioned by the Mumbai Crime Branch.

==== Later developments ====
On 04 June 2013, Meiyappan and Vindoo Dara Singh were granted bail by a Mumbai court, while in September 2013, the Mumbai Police filed chargesheets under the Gambling Act naming 21 individuals, including Vindoo Singh, Gurunath Meiyappan and the international bookies.

In 2016, on a PIL seeking a joint probe by CBI, ED and IT Department in the 2013 IPL matches, the Bombay High Court had asked the Mumbai police crime branch to submit a progress report in the given case.

=== Disciplinary case ===
After Meiyappan's arrest on 24 May 2013, the CSK franchise immediately disowned him through an official press statement on the same date.

On 26 May 2013, BCCI suspended Meiyyappan and announced that a three-member commission would investigate Meiyappan's role in the spot-fixing and betting scandal.

Through its report dated 09 February 2014, the Supreme Court-appointed Enquiry Committee headed by Justice Mukul Mudgal found Meiyappan guilty of violating the IPL Anti-Corruption Code and being actively involved in heavy betting on IPL matches.

Later, the Supreme Court later formed Justice R M Lodha Committee to determine the exact punishments. The committee delivered a life ban to Meiyyappan, calling his acts illegal, as having brought the game of cricket into complete disrepute. The CSK franchise was also suspended from the IPL for two seasons (2016 and 2017).

Both the Chennai Super Kings (CSK) and Rajasthan Royals (RR) returned in 2018 to IPL after having served their two years ban period for IPL seasons (2016 and 2017).

== Ahmedabad case ==
During the same period, Ahmedabad Crime Branch arrested bookie Vinod Mulchandani (also known as Vinod Kathi) from the Satellite Area of Ahmedabad city on 25 May 2013. 12.8 million INR in cash, 10 gold biscuits (weighing 1 kg), laptops and mobile phones were seized from his possession.

The Ahmedabad Crime Branch stated that Mulchandani operated a vast cricket betting network stretching across Rajkot, Bhavnagar, Amreli, and Ahmedabad. He was found to be in touch with former Rajasthan Royals medium-pacer Amit Singh.

Mulchandani was granted bail by a local court on May 26, 2013, under the Gambling Act. He was immediately re-arrested by the police for "cheating by impersonation" under Section 419 of the IPC for using a SIM card registered under someone else's name, but he was again granted Bail.

The Ahmedabad case is still pending.

== Raj Kundra case ==
On 5 June 2013, Rajasthan Royals team co-owner Raj Kundra was questioned by the Delhi Police for alleged involvement in illegal betting. On 6 June 2013, Delhi Police claimed that he had confessed to them of placing bets on his IPL team through a bookie who was his friend.

On 7 June 2013, Rajasthan Royals team management said that Raj Kundra would be suspended and all his shares in the team taken back if the charges against him of betting were prove and he was suspended from the IPL by the BCCI on 10 June 2013.

The Supreme Court-appointed Justice Lodha Committee gave him a life ban from all cricket-related activities in 2015. His stake in the Rajasthan Royals was subsequently sold.

At present, Kundra is no longer facing any legal proceedings related to IPL corruption. In contrast, Kundra is locked in fierce legal battle in the UK and India as regards his 11.7% equity stake in the Rajasthan Royals franchise.

As per the Board of Control for Cricket in India, the ban on Kundra still continues, which disallows him from any involvement in IPL. Though Kundra has written a formal letter to the BCCI as regards his stake in Rajasthan Royals, the BCCI has not taken any decision on the matter.

== Judicial Interventions ==
=== Mukul Mudgal Committee ===
In October 2013, Supreme Court of India appointed a three-member committee headed by Justice (Retd.) Mukul Mudgal to probe allegations of betting and spot-fixing in the Indian Premier League (IPL). The other members of the committee were Additional Solicitor General of India L Nageswara Rao and senior advocate and former cricket umpire Nilay Dutta. Later an Assam Meghalaya Cadre IPS officer B B Misra and officers from Mumbai Police, Chennai Police and Mumbai Police, The former Indian Cricket Captain Sourav Ganguly was also associated with the process of the committee.

The committee submitted its report to the Supreme Court in February 2014.

=== Supreme court observation ===
On 25 March 2014, the Supreme Court of India told N. Srinivasan to step down from his position on his own as BCCI president to ensure a fair investigation into the betting and spot-fixing charges levied against his son-in-law Gurunath Meiyappan, who was team principal of Chennai Super Kings, else it would pass a verdict asking him to step down. The Supreme court said it was "nauseating" that N. Srinivasan continued as BCCI chief.

=== Justice Lodha Committee ===
After the report submitted by the Justice Mukul Mudgal Committee in the 2013 IPL betting scanda, the Lodha Committee was appointed by the Supreme Court on 23 January 2015 to analyse and recommend implementable actions for improving the Board of Control for Cricket in India (BCCI), assess the quantum of punishment for Gurunath Meiyappan and Raj Kundra in the IPL betting scandal, and analyse the role of Sundar Raman. The Lodha Committee report was submitted on 14 July 2015.

Lodha Committee presented three main reports. One related with punishment to Raj Kundra and Gurunath Meiyappan was presented on 14 July 2015 while the detailed report with wide and lasting recommendations was presented in December 2015. Through this report, the committee also gave clean chit to Sundar Rajan.

== See also ==
- 2012 Indian Premier League spot-fixing case
- Controversies involving the Indian Premier League
- Match fixing in the Bangladesh Premier League
- 2017 Pakistan Super League spot-fixing scandal
- Indian Premier League Controversies
