= List of Bangladesh Premier League five-wicket hauls =

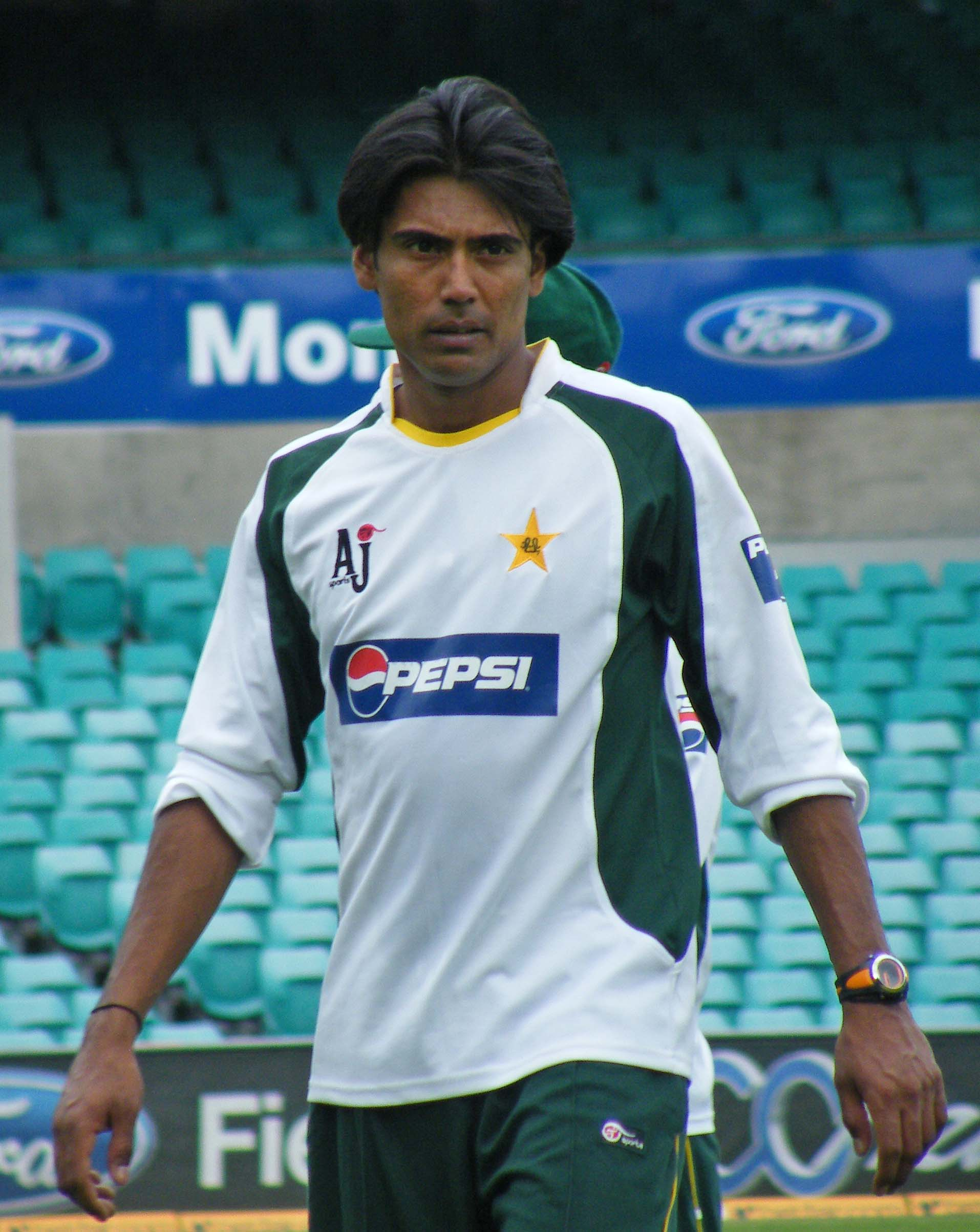
Mohammad Sami took the first five-wicket haul as well has the most economical five-wicket haul in the BPL.

The Bangladesh Premier League (BPL) is a professional Twenty20 cricket league in Bangladesh which has been held annually since its first season in 2012. (Note: With the exception of the 2014 season, which was cancelled following a major scandal of Match fixing in the Bangladesh Premier League.)

In cricket, a five-wicket haul (also known as a "five-for" or "fifer") refers to a bowler taking five or more wickets in a single innings.

== Statistics ==
- The first five-wicket haul was taken by Mohammad Sami of the Duronto Rajshahi against the Dhaka Gladiators on 27 February 2012. Sami took five wickets for six runs, which was also the most economical five-wicket haul (an economy rate of 1.8 and a bowling average of 1.2).
- Mohammad Amir of Khulna Tigers has the best bowling figures in an innings by a player in the competition. It was also the only six-wicket haul.
- Al-Amin Hossain of the Barisal Bulls took the least economical five-wicket haul, bowling with an economy rate of 9.00.
- The most recent five-wicket haul was taken by Shoriful Islam of the Chattogram Royals against Chattogram Royals in Dhaka on 16 January 2026.
- Thisara Perera and Taskin Ahmed are the only players to take multiple five-wicket hauls. Fourteen five-wicket hauls have been taken at the Sher-e-Bangla National Cricket Stadium.
- Al-Amin Hossain of Barisal Bulls is the only bowler to take a hat-trick and a five-wicket haul in the same match.
- Shakib Al Hasan and Nasir Hossain are the only players to take five-wicket haul while captaining their side. Shakib captained Dhaka Dynamites and Nasir captained the Sylhet Sixers.
- The 2017 season and 2019–20 season has seen the most number of five-wicket hauls in one season. Four five-wicket hauls had been taken in those seasons.
- In the 2013 and 2019 seasons there were no five-wicket hauls.

== Five-wicket hauls ==
Key

Symbol	Meaning
†	The bowler was man of the match

Bangladesh Premier League five-wicket hauls
No.	Bowler	Date	Ground	Team	Opposition	Inn	Overs	Mdns	Runs	Wkts	Econ	Result	Ref.
1	Mohammad Sami†	27 February 2012	Sher-e-Bangla National Cricket Stadium, Dhaka	Duronto Rajshahi	Dhaka Gladiators	1	3.2	0	6	5	1.80	Won	
2	Kevon Cooper†	23 November 2015	Sher-e-Bangla National Cricket Stadium, Dhaka	Barisal Bulls	Rangpur Riders	2	4	1	15	5	3.75	Won	
3	Al-Amin Hossain†	24 November 2015	Sher-e-Bangla National Cricket Stadium, Dhaka	Barisal Bulls	Sylhet Super Stars	2	4	0	36	5	9.00	Won	
4	Thisara Perera (1/2)	12 December 2015	Sher-e-Bangla National Cricket Stadium, Dhaka	Rangpur Riders	Comilla Victorians	1	4	0	26	5	6.50	Lost	
5	Abul Hasan	9 November 2016	Sher-e-Bangla National Cricket Stadium, Dhaka	Rajshahi Kings	Khulna Titans	1	4	0	28	5	7.00	Lost	
6	Taskin Ahmed (1/2)	18 November 2016	Zohur Ahmed Chowdhury Stadium, Chittagong	Chittagong Vikings	Rajshahi Kings	2	4	0	31	5	7.75	Won	
7	Afif Hossain†	3 December 2016	Sher-e-Bangla National Cricket Stadium, Dhaka	Rajshahi Kings	Chittagong Vikings	1	4	1	21	5	5.25	Won	
8	Hasan Ali†	20 November 2017	Sher-e-Bangla National Cricket Stadium, Dhaka	Comilla Victorians	Dhaka Dynamites	1	3.3	0	20	5	5.71	Won	
9	Shakib Al Hasan	21 November 2017	Sher-e-Bangla National Cricket Stadium, Dhaka	Dhaka Dynamites	Rangpur Riders	1	3.5	0	16	5	4.17	Lost	
10	Shafiul Islam	27 November 2017	Zohur Ahmed Chowdhury Stadium, Chittagong	Khulna Titans	Rajshahi Kings	2	4	0	26	5	6.25	Won	
11	Nasir Hossain†	3 December 2017	Sher-e-Bangla National Cricket Stadium, Dhaka	Sylhet Sixers	Chittagong Vikings	1	4	0	31	5	7.75	Won	
12	Thisara Perera† (2/2)	13 December 2019	Sher-e-Bangla National Cricket Stadium, Dhaka	Dhaka Platoon	Cumilla Warriors	2	4	0	30	5	7.50	Won	
13	Wahab Riaz†	30 December 2019	Sher-e-Bangla National Cricket Stadium, Dhaka	Dhaka Platoon	Rajshahi Royals	2	3.4	1	8	5	2.18	Won	
14	Robert Frylinck†	8 January 2020	Sher-e-Bangla National Cricket Stadium, Dhaka	Khulna Tigers	Cumilla Warriors	2	4	1	16	5	4.00	Won	
15	Mohammad Amir†	13 January 2020	Sher-e-Bangla National Cricket Stadium, Dhaka	Khulna Tigers	Rajshahi Royals	2	4	0	17	6	4.25	Won	
16	Mustafizur Rahman†	3 February 2022	Sher-e-Bangla National Cricket Stadium, Dhaka	Comilla Victorians	Chattogram Challengers	1	4	0	27	5	6.75	Won	
17	Mukidul Islam	7 February 2023	Sher-e-Bangla National Cricket Stadium, Dhaka	Comilla Victorians	Fortune Barishal	1	3.1	0	23	5	7.3	Won	
18	Aamer Jamal†	7 February 2024	Sher-e-Bangla National Cricket Stadium, Dhaka	Comilla Victorians	Khulna Tigers	2	4	0	23	5	5.75	Won	
19	Imran Tahir†	13 February 2024	Zohur Ahmed Chowdhury Stadium, Chattogram	Rangpur Riders	Khulna Tigers	2	4	0	26	5	6.5	Won	
20	Abu Haider†	19 February 2024	Zohur Ahmed Chowdhury Stadium, Chattogram	Rangpur Riders	Fortune Barishal	1	4	0	12	5	3.0	Won	
21	Taskin Ahmed† (2/2)	2 January 2025	Sher-e-Bangla National Cricket Stadium, Dhaka	Durbar Rajshahi	Dhaka Capitals	1	4	0	19	7	4.8	Won	
22	Shoriful Islam†	16 January 2026	Sher-e-Bangla National Cricket Stadium, Dhaka	Chattogram Royals	Noakhali Express	1	3.5	0	9	5	2.35	Won	
