= Shanti Swarup Bhatnagar =

Indian chemist

Sir Shanti Swarup Bhatnagar OBE, FNI, FASc, FRS, FRIC, FInstP
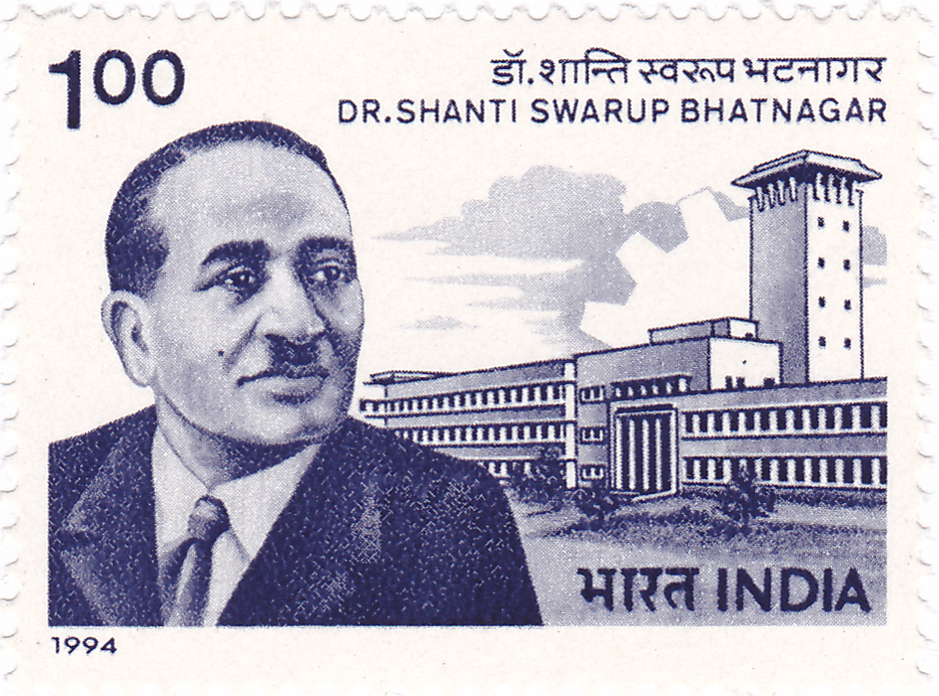
- Bhatnagar on a 1994 stamp of India
- Born: 21 February 1894; Bhera, Punjab Province, British India (now in Punjab, Pakistan)
- Died: 1 January 1955 (aged 60); New Delhi, India
- Education: University of the Punjab; University College London
- Known for: CSIR India
- Awards: Padma Bhushan (1954); Knight Bachelor (1941); OBE (1936); Fellow of the Royal Society (1943)
- Scientific career
- Fields: Physical chemistry Colloid chemistry
- Workplaces: Council of Scientific and Industrial Research; Banaras Hindu University
- Thesis: Solubilities of bi- and trivalent salts of higher fatty acids in oils and their effect on surface tension of oils
- Doctoral advisor: Frederick G. Donnan

Sir Shanti Swarup Bhatnagar (21 February 1894 – 1 January 1955) was an Indian colloid chemist, academic and scientific administrator. The first director-general of the Council of Scientific and Industrial Research (CSIR), Bhatnagar is revered as the Father of Research Laboratories in India. He was also the first Chairman of the University Grants Commission (UGC).

In 1958, to honour his name and legacy, the Indian Council of Scientific and Industrial Research (CSIR) instituted the Shanti Swarup Bhatnagar Prize for Science and Technology for scientists who have made significant contributions in various branches of science.

== Early life ==
Shanti Swarup Bhatnagar was born in the Bhera region of British India, in a Hindu Kayastha family. His father, Parmeshwari Sahai Bhatnagar, died when he was eight months old, and he spent his childhood in the house of his maternal grandfather, an engineer, who helped him develop a liking for science and engineering. He enjoyed building mechanical toys, electronic batteries, and string telephones. From his maternal family he also inherited a gift of poetry. He completed his elementary education from the Dayanand Anglo-Vedic High School, Sikandrabad (Bulandshahr). In 1911, he joined the newly established Dayal Singh College, Lahore (which was later moved to New Delhi, India after independence) where he became an active member of the Saraswati Stage Society and earned a good reputation as an actor. He wrote an Urdu one-act play called Karamati (Wonder Worker), the English translation of which earned him the Saraswati Stage Society prize and medal for the best play of the year in 1912. Bhatnagar passed the Intermediate Examination of the Punjab University in 1913 in first class and joined the Forman Christian College, where he obtained a BSc in physics in 1916, and an MSc in chemistry in 1919.

== Education and early research ==
Shanti Swarup Bhatnagar was awarded a scholarship by the Dayal Singh College Trust to study abroad, and he left for America via England. However, he could not find open berths on English ships, as they were all reserved for American troops, who were then being demobilised due to the First World War. The trustee permitted him to join the University College London under chemistry professor Frederick G. Donnan. He earned his Doctorate in Science in 1921. While in London, he was supported by the British Department of Scientific and Industrial Research with a fellowship of £250 a year.

In August 1921, he returned to India and immediately joined the newly established Banaras Hindu University (BHU) as a professor of chemistry, where he remained for three years. He wrote the ‘Kulgeet’, or University anthem. Justice N. H. Bhagwati, the then Vice-Chancellor of BHU said: "Many of you perhaps do not know that besides being an eminent scientist, Professor Bhatnagar was a Hindi poet of repute and that during his stay in Banaras, he composed the ‘Kulgeet’ of the University. Professor Bhatnagar is remembered with reverence in this University and will continue to be so until this University exists." He then moved to Lahore as a Professor of Physical Chemistry and Director of University Chemical Laboratories of the University of the Punjab. This portion of his career was the most active period of his life in original scientific work. His research interests included emulsions, colloids, and industrial chemistry, but his fundamental contributions were in the field of magneto-chemistry, the use of magnetism for the study of chemical reactions. In 1928 he and K.N. Mathur jointly developed the Bhatnagar-Mathur Magnetic Interference Balance, which was one of the most sensitive instruments at the time for measuring magnetic properties. It was exhibited at the Royal Society Soiree in 1931 and it was marketed by Messers Adam Hilger and Co, London.

== Professional career ==
Shanti Swarup Bhatnagar's first industrial problem was developing the process for converting bagasse (peelings of sugarcane) into food-cake for cattle. This was done for Sir Ganga Ram, the Grand Old Man of Punjab. He also solved industrial problems for Delhi Cloth & General Mills, J.K. Mills Ltd. of Kanpur, Ganesh Flour Mills Ltd. of Layallapur, Tata Oil Mills Ltd. of Bombay, and Steel Brothers & Co. Ltd. of India.

His major innovation was an improvement of the procedure for drilling crude oil. The Attock Oil Company at Rawalpindi (representative of Messers Steel Brothers & Co London) had confronted a peculiar problem, wherein the mud used for the drilling operation was hardened upon contact with saline water, thereby clogging the drill holes. Shanti Swarup Bhatnagar realised that this problem could be solved by colloidal chemistry. He added an Indian gum, which had the remarkable property of lowering the viscosity of the mud suspension and of increasing at the same time its stability against the flocculating action of electrolytes. M/s Steel Brothers was so pleased that they offered Bhatnagar a sum of Rs. 1,50,000/- for research work on any subject related to petroleum. The company placed the fund through the university and it was used to establish the Department of Petroleum Research under the guidance of Shanti Swarup Bhatnagar. Investigations carried out under this collaborative scheme included deodorisation of waxes, increasing flame height of kerosene and utilisation of waste products in the vegetable oil and mineral oil industries. Recognizing the commercial success of the research, the company increased the fund, and extended the period from five years to ten.

Shanti Swarup Bhatnagar persistently refused any personal monetary benefit from his research fundings, and instead advocated for strengthening research facilities at the university. Meghnad Saha wrote to Shanti Swarup Bhatnagar in 1934 saying, "You have hereby raised the status of the university teachers in the estimation of public, not to speak of the benefit conferred on your Alma Mater".

Shanti Swarup Bhatnagar wrote jointly with K. N. Mathur Physical Principles and Applications of Magnetochemistry which is considered a standard work on the subject.

=== Establishment of CSIR ===
The first industrial research organisation in India was created as an Industrial Intelligence and Research Bureau, which came into operation in April 1935 under the Indian Stores Department. With its limited budget of Rs. 1.2 lakhs per year, the bureau was virtually inactive. In 1939, there was a strong movement to abolish the bureau, and to replace it with a Board of Scientific and Industrial Research, similar to the British BSIR. Under the persuasive pressure of Arcot Ramaswamy Mudaliar, the Board of Scientific and Industrial Research (BSIR) was formed on 1 April 1940 for a period of two years. Shanti Swarup Bhatnagar, as a leading scientist of the time, was appointed as the director, and Mudaliar became the chairman. The BSIR had an annual budget of Rs. 5 lakhs which was placed under the Department of Commerce. Shanti Swarup Bhatnagar persuaded the government to set up an Industrial Research Utilisation Committee (IRUC) in early 1941 for further investment into industrial research. Mudaliar also won the demand for an establishment of Industrial Research Fund, and that it should have an annual grant of Rs 1 million for a period of five years, at the Central Assembly in Delhi at its session on 14 November 1941. These finally led to the constitution of the Council of Scientific and Industrial Research (CSIR) as an autonomous body, which came into operation on 28 September 1942. The BSIR and IRUC became the advisory bodies to the governing body of the CSIR. In 1943, the governing body approved the proposal mooted by Shanti Swarup Bhatnagar to establish five national laboratories – the National Chemical Laboratory, the National Physical Laboratory, the Fuel Research Station vvnvv, and the Glass and Ceramics Research Institute. This was the beginning of scientific laboratories in India.

== Later years ==
Shanti Swarup Bhatnagar played a significant part along with Homi Jehangir Bhabha, Prasanta Chandra Mahalanobis, Vikram Sarabhai and others in the building of India's post-independence science and technology infrastructure and policies. Prime Minister Jawaharlal Nehru was a proponent of scientific development, and after India's independence in 1947, the Council of Scientific and Industrial Research (CSIR) was set up under the chairmanship of Dr. Shanti Swarup Bhatnagar. He became its first Director-General, and by his works he is largely remembered for having established various chemical laboratories in India. He established a total of twelve national laboratories such as Central Food Processing Technological Institute, Mysore, National Chemical Laboratory, Pune, the National Physical Laboratory, New Delhi, the National Metallurgical Laboratory, Jamshedpur, the Central Fuel Institute, Dhanbad, in addition to numerous other laboratories. While at CSIR, he mentored a number young scientists of the time who were working at the Indian Association for the Cultivation of Science (IACS) in Kolkata, including Syamadas Chatterjee, Santilal Banerjee (MSc Gold Medalist- Dacca University and a DSc from the US, who later moved to the National Physical Laboratory in Delhi at Bhatnagar's request), and Asutosh Mookherjee. Shanti Swarup Bhatnagar also closely followed the work of C.V. Raman and Kariamanickam Srinivasa Krishnan at IACS on the Raman Effect and in particular the work Krishnan and his partner, Santilal Banerjee, were doing on the magnetism of small crystals.

He also served as Secretary of the Ministry of Education and Educational Adviser for the government. He played a role both in the constitution and deliberations of the Scientific Manpower Committee Report of 1948. "It may be pointed out that this was the first-ever systematic assessment of the scientific manpower needs of the country in all aspects which served as an important policy document for the government to plan the post-independent S&T infrastructure." Shanti Swarup Bhatnagar was a university professor for nineteen years from 1921 until 1940. First at the Banaras Hindu University and then at the Punjab University and he had a reputation as a teacher. It was as a teacher that he himself was most happy. His research contribution in the areas of magnetochemistry and physical chemistry of emulsion were widely recognised. He also did considerable work in applied chemistry. He played an instrumental role in the establishment of the National Research Development Corporation (NRDC) of India, which bridged the gap between research and development.

Bhatnagar was responsible for the initiation of the Industrial Research Association movement in the country. He constituted the one-man Commission in 1951 to negotiate with oil companies for starting refineries and this ultimately led to the establishment of many oil refineries in different parts of the country. He induced many individuals and organisations to donate liberally for the cause of science and education.

He died of a heart attack on 1 January 1955, at the age of 60.

== Honours and recognition ==
Shanti Swarup Bhatnagar was elected one of the first Fellows of the Indian Academy of Sciences (FASc) in 1934; he was appointed a Foundation Fellow of the National Institute of Sciences of India (FNI; now the Indian National Science Academy) the following year. (Note: Prior to 1970, the Indian National Science Academy was named the "National Institute of Sciences of India", and its fellows bore the post-nominal "FNI". The post-nominal became "FNA" in 1970 when the association adopted its present name.) For his contributions to pure and applied chemistry, Bhatnagar was appointed an Officer of the Order of the British Empire (OBE) in the 1936 New Year Honours List. The British government knighted him in the 1941 New Year Honours List for his contributions to the advancement of science. Bhatnagar was appointed a Fellow of the Institute of Physics (FInstP) in 1942, and was also appointed a Fellow of the Royal Institute of Chemistry (FRIC) that year. In 1943 the Society of Chemical Industry, London, elected him as Honorary Member and later as Vice-President. Bhatnagar was elected a Fellow of the Royal Society (FRS) in 1943.

In independent India, he was the President of the Indian Chemical Society, National Institute of Sciences of India and the Indian National Science Congress. He was awarded the Padma Bhushan by the Government of India in 1954.

An Indian science award, the Shanti Swarup Bhatnagar Prize for Science and Technology was created in his honour.
