= Vinayakrao Patwardhan =

Indian singer (1898–1975)

- Born: 22 July 1898; Miraj, India
- Died: 23 August 1975 (aged 77); Pune, India
- Other name: Pandit Vinayakrao Patwardhan

Pandit Vinayak Narayan Patwardhan (22 July 1898 – 23 August 1975) was an Indian vocalist of Gwalior gharana (style of singing) of Indian classical music. As a disciple of Vishnu Digambar Paluskar, the founder of Akhil Bharatiya Gandharva Mahavidyalaya Mandal, he dedicated his life to the promotion of Hindustani music.

== Early life ==
Vinayakrao's uncle Keshav Rao Koratkar was his first music teacher. In 1907, he went to Gandharva Mahavidyalaya at Lahore, where he was taught by Vishnu Digambar Paluskar.

== Career ==
Vinayakrao accepted teaching assignments at the various branches of the Gandharva Mahavidyalaya, including those in Bombay, Nagpur and Lahore. Vinayakrao's high-pitched voice was popular with the masses, and specifically caught the attention of actor/singer Bal Gandharva. On one occasion, the Gwalior veteran Ramkrishna Buwa Vazhe offered a challenge to singers in Pune. Vinayakrao accepted this challenge and proceeded to learn complex ragas from Vazhe.

In the late 1940s, when Bhimsen Joshi was searching for a teacher, he met Vinayakrao in Jalandhar. Vinayakrao advised him to learn from Sawai Gandharva. Later, Patwardhan took up roles in Marathi musicals. Heeding his teacher's admonition about singing for films, Vinayak went to Pune and established his own branch of the Gandharva Mahavidyalaya. Despite his young age, he had decided to dedicate himself to teaching music and ignored the lure of drama and film.

Vinayakrao trained disciples who became well known, including his guru's son, D.V. Paluskar, and Sunanda Patnaik.

=== Singer ===
Vinayakrao Patwardhan's singing reflected the simple and straightforward approach to ragas, which is the characteristic of the Gwalior Gharana style. His favorite ragas included ''Bahar'', ''Adana'', ''Multani'', ''Malhar'', ''Jaijaivanti'', ''Hameer'' and ''Bhairav-bahar''. He performed in most of the important music festivals. He was one of the few practicing musicians of the time who wrote textbooks on music. In his seven-part ''Raaga Vigyan'' series, Vinayakrao described the important aspects of various ragas as well as their grammar. In his concerts and recordings, his fellow-student Narayanrao Vyas accompanied Vinayakrao.

== Recognition ==
He was awarded the Padma Bhushan award in 1972 by the President of India. He led the Indian cultural delegation to the USSR and other countries.

The Film & TV Institute of India supported a documentary on him by Vishwanath Ayengar.

== Legacy ==
One of his disciples, L.R. Kelkar, settled down in Madras (Chennai). Author Rohiniprasad initially learned the sitar from him. Among Kelkar's better-known disciples is violinist N. Rajam, who also studied with Omkarnath Thakur in Benares.
