= Banaras Hindu University Kulgeet =

Poem by Shanti Swaroop Bhatnagar

Madhur Manohar Ateev Sundar
English: So Sweet Serene, Infinitely Beautiful
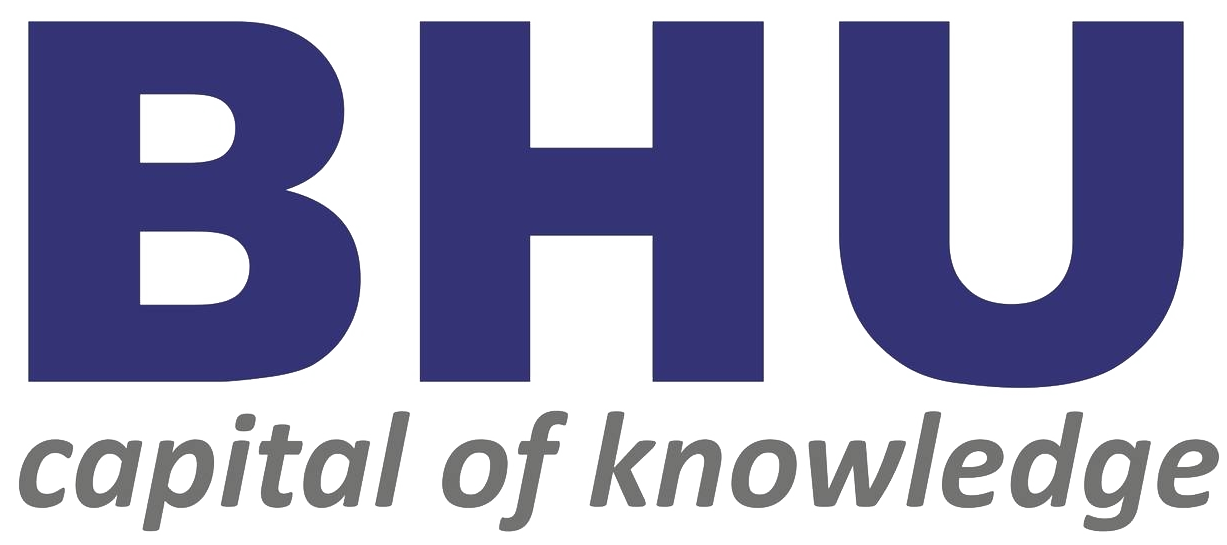
- Tagline "capital of knowledge" borrowed from the Kulgeet
- University anthem of Banaras Hindu University
- Lyrics: Shanti Swaroop Bhatnagar
- Music: Pt. Omkarnath Thakur

Audio sample
- Excerpt of the Kulgeet being sung: file; help

The Banaras Hindu University Kulgeet (BHU Kulgeet) , i.e., Madhur Manohar Ateev Sundar (transl. sweet serene, infinitely beautiful) is a poem written by Indian chemist Shanti Swaroop Bhatnagar while serving as professor at BHU. It has been composed by another professor at BHU, Pt. Omkar Nath Thakur.

The poem has been popularised and adopted in original as the official university anthem of Banaras Hindu University and is called Kulgeet. It is customary in the university for this anthem to be sung in chorus before any official event or festival of the university is started.

The last stanza of the poem is dedicated to Malviya ji, founder of the university. The university tagline in Hindi Sarv-vidya ki Rajdhani, is borrowed directly from the last line of the poem, while the English tagline capital of knowledge is a translation of the same.

The Kulgeet has often earned accolades throughout history. The Kulgeet has been presented in art, and popular media as well.

== Lyrics ==
Hindi Lyrics	Hindi romanisation	Official English translation
मधुर मनोहर अतीव सुन्दर, यह सर्वविद्या की राजधानी। यह तीन लोकों से न्यारी काशी। सुज्ञान धर्म और सत्यराशी॥ बसी है गंगा के रम्य तट पर, यह सर्वविद्या की राजधानी। मधुर मनोहर अतीव सुन्दर, यह सर्वविद्या की राजधानी॥ नये नहीं हैं ये ईंट पत्थर। है विश्वकर्मा का कार्य सुन्दर॥ रचे हैं विद्या के भव्य मन्दिर, यह सर्वसृष्टि की राजधानी। मधुर मनोहर अतीव सुन्दर, यह सर्वविद्या की राजधानी॥ यहाँ की है यह पवित्र शिक्षा। कि सत्य पहले फिर आत्म-रक्षा॥ बिके हरिश्चन्द्र थे यहीं पर, यह सत्यशिक्षा की राजधानी। मधुर मनोहर अतीव सुन्दर, यह सर्वविद्या की राजधानी॥ वह वेद ईश्वर की सत्यवाणी। बनें जिन्हें पढ़ के ब्रह्मज्ञानी॥ थे व्यास जी ने रचे यहीं पर, यह ब्रह्म-विद्या की राजधानी। मधुर मनोहर अतीव सुन्दर, यह सर्वविद्या की राजधानी॥ वह मुक्तिपद को दिलाने वाले। सुधर्म पथ पर चलाने वाले॥ यहीं फले-फूले बुद्ध, शंकर, यह राज-ऋषियों की राजधानी। मधुर मनोहर अतीव सुन्दर, यह सर्वविद्या की राजधानी॥ सुरम्य धाराएँ वरूणा अस्सी। नहाये जिनमें कबीर तुलसी॥ भला हो कविता का क्यों न आकर, यह वाग्विद्या की राजधानी। मधुर मनोहर अतीव सुन्दर, यह सर्वविद्या की राजधानी॥ विविध कला अर्थशास्त्र गायन। गणित खनिज औषधि रसायन॥ प्रतीचि-प्राची का मेल सुन्दर, यह विश्वविद्या की राजधानी। मधुर मनोहर अतीव सुन्दर, यह सर्वविद्या की राजधानी॥ यह मालवीय जी की देशभक्ति। यह उनका साहस यह उनकी शक्ति॥ प्रगट हुई है नवीन होकर, यह कर्मवीरों की राजधानी। मधुर मनोहर अतीव सुन्दर, यह सर्वविद्या की राजधानी॥	madhur manohar ateev sundar, yeh sarvidya ki rajdhani, yeh teen lokon se nyari kashi, sugyan dharm aur satyarashi. basi hai ganga ke ramya tat pr, yeh sarvvidya ki rajdhani madhur manohar ateev sundar, yeh sarvvidya ki rajdhani. naye nahi hain ye eent pathar, hai vishwakarma ka karya sundar. rachein hain vidya ke bhavya mandir, yeh sarvsrishti ki rajdhani, madhur manohar ateev sundar, yeh sarvvidya ki rajdhani. yahan ki hai yeh pavitra siksha, ki satya pahle phir aatm-raksha. bike harischandra yahin par, yeh satyasiksha ki rajdhani, madhur manohar ateev sundar, yeh sarvvidya ki rajdhani. weh ved ishwar ki satyavani, bane jinhe padh ke brahmgyani. they vyas ji ne rache yahin par, yeh brahm-vidya ki rajdhani, madhur manohar ateev sundar, yeh sarvvidya ki rajdhani. weh muktipad ko dilane wale, sudharm path par chalane waale. yahi phale phule buddh shankar, yeh raaj-rishiyon ki rajdhani, madhur manohar ateev sundar, yeh sarvvidya ki rajdhani. suramya dharayain varuna assi, nahaye jinme kabir tulsi. bhala ho kavita ka kyo na aakar, yeh vaagvidya ki rajdhani, madhur manohar ateev sundar, yeh sarvvidya ki rajdhani. vividh kala arthsahstra gayan, ganit khanij ausadhi rasayan. pratichi-prachi ka mel sundar, yeh vishwavidya ki rajdhani, madhur manohar ateev sundar, yeh sarvvidya ki rajdhani. yeh malviya ji ki deshbhakti, yeh unka saahas, ye unki shakti. pragat hui hai naveen hokar, yeh karmveero ki rajdhani, madhur manohar ateev sundar, yeh sarvvidya ki rajdhani.	So sweet serene, infinitely beautiful This is the presiding center of all learning Radiant Kashi, wonder of the three worlds Treasure-Chest of Jnana, Dharma and Satya Nesting on Ganga's bank, center of all disciplines. (So sweet, serene, infinitely beautiful) No Recent work of brick and stone Primordial design of divinity alone Mansions of Vidya, center of all creation. (So sweet, serene, infinitely beautiful) Clear here is the doctrine pure Truth first, then only one' self Home of Harishchandra, Truth's testing ground. (So sweet, serene, infinitely beautiful) The voice of God in Vedic record Constant Inspiration for soul-accord Work-shop of Veda Vyasa, center freedom for Bhrahma Vidya (So sweet, serene, infinitely beautiful) Find here the steps of freedom Tread here the path of Dharma Flaming trail Budha's and Shankara's center for philosopher-kings. (So sweet, serene, infinitely beautiful) Life-Giving waters of Varuna and Assi Sustenance of Kabir and Tulsi Fountainhead of eloquent speech and poetry. (So sweet, serene, infinitely beautiful) Music, Economics, other arts so many Maths, Mining, Medicine and Chemistry Fraternal forum of East and West, university in trust sense. (So sweet, serene, infinitely beautiful) Patriotism of Malviyaji His intrepidity and energy All in youthful manifestation, centre for men of action (So sweet, serene, infinitely beautiful)

== Code of conduct ==
The Kulgeet is sung in the university in chorus, and rarely alone. As a mark of respect, clapping after Kulgeet is prohibited. The composition by Omkarnath Thakur is the official composition. There is no official length prescribed, but the official composition usually takes around four minutes and thirty seconds.

Contributors to the Kulgeet

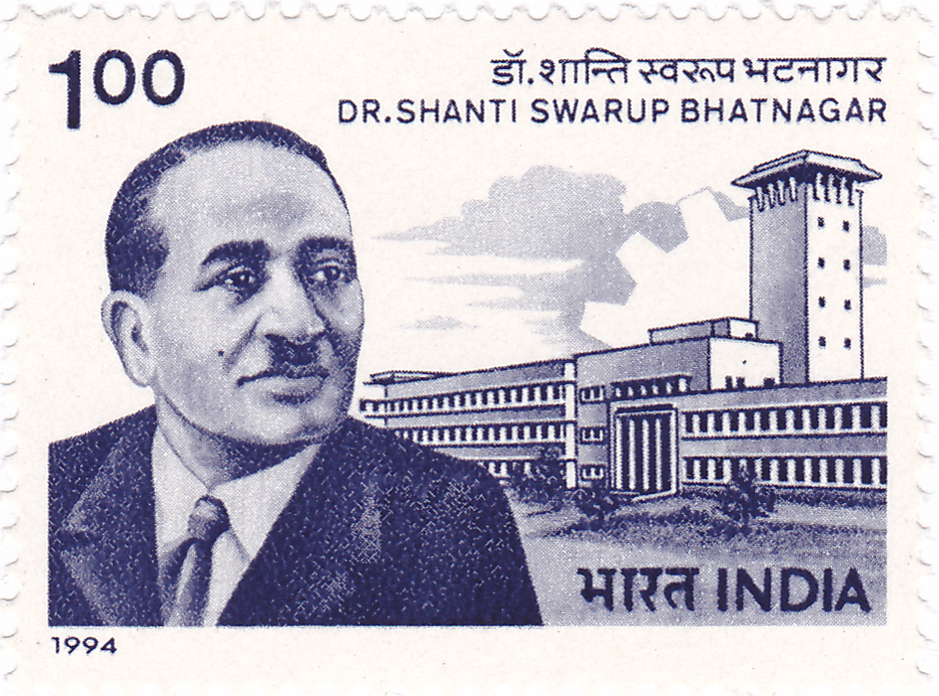
Shanti Swaroop Bhatnagar, who wrote the Kulgeet

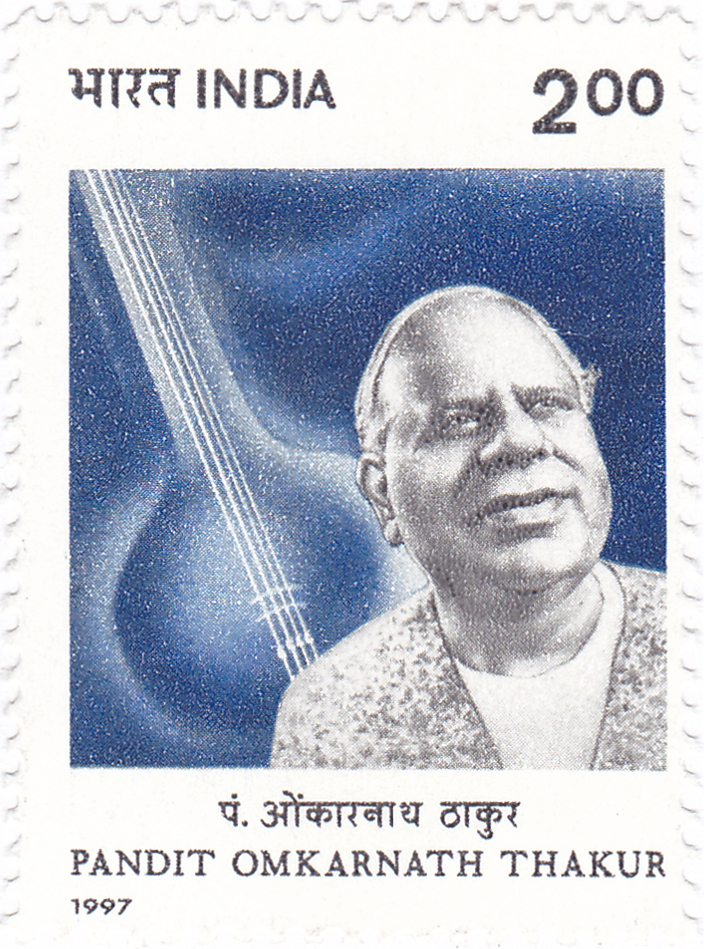
Omkarnath Thakur, who provided music for the Kulgeet

== See also ==
- Banaras Hindu University
- Shanti Swarup Bhatnagar
