= Akhil Bharatiya Gandharva Mahavidyalaya Mandal =

Institution on Indian classical music and dance

Coordinates: 19.07507°N 72.99600°E

Akhil Bharatiya Gandharva Mahavidyalaya Mandal (अखिल भारतीय गान्धर्व महाविद्यालय मंडल, "All India Music University Board") is an institution for the promotion and propagation of Indian classical music and dance. The administrative offices of ABGMVM are in Miraj, while its main music school or Sangeet Vidyalaya is in Vashi, Navi Mumbai. The institution provides training and certification in vocal music; instrumental music, including melody instruments such as sitar as well as percussion instruments such as tabla; and various classical dance forms such as Odissi, Bharata Natyam, and Kathak.

ABGMVM has laid out courses of study in these performing arts for levels ranging from Prarambhik (beginner) to Sangeetacharya (literally "teacher of music"; equivalent to a doctorate). Around 1,200 affiliated institutions throughout India and elsewhere in the world follow the ABGMVM syllabi. The ABGMVM conducts examinations based on these syllabi twice a year, in April/May and November/December, at 800 centers around the world.

== History ==
ABGMVM is built on the foundations laid by Vishnu Digambar Paluskar, who along with Vishnu Narayan Bhatkhande was responsible for the democratization and spread of musical education among the Indian middle class in the early twentieth century. On 5 May 1901, Paluskar set up a music school called Gandharva Vidyalaya in Lahore. Eventually, he moved the school to Bombay, and in 1915, inaugurated a new building for the school. However, financial and operational difficulties led to the school's closure in 1924.

After Paluskar's death in 1931, his students decided to carry on his educational work. Shortly after his death, Shankarrao Vyas and N.M. Khare convened a meeting in Ahmedabad. At this meeting, a decision was made to set up a board (mandal) that would coordinate and guide these educational activities. Thus, the Akhil Bharatiya Gandharva Mahavidyalaya Mandal was established.

Paluskar's students set up music schools throughout India. For example, Vinay Chandra Maudgalya set up a Gandharva Mahavidyalaya in Delhi in 1939. These schools followed the syllabi prescribed by ABGMVM, and students appeared for examinations conducted by that board. Over the years, the number of affiliated schools has continued to grow. Today, about 100,000 students appear for examinations conducted by ABGMVM every year.

== Examinations and Qualifications ==
ABGMVM offers the following examinations.

Year	Name	Transliteration	Literal Translation	Meaning	Equivalent Qualification
1	प्रारम्भिक	praarambhik	Of the beginning	Preliminary	
2	प्रवेशिका प्रथम	praveshikaa pratham	The first entry-level	Elementary, Part I	
3	प्रवेशिका पूर्ण	praveshikaa puurna	The entire entry-level	Elementary, Part II	Matriculation or O-level
4	मध्यमा प्रथम	madhyamaa pratham	The first of the middle	Intermediate, Part I	
5	मध्यमा पूर्ण	madhyamaa puurna	The entire middle	Intermediate, Part II	Diploma or A-level
6	विशारद प्रथम	vishaarad pratham	The first of the expert	Advanced, Part I	
7	विशारद पूर्ण	vishaarad puurna	The complete expert	Advanced, Part II	Bachelor's Degree (see note)
8	अलंकार प्रथम	alankar pratham	The first ornament	Master's, Part I	
9	अलंकार पूर्ण	alankar puurna	The entire ornament	Master's, Part II	Master's Degree
-	संगीताचार्य	sangiitaachaarya	Teacher of music	Ph.D.	Doctoral degree

Note: An individual with a Visharad qualification is considered to have equivalent musical knowledge to someone with a bachelor's degree in music. However, the Visharad by itself is not the equivalent of a bachelor's per se, as the course of study is entirely music-based and does not include the general requirements typical of bachelor's degrees. As a result, universities such as the University of Mumbai or SNDT Women's University require that individuals with a Visharad who are seeking admission to master's of music programs also have some bachelor's degree, irrespective of field, alongside the Visharad.

== Notable alumni ==
- Veena Sahasrabuddhe

== See also ==
- Gandharva Mahavidyalaya, New Delhi
