= Suhasini Mulay =

Indian actress (born 1950)

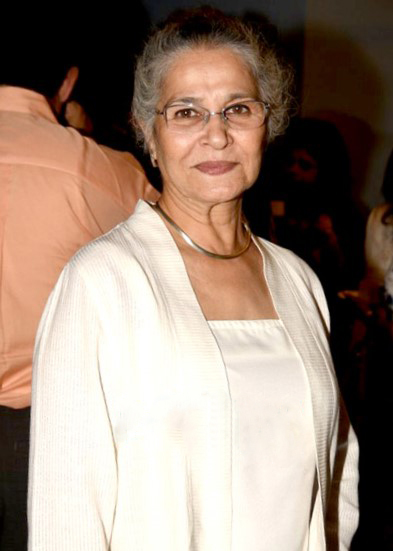
- Mulay in April 2017
- Born: 20 November 1950 (age 75); Patna, Bihar, India
- Years active: 1969–present
- Spouse: Atul Gurtu (m. 2011)
- Parent: Vijaya Mulay

Suhasini Mulay (born 20 November 1950) is an Indian actress in Assamese, Bollywood and Marathi films as well as television. She is also an acclaimed documentary filmmaker and has made over 60 documentaries, 4 of which have won four National Film Awards. She has also won a National Film Awards for Best Supporting Actress.

== Early life and education ==
Suhasini was born in a Marathi-speaking family in Patna where she spent the early part of her childhood. She lost her father when she was only three and was brought up by her mother, noted documentary filmmaker and film historian Vijaya Mulay. Suhasini was attracted to film because of her mother. She did her schooling from Ballygunge Shiksha Sadan (BSS), Kolkata.

== Personal life ==
Mulay was in an extended live-in relationship that ended in 1990. She moved to Mumbai in 2000. On 16 January 2011 she got married at Arya Samaj to a physicist, Prof. Atul Gurtu.

== Career ==
In 1965, she was chosen by Pears Soap to be its model. It was this ad film which caught Mrinal Sen's attention and he signed her for Bhuvan Shome (1969).

Though Bhuvan Shome proved to be a milestone in Indian cinema, Suhasini did not pursue acting as a career. Instead, she enrolled at the McGill University in Montreal, Canada, for a course in agricultural technology with specialisation in soil chemistry and microbiology. She also obtained a degree in mass communication, and majored in film, radio, TV, journalism and print from the same university.

Suhasini returned to India in 1975 and worked as an assistant to Satyajit Ray in the Bengali film Jana Aranya. Later she joined Mrinal Sen as an assistant director in Mrigayaa. Since then, she has been actively producing films and has made over 60 documentaries. She achieved National Film Awards for four of them. She also worked as a casting director for the 1993 film, Sardar, which was a biopic of Sardar Vallabhbhai Patel.

Almost 30 years after Bhuvan Shome, she made a great comeback to mainstream Bollywood cinema, through Gulzar's Hu Tu Tu for which she received a national award as the best supporting actress. She has been playing mother roles in Bollywood since then. She has worked on Jaane Kya Baat Hui, a television serial. She then completed the film Peeda, directed by Hemant Verma. Peeda won the best feature film award at FOG Film Festival in USA.

== Filmography ==
=== Films ===
Year	Film	Role	Notes
1969	Bhuvan Shome	Gauri	Bollywood debut
1972	Grahan		
1980	Bhavni Bhavai		
1982	Ramnagari	Ram Nagarkar's wife	
1982	Aparoopa	Aparoopa	Titular character in an Assamese film
1984	Apeksha		Hindi remake of Assamese film Aparoopa
1987	Sadak Chhap		
1993	Shatranj	Mrs. Usha D. Verma	
1999	Hu Tu Tu	Malti Bai	Won the National Film Award for Best Supporting Actress
2001	Lagaan: Once Upon A Time In India	Yashodamai	
2001	Dil Chahta Hai	Sid's Mother	
2001	Yeh Teraa Ghar Yeh Meraa Ghar	Paresh Rawal's Sister	
2002	Filhaal		
2002	Humraaz	Dadima (Raj's Grandmother)	
2002	Deewangee	Judge	
2003	Baaz: A Bird in Danger		
2003	Kuch Naa Kaho	Dr. Malhotra (Raj's Mother)	
2003	Khel	Dadi	
2004	Hum Kaun Hai?	Anita	
2005	Hanan		
2005	Page 3		
2005	Sehar	Prabha Kumar	
2005	Sitam		
2005	Vaah! Life Ho Toh Aisi	Dadi	
2006	Humko Tumse Pyaar Hai	Durga's Mother	
2006	Yun Hota Toh Kya Hota	Namrata	
2006	Naksha		
2006	Hope and a Little Sugar	Mrs. Oberoi	
2007	Big Brother		
2007	Dhamaal	Landlord	
2007	Speed		
2008	Mithya		
2008	Jodhaa Akbar	Rani Padmawati	
2008	My Friend Ganesha 2		
2008	Chamku		
2009	13B	Mother in Serial	
2009	Mere Khwabon Mein Jo Aaye		
2009	The White Land		
2009	Tumhare Liye		
2009	Bits And Pieces		
2009	Rang Rasiya		
2013	Club 60	Mrs. Mansukhani	
2014	Gandhi of the Month	Mrs. Kurien	
2015	Prem Ratan Dhan Payo	Savitri Devi, Grandmother of Rajkumari Maithili	
2015	Hamari Adhuri Kahani	Hari's Mother	
2016	Rocky Handsome	Carla Aunty	
2016	Mohenjo Daro	Laashi, Maham's wife	
2016	Peeda	Mrs. Malik	
2017	Basmati Blues	Mrs. Patel	
2024	Sur Lagu De		
2025	De De Pyaar De 2	Naani	
2026	Ikkis	Maheshwari Khetarpal	

=== Television ===
Year	Show	Role	Notes
2007	Chaldi Da Naam Gaddi		
2001	Maan		
2006	Kyunki Saas Bhi Kabhi Bahu Thi	Kaushalya Malhotra (Tanya's Mother)	
2006	Jabb Love Hua		
2006	Kulvaddhu		
2002-2006	Piya Ka Ghar	Iravati Bhavanishankar Sharma, Bhavanishankar's wife, Indu's sister-in-law, Rakesh, Prateek, Jayanti and Avinash's mother, Yashoda, Kaveri and Rimjhim's mother-in-law	
	Mamta		
	Jaane Kya Baat Hui		
	Tithir Atithi		
	Ek Tha Rusty	Miss Bean	
	Virasaat		
	Princess Dollie Aur Uska Magic Bag		
	Geet – Hui Sabse Parayi	Maan's grandmother	Star One
	Dil Se Diya Vachan		
	Kya Mast Hai Life		TV show on Disney Channel
	Hum- Ek Chote Gaon Ki Badi Kahani		Retelecasting and remake of Hum Log
	Devon Ke Dev...Mahadev		Parvati's grandmother
2012	Hongey Judaa Na Hum		Aniruddh's grandmother
2013-14	Desh Ki Beti Nandini		Rajveer's grandmother
2014	Udaan		Shakuntala Singh
2014	Everest		Shikha maa
2015	MTV Warrior High	Anvesha Rajput	
2020	Mismatched	Rishi's Grandmother(Dadi)	
2022	The Fame Game	Kalyani	TV Show on Netflix
2024	Dil Dosti Dilemma	Akhtar Begum	TV Show on Prime Video
2025	Itti Si Khushi	Surekha Ajji	2 episodes

== Accolades ==
Year	Award	Category	Film	Result	Ref.
1983	National Film Awards	National Film Award for Best Non-Feature Film	An Indian Story	Won	
1988	National Film Awards	National Film Award for Best Non-Feature Film	Bhopal: Beyond Genocide	Won	
1989	National Film Awards	National Film Award for Best Educational/Motivational/Instructional Film	Chitthi	Won	
1998	National Film Awards	National Film Award for Best Arts/Cultural Film	The Official Art Form	Won	
2000	Filmfare Awards	Best Supporting Actress	Hu Tu Tu	Nominated	
2000	National Film Awards	Best Supporting Actress	Hu Tu Tu	Won	
