= List of fellows of the Royal Society elected in 1943 =

This article lists fellows of the Royal Society elected in 1943.

== Fellows ==
1. Sir Shanti Swaroop Bhatnagar
2. Ivan de Burgh Daly
3. Patrick Alfred Buxton
4. Sir John Augustine Edgell
5. Arthur James Ewins
6. Arthur Felix
7. Sir Alexander Fleming
8. Sir John Jacob Fox
9. William Michael Herbert Greaves
10. Sydney Cross Harland
11. George Armand Robert Kon
12. Sir Andrew McCance
13. Wilder Penfield
14. Guy Ellcock Pilgrim
15. Sir Reginald Edward Stradling
16. Sir Charles Sykes (metallurgist)
17. John Lighton Synge
18. George Frederick James Temple
19. Alexander Logie Du Toit
20. Solly Zuckerman, Baron Zuckerman

== Foreign members ==
1. Victor Moritz Goldschmidt
2. Bernardo Houssay
