= Omkarnath Thakur =

Indian musical artist

Pandit Omkarnath Thakur
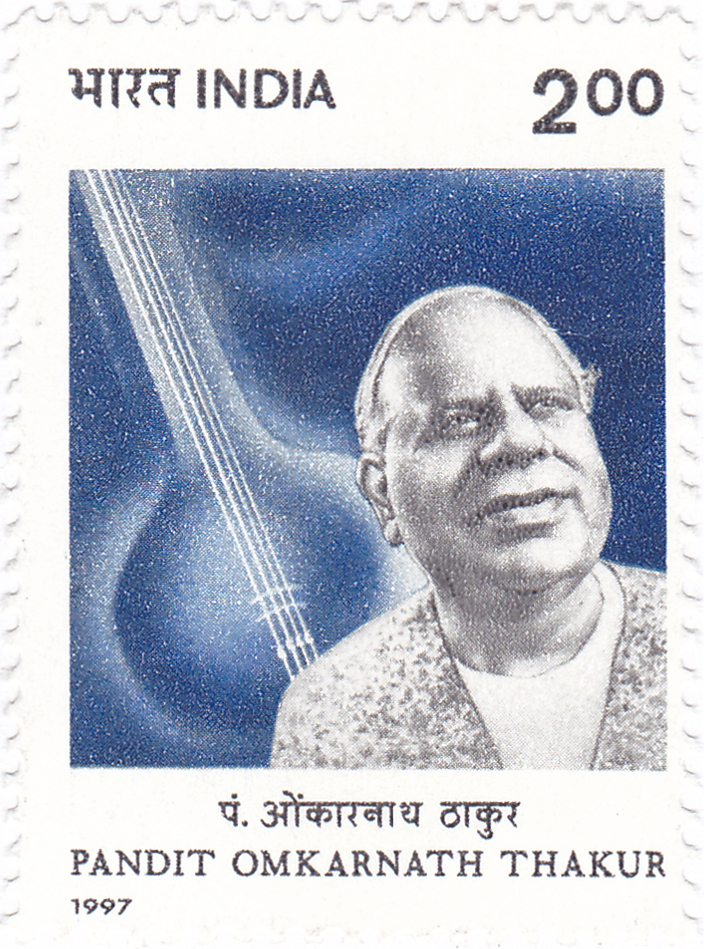
- Pandit Omkarnath Thakur

Background information
- Born: Omkarnath thakur 24 June 1897; Jahaj, Khambhat (Gujarat) Baroda State, Bombay Presidency, British India (present-day Gujarat, India)
- Died: 29 December 1967 (aged 70) Bombay, Maharashtra, India (present-day Mumbai)
- Genre: Hindustani classical music
- Occupations: Professor, musicologist, composer
- Instruments: singing, israj, mridangam, harmonium
- Years active: 1918–1960s

Pandit Omkarnath Thakur (24 June 1897 – 29 December 1967) was an Indian music teacher, musicologist and Hindustani classical singer. A disciple of classical singer Vishnu Digambar Paluskar of Gwalior gharana and the founder of Akhil Bharatiya Gandharva Mahavidyalaya Mandal he became the principal of Gandharva Mahavidyalaya, Lahore, and later went on become the first dean of the music faculty at Banaras Hindu University. He also wrote the book "Sangeetanjli" vol. 1 to 6

== Early life and training ==
Thakur was born in 1897 in a village called Jahaj in the Princely State of Baroda (15 km from Khambhat in present-day Anand District, Gujarat, into a poor military family. His grandfather Mahashankar Thakur had fought in the Indian Rebellion of 1857 for Nanasaheb Peshwa. His father Gaurishankar Thakur was also in the military, employed by Maharani Jamnabai of Baroda, where he commanded 200 cavalrymen. The family moved to Bharuch in 1900, though soon the family faced financial difficulties, as his father left the military to become a renunciate (sanyasi), leaving his wife to run the household, thus by the age of five Thakur started helping her out by doing various odd jobs, in mills, Ramlila troupe and even as a domestic help. When he was fourteen his father died.

Impressed by his singing Thakur and his younger brother Ramesh Chandra were sponsored by a wealthy Parsi philanthropist Shahpurji Mancherji Dungaji in c. 1909 to train in Hindustani classical music in the Gandharva Mahavidyalaya, a music school in Bombay, under classical singer Vishnu Digambar Paluskar. Thakur soon became a singer in the style of the Gwalior gharana and started accompanying his guru and other musicians. Later in his career he developed his own distinct style. Eventually, he made his concert debut in 1918, though he continued his training under his guru, Paluskar, until the latter's death in 1931.

== Career ==
Thakur was made the principal of a Lahore branch of Paluskar's Gandharva Mahavidyalaya in 1916. Here he became acquainted with the Patiala gharana singers like Ali Baksh and Kale Khan, paternal uncle of Bade Ghulam Ali Khan. In 1919, he returned to Bharuch and started his own music school, Gandharva Niketan. During the 1920s, Thakur worked for the non-cooperation movement of Mahatma Gandhi on a local level, as he became the President of Bharuch District Congress Committee of Indian National Congress. His performances of patriotic song Vande Mataram were a regular feature of annual sessions of the Indian National Congress. Thakur toured Europe in 1933 and became one of the first Indian musicians to perform in Europe. During this tour, he performed privately for Benito Mussolini. Thakur's wife Indira Devi died the same year and he began to concentrate exclusively on music.

Thakur's work as a performer and musicologist led to the creation of a music college at Banaras Hindu University that emphasized both, here he was first dean of the music faculty. Thakur has composed the university anthem, the Banaras Hindu University Kulgeet. He wrote books on Indian classical music and its history. Thakur's work is criticized in contemporary music literature as ignorant of the contribution of Muslim musicians, which he blamed for deteriorating classical music.

Thakur performed in Europe until 1954 and received the Padma Shri in 1955 and the Sangeet Natak Akademi Award in 1963. He retired in 1963 and was awarded honorary doctorates from Banaras Hindu University in 1963 and Rabindra Bharati University in 1964. Having survived a heart attack in 1954, he suffered a stroke in July 1965, which left him partially paralyzed for the last two years of his life.

== See also ==
- List of people on stamps of India

== Bibliography ==
- A Comparative Study of Khyāl Style: Pandit Omkarnath Thakur and His Student Pandit B.R. Bhatt, by Harriotte Cook Hurie. Wesleyan University, 1980.
- Wade, Bonnie C. (2001). "Thakur, Omkarnath". In Sadie, Stanley (ed.). The New Grove dictionary of music and musicians. Vol. 25 (2nd ed.). London: Macmillan Publishers. pp. 336–337. ISBN 0-333-60800-3.
- Wade, Bonnie C. (1984). Khyāl:Creativity within North India's Classical Music Tradition. Cambridge: Cambridge University Press. pp. 258–260. ISBN 0-521-25659-3.
