= Atul Gurtu =

Indian physicist

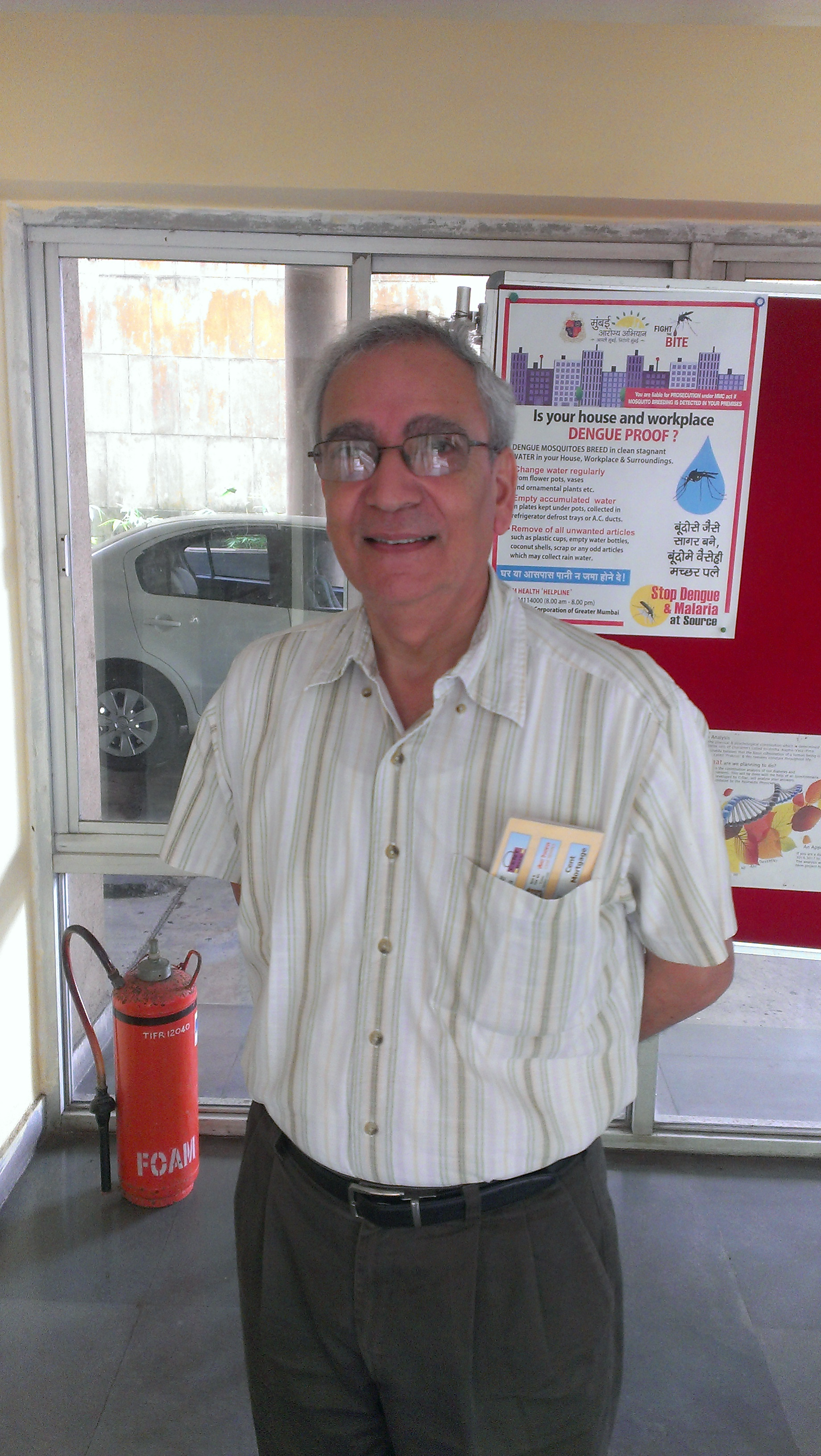
- On 17 September 2013, Atul Gurtu at TIFR, Mumbai.
- Born: 16 January 1946 (age 80); Lahore
- Citizenship: Indian
- Education: Auckland House, Shimla; Lawrence School Sanawar; Panjab University, Chandigarh; TIFR; King Abdulaziz University
- Known for: His work in experimental high energy physics, including leadership in CERN collaborations
- Spouse(s): Promila Bawa (1971–2006) (her death); Suhasini Mulay (2011–present)
- Children: Ashish (1974–1991)
- Scientific career
- Fields: High energy physics (Particle physics)
- Workplaces: Tata Institute of Fundamental Research (TIFR), Mumbai; King Abdulaziz University, Jeddah, Saudi Arabia
- Thesis: (1971)

Atul Gurtu (born 16 January 1946) is a high energy physicist in India. He joined the Tata Institute of Fundamental Research (TIFR), Mumbai, in 1971 and retired in 2011 as a senior professor, after a career spanning four decades in particle physics research.

== Early life and education ==
Gurtu was born in Lahore in 1946. Gurtu studied at Auckland House in Shimla, and later at the Lawrence School Sanawar in Kasauli. He then attended Panjab University in Chandigarh, obtaining his PhD in 1971, and thereafter joined the Tata Institute of Fundamental Research (TIFR) in Mumbai in 1969.

== Career ==
Gurtu is a particle physics researcher who participated in numerous experimental projects in collaboration with CERN, Geneva, from 1969 to 2011, as part of the high energy physics group at TIFR. From 2003 to 2011, he led a 70-member Indian team which participated in the CERN Compact Muon Solenoid (CMS) experiment at the Large Hadron Collider.

From 2011 to 2012, he was Distinguished Professor at King Abdulaziz University, Jeddah, Saudi Arabia. Since retiring from TIFR in 2011, he has continued contributions to the Particle Data Group collaboration.

== Personal life ==
Gurtu married Promila Bawa in 1971. They had one child, Ashish (1974–1991), who was disabled. Promila died in 2006. In January 2011, he married National Film Award-winning actress Suhasini Mulay, whom he met on Facebook.
