= Match fixing in the Bangladesh Premier League =

Bangladesh Cricket Board (BCB) president, Nazmul Hassan, stated on 30 May 2013 that a Bangladesh player was questioned by the ICC's Anti-Corruption and Security Unit (ACSU). He later confirmed the identity of the player as Mohammad Ashraful, the youngest centurion in test cricket.

== Initial allegation ==
The Bangladesh Premier League (BPL) had its first brush with controversy in 2012, before the tournament had even begun. Mashrafe Mortaza, one of Bangladesh's leading fast bowlers and captain of the Dhaka Gladiators, reported to team management that BPL matches could be fixed using a potential spot-fixing approach by a fellow cricketer. According to Gladiators media manager Minhaz Uddin Khan, this information was relayed to the BPL. Furthermore, an ICC ACSU officer was already in Dhaka to examine the situation.

Later, in BPL 2013 additional allegations about match fixing emerged. The alleged match took place on 2 February, between the Dhaka Gladiators and the Chittagong Kings teams. The 28-year-old Ashraful was allegedly paid about one million taka (US$12,800) to lose the match. However, according to local media, the check he received was returned for insufficient funds. He was also allegedly involved in fixing another match 10 days later against the Barisal Burners: his team lost by seven wickets.

== Investigation ==
Mohammad Ashraful was investigated several times for 10,000 cr

== Action against fixing ==
Former Bangladesh spinner Shariful Haque was banned in September 2012 after an inquiry found him guilty of spot-fixing during the first edition of the BPL.

A Pakistani national was arrested in separate spot-fixing charges in 2012. In March 2013, the BCB handed down a 10-year ban to umpire Nadir Shah after a sting operation by an Indian TV channel found him apparently willing to fix matches for cash.

The Bangladesh Cricket Board (BCB) has decided "not to involve" former captain Mohammad Ashraful in any form of cricket until the ICC's ACSU submits its report.

== See also ==
- Controversies involving the Indian Premier League
- 2012 Indian Premier League spot-fixing case
- Match fixing
