= Vijaya Mulay =

Indian film director (1921–2019)

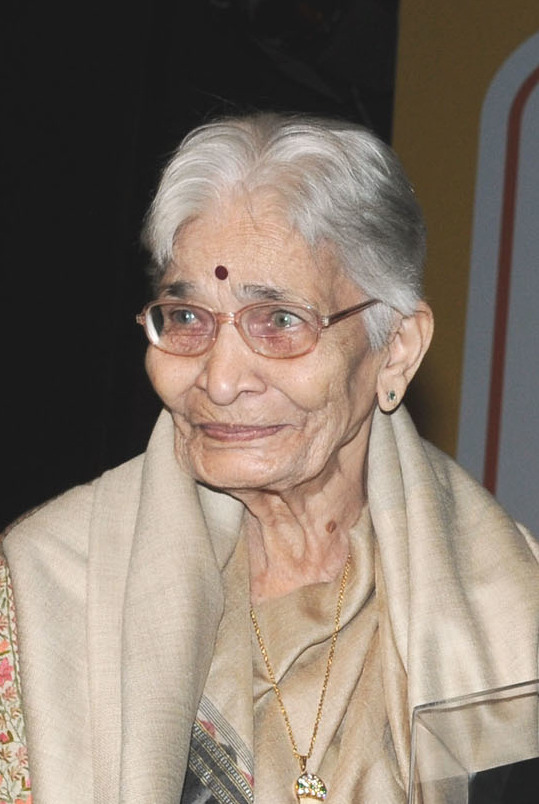
- Mulay in 2010
- Born: 16 May 1921; Bombay
- Died: 19 May 2019 (aged 98); Delhi
- Occupations: Documentary filmmaker, film historian
- Relatives: Suhasini Mulay (daughter), Atul Gurtu (son-in-law)

Vijaya Mulay (16 May 1921 – 19 May 2019) was a documentary filmmaker, film historian, writer, educationist and researcher.

She was lovingly called Akka in film circles. Her close friendships with Satyajit Ray, Louis Malle, Mrinal Sen and other film personalities gave her a unique perspective into Indian cinema and influenced her work. Her body of work has shaped how India is viewed by Indian and non-Indian filmmakers. She is the mother of National Award winning actor Suhasini Mulay and Atul Gurtu the high energy physicist is her son-in-law. Vijaya Mulay is remembered for her animation film Ek Anek Aur Ekta which won the National Film Award for Best Educational Film.

== Life and career ==
Vijaya Mulay was born in Bombay, India.

=== Bombay, Patna, Bihar ===
Vijaya Mulay on location – Hampi, Karnataka

In 1940, Vijaya accompanied her husband when he was transferred to Patna, Bihar. Compared to the cosmopolitan Bombay the pre-independence Patna seemed to her like a place from another universe. But Patna University allowed women to study privately and Vijaya enrolled for a bachelor's degree.

English films were shown half price on Sunday mornings at the city theatres known as Bioscopes. Vijaya began her love affair with the medium and started grasping the idiom of cinema.

=== Patna to Leeds, UK ===
Vijaya Mulay with the late Indian prime minister Indira Gandhi

In 1946 she won a state scholarship to study in University of Leeds, UK for master's degree in Education.

While there, Vijaya realised that the ordinary Britisher was hardly like the English "Burra Saabs" (Great Masters) back in India.

From an interview with Vijaya Mulay on her days in the UK – I had gone to Britain, with an anti-colonial distaste for the British people and with the sole purpose of studying for my degree. I was on my guard, ready to take offence at the slightest insult or remark derogatory to me or to India, whether imagined or real. But I soon found out that the ordinary English people were hardly like the 'Burra Sahibs' that one saw back home.

On post-war cinema in UK – The Workers’ Unity Theatre played to full houses. Films from the Soviet Union and Eastern Europe ran often. I saw film classics, experimental films, and socialist cinema. I also gained a better perspective and understanding of the cinematic art by joining the university film society. Film viewing, once a casual pastime, became my serious passion.

=== 1959: Satyajit Ray and India's first Film Society ===
Vijaya returned to Patna in 1949 and actively worked in the local film society. In 1954, she moved to New Delhi when Government of India appointed her as an Education Officer. Vijaya also found time to open Delhi Film Society and in 1959, eight film societies came together to form Federation of Film Societies of India with Satyajit Ray as the founding president and Vijaya Mulay and the critic Chidanand Das Gupta as joint secretaries.

After the death of Satyajit Ray, Vijaya was appointed the President of FFSI.

=== Film Censor Board of India, Louis Malle and The Tidal Bore ===
Vijaya Mulay on location with the Indian musician Gangubai Hangal

In 1962 Vijaya was deputed to Bombay to work at the Central Board of Film Certification.

From an interview with Vijaya Mulay – For five years I sat as the presiding officer with other four members from an approved panel that judged Indian and foreign films. It gave me an insight into the biases of panellists that coloured their judgement of a film's suitability for public viewing. My work with the Film Censor Board proved a mixed blessing. I had to see films that ordinarily I would have walked out of in sheer boredom.

In 1966 Vijaya was transferred to Calcutta and the following year Louis Malle came to the city with a French film delegation. When they met Malle had an instant dislike towards the woman censor officer. The dislike blossomed into a close friendship that lasted till Louis Malle's death in 1995.

Both Satyajit Ray and Louis Malle helped Vijaya in making her first film – 'The Tidal Bore' (about the 15 feet tidal bore coming from Bay of Bengal like a wall of water on the Hooghly River). Malle sent negative stock from France and Ray voiced the commentary.

Government of India selected 'The Tidal Bore' as the official entry to the Mannheim Film Festival. Later Film Federation of India screened the film in theatres across the country.

=== Multimedia, UNICEF and CET/NCERT ===
When US loaned India its ATS-6 satellite (ATS-6 had one video and two audio channels) UNICEF hired Vijaya to produce test modules for children in the 6 to 9 age group. In 1975, Vijaya was asked to head the CET – Center for Educational Technology to prepare educational films for broadcast to over 2400 villages in rural districts and programming in 4 languages.

Ek Anek Aur Ekta, the 1974 animation film scripted and directed by Vijaya Mulay and produced by Center for Educational Technology is very popular amongst the many generations of Indians.

The CET, NCERT projects equipped her to later continue research on the field of education and on using media for development.

After her retirement from NCERT, Vijay took up a benchmark survey of distance education in Indian universities and collected data from 23 (out of the 25) universities that were then providing such education. This work was finished in 1983.

The next 3 years, Vijaya worked as the Project Coordinator at the University Grants Commission and was responsible for the program Countrywide Classroom for undergraduates.

=== From Rajahs and Yogis to Gandhi and Beyond: images of India in International Films of the 20th century ===
While going through some of Louis Malle's letters Vijaya realised how India had changed him. Similar experiences of Jean Renoir while making The River, and Roberto Rossellini prompted her to find out what about India excites and motivates the non-Indians, especially the filmmakers.

From Rajahs and Yogis to Gandhi and Beyond: India in International Cinema was released by Seagull books in August 2008 and by the University of Chicago Press the same year.

Excerpt from the first chapter of 'From Rajahs and Yogis to Gandhi'

The little Gangotri, from where the river Ganga (the Ganges) emerges is a small rill; it becomes the majestic river Ganga as more rivers join it to expand its basin and flow. My project too has followed a similar path and has become bigger and bigger though unlike Ganga, it is neither majestic nor holy. I look upon this study as a personal journey of a film buff to understand what India meant to different people at different points of time as expressed in films.

== Accolades ==
- The Government of India honoured Vijaya Mulay with the V. Shantaram Award for Lifetime Achievement for documentaries at the Mumbai International Film Festival – MIFF, 2002.
- Vikram Sarabhai Life Time Achievement award for educational communication in 1999.
- President of the Federation of Film Societies of India.
- Led the Indian Educational Technology Mission to the USA in 1975.
- Member Secretary of the Education commission for Goa and other former Portuguese territories in 1962.
- Developed a multimedia package through SITE (Satellite Instructional Television Experiment) for training of more than 48,000 primary school teachers. Widely considered to be a path-breaking program in the area of educational technology.
- Several of her films received National awards and awards at International Film Festivals including Delhi, New York, Teheran.
