= Nilay Dutta =

Indian cricket umpire and administrator (died 2021)

Personal information
- Full name: Nilayananda Dutta
- Born: 1952 or 1953
- Died: 19 September 2021 (aged 68)
- Role: Umpire

Umpiring information
- ODIs umpired: 1 (1990)
- Source: ESPNcricinfo, 31 May 2021

Nilayananda Dutta (1952/3 – 19 September 2021) was an Indian lawyer, cricket administrator, and cricket umpire. The only international match he officiated in was a One Day International in 1990. He was a senior advocate in the Supreme Court of India and an official of the Assam Cricket Association. He was a member of the three-member Mudgal Committee (headed by Justice Mukul Mudgal and comprising former Additional Solicitor General of India L Nageswara Rao as the other member) formed to probe the 2013 Indian Premier League spot-fixing and betting case.

== See also ==
- List of One Day International cricket umpires
