= Ek Anek Aur Ekta =

- Directed by: Vijaya Mulay; Bhimsain
- Screenplay by: Vijaya Mulay
- Produced by: Films Division of India
- Edited by: Waman B. Bhosle and Guru Dutt Shirali (Waman-Guru)
- Music by: Vasant Desai
- Production company: National Centre for Education Technology (NCERT)
- Release date: 1974
- Running time: 7:07
- Country: India
- Language: Hindi

Ek Anek Aur Ekta or "One, Many, and Unity" (also known as Ek Chidiya, Anek Chidiyan after the title song) is a traditionally animated short educational film released by the Films Division of India (Government of India). It was released in 1974. It was aired on the public broadcaster channel Doordarshan and became very popular among children.

== Summary ==
The film was intended to teach the value of unity and teamwork to children (Unity in Diversity). It also contains the message of how India is stronger if its citizens stand united, regardless of cultural differences. It begins with a group of children playing in a garden with one of them asking his elder sister, "Didi, yeh anek kya hota hai?", or in English, "Sis, what do you mean by Many?". The rest of the film is the sister's reply, using a metaphorical story of how a group of birds escape a bird catcher by uniting to recruit their friends, a group of mice.

== The team ==
The film was directed by Vijaya Mulay and Bhimsain with design, animation and creation by Bhimsain. The lyrics of Hind Desh ke Niwasi were written by Vinay Chandra Maudgalya. Sadhna Sargam sang Ek Chidiya, Anek Chidiyan. The assistants were S.M. Hasan, Mahesh Taavre and Girish Rao. The film won the National Film Award for Best Educational Film. It was the first film from the animation studios of then Center for Education Technology. The film also won the Best Children's Film award in Japan. The film is considered to be one of India's greatest examples of animation story-telling, and well remembered by the 80s generation as a classic illustration of Anekta mein Ekta.
