= Gandharva Mahavidyalaya, New Delhi =

Music school in India

Gandharva Mahavidyalaya New Delhi is an institution established in 1939 to popularize Indian classical music and dance. The Mahavidyalaya (school) came into being to perpetuate the memory of Pandit Vishnu Digambar Paluskar, the great reviver of Hindustani classical music, and to keep up the ideals set down by him. The first Gandharva Mahavidyalaya was established by him on 5 May 1901 at Lahore. The New Delhi school follows the syllabi set by the Akhil Bharatiya Gandharva Mahavidyalaya Mandal.

== History ==
Gandharva Mahavidyalaya, New Delhi was established in 1939 by Pandit Vinay Chandra Maudgalya, disciple of Pandit Vinayakrao Patwardhan, an exponent from Gwalior Gharana. Today it is the oldest music school in Delhi and is headed by his son and a noted Hindustani classical singer, Pandit Madhup Mudgal.

== Courses ==
The institution imparts theoretical and practical training in the following branches of music and dance:

1. Hindustani Music: Vocal
2. Hindustani Music Instrumental: Sitar, Bansuri (Lateral bamboo flute), Tabla, Harmonium and Violin
3. Indian Classical Dance: Kathak, Bharatanatyam and Odissi

The courses of study followed by the Mahavidyalaya are those approved by the Akhil Bharatiya Gandharva Mahavidyalaya Mandal. It has nearly 1200 affiliated institutions and 800 Exam Centers across India. In 2007, the number of students enrolled exceeded 100,000.

== Branches ==
Gandharva Mahavidyalaya, New Delhi was established in 1939 by Padma Shri Pt. Vinay Chandra Maudgalya from the Gwalior gharana. It was Initially established in Prem House, Connaught Place, New Delhi and also branched out in old Delhi at Kamla Nagar near Delhi University. In 1972 The new building in Deen dayal Upadhyaya Marg was established and it now headed by Pt. Vinay Chandra Maudgalaya's son Pt. Madhup Mudgal since 1995. It has over 1,200 students and a faculty of 60 teachers. Gandharva Mahavidyalaya has also been organizing the annual "Vishnu Digamber Festival" in Delhi, for many years now. There is no branch of Gandharva Mahavidyalaya, New Delhi elsewhere in Delhi. It is affiliated to Akhil Bhartiya Gandharva Mahavidyalaya, Miraj.

The Mahavidyalaya is guided by a Music Advisory Board composed of top ranking learned and veteran musicians of India.

== Admission ==
The following Certificates / Diplomas of ABGMM are awarded to the successful students:

1. Sangeet Praveshika (2 years course) i.e., equivalent to matriculation

i.e., equivalent to senior secondary

1. Sangeet Madhyama (2 years course) i.e., equivalent to Diploma
2. Sangeet Visharad (3 years course) i.e., equivalent to Degree (Bachelor of Music)
3. Sangeet Alankar (2 years course) i.e., equivalent to M.A. (Masters of Music)

Admission to Gandharva Mahavidyalaya is open to persons of all ages, castes, creeds and religions. Male and female students are trained separately.

There is one session in a year - in July. Applicants are required to undergo a Music Syllabus preliminary test. Only those who clear this test are granted admission.

== See also ==
- Eastern fare music foundation
- Delhi University
