= L. Nageswara Rao =

Indian judge (born 1957)

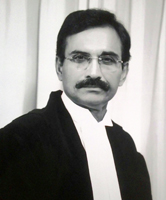

Judge of the Supreme Court of India
- In office 13 May 2016 – 7 June 2022
- Nominated by: T. S. Thakur
- Appointed by: Pranab Mukherjee

Additional Solicitor General of India
- In office 7 June 2014 – 15 December 2014
- Appointed by: Pranab Mukherjee
- In office August 2013 – May 2014
- Appointed by: Pranab Mukherjee
- In office 8 August 2003 – 2004
- Appointed by: A. P. J. Abdul Kalam

Personal details
- Born: Lavu Nageswara Rao; 8 June 1957 (age 68) Pedanandipadu, Andhra Pradesh, India

Lavu Nageswara Rao is a former judge of the Supreme Court of India. He is the seventh person elevated directly from the bar to the Supreme Court and was sworn in on 13 May 2016. He was a senior advocate and a former Additional Solicitor General of India.

== Early life ==
Rao hails from Pedanandipadu in Guntur district of Andhra Pradesh. He was educated at Loyola Public School, Guntur, JKC College, Guntur and at TJPS College, Guntur.

== Career ==
He practiced in Andhra Pradesh High Court before shifting his practice to the Supreme Court of India. He was designated as a senior advocate in 2000. He was one of the most highly paid lawyers in the country.

He appeared in Karnataka High Court for J. Jayalalithaa in the disproportionate assets case and was successful in reversing the trial court judgement and getting her acquitted. One of the last cases he argued before the Supreme Court of India was the NEET (National Eligibility cum Entrance Test) case in which he appeared for State of Tamil Nadu and Christian Medical College.

He was elevated as a judge of Supreme Court of India on 13 May 2016.

He retired on 7 June 2022.

== Law Officer ==
He served as an additional solicitor general of India three different times. First under NDA government from 8 August 2003 until his resignation in 2004. UPA Government appointed him as A.S.G. in August 2013 and he resigned in May 2014. His third stint as A.S.G. was from 7 June to 15 December 2014 under the present Government.

== Commission of Inquiry ==
He was also a member of the Supreme Court-appointed Mudgal Committee headed by Justice Mukul Mudgal and comprising senior advocate and former cricket umpire Nilay Dutta as the other member. The committee is tasked with conducting an independent inquiry into allegations of corruption, betting and spot-fixing in Indian Premier League matches.
