= Mudgal Committee =

Mudgal Committee was formed on the directions of the Supreme Court of India in a Public Interest Litigation (PIL) titled Board of Control for Cricket in India vs Cricket Aasociation Of Bihar & Ors, through its order dated 08 October 2013.

The Supreme Court appointed a Committee comprising Justice Mukul Mudgal (Retired Chief Justice of the Punjab and Haryana High Court) as Chairman, L. Nageswara Rao, Senior Advocate and Additional Solicitor General and Nilay Dutta, Senior Advocate, Gauhati High Court as Members.

The Charter of duty assigned to this Committee was to enquire into the allegations of betting and spot-fixing in the IPL matches against Gurunath Meiyappan, the team principal of Chennai Super Kings, Raj Kundra, team owner of Rajasthan Royals and the players with regard to their involvement in spotfixing and betting. The BCCI had been directed to bear all the expenses of the Committee. The Chairman and the Members of the Committee were given a fee of Rs. 1 lakh per working day to be paid by the BCCI.

The Committee presented its Interim report to the Supreme Court on 9 February, 2014.

Thereafter the Supreme Court enlarged the scope of the Mudgal Committee through its order dated 16 May 2014. Here, the scope of the enquiry was enlarged to enquire into the allegations made in the Interim Report against 13 persons including the then BCCI President M N Srinivasan. For this the Supreme Court provided the services of an IPS officer B B Mishra of Assam- Meghalaya Cadre, along with Police officers from Delhi Police, Mumbai Police and Chennai Police.

Former Indian cricket captain Sourav Ganguly later joined the committee to assist it.

== Committee's Preliminary Report ==
In a preliminary report submitted to the Supreme Court on 9 February, 2014, the committee presented specific factual findings and actionable recommendations to curb corruption.

It recommended a complete ban on post-match parties and private events by sponsors, citing them as hotbeds for corrupt activities. The Committee recommended that the outsiders, not directly connected with the process, must be strictly barred from official team functions unless there is some prior authorization. It also asked the BCCI to legally bind its sponsors from hiring banned players for media roles of TV or radio commentators during their period of ban. The Committee recommended that the IPL Governing Council must convey an emphatic zero-tolerance policy against corruption by imposing severe, stringent punishments.

The Committee found the allegations of betting against both Meiyappan and Raj Kundra as being prima-facie proven true. It also presented a sealed envelope investigation report with allegations against 13 prominent individuals, other than Meiyappan and Raj Kundra, to the Supreme Court.

== Committee's Final report ==
The Committee presented an interim Report dated 29 August 2014 before the Supreme Court after which the Supreme Court granted it additional time to complete its report.

It presented a detailed report on 01 November 2014. This report presented definitive factual findings as regards the allegations instead of the policy recommendations that had already been presented in the Preliminary report in February 2014, as being presented hereinafter-

=== Gurunath Meiyappan ===
Based on scientific forensic voice-matching and the testimony of security personnel, Gurunath Meiyappan's role as a team official of the Chennai Super Kings was confirmed and the allegations of betting against him stood proved. However, the allegations of matching fixing required further investigation.

- Meiyappan had indulged in betting through Vindoo Dara Singh, who was in turn in direct communication with bookies and punters like Vikram Aggarwal; that he had placed bets both in favour of and against the Chennai Super Kings; and that he had bet on IPL matches not involving the Chennai Super Kings.
- The Committee found that Meiyappan had "violated Section 2.2.1 and 2.14 of the IPL Operational Rules for bringing the game in disrepute, Articles 2.2.1, 2.2.2 and 2.2.3 of the IPL Anti Corruption Code for his acts of betting and Articles 2.4.4 of the IPL Code of Conduct for Players and Team Offices for bringing disrepute to the game of cricket."
- The franchisee owner of the Chennai Super Kings had failed to that Meiyappan as a Team Official "had complied with the BCCI Anti-Corruption Code, IPL Operational Rules, IPL Regulations and found it in violation of Section 4.4.1 of the IPL Operational Rules and Clause 11.3 of the franchises agreement."

=== Raj Kundra ===
The committee reported that the allegations of betting and spot fixing against Raj Kundra, as the owner of the Jaipur Cricket Private Limited, the owners of the Rajasthan Royals were established, and he placed bets in violation of the IPL Anti-Corruption Code and that local police investigations into his activities were abruptly and without reason halted by the Rajasthan Police.

=== Sundar Raman ===
The IPL CEO knew "a contact of a bookie and contacted him eight times in one season" but denied knowledge about his betting activities. He was also found to have full information about Meiyyappan and Kundra but did not take the required action as expected from him as the CEO.

=== N Srinivasan ===
The then ICC chairman and ex BCCI president N Srinivasan was found to be not involved in any fixing activity, but he was found to be knowing about a player violating the code of conduct but didn't act against him.

=== Allegations of Spot Fixing and Match Fixing against players ===
The committee noted that the allegations of spot fixing and matching fixing by S. Sreesanth, Ankeet Chavan, Ajit Chandila, Amit Singh and Siddharth Trivedi (Rajasthan Royals) on the basis of evidence provided by the Delhi Police were facing criminal trials and that adequate punishment had been imposed on them by the BCCI.

== Acceptance ==
Through its order dated 22 January 2015 in BCCI vs. Cricket Association of Bihar and Ors., (2015) 3 SCC 251], the Supreme Court, which had constituted the Mudgal Committee, accepted its November report and formed the Lodha Committee to further investigate the matter that led to the Lodha report having sweeping impact on the functioning of BCCI and IPL.
