= 2014 Champions League =

2014 Champions League may refer to:

== Football ==
- 2013–14 UEFA Champions League
- 2014–15 UEFA Champions League
- 2014 AFC Champions League
- 2014 CAF Champions League

== Cricket ==
- 2014 Champions League Twenty20
