= 2014 Mumbai Indians season =

Indian cricket team season

Mumbai Indians
2014 season
- Coach: John Wright
- Captain: Rohit Sharma
- IPL: Playoffs
- CLT20: Qualifier stage

Mumbai Indians (MI) are a franchise cricket team based in Mumbai, India, which plays in the Indian Premier League (IPL). They were one of the eight teams that took part in the 2014 Indian Premier League. They were captained by Rohit Sharma for the second season in succession.

Mumbai Indians reached the Eliminator of playoff stage in the 2014 IPL where they were defeated by the Chennai Super Kings. Mumbai qualified for the 2014 Champions League Twenty20, but did not advance from the group stage.

== Squad ==
- Players with international caps before the start of 2014 IPL are listed in **bold**.

No.	Name	Nationality	Birth date	Batting Style	Bowling Style	Notes
Batsmen
9	**Ambati Rayudu**	India	23 September 1985 (aged 28)	Right-handed	Right-arm off break	Occasional wicketkeeper
14	Apoorv Wankhade	India	14 March 1992 (aged 22)	Right-handed		
54	**Lendl Simmons**	Trinidad and Tobago	27 May 1985 (aged 28)	Left-handed	Right-arm medium	Overseas
48	**Michael Hussey**	Australia	25 May 1975 (aged 38)	Right-handed	Right-arm medium	Overseas
45	**Rohit Sharma**	India	30 April 1987 (aged 26)	Right-handed	Right-arm off break	Captain
All-rounders
19	Shreyas Gopal	India	4 September 1993 (aged 20)	Right-handed	Right-arm leg break	
55	**Kieron Pollard**	Trinidad and Tobago	12 May 1987 (aged 26)	Right-handed	Right-arm medium-fast	Overseas; Vice-Captain
78	**Corey Anderson**	New Zealand	13 December 1990 (aged 23)	Left-handed	Left-arm medium-fast	Overseas
111	Jalaj Saxena	India	15 December 1986 (aged 27)	Right-handed	Right-arm off break	
Wicket-keepers
5	CM Gautam	India	8 March 1986 (aged 28)	Right-handed		
7	Sushant Marathe	India	16 October 1985 (aged 28)	Left-handed	Right-arm leg break	
27	Aditya Tare	India	7 November 1987 (aged 26)	Right-handed		
51	Ben Dunk	Australia	11 March 1987 (aged 27)	Left-handed		Overseas
Bowlers
3	**Harbhajan Singh**	India	3 July 1980 (aged 33)	Right-handed	Right-arm off break	
12	Jasprit Bumrah	India	6 December 1993 (aged 20)	Right-handed	Right-arm fast	
8	**Josh Hazlewood**	Australia	8 January 1991 (aged 23)	Left-handed	Right-arm fast-medium	Overseas
30	**Pragyan Ojha**	India	5 September 1986 (aged 27)	Left-handed	Slow left arm orthodox	
33	Pawan Suyal	India	15 October 1989 (aged 24)	Right-handed	Left-arm fast-medium	
34	**Zaheer Khan**	India	7 October 1978 (aged 35)	Right-handed	Left-arm fast-medium	
67	**Krishmar Santokie**	Jamaica	20 December 1984 (aged 29)	Left-handed	Left-arm fast-medium	Overseas
99	**Lasith Malinga**	Sri Lanka	28 August 1983 (aged 30)	Right-handed	Right-arm fast	Overseas
90	**Marchant de Lange**	South Africa	13 October 1990 (aged 23)	Right-handed	Right-arm fast	Overseas

== Indian Premier League ==
=== Season standings ===
Pos	Team	Pld	W	L	NR	Pts	NRR
1	Kings XI Punjab (R)	14	11	3	0	22	0.968
2	Kolkata Knight Riders (C)	14	9	5	0	18	0.418
3	Chennai Super Kings (3)	14	9	5	0	18	0.385
4	Mumbai Indians (4)	14	7	7	0	14	0.095
5	Rajasthan Royals	14	7	7	0	14	0.060
6	Sunrisers Hyderabad	14	6	8	0	12	−0.399
7	Royal Challengers Bangalore	14	5	9	0	10	−0.428
8	Delhi Daredevils	14	2	12	0	4	−1.182

- Top 4 teams were qualified for the playoffs
- advanced to the Qualifier and 2014 Champions League Twenty20 Group Stage
- advanced to the Eliminator and 2014 Champions League Twenty20 Group Stage
- advanced to the Eliminator and 2014 Champions League Twenty20 Qualifying Stage

=== Match log ===
No.	Date	Opponent	Venue	Result	Scorecard
1	April 16	Kolkata Knight Riders	Abu Dhabi	Lost by 41 runs	Scorecard
2	April 19	Royal Challengers Bangalore	Dubai	Lost by 7 wickets	Scorecard
3	April 25	Chennai Super Kings	Dubai	Lost by 7 wickets	Scorecard
4	April 27	Delhi Daredevils	Sharjah	Lost by 6 wickets	Scorecard
5	April 30	Sunrisers Hyderabad	Abu Dhabi	Lost by 15 runs	Scorecard
6	May 3	Kings XI Punjab	Mumbai	Won by 5 wickets, MoM – Corey Anderson 1/17(2 Overs) & 35(25)	Scorecard
7	May 6	Royal Challengers Bangalore	Mumbai	Won by 19 Runs, MoM – Rohit Sharma 59*(35)	Scorecard
8	May 10	Chennai Super Kings	Mumbai	Lost by 4 wickets	Scorecard
9	May 12	Sunrisers Hyderabad	Hyderabad	Won by 7 Wickets, MoM – Ambati Rayudu 68(46)	Scorecard
10	May 14	Kolkata Knight Riders	Cuttack	Lost by 6 wickets	Scorecard
11	May 19	Rajasthan Royals	Ahmedabad	Won by 25 Runs, MoM – Mike Hussey 56(39)	Scorecard
12	May 21	Kings XI Punjab	Mohali	Won by 7 Wickets, MoM – Lendl Simmons 100*(61)	Scorecard
13	May 23	Delhi Daredevils	Mumbai	Won by 15 Runs, MoM – Mike Hussey 56(33)	Scorecard
14	May 25	Rajasthan Royals	Mumbai	Won by 5 Wickets, MoM – Corey Anderson 95*(44)	Scorecard
Eliminator
15	May 28	Chennai Super Kings	Mumbai	Lost by 7 Wickets	Scorecard
Overall record: 7–8. Advanced to playoffs. Qualified for 2014 Champions League Twenty20.

== Champions League Twenty20 ==
=== Qualifier standings ===
Team	Pld	W	L	NR	Pts	NRR
(New Zealand) Northern Knights (1)	3	3	0	0	12	+2.080
(Pakistan) Lahore Lions (2)	3	2	1	0	8	−0.065
(India) Mumbai Indians	3	1	2	0	4	−0.064
(Sri Lanka) Southern Express	3	0	3	0	0	−2.033

=== Match log ===
No.	Date	Opponent	Venue	Result	Scorecard
1	September 13	Lahore Lions	Raipur	Lost by 6 wickets	Scorecard
2	September 14	Southern Express	Raipur	Won by 9 wickets; MoM Lendl Simmons 76 (51)	Scorecard
3	September 16	Northern Knights	Raipur	Lost by 6 wickets;	Scorecard
Overall record: 1–2. Failed to advance
