= 2014 Kolkata Knight Riders season =

Indian Premier League team season

Kolkata Knight Riders
2014 season
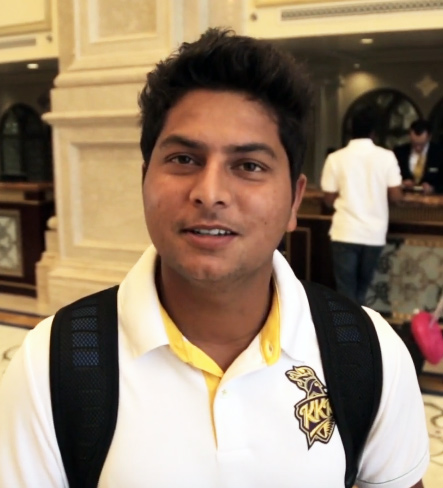
- Kuldeep Yadav with Kolkata Knight Riders in 2014
- Coach: Trevor Bayliss
- Captain: Gautam Gambhir
- Ground(s): Eden Gardens, Kolkata
- IPL: Winners
- CLT20: Runners-up
- Most runs: Robin Uthappa (660)
- Most wickets: Sunil Narine (21)

Kolkata Knight Riders (KKR) is a franchise cricket team based in Kolkata, India, which plays in the Indian Premier League (IPL). They were one of the eight teams that competed in the 2014 IPL. They were captained by Gautam Gambhir. Kolkata Knight Riders won the 2014 IPL and qualified for the Champions League T20.

== Background ==
As the 2014 IPL auctions began, Knight Riders only kept their skipper Gambhir and the spinner Sunil Narine. They bought back Jacques Kallis, Yusuf Pathan, Shakib Al Hasan, Manvinder Bisla and Ryan Ten Doeschate. New additions to the team were Robin Uthappa, Manish Pandey, Suryakumar Yadav, Morne Morkel, Umesh Yadav, Piyush Chawla, Vinay Kumar, Chris Lynn along with some other uncapped and foreign players. KKR had a good start to the seventh edition in UAE, defeating defending champions Mumbai Indians in the inaugural match. However, their performance dipped and they won only 1 out of their next 4 games played there, including a super over tie against Rajasthan Royals, which they ultimately lost on a boundary count. Their poor form continued as they lost two more matches after they were back in India, making it five losses in seven games. The team changed their batting order, promoting Robin Uthappa as an opener which worked very well as he became the highest run scorer in the tournament with 660 runs. He also scored 40+ runs in 10 consecutive matches. Sunil Narine continued his great run, being the second highest wicket taker. Knight Riders recovered from the losing streak, winning each of their next 7 games. In their last group game against the Sunrisers Hyderabad, Yusuf Pathan blitzed his way to a half century off just 15 balls, which is a record in the IPL. After the group stage, they were tied at 18 points with Chennai Super Kings but beat them to the second place in points table by a better net run rate.

They played the first Qualifier at their home ground Eden Gardens against Kings XI Punjab which they won by 28 runs and entered the final for the second time in their history. In the final at Bengaluru, they met Kings XI Punjab again and defeated them by 3 wickets in a thrilling match chasing a mammoth 200, with local boy Manish Pandey delivering his best knock of the season with a brilliant 94 in 50 balls, to win their second title in 3 years. The victory was celebrated grandly in a similar fashion to their 2012 Indian Premier League title win.

== Squad ==
- Players with international caps prior to the start of the 2014 season are listed in **bold**.

No.	Name	Nationality	Birth date	Batting style	Bowling style	Notes
Batsmen
1	Manish Pandey	(India)	10 September 1989 (aged 24)	Right-handed	Right-arm off break	
23	**Gautam Gambhir**	(India)	14 October 1981 (aged 32)	Left-handed	Right-arm leg break	Captain
37	**Robin Uthappa**	(India)	11 September 1985 (aged 28)	Right-handed	Right-arm medium	Occasional wicketkeeper
50	**Chris Lynn**	(Australia)	10 April 1990 (aged 24)	Right-handed	Slow left-arm orthodox	Overseas
63	Debabrata Das	(India)	22 September 1986 (aged 27)	Right-handed	Right-arm leg break	Occasional wicketkeeper
212	Suryakumar Yadav	(India)	14 September 1990 (aged 23)	Right-handed	Right-arm medium	
All-rounders
3	**Jacques Kallis**	(South Africa)	16 October 1975 (aged 38)	Right-handed	Right-arm fast-medium	Overseas
9	**Yusuf Pathan**	(India)	17 November 1982 (aged 31)	Right-handed	Right-arm off break	
12	**Andre Russell**	(Jamaica)	29 April 1988 (aged 25)	Right-handed	Right-arm fast-medium	Overseas
27	**Ryan ten Doeschate**	(Netherlands)	30 June 1980 (aged 33)	Right-handed	Right-arm medium-fast	Overseas
75	**Shakib Al Hasan**	(Bangladesh)	24 March 1987 (aged 27)	Left-handed	Slow left-arm orthodox	Overseas
Wicket-keepers
36	Manvinder Bisla	(India)	27 December 1984 (aged 29)	Right-handed		
Bowlers
19	**Umesh Yadav**	(India)	25 October 1987 (aged 26)	Right-handed	Right-arm fast	
21	**Piyush Chawla**	(India)	24 December 1988 (aged 25)	Left-handed	Right-arm leg break	
23	**Vinay Kumar**	(India)	12 February 1984 (aged 30)	Right-handed	Right-arm medium-fast	
30	**Pat Cummins**	(Australia)	8 May 1993 (aged 20)	Right-handed	Right-arm fast	Overseas
65	**Morne Morkel**	(South Africa)	6 October 1984 (aged 29)	Left-handed	Right-arm fast	Overseas
74	**Sunil Narine**	(Trinidad and Tobago)	26 May 1988 (aged 25)	Left-handed	Right-arm off break	Overseas
	Sayan Mondal	(India)	10 November 1989 (aged 24)	Left-handed	Right-arm medium-fast	
	Veer Pratap Singh	(India)	3 May 1992 (aged 21)	Right-handed	Right-arm medium-fast	
	Kuldeep Yadav	(India)	14 December 1994 (aged 19)	Left-handed	Slow left-arm chinaman	

== Indian Premier League ==
=== Season standings ===
Kolkata Knight Riders finished winners in the league stage of IPL 2014.

Pos	Team	Pld	W	L	NR	Pts	NRR
1	Kings XI Punjab (R)	14	11	3	0	22	0.968
2	Kolkata Knight Riders (C)	14	9	5	0	18	0.418
3	Chennai Super Kings (3)	14	9	5	0	18	0.385
4	Mumbai Indians (4)	14	7	7	0	14	0.095
5	Rajasthan Royals	14	7	7	0	14	0.060
6	Sunrisers Hyderabad	14	6	8	0	12	−0.399
7	Royal Challengers Bangalore	14	5	9	0	10	−0.428
8	Delhi Daredevils	14	2	12	0	4	−1.182

- Top 4 teams were qualified for the playoffs
- advanced to the Qualifier and 2014 Champions League Twenty20 Group Stage
- advanced to the Eliminator and 2014 Champions League Twenty20 Group Stage
- advanced to the Eliminator and 2014 Champions League Twenty20 Qualifying Stage

=== Match log ===
No.	Date	Opponent	Venue	Result	Scorecard
1	April 17, 2014	Mumbai Indians	Abu Dhabi	Won by 41 Runs, MoM - Jacques Kallis 72(46)	Score Card
2	April 19, 2014	Delhi Daredevils	Dubai	Lost by 4 Wickets	Score Card
3	April 24, 2014	Royal Challengers Bangalore	Sharjah	Won by 2 Runs, MoM - Chris Lynn 45(31)	Score Card
4	April 26, 2014	Kings XI Punjab	Abu Dhabi	Lost by 24 Runs	Score Card
5	April 29, 2014	Rajasthan Royals	Abu Dhabi	Match Tied; Super Over Tied; Lost by Boundary Count	Score Card
6	May 2, 2014	Chennai Super Kings	Ranchi	Lost by 35 Runs	Score Card
7	May 5, 2014	Rajasthan Royals	Ahmedabad	Lost by 10 Runs	Score Card
8	May 7, 2014	Delhi Daredevils	New Delhi	Won by 8 Wickets, MoM - Gautam Gambhir 69(56)	Score Card
9	May 11, 2014	Kings XI Punjab	Cuttack	Won by 9 Wickets, MoM - Gautam Gambhir 63(45)	Score Card
10	May 14, 2014	Mumbai Indians	Cuttack	Won by 6 Wickets, MoM - Robin Uthappa 80(52)	Score Card
11	May 18, 2014	Sunrisers Hyderabad	Hyderabad	Won by 7 Wickets, MoM - Umesh Yadav 3/26 (4 Overs)	Score Card
12	May 20, 2014	Chennai Super Kings	Kolkata	Won by 8 Wickets, MoM - Robin Uthappa 67(39)	Score Card
13	May 22, 2014	Royal Challengers Bangalore	Kolkata	Won by 30 Runs, MoM - Robin Uthappa 83(51)	Score Card
14	May 24, 2014	Sunrisers Hyderabad	Kolkata	Won by 4 Wickets, MoM - Yusuf Pathan 72(22)	Score Card
15	May 28, 2014	Kings XI Punjab (Qualifier 1)	Kolkata	Won by 28 Runs, MoM - Umesh Yadav 3/13 (4 Overs)	Score Card
16	June 1, 2014	Kings XI Punjab (Final)	Bangalore	Won by 3 Wickets, MoM – Manish Pandey 94(50)	Score Card
Overall record: 11–5. Champions. Qualified for 2014 Champions League Twenty20.

== Champions League Twenty20 ==
=== Match log ===
No.	Date	Opponent	Venue	Result	Scorecard
1	17 September	Chennai Super Kings	Hyderabad	Won by 3 wickets, MoM - Andre Russell 58 (25) and 0/12 (1 over)	Scorecard
2	21 September	Lahore Lions	Hyderabad	Won by 4 wickets, MoM - Sunil Narine 3/9 (4 overs)	Scorecard
3	24 September	Perth Scorchers	Hyderabad	Won by 3 wickets, MoM - Kuldeep Yadav 3/24 (4 overs), 1 catch	Scorecard
4	29 September	Dolphinss	Hyderabad	Won by 36 runs, MoM - Robin Uthappa 85 (55)	Scorecard
5	2 October (Semifinal)	Hobart Hurricanes	Hyderabad	Won by 7 wickets, MoM - Jacques Kallis 54* (40)	Scorecard
6	4 October (Final)	Chennai Super Kings	Bangalore	Lost By 8 Wickets	Scorecard
Overall record: 5–1. Runners-up.
