= 2014 Royal Challengers Bangalore season =

Indian Premier League cricket team season

Royal Challengers Bangalore
2014 season
- Coach: Daniel Vettori
- Captain: Virat Kohli
- Ground(s): M. Chinnaswamy Stadium, Bangalore
- League stage: 7th
- Most runs: AB de Villiers (395)
- Most wickets: Varun Aaron (16)

Royal Challengers Bangalore is a franchise cricket team based in Bangalore, India, which plays in the Indian Premier League. They were one of the eight teams that competed in the 2014 Indian Premier League. They were captained by Virat Kohli. Royal Challengers Bangalore finished seventh in the IPL and did not qualify for the Champions League T20.

== Squad ==
- Players with international caps before the 2014 IPL season are listed in **bold**.

No.	Name	Nationality	Birth date	Batting Style	Bowling Style	Notes
Batsmen
11	Rilee Rossouw	South Africa	9 October 1989 (aged 24)	Left-handed	Right-arm off break	Overseas
18	**Virat Kohli**	India	5 November 1988 (aged 25)	Right-handed	Right-arm medium	Captain
53	**Nic Maddinson**	Australia	21 December 1991 (aged 22)	Left-handed	Left-arm orthodox	Overseas
89	**Tanmay Mishra**	Kenya	22 December 1986 (aged 27)	Right-handed	Right-arm medium fast	
175	**Chris Gayle**	Jamaica	21 September 1979 (aged 34)	Left-handed	Right-arm off break	Overseas
451	Vijay Zol	India	23 November 1994 (aged 19)	Left-handed	Right-arm off break	
All-rounders
12	**Yuvraj Singh**	India	12 December 1981 (aged 32)	Left-handed	Left-arm orthodox	
69	Sachin Rana	India	18 September 1984 (aged 29)	Right-handed	Right-arm medium fast	
81	**Albie Morkel**	South Africa	10 June 1981 (aged 32)	Left-handed	Right-arm medium fast	Overseas
Wicket-keepers
5	Yogesh Takawale	India	5 December 1984 (aged 29)	Right-handed		
17	**AB de Villiers**	South Africa	17 February 1984 (aged 30)	Right-handed	Right-arm medium	Overseas
42	**Parthiv Patel**	India	9 March 1985 (aged 29)	Left-handed		
Bowlers
2	**Ashok Dinda**	India	25 March 1984 (aged 30)	Right-handed	Right-arm medium fast	
3	Yuzvendra Chahal	India	23 July 1990 (aged 23)	Right-handed	Right-arm leg break	
13	Harshal Patel	India	23 November 1990 (aged 23)	Right-handed	Right-arm medium	
14	**Ravi Rampaul**	Trinidad and Tobago	15 October 1984 (aged 29)	Left-handed	Right-arm medium fast	Overseas
23	Abu Nechim	India	5 November 1988 (aged 25)	Right-handed	Right-arm fast medium	
45	**Varun Aaron**	India	29 October 1989 (aged 24)	Right-handed	Right-arm fast medium	
56	**Mitchell Starc**	Australia	30 January 1990 (aged 24)	Left-handed	Left-arm fast	Overseas
800	**Muttiah Muralitharan**	Sri Lanka	17 April 1972 (aged 41)	Right-handed	Right-arm off break	Overseas
	Shadab Jakati	India	27 November 1980 (aged 33)	Right-handed	Left-arm orthodox	
	Sandeep Warrier	India	4 April 1991 (aged 23)	Right-handed	Right-arm fast medium	

== Indian Premier League season ==
=== Standings ===
Royal Challengers Bangalore finished seventh in the league stage of IPL 2014.

Pos	Team	Pld	W	L	NR	Pts	NRR
1	Kings XI Punjab (R)	14	11	3	0	22	0.968
2	Kolkata Knight Riders (C)	14	9	5	0	18	0.418
3	Chennai Super Kings (3)	14	9	5	0	18	0.385
4	Mumbai Indians (4)	14	7	7	0	14	0.095
5	Rajasthan Royals	14	7	7	0	14	0.060
6	Sunrisers Hyderabad	14	6	8	0	12	−0.399
7	Royal Challengers Bangalore	14	5	9	0	10	−0.428
8	Delhi Daredevils	14	2	12	0	4	−1.182

- Top 4 teams were qualified for the playoffs
- advanced to the Qualifier and 2014 Champions League Twenty20 Group Stage
- advanced to the Eliminator and 2014 Champions League Twenty20 Group Stage
- advanced to the Eliminator and 2014 Champions League Twenty20 Qualifying Stage

=== Match log ===
No.	Date	Opponent	Venue	Result	Scorecard
1	17 April 2014	Delhi Daredevils	Sharjah	Won by 8 wickets, MoM – Yuzvendra Chahal 1/18 (4 Overs)	Score Card
2	19 April 2014	Mumbai Indians	Dubai	Won by 7 wickets, MoM – Parthiv Patel 57* (45)	Score Card
3	24 April 2014	Kolkata Knight Riders	Sharjah	Lost by 2 runs	Score Card
4	26 April 2014	Rajasthan Royals	Abu Dhabi	Lost by 6 wickets	Score Card
5	28 April 2014	Kings XI Punjab	Dubai	Lost by 5 wickets	Score Card
6	4 May 2014	Sunrisers Hyderabad	Bengaluru	Won by 4 wickets, MoM – AB de Villiers 89* (41)	Score Card
7	6 May 2014	Mumbai Indians	Mumbai	Lost by 19 runs	Score Card
8	9 May 2014	Kings XI Punjab	Bengaluru	Lost by 33 runs	Score Card
9	11 May 2014	Rajasthan Royals	Bengaluru	Lost by 5 wickets	Score Card
10	13 May 2014	Delhi Daredevils	Bengaluru	Won by 16 runs, MoM – Yuvraj Singh 68* (29)	Score Card
11	18 May 2014	Chennai Super Kings	Ranchi	Won by 5 wickets, MoM – AB de Villiers 28 (14)	Score Card
12	20 May 2014	Sunrisers Hyderabad	Hyderabad	Lost by 7 wickets	Score Card
13	22 May 2014	Kolkata Knight Riders	Kolkata	Lost by 31 runs	Score Card
14	24 May 2014	Chennai Super Kings	Bengaluru	Lost by 8 wickets	Score Card
Overall record: 5–9. Failed to advance.
