= 2014 Kings XI Punjab season =

Indian Premier League cricket team season

Kings XI Punjab
2014 season
- Coach: Sanjay Bangar
- Captain: George Bailey
- Ground(s): PCA Stadium, Mohali
- IPL: Runners-up
- CLT20: Semi-final
- Most runs: Glenn Maxwell (552)
- Most wickets: Sandeep Sharma (18)

Kings XI Punjab (KXIP) is a franchise cricket team based in Mohali, India, which plays in the Indian Premier League (IPL). They were one of the eight teams that competed in the 2014 Indian Premier League. They were captained by George Bailey. Kings XI Punjab finished runners-up in the IPL and qualified for the Champions League T20 for the first time.

== Squad ==
- Players with international caps prior to the start of the 2014 season are listed in **bold**.

| No. | Name | Nat | Birth date | Batting Style | Bowling Style | Notes |
Batsmen
| 2 | **George Bailey** | (Australia) | 7 September 1982 (aged 31) | Right-handed | Right-arm medium | Captain; Overseas |
| 10 | **David Miller** | (South Africa) | 10 June 1989 (aged 24) | Left-handed | Right-arm off break | Overseas |
| 14 | **Shaun Marsh** | (Australia) | 9 July 1983 (aged 30) | Left-handed | Slow left-arm orthodox | Overseas |
| 17 | Mandeep Singh | (India) | 18 December 1991 (aged 22) | Right-handed | Right-arm medium | |
| 18 | **Virender Sehwag** | (India) | 20 October 1978 (aged 35) | Right-handed | Right-arm off break | |
| 22 | Gurkeerat Singh | (India) | 29 June 1990 (aged 23) | Right-handed | Right-arm off break | Occasional wicketkeeper |
| 54 | Manan Vohra | (India) | 18 July 1993 (aged 20) | Right-handed | Right-arm medium | |
| 266 | **Cheteshwar Pujara** | (India) | 25 January 1988 (aged 26) | Right-handed | Right-arm leg break | |
All-rounders
| 1 | **Thisara Perera** | (Sri Lanka) | 3 April 1989 (aged 25) | Left-handed | Right-arm medium-fast | Overseas |
| 19 | Rishi Dhawan | (India) | 19 February 1990 (aged 24) | Right-handed | Right-arm medium-fast | |
| 20 | Akshar Patel | (India) | 20 January 1994 (aged 20) | Left-handed | Slow left-arm orthodox | |
| 32 | **Glenn Maxwell** | (Australia) | 14 October 1988 (aged 25) | Right-handed | Right-arm off break | Overseas |
| 45 | Shivam Sharma | (India) | 9 September 1993 (aged 20) | Right-handed | Right-arm off-break | |
Wicket-keepers
| 6 | **Wriddhiman Saha** | (India) | 24 October 1984 (aged 29) | Right-handed | | |
Bowlers
| 11 | **Murali Kartik** | (India) | 11 September 1976 (aged 37) | Left-handed | Slow left-arm orthodox | |
| 22 | Karanveer Singh | (India) | 8 November 1987 (aged 26) | Right-handed | Right-arm leg break googly | |
| 25 | **Mitchell Johnson** | (Australia) | 2 November 1981 (aged 32) | Left-handed | Left-arm fast | Overseas |
| 34 | **Parvinder Awana** | (India) | 19 June 1986 (aged 27) | Right-handed | Right-arm medium-fast | |
| 55 | **Lakshmipathy Balaji** | (India) | 27 September 1981 (aged 32) | Right-handed | Right-arm medium-fast | |
| 66 | Sandeep Sharma | (India) | 18 May 1993 (aged 20) | Right-handed | Right-arm medium-fast | |
| 88 | Anureet Singh | (India) | 2 March 1988 (aged 26) | Right-handed | Right-arm medium-fast | |
| | **Beuran Hendricks** | (South Africa) | 8 June 1990 (aged 23) | Right-handed | Left-arm medium-fast | Overseas |
| | Shardul Thakur | (India) | 16 October 1991 (aged 22) | Right-handed | Right-arm medium-fast | |

== Indian Premier League ==
=== Season standings ===
Kings XI Punjab finished first in the league stage of IPL 2014.

| Pos | Team | Pld | W | L | NR | Pts | NRR |
|---|---|---|---|---|---|---|---|
| 1 | Kings XI Punjab (R) | 14 | 11 | 3 | 0 | 22 | 0.968 |
| 2 | Kolkata Knight Riders (C) | 14 | 9 | 5 | 0 | 18 | 0.418 |
| 3 | Chennai Super Kings (3) | 14 | 9 | 5 | 0 | 18 | 0.385 |
| 4 | Mumbai Indians (4) | 14 | 7 | 7 | 0 | 14 | 0.095 |
| 5 | Rajasthan Royals | 14 | 7 | 7 | 0 | 14 | 0.060 |
| 6 | Sunrisers Hyderabad | 14 | 6 | 8 | 0 | 12 | −0.399 |
| 7 | Royal Challengers Bangalore | 14 | 5 | 9 | 0 | 10 | −0.428 |
| 8 | Delhi Daredevils | 14 | 2 | 12 | 0 | 4 | −1.182 |

- Top 4 teams were qualified for the playoffs
- advanced to the Qualifier and 2014 Champions League Twenty20 Group Stage
- advanced to the Eliminator and 2014 Champions League Twenty20 Group Stage
- advanced to the Eliminator and 2014 Champions League Twenty20 Qualifying Stage

=== Match log ===
| No. | Date | Opponent | Venue | Result | Scorecard |
|---|---|---|---|---|---|
| 1 | April 18, 2014 | Chennai Super Kings | Abu Dhabi | Won by 6 wickets MoM – Glenn Maxwell 95 (43) | Score Board |
| 2 | April 20, 2014 | Rajasthan Royals | Sharjah | Won by 7 wickets MoM – Glenn Maxwell 89 (45) | Score Board |
| 3 | April 22, 2014 | Sunrisers Hyderabad | Sharjah | Won by 72 runs MoM – Glenn Maxwell 95 (43) | Score Board |
| 4 | April 26, 2014 | Kolkata Knight Riders | Abu Dhabi | Won by 23 runs MoM – Sandeep Sharma 3/21 (4 Overs) | Score Board |
| 5 | April 28, 2014 | Royal Challengers Bangalore | Dubai | Won by 5 wickets MoM – Sandeep Sharma 3/15 (3 Overs) | Score Board |
| 6 | May 3, 2014 | Mumbai Indians | Mumbai | Lost by 5 wickets | Score Board |
| 7 | May 7, 2014 | Chennai Super Kings | Cuttack | Won by 44 runs MoM – Glenn Maxwell 90 (38) & 1/21 (2 Overs) | Score Board |
| 8 | May 9, 2014 | Royal Challengers Bangalore | Bengaluru | Won by 32 runs MoM – Sandeep Sharma 3/25 (4 Overs) | Score Board |
| 9 | May 11, 2014 | Kolkata Knight Riders | Cuttack | Lost by 9 wickets | Score Board |
| 10 | May 14, 2014 | Sunrisers Hyderabad | Hyderabad | Won by 6 wickets MoM – Wriddhiman Saha 54(26) | Score Board |
| 11 | May 19, 2014 | Delhi Daredevils | Delhi | Won by 4 wickets MoM – Akshar Patel 42(35) & 1/18(4 Overs) | Score Board |
| 12 | May 21, 2014 | Mumbai Indians | Mohali | Lost by 7 wickets | Score Board |
| 13 | May 23, 2014 | Rajasthan Royals | Mohali | Won by 16 runs MoM – Shaun Marsh 40(35) | Score Board |
| 14 | May 25, 2014 | Delhi Daredevils | Mohali | Won by 7 wickets MoM – Manan Vohra 47(38) | Score Board |
| 15 | May 28, 2014 | Kolkata Knight Riders (Qualifier 1) | Kolkata | Lost by 28 runs | Score Board |
| 16 | May 30, 2014 | Chennai Super Kings (Qualifier 2) | Mumbai | Won by 24 runs MoM – Virender Sehwag 122(58) | Score Board |
| 17 | June 1, 2014 | Kolkata Knight Riders (Final) | Bengaluru | Lost by 3 wickets | Score Board |
Overall record: 12–5. Runners-up.

== Champions League Twenty20 ==
=== Match log ===
| No. | Date | Opponent | Venue | Result |
|---|---|---|---|---|
| 1 | 18 September | Hobart Hurricanes | Mohali | Won by 5 wickets, MOM - Thisara Perera 2/17 (3 overs), 35* (20) |
| 2 | 20 September | Barbados Tridents | Mohali | Won by 5 wickets, MOM - David Miller 46* (34), 2 catches |
| 3 | 26 September | Northern Knights | Mohali | Won by 120 runs, MOM - Manan Vohra 65(32) |
| 4 | 28 September | Cape Cobras | Mohali | Won by 7 wickets, MoM – Akshar Patel 3/15 (4 overs) |
| 5 | 2 October | Chennai Super Kings | Hyderabad | Lost by 65 runs |
Overall record: 4–1. Semi-finalists.
