= 2014 Sunrisers Hyderabad season =

Indian Premier League cricket team season

Sunrisers Hyderabad
2014 season
- Coach: Tom Moody
- Captain: Shikhar Dhawan (10); Darren Sammy (4)
- Ground(s): Rajiv Gandhi International Cricket Stadium, Hyderabad (Capacity: 55,000)
- IPL: Group Stage (6th)
- Most runs: David Warner (528)
- Most wickets: Bhuvneshwar Kumar (20)
- Most catches: David Warner (8)
- Most wicket-keeping dismissals: Naman Ojha (7)

Sunrisers Hyderabad (SRH) are a franchise cricket team based in Hyderabad, India, which plays in the Indian Premier League (IPL). They were one of the eight teams competing in the 2014 Indian Premier League. This was their second outing in the IPL. The team was being captained by Shikhar Dhawan but later replaced by Darren Sammy. The team was coached by Tom Moody with Waqar Younis as their bowling coach, VVS Laxman and Kris Srikkanth as the mentors for this team.

The Sunrisers started their campaign against Rajasthan Royals on 18 April 2014 at Abu Dhabi on a losing note and failed to qualify for the Play-Offs finishing 6th at the end of the tournament.

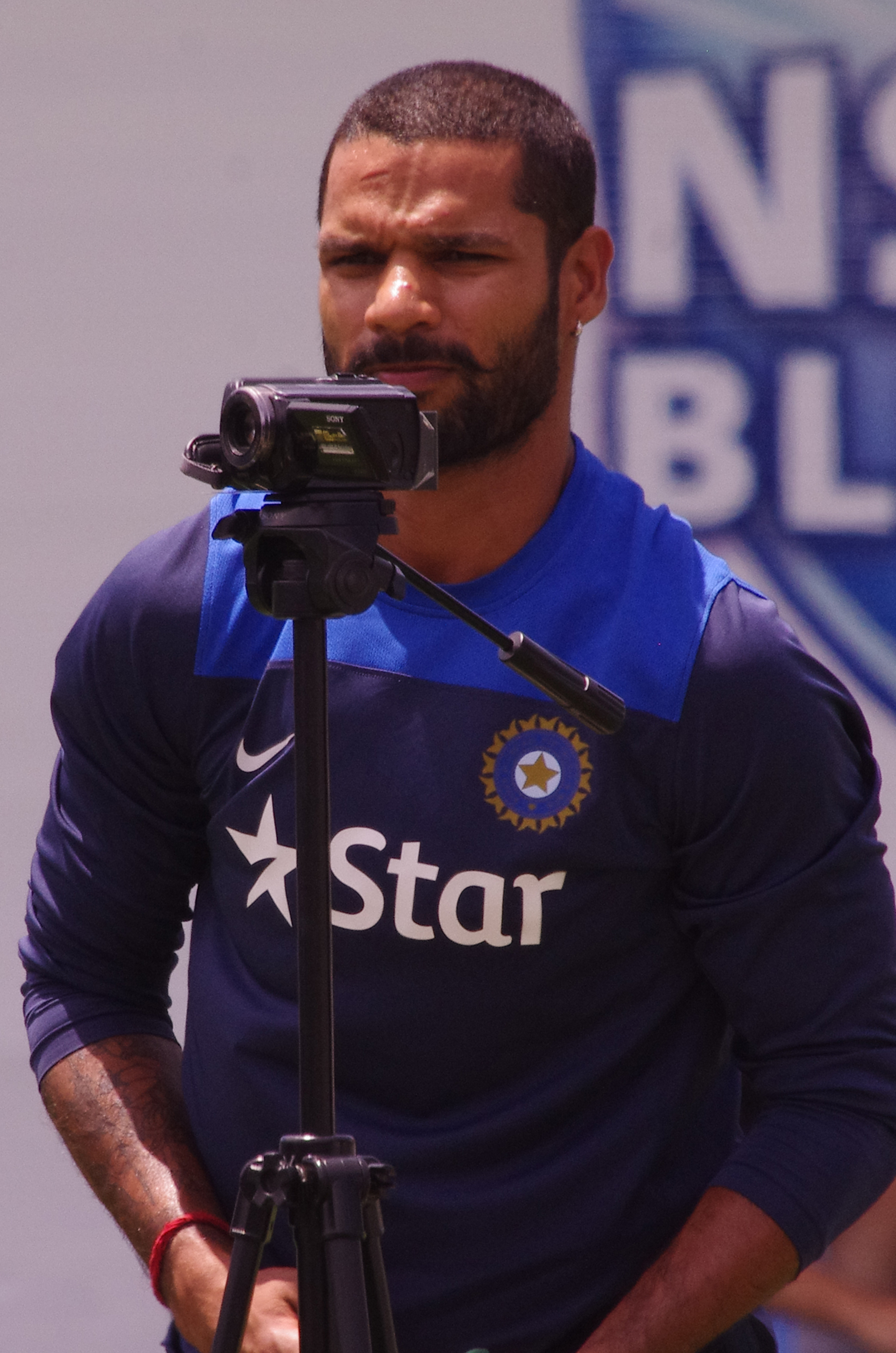
Shikhar Dhawan

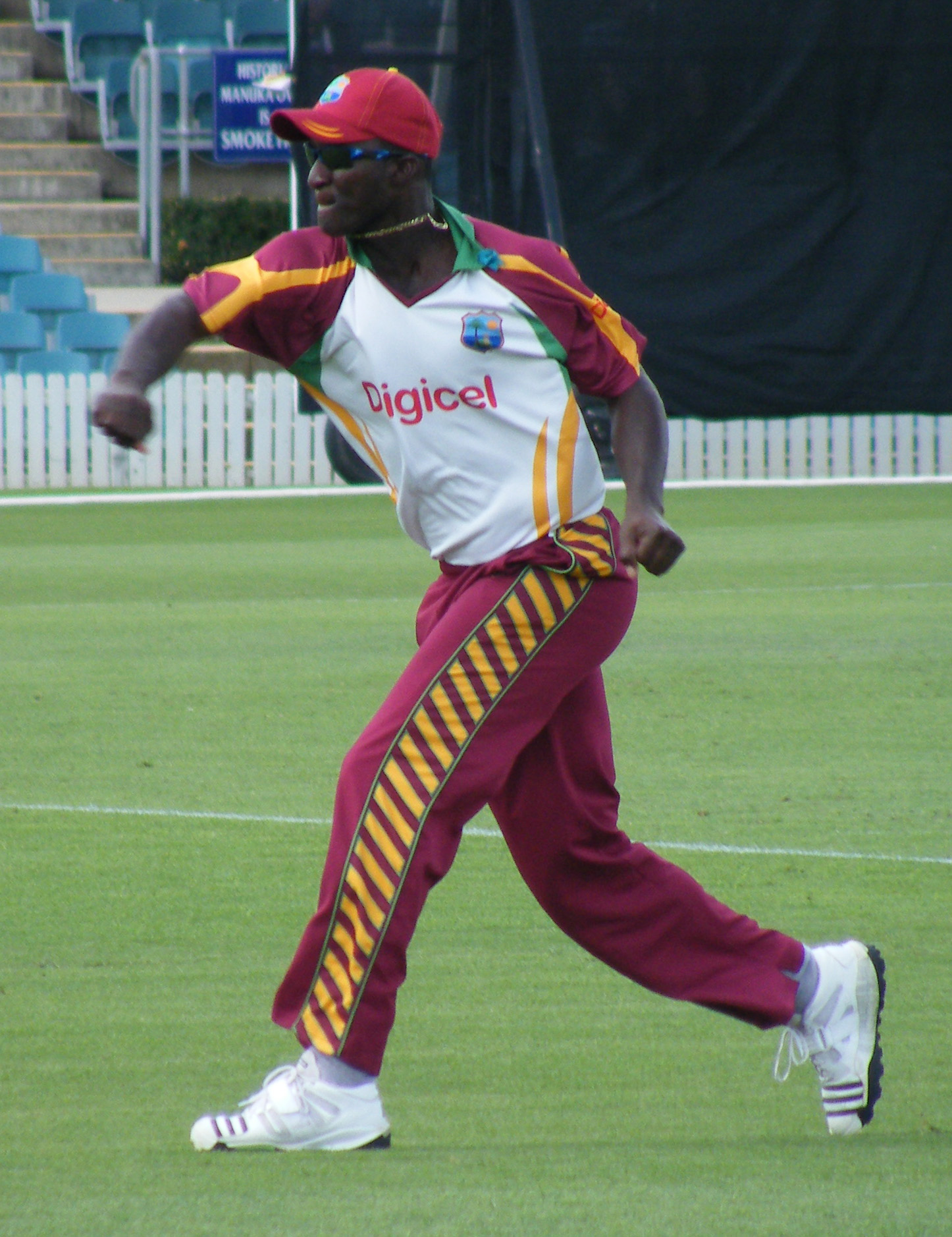
Darren Sammy

== Background ==
Due to the 2014 Lok Sabha Elections the season was partially held outside India with the opening 20 IPL matches which included 5 SRH matches in the UAE with the remaining matches played in India from May 2 onwards.

== Administration and support staff ==
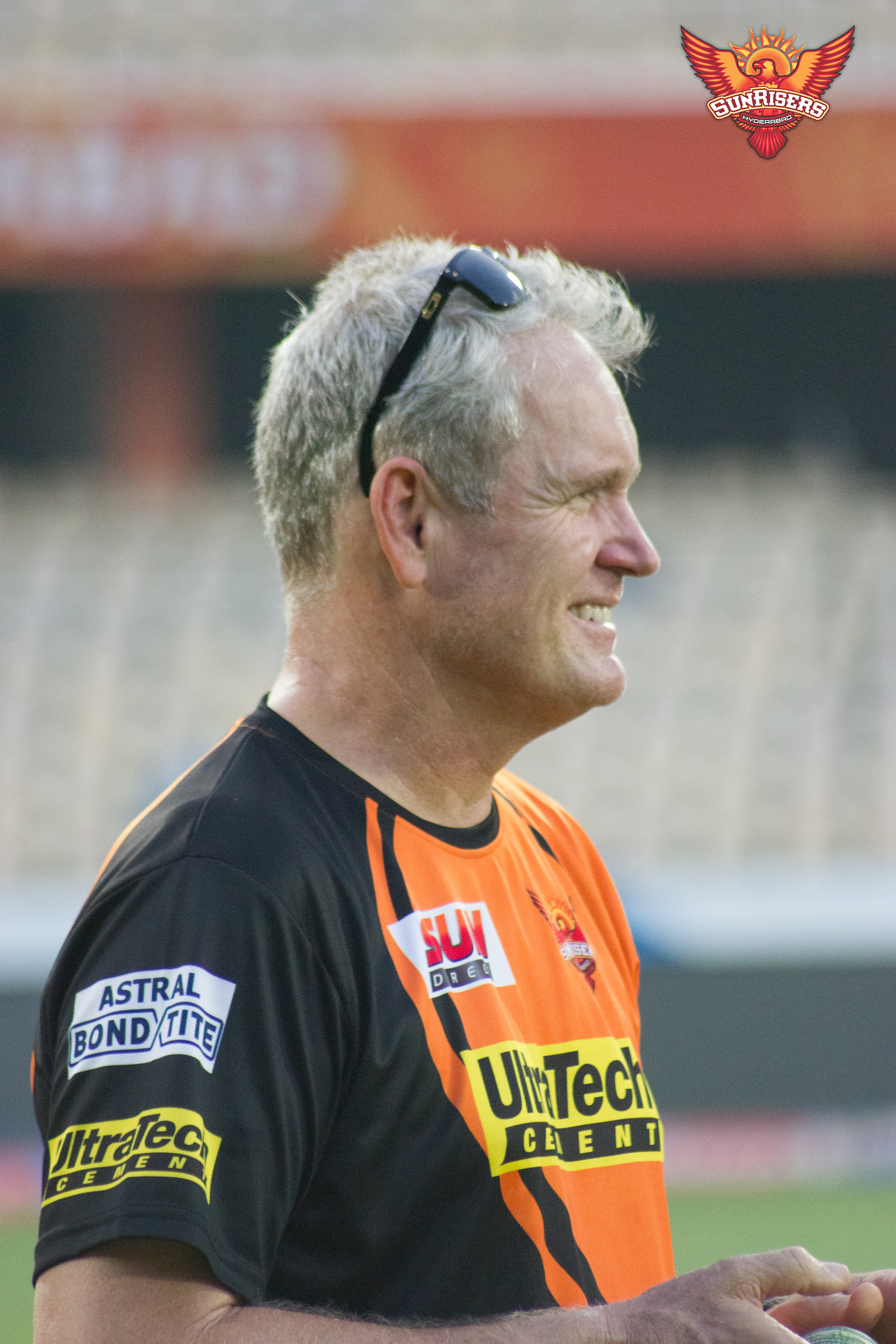
Tom Moody

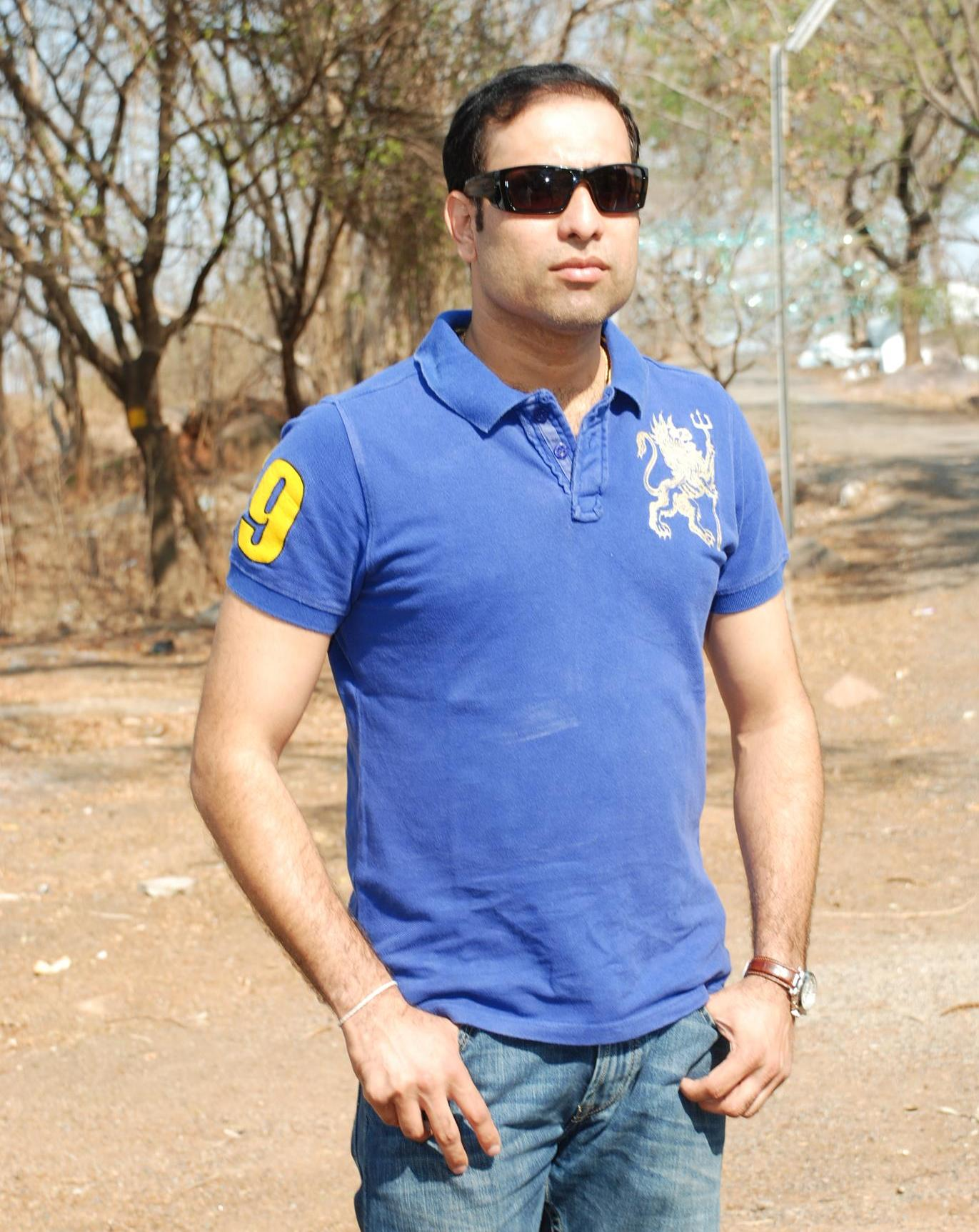
VVS Laxman

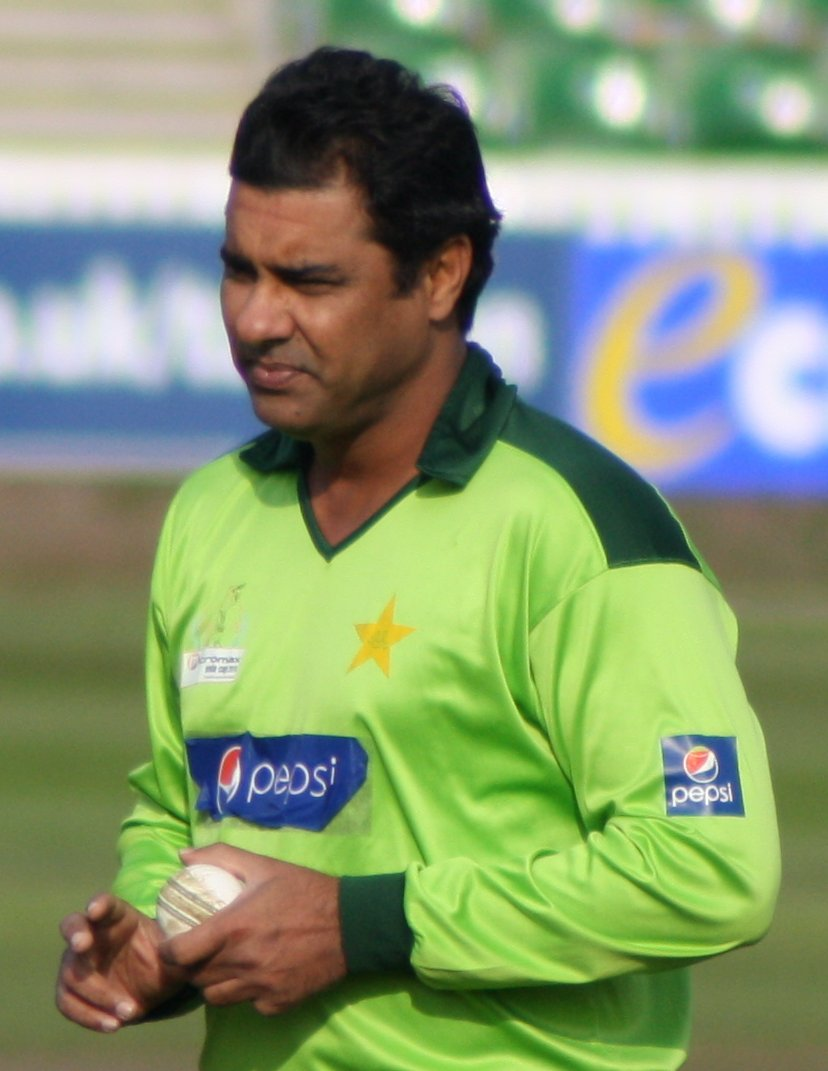
Waqar Younis

- Owner – Kalanithi Maran (Sun Network)
- Head coach – Tom Moody
- Assistant coach – Simon Helmot
- Bowling coach – Waqar Younis
- Mentor – VVS Laxman & Kris Srikkanth
Source :

== Kit manufacturers and sponsors ==
| Kit Manufacturers | Shirt Sponsor (Chest) | Shirt Sponsor (Back) | Chest Branding |
|---|---|---|---|
| TYKA | WHSmith | SpiceJet | Red FM 93.5 |

Source :

== Players auction ==
The players auction for the 2014 Indian Premier League held on 12 and 13 February 2014. All eight franchises had participated in the auction. SRH has retained 2 players and released 11 players from the previous season. As a result of this retention the team had an auction purse of Rs 380 million and 2 Right To Match(RTM) cards. Added 22 players to the team. They used two RTM card to bring Amit Mishra and Darren Sammy back into the team.

Retained Players: Shikhar Dhawan, Dale Steyn

Released Players: Kumar Sangakkara, Anand Rajan, Ankit Sharma, Ashish Reddy, Quinton de Kock, Jean-Paul Duminy, Chris Lynn, Nathan McCullum, Clint McKay, Amit Mishra, Parthiv Patel, Thisara Perera, Padmanabhan Prasanth, Veer Pratap Singh, Sachin Rana, Dwaraka Ravi Teja, Akshath Reddy, Biplab Samantray, Darren Sammy, Ishant Sharma, Karn Sharma, Thalaivan Sargunam, Sudeep Tyagi, Hanuma Vihari, Cameron White

Added Players: David Warner, Darren Sammy, Amit Mishra, Irfan Pathan, Ishant Sharma, Bhuvneshwar Kumar, Brendan Taylor, Moisés Henriques, Venugopal Rao, Jason Holder, Aaron Finch, Srikkanth Anirudha, Manpreet Juneja, K. L. Rahul, Parvez Rasool, Prasanth Parameswaran, Karn Sharma, Amit Paunikar, Naman Ojha, Ricky Bhui, Ashish Reddy, Chama Milind

== Squad ==
- Players with international caps are listed in **bold**.
- **Signed Year** denotes year from which player is associated with Sunrisers Hyderabad

| Name | Nationality | Birth date | Batting style | Bowling style | Year signed | Notes |
Batsmen
| Srikkanth Anirudha | India | 14 April 1987 (aged 27) | Right-handed | | 2014 | |
| Ricky Bhui | India | 29 November 1996 (aged 17) | Right-handed | Right-arm leg break | 2014 | |
| **Shikhar Dhawan** | India | 5 December 1985 (aged 28) | Left-handed | Right-arm off break | 2013 | Captain. |
| **Aaron Finch** | Australia | 17 November 1986 (aged 27) | Right-handed | Slow left-arm orthodox | 2014 | Overseas. |
| Manprit Juneja | India | 12 September 1990 (aged 23) | Right-handed | Right-arm off break | 2014 | |
| **Venugopal Rao** | India | 26 February 1982 (aged 32) | Right-handed | Right-arm off break | 2014 | |
| **David Warner** | Australia | 27 October 1986 (aged 27) | Left-handed | Right-arm leg break | 2014 | Overseas. |
All-rounders
| **Moisés Henriques** | Australia | 1 February 1987 (aged 27) | Right-handed | Right-arm medium-fast | 2014 | Overseas. |
| **Jason Holder** | West Indies | 5 November 1991 (aged 22) | Right-handed | Right-arm medium | 2014 | Overseas. |
| **Irfan Pathan** | India | 27 October 1984 (aged 29) | Left-handed | Left-arm medium | 2014 | |
| **Parvez Rasool** | India | 13 February 1989 (aged 25) | Right-handed | Right-arm off break | 2014 | |
| Ashish Reddy | India | 24 February 1991 (aged 23) | Right-handed | Right-arm medium | 2013 | |
| **Darren Sammy** | West Indies | 20 December 1983 (aged 30) | Right-handed | Right-arm medium | 2013 | Overseas. |
Wicket-keepers
| **Naman Ojha** | India | 20 July 1983 (aged 30) | Right-handed | Right-arm medium | 2014 | |
| Amit Paunikar | India | 18 April 1988 (aged 25) | Right-handed | Right-arm Wicket keeper | 2014 | |
| K. L. Rahul | India | 18 April 1992 (aged 21) | Right-handed | Right-arm medium | 2014 | |
| **Brendan Taylor** | Zimbabwe | 6 February 1986 (aged 28) | Right-handed | Right-arm off break | 2014 | Overseas. |
Bowlers
| **Bhuvneshwar Kumar** | India | 5 February 1990 (aged 24) | Right-handed | Right-arm medium-fast | 2014 | |
| Chama Milind | India | 4 September 1994 (aged 19) | Left-handed | Left-arm medium-fast | 2014 | |
| **Amit Mishra** | India | 24 November 1982 (aged 31) | Right-handed | Right-arm leg break | 2013 | |
| Prasanth Parameswaran | India | 22 May 1985 (aged 28) | Right-handed | Left-arm medium-fast | 2014 | |
| **Ishant Sharma** | India | 2 September 1988 (aged 25) | Right-handed | Right-arm medium-fast | 2013 | |
| Karn Sharma | India | 23 October 1987 (aged 26) | Left-handed | Right-arm leg break | 2013 | |
| **Dale Steyn** | South Africa | 27 June 1983 (aged 30) | Right-handed | Right-arm fast | 2013 | Overseas. |

== Season overview ==
=== Standings ===
| Pos | Team | Pld | W | L | NR | Pts | NRR |
|---|---|---|---|---|---|---|---|
| 1 | Kings XI Punjab (R) | 14 | 11 | 3 | 0 | 22 | 0.968 |
| 2 | Kolkata Knight Riders (C) | 14 | 9 | 5 | 0 | 18 | 0.418 |
| 3 | Chennai Super Kings (3) | 14 | 9 | 5 | 0 | 18 | 0.385 |
| 4 | Mumbai Indians (4) | 14 | 7 | 7 | 0 | 14 | 0.095 |
| 5 | Rajasthan Royals | 14 | 7 | 7 | 0 | 14 | 0.060 |
| 6 | Sunrisers Hyderabad | 14 | 6 | 8 | 0 | 12 | −0.399 |
| 7 | Royal Challengers Bangalore | 14 | 5 | 9 | 0 | 10 | −0.428 |
| 8 | Delhi Daredevils | 14 | 2 | 12 | 0 | 4 | −1.182 |

- Top 4 teams were qualified for the playoffs
- advanced to the Qualifier and 2014 Champions League Twenty20 Group Stage
- advanced to the Eliminator and 2014 Champions League Twenty20 Group Stage
- advanced to the Eliminator and 2014 Champions League Twenty20 Qualifying Stage

=== Results by match ===
| Round | 1 | 2 | 3 | 4 | 5 | 6 | 7 | 8 | 9 | 10 | 11 | 12 | 13 | 14 |
|---|---|---|---|---|---|---|---|---|---|---|---|---|---|---|
| Ground | H | A | H | H | A | A | A | A | H | H | H | H | A | A |
| Result | L | L | W | L | W | L | W | W | L | L | L | W | W | L |

Source: Fixtures
A = Away; H = Home; W = Win; D = Draw; L = Loss

== Fixtures ==
=== League stage ===
| 18 April | (H) Sunrisers Hyderabad; 133/6 (20 overs) | v | Rajasthan Royals; 135/6 (19.3 overs) | Rajasthan Royals won by 4 wickets |
| 20:00 (D/N); Scorecard | (H) Sunrisers Hyderabad; 133/6 (20 overs) | v | Rajasthan Royals; 135/6 (19.3 overs) | Sheikh Zayed Stadium, Abu Dhabi; Umpires: Billy Bowden (NZ) and Richard Illingworth (Eng); Player of the match: Ajinkya Rahane (RR) |
| 20:00 (D/N); Scorecard | Shikhar Dhawan 38 (34); Rajat Bhatia 2/22 (4 overs) | | Ajinkya Rahane 59 (53); Amit Mishra 2/26 (4 overs) | Sheikh Zayed Stadium, Abu Dhabi; Umpires: Billy Bowden (NZ) and Richard Illingworth (Eng); Player of the match: Ajinkya Rahane (RR) |
| Rajasthan Royals won the toss and chose to field | | | | Sheikh Zayed Stadium, Abu Dhabi; Umpires: Billy Bowden (NZ) and Richard Illingworth (Eng); Player of the match: Ajinkya Rahane (RR) |

| 22 April | (H) Kings XI Punjab; 193/6 (20 overs) | v | Sunrisers Hyderabad; 121 (19.2 overs) | Kings XI Punjab won by 72 runs |
| 20:00 (D/N); Scorecard | (H) Kings XI Punjab; 193/6 (20 overs) | v | Sunrisers Hyderabad; 121 (19.2 overs) | Sharjah Cricket Stadium; Umpires: Marais Erasmus (SA) and S Ravi (Ind); Player of the match: Glenn Maxwell (KXIP) |
| 20:00 (D/N); Scorecard | Glenn Maxwell 95 (43); Bhuvneshwar Kumar 3/19 (4 overs) | | Lokesh Rahul 27 (27); Lakshmipathy Balaji 4/13 (4 overs) | Sharjah Cricket Stadium; Umpires: Marais Erasmus (SA) and S Ravi (Ind); Player of the match: Glenn Maxwell (KXIP) |
| Sunrisers Hyderabad won the toss and elected to field | | | | Sharjah Cricket Stadium; Umpires: Marais Erasmus (SA) and S Ravi (Ind); Player of the match: Glenn Maxwell (KXIP) |

| 25 April | (H) Sunrisers Hyderabad; 184/1 (20 overs) | v | Delhi Daredevils; 180/4 (20 overs) | Sunrisers Hyderabad won by 4 runs |
| 16:00; Scorecard | (H) Sunrisers Hyderabad; 184/1 (20 overs) | v | Delhi Daredevils; 180/4 (20 overs) | Dubai International Cricket Stadium; Umpires: Marais Erasmus (SA) and S Ravi (Ind); Player of the match: Aaron Finch (SRH) |
| 16:00; Scorecard | Aaron Finch 88* (53); Shahbaz Nadeem 1/24 (4 overs) | | Murali Vijay 52 (40); Dale Steyn 2/33 (4 overs) | Dubai International Cricket Stadium; Umpires: Marais Erasmus (SA) and S Ravi (Ind); Player of the match: Aaron Finch (SRH) |
| Sunrisers Hyderabad won the toss and chose to bat | | | | Dubai International Cricket Stadium; Umpires: Marais Erasmus (SA) and S Ravi (Ind); Player of the match: Aaron Finch (SRH) |

| 27 April | (H) Sunrisers Hyderabad; 145/5 (20 overs) | v | Chennai Super Kings; 146/5 (19.3 overs) | Chennai Super Kings won by 5 wickets |
| 20:00 (D/N); Scorecard | (H) Sunrisers Hyderabad; 145/5 (20 overs) | v | Chennai Super Kings; 146/5 (19.3 overs) | Sharjah Cricket Stadium; Umpires: Anil Chaudhary (Ind) and Vineet Kulkarni (Ind); Player of the match: Dwayne Smith (CSK) |
| 20:00 (D/N); Scorecard | Aaron Finch 44 (45); Mohit Sharma 2/27 (4 overs) | | Dwayne Smith 66 (46); Bhuvneshwar Kumar 2/23 (4 overs) | Sharjah Cricket Stadium; Umpires: Anil Chaudhary (Ind) and Vineet Kulkarni (Ind); Player of the match: Dwayne Smith (CSK) |
| Sunrisers Hyderabad won the toss and elected to bat. | | | | Sharjah Cricket Stadium; Umpires: Anil Chaudhary (Ind) and Vineet Kulkarni (Ind); Player of the match: Dwayne Smith (CSK) |

| 30 April | Sunrisers Hyderabad; 172/5 (20 overs) | v | Mumbai Indians (H); 157/7 (20 overs) | Sunrisers Hyderabad won by 15 runs |
| 20:00 (D/N); Scorecard | Sunrisers Hyderabad; 172/5 (20 overs) | v | Mumbai Indians (H); 157/7 (20 overs) | Dubai International Cricket Stadium; Umpires: Kumar Dharmasena (SL) and Marais Erasmus (SA); Player of the match: Bhuvneshwar Kumar (SRH) |
| 20:00 (D/N); Scorecard | David Warner 65 (51); Zaheer Khan 2/26 (4 overs) | | Kieron Pollard 78 (48); Bhuvneshwar Kumar 2/17 (4 overs) | Dubai International Cricket Stadium; Umpires: Kumar Dharmasena (SL) and Marais Erasmus (SA); Player of the match: Bhuvneshwar Kumar (SRH) |
| Mumbai Indians won the toss and elected to field | | | | Dubai International Cricket Stadium; Umpires: Kumar Dharmasena (SL) and Marais Erasmus (SA); Player of the match: Bhuvneshwar Kumar (SRH) |

| 4 May | Sunrisers Hyderabad; 155/6 (20 overs) | v | Royal Challengers Bangalore (H); 158/6 (19.5 overs) | Royal Challengers Bangalore won by 4 wickets |
| 20:00 (D/N); Scorecard | Sunrisers Hyderabad; 155/6 (20 overs) | v | Royal Challengers Bangalore (H); 158/6 (19.5 overs) | M Chinnaswamy Stadium, Bangalore; Umpires: Kumar Dharmasena (SL) and Vineet Kulkarni (Ind); Player of the match: AB de Villiers (RCB) |
| 20:00 (D/N); Scorecard | David Warner 61 (49); Mitchell Starc 2/21 (4 overs) | | AB de Villiers 89* (41); Karn Sharma 3/17 (4 overs) | M Chinnaswamy Stadium, Bangalore; Umpires: Kumar Dharmasena (SL) and Vineet Kulkarni (Ind); Player of the match: AB de Villiers (RCB) |
| Royal Challengers Bangalore won the toss and elected to field | | | | M Chinnaswamy Stadium, Bangalore; Umpires: Kumar Dharmasena (SL) and Vineet Kulkarni (Ind); Player of the match: AB de Villiers (RCB) |

| 8 May | Sunrisers Hyderabad; 134/9 (20 overs) | v | Rajasthan Royals (H); 102 (19.5 overs) | Sunrisers Hyderabad won by 32 runs |
| 20:00 (D/N); Scorecard | Sunrisers Hyderabad; 134/9 (20 overs) | v | Rajasthan Royals (H); 102 (19.5 overs) | Sardar Patel Stadium, Motera, Ahmedabad; Umpires: Anil Chaudhary (Ind) and Nigel Llong (Eng); Player of the match: Bhuvneshwar Kumar (SRH) |
| 20:00 (D/N); Scorecard | Shikhar Dhawan 33 (20); Shane Watson 3/13 (2 overs) | | Steve Smith 22 (33); Bhuvneshwar Kumar 4/14 (4 overs) | Sardar Patel Stadium, Motera, Ahmedabad; Umpires: Anil Chaudhary (Ind) and Nigel Llong (Eng); Player of the match: Bhuvneshwar Kumar (SRH) |
| Rajasthan Royals won the toss and elected to field; Shane Watson took the thirteenth IPL hat-trick, the second of 2014 | | | | Sardar Patel Stadium, Motera, Ahmedabad; Umpires: Anil Chaudhary (Ind) and Nigel Llong (Eng); Player of the match: Bhuvneshwar Kumar (SRH) |

| 10 May | (H) Delhi Daredevils; 143/7 (20 overs) | v | Sunrisers Hyderabad; 44/2 (4.2 overs) | Sunrisers Hyderabad won by 8 wickets (D/L method) |
| 16:00 (D/N); Scorecard | (H) Delhi Daredevils; 143/7 (20 overs) | v | Sunrisers Hyderabad; 44/2 (4.2 overs) | Feroz Shah Kotla, Delhi; Umpires: Rajesh Deshpande (Ind) and Bruce Oxenford (Aus); Player of the match: Dale Steyn (SRH) |
| 16:00 (D/N); Scorecard | Dinesh Karthik 39 (30); Dale Steyn 2/20 (4 overs) | | Naman Ojha 13* (3); Siddarth Kaul 1/5 (1 over) | Feroz Shah Kotla, Delhi; Umpires: Rajesh Deshpande (Ind) and Bruce Oxenford (Aus); Player of the match: Dale Steyn (SRH) |
| Sunrisers Hyderabad won the toss and elected to field; Due to rain Hyderabad's target was adjusted to 43 runs from 5 overs via Duckworth–Lewis method; Amit Mishra became the second player to take 100 wickets in IPL | | | | Feroz Shah Kotla, Delhi; Umpires: Rajesh Deshpande (Ind) and Bruce Oxenford (Aus); Player of the match: Dale Steyn (SRH) |

| 12 May | (H) Sunrisers Hyderabad; 157/3 (20 overs) | v | Mumbai Indians; 160/3 (18.4 overs) | Mumbai Indians won by 7 wickets |
| 20:00 (D/N); Scorecard | (H) Sunrisers Hyderabad; 157/3 (20 overs) | v | Mumbai Indians; 160/3 (18.4 overs) | Rajiv Gandhi International Stadium, Uppal, Hyderabad; Umpires: Kumar Dharmasena (SL) and Vineet Kulkarni (Ind); Player of the match: Ambati Rayudu (MI) |
| 20:00 (D/N); Scorecard | Aaron Finch 68 (62); Lasith Malinga 2/35 (4 overs) | | Ambati Rayudu 68 (46); Bhuvneshwar Kumar 2/21 (4 overs) | Rajiv Gandhi International Stadium, Uppal, Hyderabad; Umpires: Kumar Dharmasena (SL) and Vineet Kulkarni (Ind); Player of the match: Ambati Rayudu (MI) |
| Sunrisers Hyderabad won the toss and elected to bat | | | | Rajiv Gandhi International Stadium, Uppal, Hyderabad; Umpires: Kumar Dharmasena (SL) and Vineet Kulkarni (Ind); Player of the match: Ambati Rayudu (MI) |

| 14 May | (H) Sunrisers Hyderabad; 205/5 (20 overs) | v | Kings XI Punjab; 211/4 (18.4 overs) | Kings XI Punjab won by 6 wickets |
| 16:00 (D/N); Scorecard | (H) Sunrisers Hyderabad; 205/5 (20 overs) | v | Kings XI Punjab; 211/4 (18.4 overs) | Rajiv Gandhi International Stadium, Uppal, Hyderabad; Umpires: Vineet Kulkarni (Ind) and Paschim Pathak (Ind); Player of the match: Wriddhiman Saha (KXIP) |
| 16:00 (D/N); Scorecard | Naman Ojha 79* (36); Rishi Dhawan 2/42 (4 overs) | | Wriddhiman Saha 54 (26); Amit Mishra 1/32 (4 overs) | Rajiv Gandhi International Stadium, Uppal, Hyderabad; Umpires: Vineet Kulkarni (Ind) and Paschim Pathak (Ind); Player of the match: Wriddhiman Saha (KXIP) |
| Kings XI Punjab won the toss and elected to field | | | | Rajiv Gandhi International Stadium, Uppal, Hyderabad; Umpires: Vineet Kulkarni (Ind) and Paschim Pathak (Ind); Player of the match: Wriddhiman Saha (KXIP) |

| 18 May | (H) Sunrisers Hyderabad; 142/8 (20 overs) | v | Kolkata Knight Riders; 146/3 (19.4 overs) | Kolkata Knight Riders won by 7 wickets |
| 20:00 (D/N); Scorecard | (H) Sunrisers Hyderabad; 142/8 (20 overs) | v | Kolkata Knight Riders; 146/3 (19.4 overs) | Rajiv Gandhi International Stadium, Uppal, Hyderabad; Umpires: Nigel Llong (Eng) and CK Nandan (Ind); Player of the match: Umesh Yadav (KKR) |
| 20:00 (D/N); Scorecard | David Warner 34 (18); Umesh Yadav 3/26 (4 overs) | | Robin Uthappa 40 (33); Karn Sharma 1/19 (4 overs) | Rajiv Gandhi International Stadium, Uppal, Hyderabad; Umpires: Nigel Llong (Eng) and CK Nandan (Ind); Player of the match: Umesh Yadav (KKR) |
| Sunrisers Hyderabad won the toss and elected to bat | | | | Rajiv Gandhi International Stadium, Uppal, Hyderabad; Umpires: Nigel Llong (Eng) and CK Nandan (Ind); Player of the match: Umesh Yadav (KKR) |

| 20 May | Royal Challengers Bangalore; 160/6 (20 overs) | v | Sunrisers Hyderabad (H); 161/3 (19.4 overs) | Sunrisers Hyderabad won by 7 wickets |
| 16:00 (D/N); Scorecard | Royal Challengers Bangalore; 160/6 (20 overs) | v | Sunrisers Hyderabad (H); 161/3 (19.4 overs) | Rajiv Gandhi International Stadium, Uppal, Hyderabad; Umpires: Anil Chaudhary (Ind) and Nigel Llong (Eng); Player of the match: David Warner (SRH) |
| 16:00 (D/N); Scorecard | Virat Kohli 67 (41); Bhuvneshwar Kumar 2/27 (4 overs) | | David Warner 59 (46); Varun Aaron 2/36 (4 overs) | Rajiv Gandhi International Stadium, Uppal, Hyderabad; Umpires: Anil Chaudhary (Ind) and Nigel Llong (Eng); Player of the match: David Warner (SRH) |
| Royal Challengers Bangalore won the toss and elected to bat | | | | Rajiv Gandhi International Stadium, Uppal, Hyderabad; Umpires: Anil Chaudhary (Ind) and Nigel Llong (Eng); Player of the match: David Warner (SRH) |

| 22 May | (H) Chennai Super Kings; 185/3 (20 overs) | v | Sunrisers Hyderabad; 189/4 (19.4 overs) | Sunrisers Hyderabad won by 6 wickets |
| 20:00 (D/N); Scorecard | (H) Chennai Super Kings; 185/3 (20 overs) | v | Sunrisers Hyderabad; 189/4 (19.4 overs) | JSCA International Stadium Complex, Ranchi; Umpires: Bruce Oxenford (Aus) and Chettithody Shamshuddin (Ind); Player of the match: David Warner (SRH) |
| 20:00 (D/N); Scorecard | Mahendra Singh Dhoni 57* (41); Karn Sharma 2/19 (4 overs) | | David Warner 90 (45); Suresh Raina 1/17 (2 overs) | JSCA International Stadium Complex, Ranchi; Umpires: Bruce Oxenford (Aus) and Chettithody Shamshuddin (Ind); Player of the match: David Warner (SRH) |
| Sunrisers Hyderabad won the toss and elected to field | | | | JSCA International Stadium Complex, Ranchi; Umpires: Bruce Oxenford (Aus) and Chettithody Shamshuddin (Ind); Player of the match: David Warner (SRH) |

| 24 May | Sunrisers Hyderabad; 160/7 (20 overs) | v | Kolkata Knight Riders (H); 161/6 (14.2 overs) | Kolkata Knight Riders won by 4 wickets |
| 20:00 (D/N); Scorecard | Sunrisers Hyderabad; 160/7 (20 overs) | v | Kolkata Knight Riders (H); 161/6 (14.2 overs) | Eden Gardens, Kolkata; Umpires: Rajesh Deshpande (Ind) and Bruce Oxenford (Aus); Player of the match: Yusuf Pathan (KKR) |
| 20:00 (D/N); Scorecard | Darren Sammy 29 (19); Ryan ten Doeschate 1/7 (1 over) | | Yusuf Pathan 72 (22); Karn Sharma 4/38 (4 overs) | Eden Gardens, Kolkata; Umpires: Rajesh Deshpande (Ind) and Bruce Oxenford (Aus); Player of the match: Yusuf Pathan (KKR) |
| Kolkata Knight Riders won the toss and elected to field; Yusuf Pathan scored the fastest half-century in IPL history | | | | Eden Gardens, Kolkata; Umpires: Rajesh Deshpande (Ind) and Bruce Oxenford (Aus); Player of the match: Yusuf Pathan (KKR) |

== Statistics ==
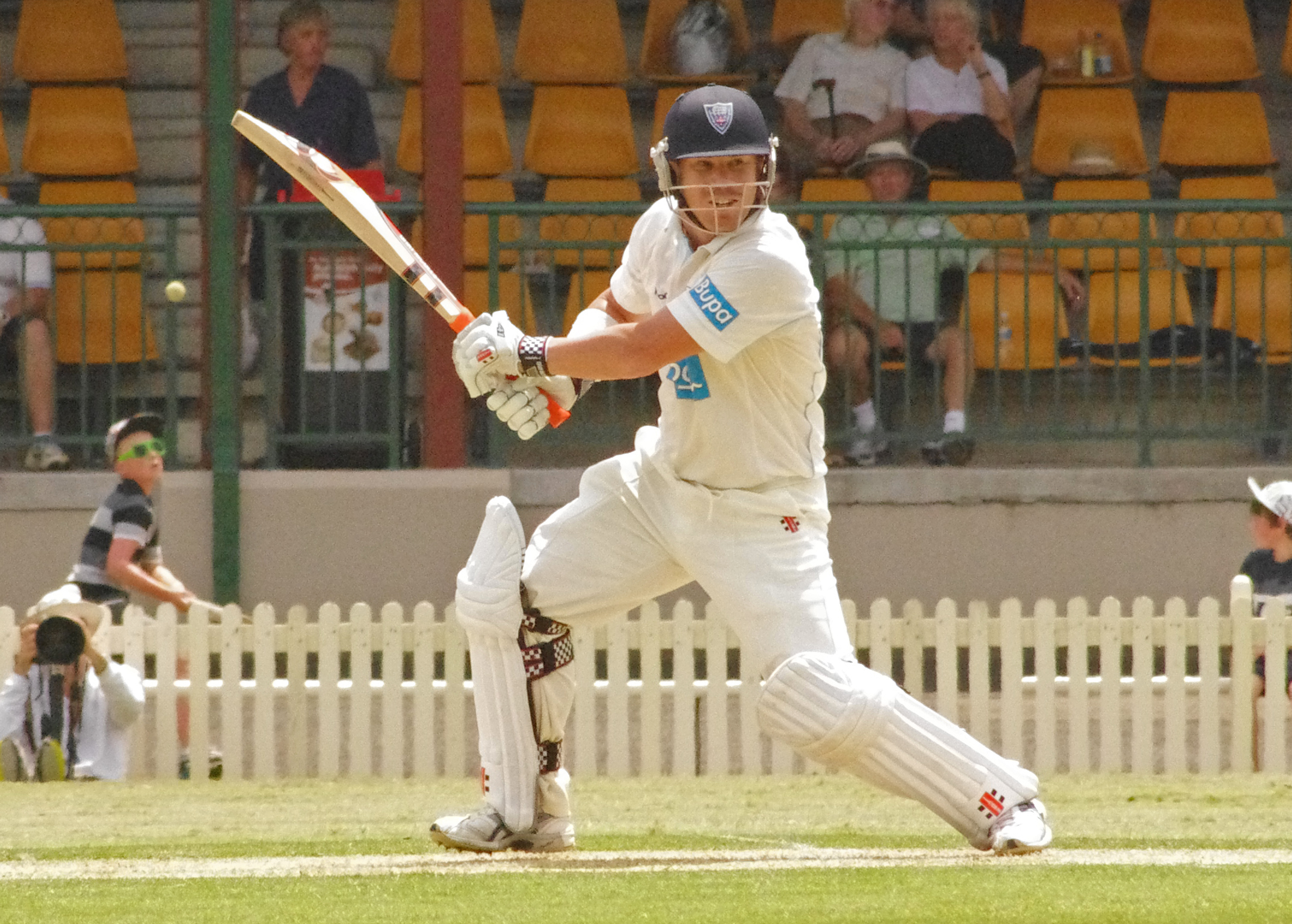
David Warner became highest run-getter for SRH in IPL 2014.

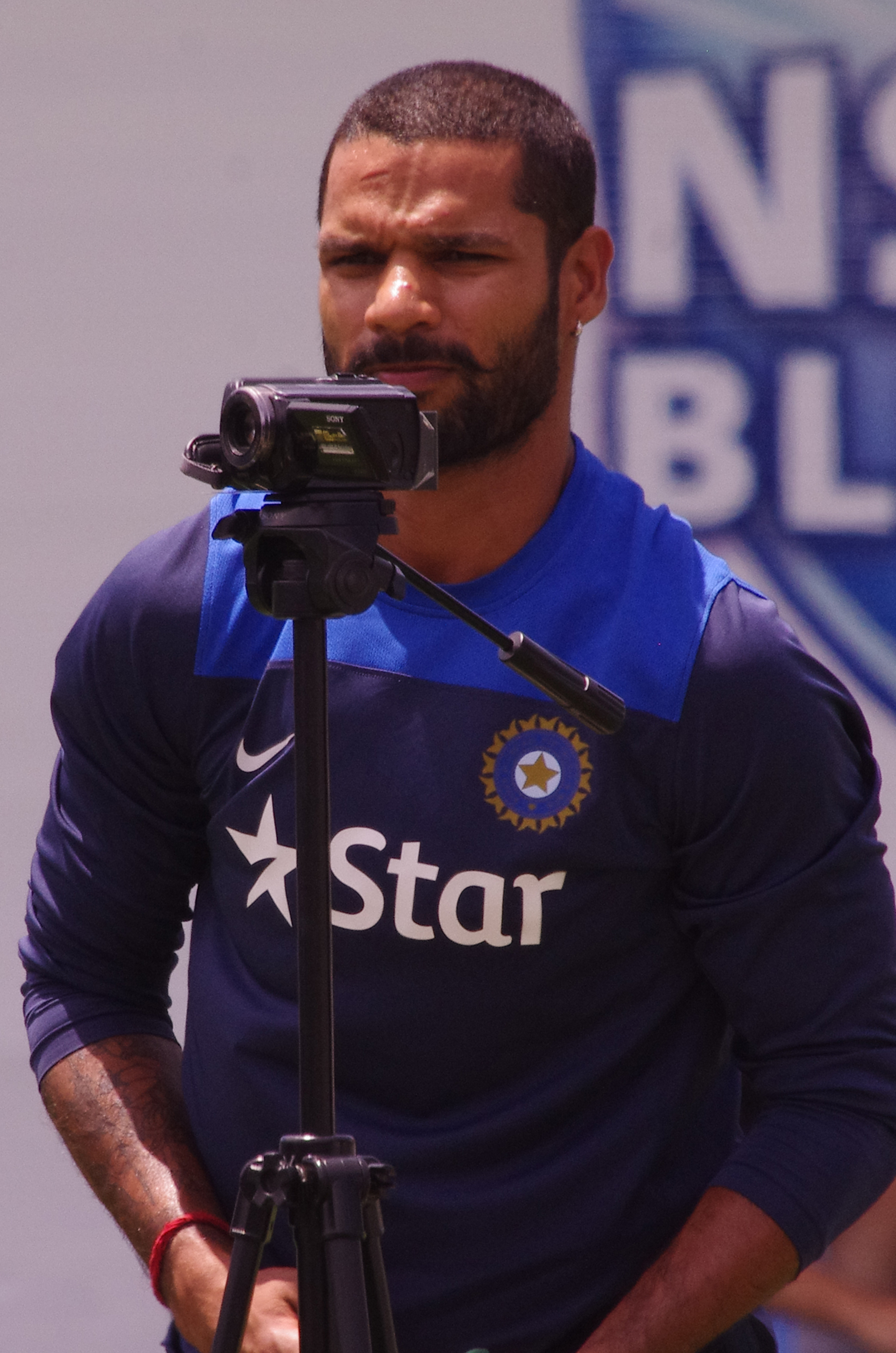
Shikhar Dhawan became second highest run-getter for SRH in IPL 2014.

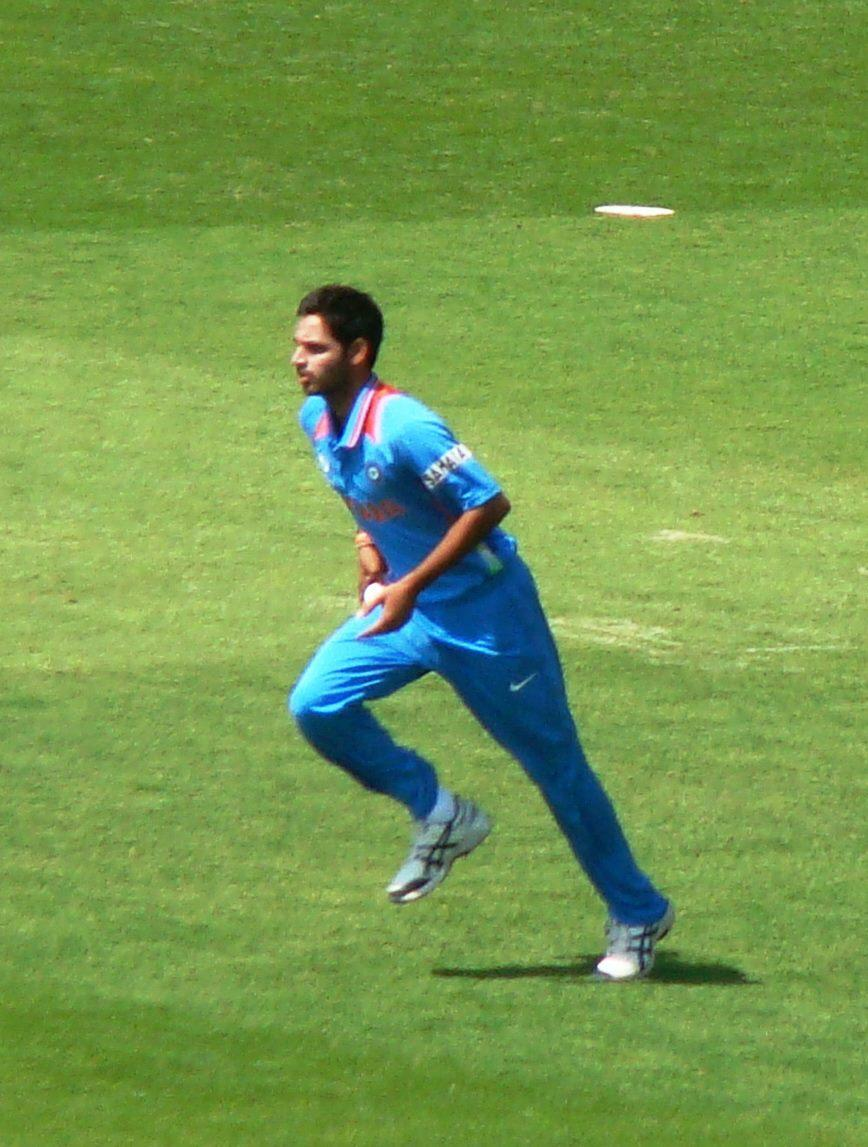
Bhuvneshwar Kumar became highest wicket-taker for SRH in IPL 2014.

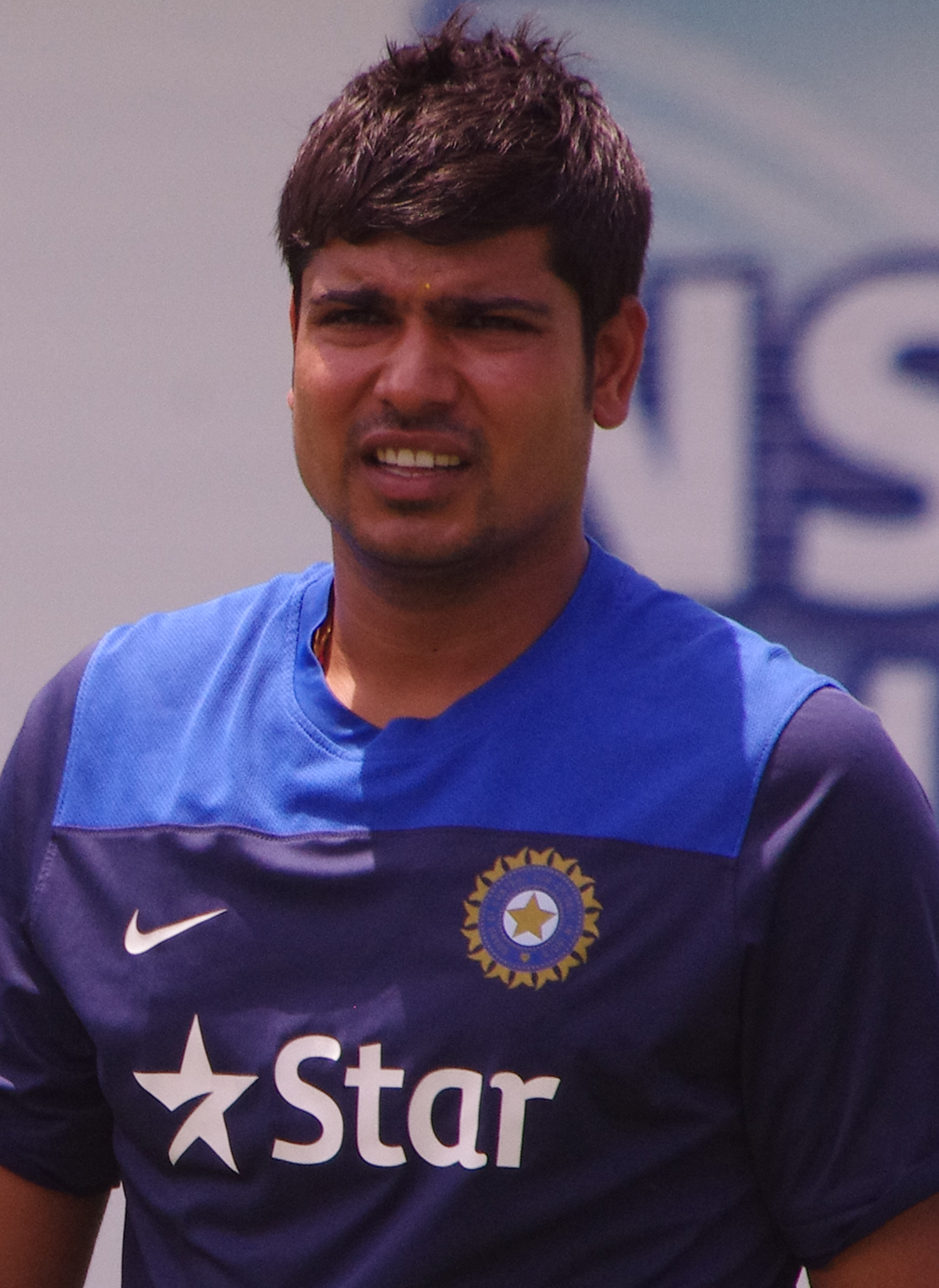
Karn Sharma became second highest wicket-taker for SRH in IPL 2014.

| Name | Mat | Runs | HS | Ave | SR | Wkts | BBI | Ave | Eco | Ct | St |
|---|---|---|---|---|---|---|---|---|---|---|---|
| Shikhar Dhawan | 14 | 377 | 64* | 29.00 | 118.18 | - | - | - | - | 5 | 0 |
| David Warner | 14 | 528 | 90 | 48.00 | 140.80 | - | - | - | - | 8 | 0 |
| Naman Ojha | 11 | 232 | 79* | 38.66 | 144.09 | - | - | - | - | 6 | 1 |
| Aaron Finch | 13 | 309 | 88* | 28.09 | 117.49 | - | - | - | - | 6 | 0 |
| K. L. Rahul | 11 | 166 | 46 | 20.75 | 101.21 | - | - | - | - | 4 | 0 |
| Darren Sammy | 10 | 108 | 29 | 15.42 | 118.68 | 3 | 1/20 | 52.33 | 11.21 | 5 | 0 |
| Venugopal Rao | 7 | 71 | 27 | 23.66 | 112.69 | 0 | - | - | 8.00 | 2 | 0 |
| Irfan Pathan | 10 | 55 | 23* | 27.50 | 101.85 | 4 | 2/10 | 51.25 | 8.66 | 2 | 0 |
| Karn Sharma | 14 | 42 | 17* | 10.50 | 144.82 | 15 | 4/38 | 25.06 | 7.42 | 0 | 0 |
| Dale Steyn | 14 | 22 | 12 | 7.33 | 84.61 | 11 | 2/20 | 39.18 | 7.69 | 7 | 0 |
| Bhuvneshwar Kumar | 14 | 1 | 1 | 1.00 | 25.00 | 20 | 4/14 | 17.70 | 6.65 | 2 | 0 |
| Amit Mishra | 10 | 4 | 4* | 4.00 | 57.14 | 7 | 2/23 | 48.57 | 9.06 | 0 | 0 |
| Moisés Henriques | 4 | 9 | 9 | 4.50 | 64.28 | 4 | 2/26 | 24.00 | 9.60 | 1 | 0 |
| Jason Holder | 1 | 16 | 16 | 16.00 | 133.33 | 1 | 1/35 | 35.00 | 11.66 | 2 | 0 |
| Srikkanth Anirudha | 1 | 3 | 3 | 3.00 | 60.00 | - | - | - | - | 0 | 0 |
| Parvez Rasool | 3 | 0 | 0* | - | 0.00 | 1 | 1/26 | 83.00 | 9.22 | 1 | 0 |
| Ishant Sharma | 3 | - | - | - | - | 3 | 2/37 | 33.66 | 9.18 | 0 | 0 |

Full Table on ESPNcricinfo

Last updated: 26 Oct 2017

== Awards and achievements ==
=== Player of the match awards ===
| No. | Date | Player | Opponent | Venue | Result | Contribution |
|---|---|---|---|---|---|---|
| 1 | 25 April 2014 | Aaron Finch | Delhi Daredevils | Dubai | Won by 4 runs | 88* (53) |
| 2 | 30 April 2014 | Bhuvneshwar Kumar | Mumbai Indians | Dubai | Won by 15 runs | 2/17 (4 overs) |
| 3 | 8 May 2014 | Bhuvneshwar Kumar | Rajasthan Royals | Ahmedabad | Won by 32 runs | 4/14 (4 overs) |
| 4 | 10 May 2014 | Dale Steyn | Delhi Daredevils | Delhi | Won by 8 wickets (D/L) | 2/20 (4 overs) |
| 5 | 20 May 2014 | David Warner | Royal Challengers Bangalore | Hyderabad | Won by 7 Wickets | 59 (46) |
| 6 | 22 May 2014 | David Warner | Chennai Super Kings | Ranchi | Won by 6 Wickets | 90 (45) |

=== Achievements ===
- Best Catches of the season : Dale Steyn

== Reaction ==
The IPL saw increase in its brand value in 2014 to US$3.2 billion while the Sunrisers' brand value was increased by 57% to US$25 million from its purchase value of US$15.9 million in 2013, according to American Appraisal.

== See also ==
- List of Sunrisers Hyderabad records
