= 2014 Chennai Super Kings season =

Indian Premier League team season

Chennai Super Kings
2014 season
- Coach: Stephen Fleming
- Captain: Mahendra Singh Dhoni
- IPL: Play-offs
- CLT20: Champions
- Most runs: Dwayne Smith (566)
- Most wickets: Mohit Sharma (23)
- Most catches: Faf du Plessis (13)
- Most wicket-keeping dismissals: MS Dhoni (4)

Chennai Super Kings (CSK) is a franchise cricket team based in Chennai, India, which plays in the Indian Premier League (IPL). They were one of the eight teams that competed in the 2014 Indian Premier League. They were captained for the seventh season in succession by Indian skipper Mahendra Singh Dhoni.

The Super Kings reached the play-offs of the 2014 IPL, and qualified for the 2014 Champions League Twenty20. They won their second Champions League title after defeating the Kolkata Knight Riders by 8 wickets in the final of the Champions League.

== Background ==
Before the players mega-auction in 2014, the Super Kings retained five players: Mahendra Singh Dhoni, Suresh Raina, Ravindra Jadeja, Ravichandran Ashwin and Dwayne Bravo. The retention left them with a purse of INR21 crores to spend at the auction. At the auction, the franchise bought the likes of Brendon McCullum, Dwayne Smith, Faf du Plessis, Ashish Nehra, Mohit Sharma among others.

== Squad ==
Players with international caps before the start of the 2014 IPL season are listed in bold.

No.	Name	Nationality	Birth date	Batting style	Bowling style	Notes
Batsmen
3	**Suresh Raina**	India	27 November 1986 (aged 27)	Left-handed	Right-arm off break	Vice-captain
12	Mithun Manhas	India	12 October 1979 (aged 34)	Right-handed	Right-arm off break	
13	**Francois du Plessis**	South Africa	13 July 1984 (aged 29)	Right-handed	Right-arm leg break	Overseas
29	**David Hussey**	Australia	15 July 1977 (aged 36)	Right-handed	Right-arm off break	Overseas
All-rounders
5	Baba Aparajith	India	8 July 1994 (aged 19)	Right-handed	Right-arm off break	
8	**Ravindra Jadeja**	India	6 December 1988 (aged 25)	Left-handed	Slow left-arm orthodox	
11	**John Hastings**	Australia	4 November 1985 (aged 28)	Right-handed	Right-arm fast-medium	Overseas
41	Vijay Shankar	India	26 January 1991 (aged 23)	Right-handed	Right-arm off break	
47	**Dwayne Bravo**	Trinidad and Tobago	7 October 1983 (aged 30)	Right-handed	Right-arm medium-fast	Overseas. Withdrew from the tournament.
50	**Dwayne Smith**	Barbados	12 April 1983 (aged 31)	Right-handed	Right-arm medium-fast	Overseas
Wicket-keepers
7	**Mahendra Singh Dhoni**	India	7 July 1981 (aged 32)	Right-handed	Right-arm medium	Captain
42	**Brendon McCullum**	New Zealand	27 September 1981 (aged 32)	Right-handed	Right-arm medium	Overseas
Bowlers
6	Pawan Negi	India	6 January 1993 (aged 21)	Left-handed	Slow left-arm orthodox	
15	Ishwar Pandey	India	15 August 1989 (aged 24)	Right-handed	Right-arm medium-fast	
18	**Mohit Sharma**	India	18 September 1988 (aged 25)	Right-handed	Right-arm medium-fast	
20	**Ben Hilfenhaus**	Australia	15 March 1983 (aged 31)	Right-handed	Right-arm fast-medium	Overseas
21	**Matt Henry**	New Zealand	14 December 1991 (aged 22)	Right-handed	Right-arm fast-medium	Overseas
22	Ronit More	India	11 February 1992 (aged 22)	Right-handed	Right arm medium-fast	
64	**Ashish Nehra**	India	30 April 1979 (aged 34)	Right-handed	Left-arm medium-fast	
77	**Samuel Badree**	Trinidad and Tobago	9 March 1981 (aged 33)	Right-handed	Right-arm leg break	Overseas
99	**Ravichandran Ashwin**	India	17 September 1986 (aged 27)	Right-handed	Right-arm off break	

== Indian Premier League ==
=== Season standings ===
Pos	Team	Pld	W	L	NR	Pts	NRR
1	Kings XI Punjab (R)	14	11	3	0	22	0.968
2	Kolkata Knight Riders (C)	14	9	5	0	18	0.418
3	Chennai Super Kings (3)	14	9	5	0	18	0.385
4	Mumbai Indians (4)	14	7	7	0	14	0.095
5	Rajasthan Royals	14	7	7	0	14	0.060
6	Sunrisers Hyderabad	14	6	8	0	12	−0.399
7	Royal Challengers Bangalore	14	5	9	0	10	−0.428
8	Delhi Daredevils	14	2	12	0	4	−1.182

- Top 4 teams were qualified for the playoffs
- advanced to the Qualifier and 2014 Champions League Twenty20 Group Stage
- advanced to the Eliminator and 2014 Champions League Twenty20 Group Stage
- advanced to the Eliminator and 2014 Champions League Twenty20 Qualifying Stage

=== Match log ===
No.	Date	Opponent	Venue	Result	Scorecard
1	18 April 2014	Kings XI Punjab	Abu Dhabi	Lost by 6 wickets	Scorecard
2	21 April 2014	Delhi Daredevils	Abu Dhabi	Won by 93 runs, MoM – Suresh Raina 56 (41)	Scorecard
3	23 April 2014	Rajasthan Royals	Dubai	Won by 7 runs, MoM – Ravindra Jadeja 36* (33) & 4/33 (4 overs)	Scorecard
4	25 April 2014	Mumbai Indians	Dubai	Won by 7 wickets, MoM – Mohit Sharma 4/14 (4 overs)	Scorecard
5	27 April 2014	Sunrisers Hyderabad	Sharjah	Won by 5 wickets, MoM- Dwayne Smith 66 (46)	Scorecard
6	2 May 2014	Kolkata Knight Riders	Ranchi	Won by 34 runs, MoM – Ravindra Jadeja 17* (10) & 4/12 (4 overs)	Scorecard
7	5 May 2014	Delhi Daredevils	Delhi	Won by 8 wickets, MoM – Dwayne Smith 79 (51)	Scorecard
8	7 May 2014	Kings XI Punjab	Cuttack	Lost by 44 runs	Scorecard
9	10 May 2014	Mumbai Indians	Mumbai	Won by 4 wickets, MoM – Dwayne Smith 57 (51)	Scorecard
10	13 May 2014	Rajasthan Royals	Ranchi	Won by 5 wickets, MoM – Ravindra Jadeja 11* (6) & 2/18 (4 overs)	Scorecard
11	18 May 2014	Royal Challengers Bangalore	Ranchi	Lost by 5 wickets	Scorecard
12	20 May 2014	Kolkata Knight Riders	Kolkata	Lost by 8 wickets	Scorecard
13	22 May 2014	Sunrisers Hyderabad	Ranchi	Lost by 6 wickets	Scorecard
14	24 May 2014	Royal Challengers Bangalore	Bengaluru	Won by 8 wickets, MoM – MS Dhoni 49* (28)	Scorecard
15	28 May 2014	Mumbai Indians (Eliminator)	Mumbai	Won by 7 wickets, MoM – Suresh Raina 54* (33)	Scorecard
16	30 May 2014	Kings XI Punjab (qualifier 2)	Mumbai	Lost by 24 runs	Scorecard
Overall record: 10–6. Reached playoffs. Qualified for 2014 Champions League Twenty20

=== Most runs ===
Player	Innings	Runs	Average	Strike rate	Highest Score	100s	50s
Dwayne Smith	16	566	35.37	136.05	79	0	5
Suresh Raina	16	523	40.23	145.68	87	0	5
Brendon McCullum	14	405	31.15	121.62	71*	0	3
MS Dhoni	15	371	74.20	148.40	57*	0	1
Faf du Plessis	12	303	27.54	128.93	54*	0	2

=== Most wickets ===
Player	Innings	Wickets	Average	Economy rate	Best Bowling	4w
Mohit Sharma	16	23	19.65	8.39	4/14	1
Ravindra Jadeja	16	19	23.31	8.15	4/12	2
Ravichandran Ashwin	16	16	27.31	7.30	3/30	0
Ashish Nehra	4	8	17.75	9.46	3/33	0
Ben Hilfenhaus	8	8	30.75	8.78	2/32	0

== Champions League Twenty20 ==
=== Group standings ===
Team	Pld	W	L	NR	Pts	NRR
Kolkata Knight Riders	4	4	0	0	16	+0.716
Chennai Super Kings	4	2	1	1	10	+0.945
Perth Scorchers	4	2	2	0	8	−0.038
Lahore Lions	4	1	2	1	6	-0.051
Dolphins	4	0	4	0	0	−1.338

Advanced to semifinals

=== Match log ===
Date	Opponent	Venue	Result	Scorecard
17 September 2014	Kolkata Knight Riders	Hyderabad	Lost by 3 wickets	Scorecard
22 September 2014	Dolphins	Bangalore	Won by 54 runs, MoM – Suresh Raina 90 (43)	Scorecard
25 September 2014	Lahore Lions	Bangalore	Match abandoned	Scorecard
27 September 2014	Perth Scorchers	Bangalore	Won by 13 runs, MoM – Ravindra Jadeja 44* (28)	Scorecard
2 October 2014	Kings XI Punjab (semi-final)	Hyderabad	Won by 65 runs, MoM – Dwayne Bravo 67 (39)	Scorecard
4 October 2014	Kolkata Knight Riders (final)	Bangalore	Won by 8 wickets, MoM – Pawan Negi 5/22	Scorecard
Overall Record of 4 – 1 Champions of the 2014 Champions League Twenty20

=== Most runs ===
Player	Innings	Runs	Average	Strike rate	Highest Score	100s	50s
Suresh Raina	5	234	58.50	173.33	109*	1	1
Dwayne Bravo	4	133	44.33	130.39	67	0	1
Brendon McCullum	5	127	25.40	132.29	49	0	0

=== Most wickets ===
Player	Innings	Wickets	Average	Economy rate	Best Bowling	4w
Ashish Nehra	5	10	15.30	8.05	4/21	1
Mohit Sharma	5	8	16.25	8.12	4/41	1
Pawan Negi	2	7	7.14	6.25	5/22	1
