= 2014 Rajasthan Royals season =

Indian Premier League cricket team season

Rajasthan Royals
2014 season
- Coach: Paddy Upton
- Captain: Shane Watson
- Ground(s): Sardar Patel Stadium, Ahmedabad
- IPL: 5th
- Most runs: Ajinkya Rahane and Sanju Samson (339)
- Most wickets: Pravin Tambe (13)

Rajasthan Royals (RR) is a franchise cricket team based in Jaipur, India, which plays in the Indian Premier League (IPL). They were one of the eight teams that competed in the 2014 Indian Premier League. They were captained by Shane Watson. Rajasthan Royals finished 5th in the IPL and did not qualify for the Champions League T20.

== Squad ==
- Players with international caps prior to the start of the 2014 season are listed in **bold**.

No.	Name	Nat	Birth date	Batting Style	Bowling Style	Notes
Batsmen
3	**Ajinkya Rahane**	(India)	5 June 1988 (aged 25)	Right-handed	Right-arm medium	
7	**Brad Hodge**	(Australia)	29 December 1974 (aged 39)	Right-handed	Right-arm off break	Overseas
49	**Steve Smith**	(Australia)	2 June 1989 (aged 24)	Right-handed	Right-arm leg break	Overseas
69	Karun Nair	(India)	6 December 1991 (aged 22)	Right-handed	Right-arm off break	
99	Unmukt Chand	(India)	26 March 1993 (aged 21)	Right-handed	Right-arm off break	
All-rounders
4	Deepak Hooda	(India)	19 April 1995 (aged 18)	Right-handed	Right-arm off break	
20	Rahul Tewatia	(India)	20 May 1993 (aged 20)	Left-handed	Right-arm leg break	
22	Rajat Bhatia	(India)	22 October 1979 (aged 34)	Right-handed	Right-arm medium	
25	**Abhishek Nayar**	(India)	8 October 1983 (aged 30)	Left-handed	Right-arm medium	
31	**Ben Cutting**	(Australia)	30 January 1987 (aged 27)	Right-handed	Right-arm medium-fast	Overseas
33	**Shane Watson**	(Australia)	17 June 1981 (aged 32)	Right-handed	Right-arm fast-medium	Overseas; Captain
44	**James Faulkner**	(Australia)	29 April 1990 (aged 23)	Right-handed	Left-arm medium-fast	Overseas
84	**Stuart Binny**	(India)	3 June 1984 (aged 29)	Right-handed	Right-arm medium	
90	Kevon Cooper	(Trinidad and Tobago)	16 February 1989 (aged 25)	Right-handed	Right-arm medium-fast	Overseas
Wicket-keepers
9	Sanju Samson	(India)	11 November 1994 (aged 19)	Right-handed	–	
27	Ankush Bains	(India)	16 December 1995 (aged 18)	Right-handed	–	
77	Dishant Yagnik	(India)	22 June 1983 (aged 30)	Left-handed	–	
Bowlers
1	Amit Mishra	(India)	11 November 1991 (aged 22)	Right-handed	Right-arm medium-fast	
02	Pravin Tambe	(India)	8 October 1971 (aged 42)	Right-handed	Right-arm leg break	
5	Vikramjeet Malik	(India)	9 May 1983 (aged 30)	Right-handed	Right-arm medium-fast	
8	**Tim Southee**	(New Zealand)	11 December 1988 (aged 25)	Right-handed	Right-arm medium-fast	Overseas
13	Iqbal Abdulla	(India)	2 December 1989 (aged 24)	Left-handed	Slow left-arm orthodox	
18	Ankit Sharma	(India)	20 April 1991 (aged 22)	Left-handed	Slow left-arm orthodox	
23	**Kane Richardson**	(Australia)	12 February 1991 (aged 23)	Right-handed	Right-arm medium-fast	Overseas
91	**Dhawal Kulkarni**	(India)	10 December 1988 (aged 25)	Right-handed	Right-arm medium-fast	

== IPL ==
=== Standings ===
Rajasthan Royals finished 5th in the league stage of IPL 2014.

Pos	Team	Pld	W	L	NR	Pts	NRR
1	Kings XI Punjab (R)	14	11	3	0	22	0.968
2	Kolkata Knight Riders (C)	14	9	5	0	18	0.418
3	Chennai Super Kings (3)	14	9	5	0	18	0.385
4	Mumbai Indians (4)	14	7	7	0	14	0.095
5	Rajasthan Royals	14	7	7	0	14	0.060
6	Sunrisers Hyderabad	14	6	8	0	12	−0.399
7	Royal Challengers Bangalore	14	5	9	0	10	−0.428
8	Delhi Daredevils	14	2	12	0	4	−1.182

- Top 4 teams were qualified for the playoffs
- advanced to the Qualifier and 2014 Champions League Twenty20 Group Stage
- advanced to the Eliminator and 2014 Champions League Twenty20 Group Stage
- advanced to the Eliminator and 2014 Champions League Twenty20 Qualifying Stage

=== Match log ===
No.	Date	Opponent	Venue	Result	Man of the match	Scorecard
Phase 1 Matches in United Arab Emirates
1	18 April 2014	Sunrisers Hyderabad	Abu Dhabi	Won by 4 Wickets	Ajinkya Rahane 59(53)	Scorecard
2	20 April 2014	Kings XI Punjab	Sharjah	Lost by 7 Wickets		Scorecard
3	23 April 2014	Chennai Super Kings	Dubai	Lost by 7 Runs		Scorecard
4	26 April 2014	Royal Challengers Bangalore	Abu Dhabi	Won by 6 Wickets	Pravin Tambe 4/20 (4 overs)	Scorecard
5	29 April 2014	Kolkata Knight Riders	Abu Dhabi	Match Tied; Super Over Tied; Won by Boundary Count	James Faulkner 2*(1) & 3/11 (2 overs)	Scorecard
Phase 2 Matches in India
6	3 May 2014	Delhi Daredevils	New Delhi	Won by 7 Wickets	Karun Nair 73*(50)	Scorecard
7	5 May 2014	Kolkata Knight Riders	Ahmedabad	Won by 10 Runs	Pravin Tambe 3/26 (4 Overs)	Scorecard
8	8 May 2014	Sunrisers Hyderabad	Ahmedabad	Lost by 33 Runs		Scorecard
9	11 May 2014	Royal Challengers Bangalore	Bangalore	Won by 5 Wickets	James Faulkner 41(17) & 1/42 (4 Overs)	Scorecard
10	13 May 2014	Chennai Super Kings	Ranchi	Lost by 5 Wickets		Scorecard
11	15 May 2014	Delhi Daredevils	Ahmedabad	Won by 62 Runs	Ajinkya Rahane 64(50)	Scorecard
12	19 May 2014	Mumbai Indians	Ahmedabad	Lost by 26 Runs		Scorecard
13	23 May 2014	Kings XI Punjab	Mohali	Lost by 17 Runs		Scorecard
14	25 May 2014	Mumbai Indians	Mumbai	Lost by 5 Wickets		Scorecard
