= 2014 Delhi Daredevils season =

Indian Premier League cricket team season

Delhi Daredevils
2014 season
- Coach: Gary Kirsten
- Captain: Kevin Pietersen
- Ground(s): Feroz Shah Kotla, Delhi
- IPL: 8th
- Most runs: Jean Paul Duminy (410)
- Most wickets: Imran Tahir (9)

Delhi Daredevils (DD) are a franchise cricket team based in Delhi, India, which plays in the Indian Premier League (IPL). They were one of the eight teams that competed in the 2014 Indian Premier League. They were captained by Kevin Pietersen. Delhi Daredevils finished eighth in the IPL and did not qualify for the Champions League T20.

== IPL ==
=== Standings ===
Delhi Daredevils finished last in the league stage of IPL 2014.

Pos	Team	Pld	W	L	NR	Pts	NRR
1	Kings XI Punjab (R)	14	11	3	0	22	0.968
2	Kolkata Knight Riders (C)	14	9	5	0	18	0.418
3	Chennai Super Kings (3)	14	9	5	0	18	0.385
4	Mumbai Indians (4)	14	7	7	0	14	0.095
5	Rajasthan Royals	14	7	7	0	14	0.060
6	Sunrisers Hyderabad	14	6	8	0	12	−0.399
7	Royal Challengers Bangalore	14	5	9	0	10	−0.428
8	Delhi Daredevils	14	2	12	0	4	−1.182

- Top 4 teams were qualified for the playoffs
- advanced to the Qualifier and 2014 Champions League Twenty20 Group Stage
- advanced to the Eliminator and 2014 Champions League Twenty20 Group Stage
- advanced to the Eliminator and 2014 Champions League Twenty20 Qualifying Stage

=== Match log ===
No.	Date	Opponent	Venue	Result	Scorecard
1	17 April 2014	Royal Challengers Bangalore	Sharjah	Lost by 8 wickets	Score Card
2	19 April 2014	Kolkata Knight Riders	Dubai	Won by 4 wickets; MoM – JP Duminy 52* (35)	Score Card
3	21 April 2014	Chennai Super Kings	Abu Dhabi	Lost by 93 runs	Score Card
4	25 April 2014	Sunrisers Hyderabad	Dubai	Lost by 5 runs	Score Card
5	27 April 2014	Mumbai Indians	Sharjah	Won by 6 wickets; MoM – Murali Vijay 40 (34)	Score Card
6	3 May 2014	Rajasthan Royals	New Delhi	Lost by 7 wickets	Score Card
7	5 May 2014	Chennai Super Kings	New Delhi	Lost by 8 wickets	Score Card
8	7 May 2014	Kolkata Knight Riders	New Delhi	Lost by 8 wickets	Score Card
9	10 May 2014	Sunrisers Hyderabad	New Delhi	Lost by 8 wickets (D/L method)	Score Card
10	13 May 2014	Royal Challengers Bangalore	Bengaluru	Lost by 16 runs	Score Card
11	15 May 2014	Rajasthan Royals	Ahmedabad	Lost by 63 runs	Score Card
12	19 May 2014	Kings XI Punjab	New Delhi	Lost by 4 wickets	Score Card
13	23 May 2014	Mumbai Indians	Mumbai	Lost by 16 runs	Score Card
14	25 May 2014	Kings XI Punjab	Mohali	Lost by 7 wickets	Score Card
Overall record: 2–12. Failed to advance.

== Statistics ==
Most runs
Player	Runs
JP Duminy	410
Dinesh Karthik	325
Kevin Pietersen	294

Most wickets
Player	Wickets
Imran Tahir	9
Jaydev Unadkat	9
Shahbaz Nadeem	8
