= 2014 Champions League Twenty20 =

International Twenty20 cricket tournament

- Dates: 13 September 2014 – 4 October 2014
- Administrators: BCCI; Cricket Australia; Cricket South Africa
- Cricket format: Twenty20
- Tournament format(s): Round-robin and knockout
- Host: India
- Champions: Chennai Super Kings (2nd title)
- Runners-up: Kolkata Knight Riders
- Participants: 10
- Matches: 23
- Attendance: 847,889 (36,865 per match)
- Player of the series: Suresh Raina
- Most runs: Suresh Raina (234 runs)
- Most wickets: Sunil Narine (12 wickets)
- Official website: clt20.com

The 2014 Champions League Twenty20 was the sixth and final edition of Champions League Twenty20, an international Twenty20 cricket tournament. It was held in India from 13 September to 4 October 2014. Mumbai Indians were the defending champions but failed to qualify. Chennai Super Kings won their second title after defeating Kolkata Knight Riders in the final by 8 wickets.

== Teams ==
Cricket Board	Team	How qualified
Australia	Perth Scorchers	Winners, 2013–14 Big Bash
Australia	Hobart Hurricanes	Runners-up, 2013–14 Big Bash
India	Kolkata Knight Riders	Winners, 2014 IPL
India	Kings XI Punjab	Runners-up, 2014 IPL
India	Chennai Super Kings	Third-ranked team, 2014 IPL
New Zealand	Northern Knights	Qualifying stage
Pakistan	Lahore Lions	Qualifying stage
South Africa	Cape Cobras	Runners-up, 2013–14 Ram Slam
South Africa	Dolphins	Winners, 2013–14 Ram Slam
West Indies	Barbados Tridents	Winners, 2014 CPL

== Squads ==
On 22 August 2014, the 12 participating teams announced their final 15-man squads for the tournament.

== Qualifying stage ==
Pos	Team	Pld	W	L	NR	Pts	NRR
1	Northern Knights (1)	3	3	0	0	12	2.080
2	Lahore Lions (2)	3	2	1	0	8	−0.065
3	Mumbai Indians	3	1	2	0	4	−0.064
4	Southern Express	3	0	3	0	0	−2.033

- 2 Advanced to Group A
- 1 Advanced to Group B

13 September	Southern Express; 92/5 (10 overs)	v	Northern Knights; 96/3 (9.3 overs)	Northern Knights won by 7 wickets
16:00 (D/N); Scorecard	Southern Express; 92/5 (10 overs)	v	Northern Knights; 96/3 (9.3 overs)	Shaheed Veer Narayan Singh International Cricket Stadium, Raipur; Attendance: 35,557; Umpires: Anil Chaudhary (Ind) and Chettithody Shamshuddin (Ind); Player of the match: Kane Williamson (NK)
16:00 (D/N); Scorecard	Danushka Gunathilaka 39 (26); Trent Boult 2/12 (2 overs)		Kane Williamson 52 (29); Farveez Maharoof 2/14 (2 overs)	Shaheed Veer Narayan Singh International Cricket Stadium, Raipur; Attendance: 35,557; Umpires: Anil Chaudhary (Ind) and Chettithody Shamshuddin (Ind); Player of the match: Kane Williamson (NK)
Northern Knights won the toss and elected to field; Rain reduced the match to 10 overs per side				Shaheed Veer Narayan Singh International Cricket Stadium, Raipur; Attendance: 35,557; Umpires: Anil Chaudhary (Ind) and Chettithody Shamshuddin (Ind); Player of the match: Kane Williamson (NK)

13 September	Mumbai Indians; 135/7 (20 overs)	v	Lahore Lions; 139/4 (18.4 overs)	Lahore Lions won by 6 wickets
20:00 (D/N); Scorecard	Mumbai Indians; 135/7 (20 overs)	v	Lahore Lions; 139/4 (18.4 overs)	Shaheed Veer Narayan Singh International Cricket Stadium, Raipur; Attendance: 45,611; Umpires: Vineet Kulkarni (Ind) and Chettithody Shamshuddin (Ind); Player of the match: Umar Akmal (LL)
20:00 (D/N); Scorecard	Aditya Tare 37 (36); Aizaz Cheema 2/22 (4 overs)		Umar Akmal 38* (18); Pragyan Ojha 2/18 (4 overs)	Shaheed Veer Narayan Singh International Cricket Stadium, Raipur; Attendance: 45,611; Umpires: Vineet Kulkarni (Ind) and Chettithody Shamshuddin (Ind); Player of the match: Umar Akmal (LL)
Lahore Lions won the toss and elected to field				Shaheed Veer Narayan Singh International Cricket Stadium, Raipur; Attendance: 45,611; Umpires: Vineet Kulkarni (Ind) and Chettithody Shamshuddin (Ind); Player of the match: Umar Akmal (LL)

14 September	Northern Knights; 170/6 (20 overs)	v	Lahore Lions; 98 (18 overs)	Northern Knights won by 72 runs
16:00 (D/N); Scorecard	Northern Knights; 170/6 (20 overs)	v	Lahore Lions; 98 (18 overs)	Shaheed Veer Narayan Singh International Cricket Stadium, Raipur; Attendance: 29,482; Umpires: Anil Chaudhary (Ind) and Vineet Kulkarni (Ind); Player of the match: Tim Southee (NK)
16:00 (D/N); Scorecard	Daniel Flynn 53 (30); Aizaz Cheema 3/35 (4 overs)		Saad Nasim 58 (40); Tim Southee 3/22 (4 overs)	Shaheed Veer Narayan Singh International Cricket Stadium, Raipur; Attendance: 29,482; Umpires: Anil Chaudhary (Ind) and Vineet Kulkarni (Ind); Player of the match: Tim Southee (NK)
Lahore Lions won the toss and elected to field				Shaheed Veer Narayan Singh International Cricket Stadium, Raipur; Attendance: 29,482; Umpires: Anil Chaudhary (Ind) and Vineet Kulkarni (Ind); Player of the match: Tim Southee (NK)

14 September	Southern Express; 161/6 (20 overs)	v	Mumbai Indians; 165/1 (16.2 overs)	Mumbai Indians won by 9 wickets
20:00 (D/N); Scorecard	Southern Express; 161/6 (20 overs)	v	Mumbai Indians; 165/1 (16.2 overs)	Shaheed Veer Narayan Singh International Cricket Stadium, Raipur; Attendance: 33,790; Umpires: Anil Chaudhary (Ind) and Chettithody Shamshuddin (Ind); Player of the match: Lendl Simmons (MI)
20:00 (D/N); Scorecard	Farveez Maharoof 41* (22); Jalaj Saxena 1/3 (1 over)		Lendl Simmons 76* (51); Sachith Pathirana 1/26 (1.2 overs)	Shaheed Veer Narayan Singh International Cricket Stadium, Raipur; Attendance: 33,790; Umpires: Anil Chaudhary (Ind) and Chettithody Shamshuddin (Ind); Player of the match: Lendl Simmons (MI)
Mumbai Indians won the toss and elected to field				Shaheed Veer Narayan Singh International Cricket Stadium, Raipur; Attendance: 33,790; Umpires: Anil Chaudhary (Ind) and Chettithody Shamshuddin (Ind); Player of the match: Lendl Simmons (MI)

16 September	Lahore Lions; 164/6 (20 overs)	v	Southern Express; 109 (18 overs)	Lahore Lions won by 55 runs
16:00 (D/N); Scorecard	Lahore Lions; 164/6 (20 overs)	v	Southern Express; 109 (18 overs)	Shaheed Veer Narayan Singh International Cricket Stadium, Raipur; Attendance: 20,249; Umpires: Vineet Kulkarni (Ind) and CK Nandan (Ind); Player of the match: Mohammad Hafeez (LL)
16:00 (D/N); Scorecard	Mohammad Hafeez 67 (40); Farveez Maharoof 3/28 (4 overs)		Jehan Mubarak 35 (26); Aizaz Cheema 3/15 (3 overs)	Shaheed Veer Narayan Singh International Cricket Stadium, Raipur; Attendance: 20,249; Umpires: Vineet Kulkarni (Ind) and CK Nandan (Ind); Player of the match: Mohammad Hafeez (LL)
Southern Express won the toss and elected to field				Shaheed Veer Narayan Singh International Cricket Stadium, Raipur; Attendance: 20,249; Umpires: Vineet Kulkarni (Ind) and CK Nandan (Ind); Player of the match: Mohammad Hafeez (LL)

16 September	Mumbai Indians; 132/9 (20 overs)	v	Northern Knights; 133/4 (17.2 overs)	Northern Knights won by 6 wickets
20:00 (D/N); Scorecard	Mumbai Indians; 132/9 (20 overs)	v	Northern Knights; 133/4 (17.2 overs)	Shaheed Veer Narayan Singh International Cricket Stadium, Raipur; Attendance: 38,609; Umpires: Vineet Kulkarni (Ind) and Krishnaraj Srinath (Ind); Player of the match: Scott Styris (NK)
20:00 (D/N); Scorecard	Kieron Pollard 31 (24); Scott Styris 3/21 (4 overs)		Kane Williamson 53 (36); Jasprit Bumrah 2/26 (4 overs)	Shaheed Veer Narayan Singh International Cricket Stadium, Raipur; Attendance: 38,609; Umpires: Vineet Kulkarni (Ind) and Krishnaraj Srinath (Ind); Player of the match: Scott Styris (NK)
Northern Knights won the toss and elected to field; As result of this match, Lahore Lions advanced to Group A and Northern Districts advanced to Group B				Shaheed Veer Narayan Singh International Cricket Stadium, Raipur; Attendance: 38,609; Umpires: Vineet Kulkarni (Ind) and Krishnaraj Srinath (Ind); Player of the match: Scott Styris (NK)

== Group stage ==
=== Group A ===
Pos	Team	Pld	W	L	NR	Pts	NRR
1	Kolkata Knight Riders	4	4	0	0	16	0.716
2	Chennai Super Kings	4	2	1	1	10	0.945
3	Perth Scorchers	4	2	2	0	8	−0.038
4	Lahore Lions	4	1	2	1	6	−0.051
5	Dolphins	4	0	4	0	0	−1.338

Advanced to semifinals

17 September	Chennai Super Kings; 158/4 (20 overs)	v	Kolkata Knight Riders; 159/7 (19 overs)	Kolkata Knight Riders won by 3 wickets
20:00 (D/N); Scorecard	Chennai Super Kings; 158/4 (20 overs)	v	Kolkata Knight Riders; 159/7 (19 overs)	Rajiv Gandhi International Stadium, Hyderabad; Attendance: 49,329; Umpires: Kumar Dharmasena (SL) and Chettithody Shamshuddin (Ind); Player of the match: Andre Russell (KKR)
20:00 (D/N); Scorecard	Mahendra Singh Dhoni 35* (20); Piyush Chawla 2/26 (4 overs)		Andre Russell 58 (25); Ashish Nehra 4/21 (4 overs)	Rajiv Gandhi International Stadium, Hyderabad; Attendance: 49,329; Umpires: Kumar Dharmasena (SL) and Chettithody Shamshuddin (Ind); Player of the match: Andre Russell (KKR)
Kolkata Knight Riders won the toss and chose to field				Rajiv Gandhi International Stadium, Hyderabad; Attendance: 49,329; Umpires: Kumar Dharmasena (SL) and Chettithody Shamshuddin (Ind); Player of the match: Andre Russell (KKR)

20 September	Dolphins; 164/7 (20 overs)	v	Perth Scorchers; 165/4 (20 overs)	Perth Scorchers won by 6 wickets
16:00 (D/N); Scorecard	Dolphins; 164/7 (20 overs)	v	Perth Scorchers; 165/4 (20 overs)	Shaheed Veer Narayan Singh International Cricket Stadium, Raipur; Attendance: 26,798; Umpires: S Ravi (Ind) and Rod Tucker (Aus); Player of the match: Mitchell Marsh (PS)
16:00 (D/N); Scorecard	Khaya Zondo 63* (50); Jason Behrendorff 3/46 (4 overs)		Sam Whiteman 45 (32); Kyle Abbott 1/25 (4 overs)	Shaheed Veer Narayan Singh International Cricket Stadium, Raipur; Attendance: 26,798; Umpires: S Ravi (Ind) and Rod Tucker (Aus); Player of the match: Mitchell Marsh (PS)
Dolphins won the toss and chose to bat				Shaheed Veer Narayan Singh International Cricket Stadium, Raipur; Attendance: 26,798; Umpires: S Ravi (Ind) and Rod Tucker (Aus); Player of the match: Mitchell Marsh (PS)

21 September	Lahore Lions; 151/7 (20 overs)	v	Kolkata Knight Riders; 153/6 (19.3 overs)	Kolkata Knight Riders won by 4 wickets
20:00 (D/N); Scorecard	Lahore Lions; 151/7 (20 overs)	v	Kolkata Knight Riders; 153/6 (19.3 overs)	Rajiv Gandhi International Stadium, Hyderabad; Attendance: 44,174; Umpires: Kumar Dharmasena (SL) and Chettithody Shamshuddin (Ind); Player of the match: Sunil Narine (KKR)
20:00 (D/N); Scorecard	Ahmed Shehzad 59 (42); Sunil Narine 3/9 (4 overs)		Gautam Gambhir 60 (47); Aizaz Cheema 2/42 (4 overs)	Rajiv Gandhi International Stadium, Hyderabad; Attendance: 44,174; Umpires: Kumar Dharmasena (SL) and Chettithody Shamshuddin (Ind); Player of the match: Sunil Narine (KKR)
Kolkata Knight Riders won the toss and chose to field				Rajiv Gandhi International Stadium, Hyderabad; Attendance: 44,174; Umpires: Kumar Dharmasena (SL) and Chettithody Shamshuddin (Ind); Player of the match: Sunil Narine (KKR)

22 September	Chennai Super Kings; 242/6 (20 overs)	v	Dolphins; 188 (20 overs)	Chennai Super Kings won by 54 runs
20:00 (D/N); Scorecard	Chennai Super Kings; 242/6 (20 overs)	v	Dolphins; 188 (20 overs)	M. Chinnaswamy Stadium, Bengaluru; Attendance: 32,203; Umpires: Vineet Kulkarni (Ind) and Krishnaraj Srinath (Ind); Player of the match: Suresh Raina (CSK)
20:00 (D/N); Scorecard	Suresh Raina 90 (43); Robbie Frylinck 2/52 (4 overs)		Cody Chetty 37 (28); Mohit Sharma 4/41 (4 overs)	M. Chinnaswamy Stadium, Bengaluru; Attendance: 32,203; Umpires: Vineet Kulkarni (Ind) and Krishnaraj Srinath (Ind); Player of the match: Suresh Raina (CSK)
Dolphins won the toss and chose to field				M. Chinnaswamy Stadium, Bengaluru; Attendance: 32,203; Umpires: Vineet Kulkarni (Ind) and Krishnaraj Srinath (Ind); Player of the match: Suresh Raina (CSK)

24 September	Perth Scorchers; 151/7 (20 overs)	v	Kolkata Knight Riders; 153/7 (19.4 overs)	Kolkata Knight Riders won by 3 wickets
20:00 (D/N); Scorecard	Perth Scorchers; 151/7 (20 overs)	v	Kolkata Knight Riders; 153/7 (19.4 overs)	Rajiv Gandhi International Stadium, Hyderabad; Attendance: 32,723; Umpires: Anil Chaudhary (Ind) and Krishnaraj Srinath (Ind); Player of the match: Kuldeep Yadav (KKR)
20:00 (D/N); Scorecard	Adam Voges 71* (52); Sunil Narine 4/31 (4 overs)		Suryakumar Yadav 43* (19); Yasir Arafat 3/39 (3.4 overs)	Rajiv Gandhi International Stadium, Hyderabad; Attendance: 32,723; Umpires: Anil Chaudhary (Ind) and Krishnaraj Srinath (Ind); Player of the match: Kuldeep Yadav (KKR)
Perth Scorchers won the toss and chose to bat; As a result of this match, Kolkata Knight Riders qualified for the semifinals				Rajiv Gandhi International Stadium, Hyderabad; Attendance: 32,723; Umpires: Anil Chaudhary (Ind) and Krishnaraj Srinath (Ind); Player of the match: Kuldeep Yadav (KKR)

25 September	Chennai Super Kings	v	Lahore Lions	Match abandoned
20:00 (D/N); Scorecard	Chennai Super Kings	v	Lahore Lions	M. Chinnaswamy Stadium, Bengaluru; Umpires: Vineet Kulkarni (Ind) and CK Nandan (Ind)
Match abandoned without a toss due to rain				M. Chinnaswamy Stadium, Bengaluru; Umpires: Vineet Kulkarni (Ind) and CK Nandan (Ind)

27 September	Lahore Lions; 164/5 (20 overs)	v	Dolphins; 148/9 (20 overs)	Lahore Lions won by 16 runs
16:00 (D/N); Scorecard	Lahore Lions; 164/5 (20 overs)	v	Dolphins; 148/9 (20 overs)	M. Chinnaswamy Stadium, Bengaluru; Attendance: 32,999; Umpires: Kumar Dharmasena (SL) and Vineet Kulkarni (Ind); Player of the match: Umar Akmal (LL)
16:00 (D/N); Scorecard	Umar Akmal 73* (45); Robbie Frylinck 3/22 (4 overs)		Robbie Frylinck 63* (27); Mohammad Hafeez 2/18 (4 overs)	M. Chinnaswamy Stadium, Bengaluru; Attendance: 32,999; Umpires: Kumar Dharmasena (SL) and Vineet Kulkarni (Ind); Player of the match: Umar Akmal (LL)
Lahore Lions won the toss and chose to bat; As a result of this match, Dolphins were eliminated				M. Chinnaswamy Stadium, Bengaluru; Attendance: 32,999; Umpires: Kumar Dharmasena (SL) and Vineet Kulkarni (Ind); Player of the match: Umar Akmal (LL)

27 September	Chennai Super Kings; 155/6 (20 overs)	v	Perth Scorchers; 142/7 (20 overs)	Chennai Super Kings won by 13 runs
20:00 (D/N); Scorecard	Chennai Super Kings; 155/6 (20 overs)	v	Perth Scorchers; 142/7 (20 overs)	M. Chinnaswamy Stadium, Bengaluru; Attendance: 36,378; Umpires: Kumar Dharmasena (SL) and Vineet Kulkarni (Ind); Player of the match: Ravindra Jadeja (CSK)
20:00 (D/N); Scorecard	Ravindra Jadeja 44* (28); Joel Paris 1/13 (2 overs)		Nathan Coulter-Nile 30 (21); Ravichandran Ashwin 3/20 (4 overs)	M. Chinnaswamy Stadium, Bengaluru; Attendance: 36,378; Umpires: Kumar Dharmasena (SL) and Vineet Kulkarni (Ind); Player of the match: Ravindra Jadeja (CSK)
Perth Scorchers won the toss and elected to field; As a result of this match, Perth Scorchers were eliminated				M. Chinnaswamy Stadium, Bengaluru; Attendance: 36,378; Umpires: Kumar Dharmasena (SL) and Vineet Kulkarni (Ind); Player of the match: Ravindra Jadeja (CSK)

29 September	Kolkata Knight Riders; 187/2 (20 overs)	v	Dolphins; 151/8 (20 overs)	Kolkata Knight Riders won by 36 runs
20:00 (D/N); Scorecard	Kolkata Knight Riders; 187/2 (20 overs)	v	Dolphins; 151/8 (20 overs)	Rajiv Gandhi International Stadium, Hyderabad; Attendance: 33,725; Umpires: Anil Chaudhary (Ind) and Chettithody Shamshuddin (Ind); Player of the match: Robin Uthappa (KKR)
20:00 (D/N); Scorecard	Robin Uthappa 85* (55); Robbie Frylinck 1/29 (4 overs)		Andile Phehlukwayo 37 (18); Sunil Narine 3/33 (4 overs)	Rajiv Gandhi International Stadium, Hyderabad; Attendance: 33,725; Umpires: Anil Chaudhary (Ind) and Chettithody Shamshuddin (Ind); Player of the match: Robin Uthappa (KKR)
Kolkata Knight Riders won the toss and choose to bat				Rajiv Gandhi International Stadium, Hyderabad; Attendance: 33,725; Umpires: Anil Chaudhary (Ind) and Chettithody Shamshuddin (Ind); Player of the match: Robin Uthappa (KKR)

30 September	Lahore Lions; 124/6 (20 overs)	v	Perth Scorchers; 130/7 (19 overs)	Perth Scorchers won by 3 wickets
16:00 (D/N); Scorecard	Lahore Lions; 124/6 (20 overs)	v	Perth Scorchers; 130/7 (19 overs)	M. Chinnaswamy Stadium, Bengaluru; Attendance: 5,836; Umpires: Billy Bowden (NZ) and Rod Tucker (Aus); Player of the match: Mitchell Marsh (PS)
16:00 (D/N); Scorecard	Saad Nasim 69* (55); Joel Paris 3/22 (4 overs)		Mitchell Marsh 63* (38); Mohammad Hafeez 2/8 (4 overs)	M. Chinnaswamy Stadium, Bengaluru; Attendance: 5,836; Umpires: Billy Bowden (NZ) and Rod Tucker (Aus); Player of the match: Mitchell Marsh (PS)
Perth Scorchers won the toss and chose to field; As a result of this match, Chennai Super Kings qualified for the semifinals and Lahore Lions were eliminated; This was Cameron Bancroft's Debut T20 match				M. Chinnaswamy Stadium, Bengaluru; Attendance: 5,836; Umpires: Billy Bowden (NZ) and Rod Tucker (Aus); Player of the match: Mitchell Marsh (PS)

=== Group B ===
Pos	Team	Pld	W	L	NR	Pts	NRR
1	Kings XI Punjab	4	4	0	0	16	2.130
2	Hobart Hurricanes	4	3	1	0	12	1.193
3	Barbados Tridents	4	1	3	0	4	−0.230
4	Cape Cobras	4	1	3	0	4	−0.955
5	Northern Knights	4	1	3	0	4	−2.697

Advanced to semifinals

18 September	Hobart Hurricanes; 144/6 (20 overs)	v	Kings XI Punjab; 146/5 (17.4 overs)	Kings XI Punjab won by 5 wickets
20:00 (D/N); Scorecard	Hobart Hurricanes; 144/6 (20 overs)	v	Kings XI Punjab; 146/5 (17.4 overs)	Punjab Cricket Association Stadium, Mohali; Attendance: 22,342; Umpires: S Ravi (Ind) and Rod Tucker (Aus); Player of the match: Thisara Perera (KXIP)
20:00 (D/N); Scorecard	Jonathan Wells 28 (18); Thisara Perera 2/17 (3 overs)		Glenn Maxwell 43 (25); Doug Bollinger 2/30 (4 overs)	Punjab Cricket Association Stadium, Mohali; Attendance: 22,342; Umpires: S Ravi (Ind) and Rod Tucker (Aus); Player of the match: Thisara Perera (KXIP)
Kings XI Punjab won the toss and chose to field				Punjab Cricket Association Stadium, Mohali; Attendance: 22,342; Umpires: S Ravi (Ind) and Rod Tucker (Aus); Player of the match: Thisara Perera (KXIP)

19 September	Northern Knights; 206/5 (20 overs)	v	Cape Cobras; 44/2 (7.2 overs)	Northern Knights won by 33 runs (D/L)
20:00 (D/N); Scorecard	Northern Knights; 206/5 (20 overs)	v	Cape Cobras; 44/2 (7.2 overs)	Shaheed Veer Narayan Singh International Cricket Stadium, Raipur; Attendance: 23,528; Umpires: Kumar Dharmasena (SL) and Anil Chaudhary (Ind); Player of the match: Kane Williamson (NK)
20:00 (D/N); Scorecard	Kane Williamson 101* (49); Charl Langeveldt 2/27 (4 overs)		Hashim Amla 20 (14); Trent Boult 1/8 (2 overs)	Shaheed Veer Narayan Singh International Cricket Stadium, Raipur; Attendance: 23,528; Umpires: Kumar Dharmasena (SL) and Anil Chaudhary (Ind); Player of the match: Kane Williamson (NK)
Cape Cobras won the toss and chose to field; Rain stopped play during the Knights innings. Their par score after 7.2 overs was 77 runs according to the Duckworth–Lewis method; Kane Williamson scored the fastest hundred in Champions League Twenty20				Shaheed Veer Narayan Singh International Cricket Stadium, Raipur; Attendance: 23,528; Umpires: Kumar Dharmasena (SL) and Anil Chaudhary (Ind); Player of the match: Kane Williamson (NK)

20 September	Barbados Tridents; 174/6 (20 overs)	v	Kings XI Punjab; 178/6 (19.4 overs)	Kings XI Punjab won by 4 wickets
20:00 (D/N); Scorecard	Barbados Tridents; 174/6 (20 overs)	v	Kings XI Punjab; 178/6 (19.4 overs)	Punjab Cricket Association Stadium, Mohali; Attendance: 25,974; Umpires: Billy Bowden (NZ) and S Ravi (Ind); Player of the match: David Miller (KXIP)
20:00 (D/N); Scorecard	Raymon Reifer 60* (42); Parvinder Awana 3/46 (4 overs)		David Miller 46* (34); Jeevan Mendis 2/18 (4 overs)	Punjab Cricket Association Stadium, Mohali; Attendance: 25,974; Umpires: Billy Bowden (NZ) and S Ravi (Ind); Player of the match: David Miller (KXIP)
Kings XI Punjab won the toss and chose to field				Punjab Cricket Association Stadium, Mohali; Attendance: 25,974; Umpires: Billy Bowden (NZ) and S Ravi (Ind); Player of the match: David Miller (KXIP)

21 September	Cape Cobras; 184/6 (20 overs)	v	Hobart Hurricanes; 186/4 (19 overs)	Hobart Hurricanes won by 6 wickets
16:00 (D/N); Scorecard	Cape Cobras; 184/6 (20 overs)	v	Hobart Hurricanes; 186/4 (19 overs)	Rajiv Gandhi International Stadium, Hyderabad; Attendance: 34,738; Umpires: Anil Chaudhary (Ind) and Chettithody Shamshuddin (Ind); Player of the match: Aiden Blizzard (HH)
16:00 (D/N); Scorecard	Richard Levi 42 (30); Ben Laughlin 2/31 (4 overs)		Aiden Blizzard 78* (48); Sybrand Engelbrecht 3/20 (4 overs)	Rajiv Gandhi International Stadium, Hyderabad; Attendance: 34,738; Umpires: Anil Chaudhary (Ind) and Chettithody Shamshuddin (Ind); Player of the match: Aiden Blizzard (HH)
Cape Cobras won the toss and chose to bat				Rajiv Gandhi International Stadium, Hyderabad; Attendance: 34,738; Umpires: Anil Chaudhary (Ind) and Chettithody Shamshuddin (Ind); Player of the match: Aiden Blizzard (HH)

23 September	Hobart Hurricanes; 178/3 (20 overs)	v	Northern Knights; 92 (16.4 overs)	Hobart Hurricanes won by 86 runs
20:00 (D/N); Scorecard	Hobart Hurricanes; 178/3 (20 overs)	v	Northern Knights; 92 (16.4 overs)	Shaheed Veer Narayan Singh International Cricket Stadium, Raipur; Attendance: 36,552; Umpires: CK Nandan (Ind) and Chettithody Shamshuddin (Ind); Player of the match: Ben Hilfenhaus (HH)
20:00 (D/N); Scorecard	Aiden Blizzard 62 (43); Tim Southee 1/29 (4 overs)		Scott Styris 37 (27); Ben Hilfenhaus 3/14 (4 overs)	Shaheed Veer Narayan Singh International Cricket Stadium, Raipur; Attendance: 36,552; Umpires: CK Nandan (Ind) and Chettithody Shamshuddin (Ind); Player of the match: Ben Hilfenhaus (HH)
Northern Knights won the toss and chose to field				Shaheed Veer Narayan Singh International Cricket Stadium, Raipur; Attendance: 36,552; Umpires: CK Nandan (Ind) and Chettithody Shamshuddin (Ind); Player of the match: Ben Hilfenhaus (HH)

26 September	Barbados Tridents; 174/8 (20 overs)	v	Cape Cobras; 174/5 (20 overs)	Match tied, Cape Cobras won by Super Over
16:00 (D/N); Scorecard	Barbados Tridents; 174/8 (20 overs)	v	Cape Cobras; 174/5 (20 overs)	Punjab Cricket Association Stadium, Mohali; Attendance: 14,833; Umpires: Billy Bowden (NZ) and Rod Tucker (Aus); Player of the match: Sybrand Engelbrecht (CC)
16:00 (D/N); Scorecard	Jonathan Carter 111* (68); Sybrand Engelbrecht 2/24 (4 overs)		Hashim Amla 59 (42); Jeevan Mendis 4/27 (4 overs)	Punjab Cricket Association Stadium, Mohali; Attendance: 14,833; Umpires: Billy Bowden (NZ) and Rod Tucker (Aus); Player of the match: Sybrand Engelbrecht (CC)
Cape Cobras won the toss and chose to field				Punjab Cricket Association Stadium, Mohali; Attendance: 14,833; Umpires: Billy Bowden (NZ) and Rod Tucker (Aus); Player of the match: Sybrand Engelbrecht (CC)

26 September	Kings XI Punjab; 215/5 (20 overs)	v	Northern Knights; 95 (15.2 overs)	Kings XI Punjab won by 120 runs
20:00 (D/N); Scorecard	Kings XI Punjab; 215/5 (20 overs)	v	Northern Knights; 95 (15.2 overs)	Punjab Cricket Association Stadium, Mohali; Attendance: 26,888; Umpires: S Ravi (Ind) and Rod Tucker (Aus); Player of the match: Manan Vohra (KXIP)
20:00 (D/N); Scorecard	Manan Vohra 65 (32); Scott Kuggeleijn 2/34 (4 overs)		Anton Devcich 28 (15); Karanveer Singh 4/15 (3.2 overs)	Punjab Cricket Association Stadium, Mohali; Attendance: 26,888; Umpires: S Ravi (Ind) and Rod Tucker (Aus); Player of the match: Manan Vohra (KXIP)
Northern Knights won the toss and chose to field; As a result of this match, Kings XI Punjab qualified for the semifinals				Punjab Cricket Association Stadium, Mohali; Attendance: 26,888; Umpires: S Ravi (Ind) and Rod Tucker (Aus); Player of the match: Manan Vohra (KXIP)

28 September	Barbados Tridents; 113 (19.4 overs)	v	Hobart Hurricanes; 117/4 (18.2 overs)	Hobart Hurricanes won by 6 wickets
16:00 (D/N); Scorecard	Barbados Tridents; 113 (19.4 overs)	v	Hobart Hurricanes; 117/4 (18.2 overs)	Punjab Cricket Association Stadium, Mohali; Attendance: 13,300; Umpires: Billy Bowden (NZ) and S Ravi (Ind); Player of the match: Xavier Doherty (HH)
16:00 (D/N); Scorecard	Jonathan Carter 42 (34); Xavier Doherty 4/27 (4 overs)		Shoaib Malik 39* (35); Akeal Hosein 2/25 (4 overs)	Punjab Cricket Association Stadium, Mohali; Attendance: 13,300; Umpires: Billy Bowden (NZ) and S Ravi (Ind); Player of the match: Xavier Doherty (HH)
Hobart Hurricanes won the toss and elected to field; As a result of this match, Hobart Hurricanes qualified for the semifinals and Barbados Tridents, Cape Cobras and Northern Knights were eliminated				Punjab Cricket Association Stadium, Mohali; Attendance: 13,300; Umpires: Billy Bowden (NZ) and S Ravi (Ind); Player of the match: Xavier Doherty (HH)

28 September	Cape Cobras; 135 (18.3 overs)	v	Kings XI Punjab; 139/3 (18.1 overs)	Kings XI Punjab won by 7 wickets
20:00 (D/N); Scorecard	Cape Cobras; 135 (18.3 overs)	v	Kings XI Punjab; 139/3 (18.1 overs)	Punjab Cricket Association Stadium, Mohali; Attendance: 23,798; Umpires: Billy Bowden (NZ) and Rod Tucker (Aus); Player of the match: Akshar Patel (KXIP)
20:00 (D/N); Scorecard	Richard Levi 42 (37); Akshar Patel 3/15 (4 overs)		Wriddhiman Saha 42* (35); Robin Peterson 2/19 (4 overs)	Punjab Cricket Association Stadium, Mohali; Attendance: 23,798; Umpires: Billy Bowden (NZ) and Rod Tucker (Aus); Player of the match: Akshar Patel (KXIP)
Kings XI Punjab won the toss and elected to field				Punjab Cricket Association Stadium, Mohali; Attendance: 23,798; Umpires: Billy Bowden (NZ) and Rod Tucker (Aus); Player of the match: Akshar Patel (KXIP)

30 September	Northern Knights; 135/8 (19 overs)	v	Barbados Tridents; 138/4 (18.4 overs)	Barbados Tridents won by 6 wickets (D/L method)
20:00 (D/N); Scorecard	Northern Knights; 135/8 (19 overs)	v	Barbados Tridents; 138/4 (18.4 overs)	M. Chinnaswamy Stadium, Bengaluru; Attendance: 7,614; Umpires: Billy Bowden (NZ) and S Ravi (Ind); Player of the match: James Franklin (BT)
20:00 (D/N); Scorecard	Anton Devcich 47 (47); Ravi Rampaul 3/38 (4 overs)		James Franklin 33* (25); Ish Sodhi 3/18 (4 overs)	M. Chinnaswamy Stadium, Bengaluru; Attendance: 7,614; Umpires: Billy Bowden (NZ) and S Ravi (Ind); Player of the match: James Franklin (BT)
Barbados Tridents won the toss and elected to field; Rain stopped play during the Knights innings at 11.2 overs and reduced the game to 19 overs per side. Barbados target was 138 in 19 overs as per the D/L Method				M. Chinnaswamy Stadium, Bengaluru; Attendance: 7,614; Umpires: Billy Bowden (NZ) and S Ravi (Ind); Player of the match: James Franklin (BT)

== Knockout stage ==
Semifinals
A1	Kolkata Knight Riders	141/3 (19.1 ov)
B2	Hobart Hurricanes	140/6 (20 ov)
B1	Kings XI Punjab	117 (18.2 ov)
A2	Chennai Super Kings	182/7 (20 ov)

Final
A1	Kolkata Knight Riders	180/6 (20 ov)
A2	Chennai Super Kings	185/2 (18.3 ov)

Semifinals

2 October	Hobart Hurricanes; 140/6 (20 overs)	v	Kolkata Knight Riders; 141/3 (19.1 overs)	Kolkata Knight Riders won by 7 wickets
16:00 (D/N) scorecard	Hobart Hurricanes; 140/6 (20 overs)	v	Kolkata Knight Riders; 141/3 (19.1 overs)	Rajiv Gandhi International Stadium, Hyderabad; Attendance: 41,264; Umpires: S Ravi (Ind) and Rod Tucker (Aus); Player of the match: Jacques Kallis (KKR)
16:00 (D/N) scorecard	Shoaib Malik 66* (46); Narine, Pathan, Russell 1/24 (4 overs)		Jacques Kallis 54* (40); Xavier Doherty 1/28 (4 overs)	Rajiv Gandhi International Stadium, Hyderabad; Attendance: 41,264; Umpires: S Ravi (Ind) and Rod Tucker (Aus); Player of the match: Jacques Kallis (KKR)
Hobart Hurricanes won the toss and elected to bat				Rajiv Gandhi International Stadium, Hyderabad; Attendance: 41,264; Umpires: S Ravi (Ind) and Rod Tucker (Aus); Player of the match: Jacques Kallis (KKR)

2 October	Chennai Super Kings; 182/7 (20 overs)	v	Kings XI Punjab; 117 (18.2 overs)	Chennai Super Kings won by 65 runs
20:00 (D/N) scorecard	Chennai Super Kings; 182/7 (20 overs)	v	Kings XI Punjab; 117 (18.2 overs)	Rajiv Gandhi International Stadium, Hyderabad; Attendance: 43,795; Umpires: Kumar Dharmasena (SL) and Rod Tucker (Aus); Player of the match: Dwayne Bravo (CSK)
20:00 (D/N) scorecard	Dwayne Bravo 67 (39); Parvinder Awana 4/30 (4 overs)		Akshar Patel 31 (18); Ashish Nehra 2/9 (3 overs)	Rajiv Gandhi International Stadium, Hyderabad; Attendance: 43,795; Umpires: Kumar Dharmasena (SL) and Rod Tucker (Aus); Player of the match: Dwayne Bravo (CSK)
Kings XI Punjab won the toss and elected to field				Rajiv Gandhi International Stadium, Hyderabad; Attendance: 43,795; Umpires: Kumar Dharmasena (SL) and Rod Tucker (Aus); Player of the match: Dwayne Bravo (CSK)

Final

4 October	Kolkata Knight Riders; 180/6 (20 overs)	v	Chennai Super Kings; 185/2 (18.3 overs)	Chennai Super Kings won by 8 wickets
19:00 (D/N) scorecard	Kolkata Knight Riders; 180/6 (20 overs)	v	Chennai Super Kings; 185/2 (18.3 overs)	M. Chinnaswamy Stadium, Bengaluru; Attendance: 35,800; Umpires: Kumar Dharmasena (SL) and Rod Tucker (Aus); Player of the match: Pawan Negi (CSK)
19:00 (D/N) scorecard	Gautam Gambhir 80 (52); Pawan Negi 5/22 (4 overs)		Suresh Raina 109* (62); Pat Cummins 1/32 (3 overs)	M. Chinnaswamy Stadium, Bengaluru; Attendance: 35,800; Umpires: Kumar Dharmasena (SL) and Rod Tucker (Aus); Player of the match: Pawan Negi (CSK)
Chennai Super Kings won the toss and elected to field				M. Chinnaswamy Stadium, Bengaluru; Attendance: 35,800; Umpires: Kumar Dharmasena (SL) and Rod Tucker (Aus); Player of the match: Pawan Negi (CSK)

== Statistics ==
=== Most runs ===
The following were the top five highest run scorers in the main tournament.

Player	Team	Runs
Suresh Raina	Chennai Super Kings	234
Robin Uthappa	Kolkata Knight Riders	210
Jonathan Carter	Barbados Tridents	203
Aiden Blizzard	Hobart Hurricanes	188
Shoaib Malik	Hobart Hurricanes	172

- Source: Champions league T20

=== Most wickets ===
The following were the five leading wicket-takers of the main tournament.

Player	Team	Wickets
Sunil Narine	Kolkata Knight Riders	12
Ashish Nehra	Chennai Super Kings	10
Doug Bollinger	Hobart Hurricanes	9
Parvinder Awana	Kings XI Punjab	9
Mohit Sharma	Chennai Super Kings	8

- Source: Champions League T20
