= 2014 Indian Premier League final =

- Event: 2014 Indian Premier League
Kings XI Punjab	Kolkata Knight Riders
199/4	200/7
(20 overs)	(19.3 overs)
- Kolkata Knight Riders won by 3 wickets
- Date: 1 June 2014
- Venue: M. Chinnaswamy Stadium, Bangalore
- Player of the match: Manish Pandey (KKR)
- Umpires: Kumar Dharmasena (SL); Bruce Oxenford (Aus)
- Attendance: 37,854

The 2014 Indian Premier League final was a day/night Twenty20 cricket match on 1 June 2014 at the M. Chinnaswamy Stadium, Bangalore, which was played between Kings XI Punjab and Kolkata Knight Riders to determine the winner of the 2014 season of the Indian Premier League, an annual Twenty20 cricket tournament in India.

Winning the toss, Kolkata Knight Riders elected to field first. Kings XI Punjab set up a big total of 199/4 off 20 overs for their opposition. Kolkata Knight Riders chased the total successfully with three balls to spare losing seven wickets in the process and secured their second IPL trophy.

Manish Pandey was declared the man of the match in the Final while Glenn Maxwell was declared the most valuable player of the season and Axar Patel was declared the emerging player of the season.

== Road to the final ==
=== Group stage ===
The Kings XI Punjab and the Kolkata Knight Riders were ranked first and second respectively on the league table. The Punjab had a successful first half of the league stage with six wins out of seven matches which includes their opening five consecutive wins that was finally halted by the Mumbai Indians. They also tried to back their winning form with five wins from the remaining seven matches with both the losses coming against the Kolkata and the Mumbai – second time in the group stage. Most of the wins were from their batting strength with Glenn Maxwell taking the main role and actively supported by Virender Sehwag and David Miller. Their bowlers also played a crucial role with Sandeep Sharma being their best pick for wickets and was ably supported by Axar Patel and Mitchell Johnson.

Though they won their first match against the defending champions Mumbai, the Kolkata had the worse start to the tournament registering only two wins out of seven matches in the first half of the season. But, they came back strongly in the second half winning all the remaining seven games in the group stage to confirm their spot in the play-offs. This dramatic turn-around is mostly credited to their opening batting partnership of Gautham Gambhir and Robin Uthappa who provided the perfect starts to the Kolkata batting in every match. They were also equally complemented by their bowlers with Sunil Narine being the best pick for wickets. Though they scored 170-plus only once in the tournament, with most of the wins coming from chases for the Knight Riders, this gives the picture of their bowling strength.

League progression
Team	Group matches														Playoffs		
Team	1	2	3	4	5	6	7	8	9	10	11	12	13	14	Q1/E	Q2	F
Kings XI Punjab	2	4	6	8	10	10	12	14	14	16	18	18	20	22	L	W	L
Kolkata Knight Riders	2	2	4	4	4	4	4	6	8	10	12	14	16	18	W		W

Win	Loss	No result

- Note: The total points at the end of each group match are listed.
- Note: Click on the points (group matches) or W/L (playoffs) to see the match summary.

==== Group stage series ====
26 April (D/N)
Match 15
Scorecard

Kings XI Punjab; 132/9 (20 overs)	v	Kolkata Knight Riders (H); 109 (18.2 overs)

Punjab won by 23 runs
Sheikh Zayed Stadium, Abu Dhabi

11 May (D/N)
Match 34
Scorecard

(H) Kings XI Punjab; 149/8 (20 overs)	v	Kolkata Knight Riders; 150/1 (18 overs)

Kolkata won by 9 wickets
Barabati Stadium, Cuttack

In the first group match, Punjab emerged as victorious as they extended their winning streak to four this season. On a green track with plenty of cracks, Gambhir's decision to bowl first was backed by their bowlers with Morne Morkel tormenting Kings top-order with his 145-plus kmph deliveries and also got Maxwell with a leg-stump yorker. Later, Piyush Chawla bamboozled Sehwag and benefited from long-boundaries by getting Miller and George Bailey and this helped restrict Kings XI to modest total of 132/9 in 20 overs. But, Knight Riders' openers couldn't get any momentum against Sharma and Johnson with both dismissed for single-digit scores. With Chris Lynn failing to recreate his first-match form and Yusuf Pathan still struggling in the season, they suffered a collapse with Patel and Rishi Dhawan keeping it tight for Kings XI. This helped Kings XI to win the match by 23 runs.

However, in the second group match, fortunes were reversed with Kolkata batsmen playing the aggressive role and completing the chase with nine wickets to spare, mostly thanks to third consecutive fifty from their captain, Gambhir. Earlier, Knight Riders were able to restrict Kings XI to 149 despite a swift 72 from Sehwag. At 10 overs mark, Kings XI were sitting pretty well at 85/2 but suffered a collapse in next 10 overs making only 64 and losing six wickets. Chawla was Knight Riders' pick among bowlers returning with 3/19 in four overs which includes big wickets of Sehwag and Maxwell and Narine choked the run flow at the end. The opening pair of Gambhir and Uthappa set platform for a perfect chase racing to 68 in seven overs. Though they lost Uthappa, Gambhir joined hands with Manish Pandey to build 82-run partnership and complete the chase for Knight Riders.

=== Playoff stage ===
The playoff stage was played according to the page playoff system and provided Punjab and Kolkata, being the top- and second-ranked teams, with two ways of qualifying for the Final. They first faced each other in Qualifier 1 where the winners would qualify for the Final. The losers of Qualifier 1 would play against the winners of the Eliminator in Qualifier 2, the winners of which would also qualify for the Final.

28 May (D/N)
Qualifier 1
Scorecard

(H) Kolkata Knight Riders; 163/8 (20 overs)	v	Kings XI Punjab; 135/8 (20 overs)

Kolkata won by 28 runs
Eden Gardens, Kolkata

Kolkata eased into the final with eight successive win of the season beating a listless Punjab at Eden Gardens. With the forecast of rain during the match and Duckworth-Lewis always tending to favor chasing teams, Kings XI won the toss and elected to field. Kolkata were once again provided a solid platform at the top in batting from Uthappa, who had a stellar season and Gambhir. But spin played a prominent role in the match with Patel and Karanveer Singh taking the wickets in regular intervals. Pathan and Shakib Al Hasan regulated the collapse and Kolkata were however benefited by cameos from Suryakumar Yadav and Ryan ten Doeschate who helped Kolkata reach 163/8 in 20 overs. Though Manan Vohra started solid for Kings XI, non-stop drizzle from third over wrecked Kings XI momentum as batsmen were uncertain regarding the length of the match and approach they should employ. Umesh Yadav troubled Kings XI batsmen with an opening spell of 2/12 in three overs. With Wriddhiman Saha and Miller flailed at the crease and spinners continued to strangle Kings XI batting in the middle overs which sealed the match for Knight Riders.

30 May (D/N)
Qualifier 2
Scorecard

Kings XI Punjab; 226/6 (20 overs)	v	Chennai Super Kings; 202/7 (20 overs)

Punjab won by 24 runs
Wankhede Stadium, Mumbai

Punjab innings had been lit up by the century from Sehwag who steadily gathered the form with IPL coming to the end and helped Kings XI defeat Chennai Super Kings to reach the finals. With Super Kings bowlers feeding him a juicy full-tosses, Sehwag raced along at a strike-rate of 200, outshining all his teammates. He was only stopped by a difficult diving effort from Faf du Plessis but it was too late as Kings XI scored 226/6 in 20 overs. But Suresh Raina started making a chase of 227 look absurdly simple reaching his fifty in 16 balls and going for 33 runs in sixth over off Parvinder Awana for Super Kings to reach 100/2, highest ever Powerplay score in T20 match. But, Raina innings was stopped through smart fielding off Bailey who caused run-out to depart Raina on 87 off 25 balls. Some tight bowling by Kings XI helped them win the match as Super Kings could only score 102 off last 14 overs as even M. S. Dhoni couldn't prevent the defeat by 24 runs.

== Match ==
=== Background ===
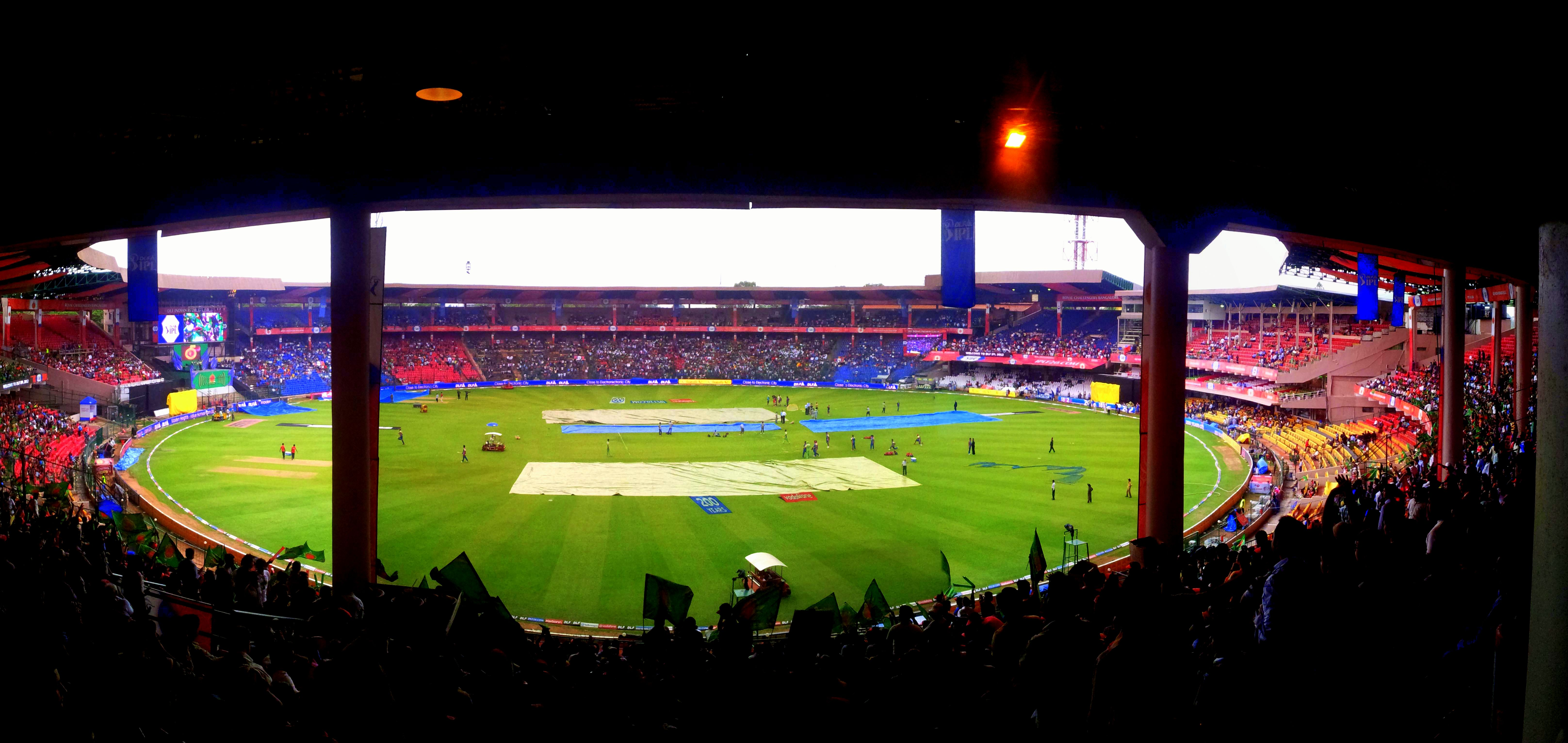
M. Chinnaswamy Stadium in Bengaluru hosted 2014 IPL Final

The Final was played at the neutral venue of M. Chinnaswamy Stadium, Bengaluru. Though Final was initially scheduled to be at Mumbai since the Mumbai Indians won the trophy in 2013, play-off matches including Final were rescheduled with Final shifted to Bengaluru due to the unresolved stadium issues over hosting play-off matches in Chennai between Tamil Nadu Cricket Association and local municipal corporation. This was their first encounter between these two teams in the knockout/playoff stage of IPL.

Kolkata had the tournament's leading run-getter Robin Uthappa in their ranks and their leading wicket-taker, Sunil Narine was two wickets behind Mohit Sharma on Purple Cap list. Punjab has best batting performance in the season with their leading run-scorer Glenn Maxwell being the third highest run-getter in the season with 103 runs behind the Orange Cap holder.

=== Report ===
Kolkata Knight Riders defeated Kings XI Punjab by 3 wickets to win the 2014 Indian Premier League in a high intensity final match, which was played in flawless spirit between the top two teams. The defining knock of Manish Pandey ensured Knight Riders' victory and helped them lift their second Indian Premier League trophy in three years.

Earlier, the Knight Riders won the toss and elected to field. The Kings XI start was not encouraging with Virender Sehwag falling to the extra pace of Umesh Yadav and the promotion of George Bailey to No.3 lasting just two balls. Kings XI made only 32 runs in Powerplay, their lowest in the entire season and also scored only 58 off ten overs. But their innings took a dramatic turn with Wriddhiman Saha and Manan Vohra orchestrating a jaw-dropping turnaround in tempo. Both reached their fifties with Saha needing only 29 balls; they added 129 runs in twelve overs. Though Vohra got out in the 17th over off Piyush Chawla, Saha continued his onslaught to reach his century off 49 balls with a six off Narine and hence finishing the innings with an unbeaten knock of 115 off 55 balls. Saha's century was the first ever century in an IPL final. This helped the Kings XI reach 199/4 in 20 overs with 141 runs coming off last ten overs.

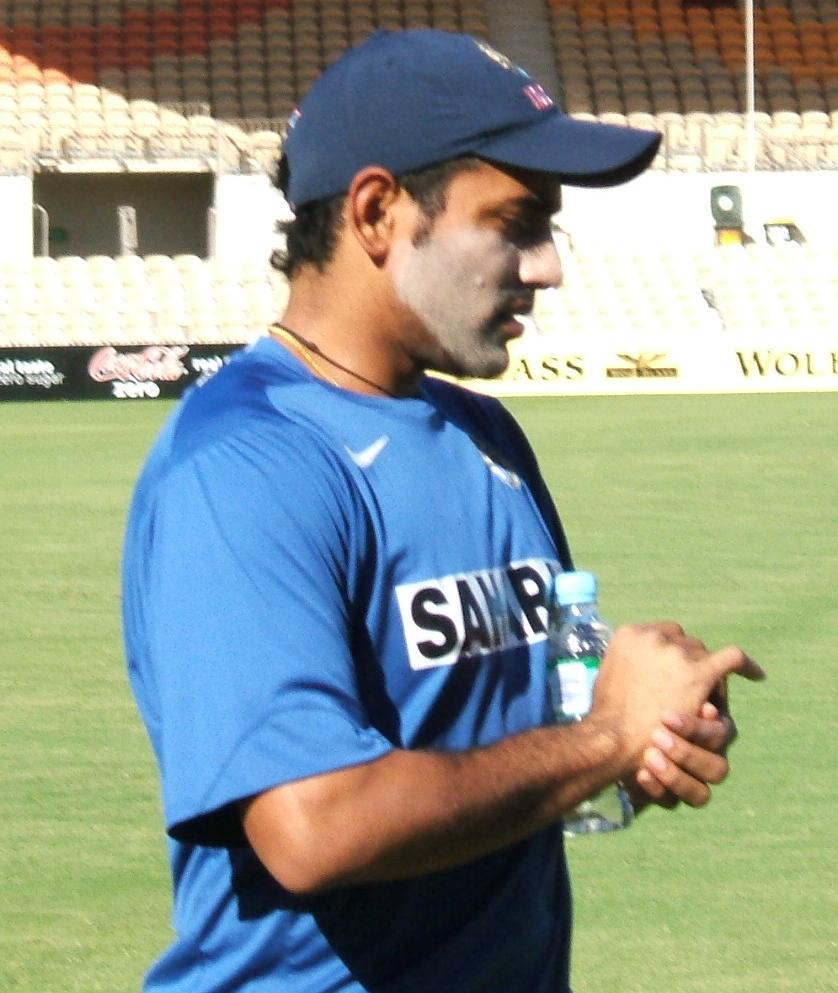
Robin Uthappa of KKR won Orange Cap for 2014 IPL

The Knight Riders lost Uthappa early to Mitchell Johnson but Pandey lead the way for the Knight Riders to pull off the highest successful run chase in any T20 final. With Pandey's 94 off 50 balls, an innings fuelled by an urgency that did not abate, the Knight Riders did not fall far behind the asking rate during their chase of a daunting target. Pandey and Gautham Gambhir placed several drives through the infield and with some excellent running between the wickets, they built a 53-run stand for the second wicket, which did not consist of a single six. With Gambhir holing out to Karanveer Singh, Yusuf Pathan came to the crease to start the flow of sixes in the Knight Riders' innings as he punished Singh and Lakshmipathy Balaji. Pandey also came into the party tearing into Parvinder Awana's shoddy lengths. Though Axar Patel tried to dry up the runs on one end, this didn't reduce the run flow as both added 71 off 43 balls. Though they suffered a mini-collapse with Singh removing Pandey, Pathan and Ryan ten Doeschate and Shakib Al Hasan losing his wicket to some incredible fielding from Bailey, Chawla held his nerve to thwart the spirited Kings XI campaign by pulling a six off Johnson in last ball of the penultimate over and finally scoring the winning boundary in the third ball of the last over; thus driving the Knights to their second title.

=== Summary ===
It was Knight Riders' second IPL title, making them the second team after Chennai Super Kings to have won the IPL title more than once. Manish Pandey was awarded player of the match for his 94 off 50 balls. With 660 runs in the tournament, Robin Uthappa finished as the leading run-scorer and won the Orange Cap. Glenn Maxwell won the Maximum Sixes Award for his 36 sixes in 16 matches. He was also adjudged as Most Valuable Player of the season. Axar Patel won the Emerging Player of the year award.

== Scorecard ==
- On-field umpires: Kumar Dharmasena (SL) and Bruce Oxenford (Aus)
- Third umpire: Sundaram Ravi (Ind)
- Reserve umpire: C. K. Nandan (Ind)
- Match referee: Roshan Mahanama (SL)
- Toss: Kolkata Knight Riders elected to field first
- Result: Kolkata Knight Riders won by three wickets
- League impact: Kolkata Knight Riders won the 2014 Indian Premier League

Kings XI Punjab batting innings
Batsman	Method of dismissal	Runs	Balls	4s	6s	Strike rate
Virender Sehwag	c Gambhir b UT Yadav	7	10	1	0	70.00
Manan Vohra	c & b Chawla	67	52	6	2	128.84
George Bailey *	b Narine	1	2	0	0	50.00
Wriddhiman Saha †	not out	115	55	10	8	209.09
Glenn Maxwell	c Morkel b Chawla	0	1	0	0	0.00
David Miller	not out	1	1	0	0	100.00
Axar Patel	did not bat	–	–	–	–	–
Mitchell Johnson	did not bat	–	–	–	–	–
Lakshmipathy Balaji	did not bat	–	–	–	–	–
Karanveer Singh	did not bat	–	–	–	–	–
Parvinder Awana	did not bat	–	–	–	–	–
Extras	(lb 4, nb 1, wd 3)	8				
Total	(20 overs)	199/4	RR: 9.95			

Fall of wickets: 1–23 (Sehwag, 3.4 ov), 2–30 (Bailey, 5.1 ov), 3–159 (Vohra, 17.1 ov), 4–170 (Maxwell, 17.6 ov)

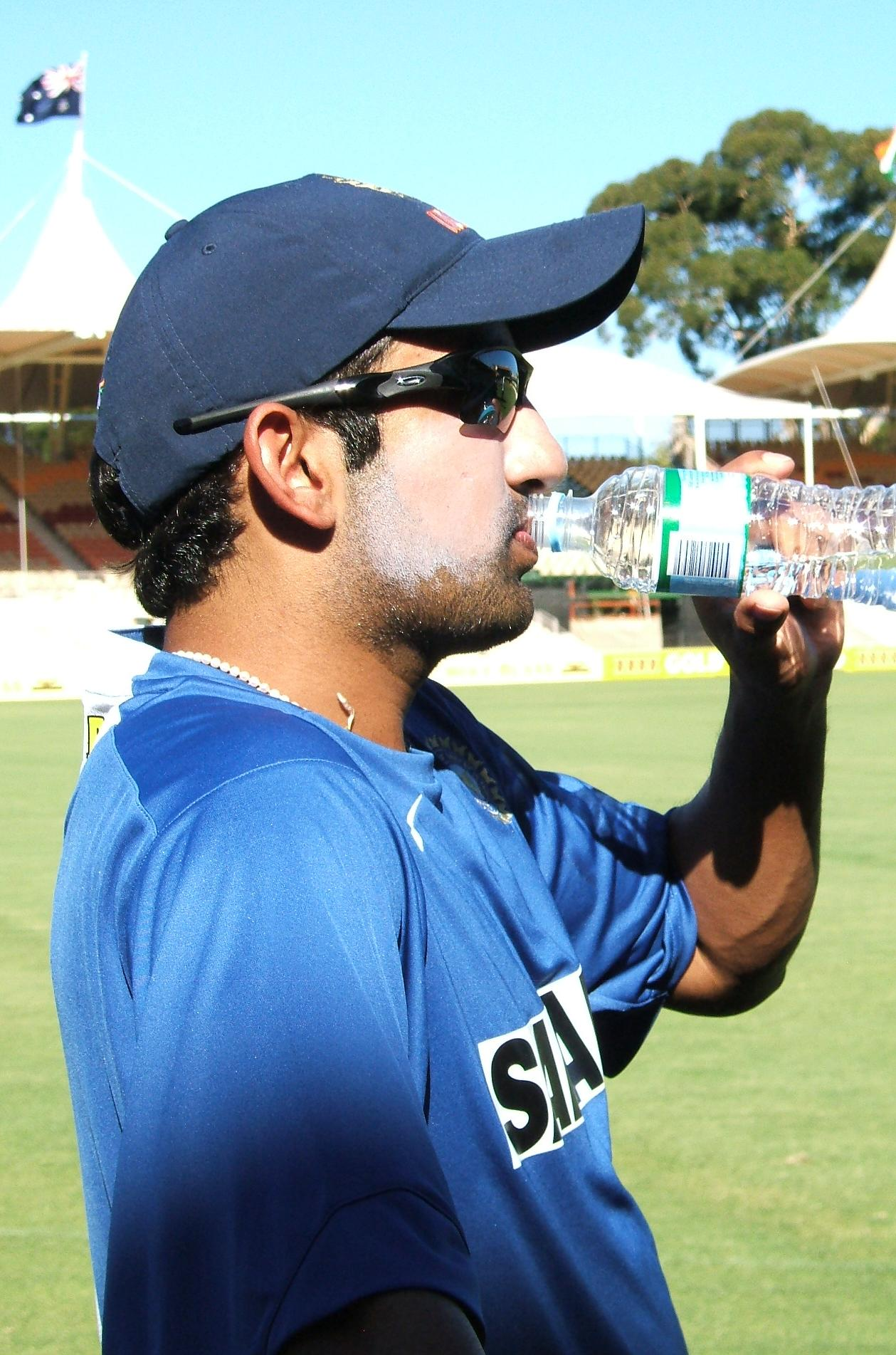
Gautam Gambhir won his second IPL title as captain for the KKR

Kolkata Knight Riders bowling
Bowler	Overs	Maidens	Runs	Wickets	Economy	0s	4s	6s	WD	NB
Morne Morkel	4	0	40	0	10.00	9	3	2	0	0
Umesh Yadav	4	0	39	1	9.75	10	5	1	1	0
Sunil Narine	4	0	46	1	11.50	10	5	3	0	1
Shakib Al Hasan	4	0	26	0	6.50	8	1	1	0	0
Piyush Chawla	4	0	44	2	11.00	7	3	3	0	0

Kolkata Knight Riders batting innings
Batsman	Method of dismissal	Runs	Balls	4s	6s	Strike rate
Robin Uthappa †	c Patel b Johnson	5	3	1	0	166.66
Gautam Gambhir *	c Miller b Singh	23	17	3	0	135.29
Manish Pandey	c Bailey b Singh	94	50	7	6	188.00
Yusuf Pathan	c Maxwell b Singh	36	22	0	4	163.63
Shakib Al Hasan	run out (Bailey)	12	7	2	0	171.42
Ryan ten Doeschate	c Miller b Singh	4	3	1	0	133.33
Suryakumar Yadav	c Vohra b Johnson	5	6	0	0	83.33
Piyush Chawla	not out	13	5	1	1	260.00
Sunil Narine	not out	2	4	0	0	50.00
Morne Morkel	did not bat	–	–	–	–	–
Umesh Yadav	did not bat	–	–	–	–	–
Extras	(wd 6)	6				
Totals	(19.3 overs)	200/7	RR: 10.25			

Fall of wickets: 1–6 (Uthappa, 0.4 ov), 2–59 (Gambhir, 6.1 ov), 3–130 (Pathan, 13.3 ov), 4–156 (Shakib, 15.3 ov), 5–168 (ten Doeschate, 16.3 ov), 6–179 (Pandey, 16.6 ov), 7–187 (SA Yadav, 18.2 ov)

Kings XI Punjab bowling
Bowler	Overs	Maidens	Runs	Wickets	Economy	0s	4s	6s	WD	NB
Mitchell Johnson	4	0	41	2	10.25	8	5	1	2	0
Lakshmipathy Balaji	4	0	41	0	10.25	6	3	2	0	0
Parvinder Awana	3.3	0	43	0	12.28	3	3	2	0	0
Karanveer Singh	4	0	54	4	13.50	9	2	6	3	0
Axar Patel	4	0	21	0	5.25	10	2	0	1	0

Source :

Scorecard on ESPNcricinfo

Key

- * – Captain
- † – Wicket-keeper
- c Fielder – the batsman was dismissed by a catch by the named fielder
- b Bowler – the bowler who gains credit for the dismissal
- lbw – the batsman was dismissed leg before wicket
- Total runs are in the format: score/wickets
- b – Bye, lb – Leg bye, nb – No-ball, wd – Wide, RR – Run rate
