= 2014 Champions League Twenty20 squads =

This is a list of the squads that qualified for the 2014 Champions League Twenty20.

Note: Players with international caps are listed in bold.

== Barbados Tridents ==
Coach: (Barbados) Vasbert Drakes

No.	Player	Nat	Date of birth	Batting	Bowling style
51	**Rayad Emrit** (c)	(Trinidad and Tobago)	8 March 1981 (aged 33)	Right	Right-arm medium-fast
78	**Jonathan Carter**	(Barbados)	16 November 1987 (aged 26)	Left	Right-arm medium
47	**Elton Chigumbura**	(Zimbabwe)	14 March 1986 (aged 28)	Right	Right-arm medium
91	**Shane Dowrich** (wk)	(Barbados)	30 October 1991 (aged 22)	Right	—
7	**James Franklin**	(New Zealand)	7 November 1980 (aged 33)	Left	Left-arm medium
98	**Jason Holder**	(Barbados)	5 November 1991 (aged 22)	Right	Right-arm medium-fast
21	Akeal Hosein	(Trinidad and Tobago)	23 April 1993 (aged 21)	Left	Slow left-arm orthodox
71	Kyle Mayers	(Barbados)	8 September 1992 (aged 22)	Left	Right-arm medium
44	**Neil McKenzie**	(South Africa)	24 November 1975 (aged 38)	Right	Right-arm medium
9	**Jeevan Mendis**	(Sri Lanka)	15 January 1983 (aged 31)	Left	Right-arm leg break
23	**Dilshan Munaweera**	(Sri Lanka)	24 April 1989 (aged 25)	Right	Right-arm off break
5	**Ashley Nurse**	(Barbados)	22 December 1988 (aged 25)	Right	Right-arm off break
40	**William Perkins** (wk)	(Trinidad and Tobago)	8 October 1986 (aged 27)	Right	—
14	**Ravi Rampaul**	(Trinidad and Tobago)	15 October 1984 (aged 29)	Left	Right-arm fast-medium
1	Raymon Reifer	(Barbados)	11 May 1991 (aged 23)	Left	Left-arm medium-fast

== Cape Cobras ==
Coach: (South Africa) Paul Adams

No.	Player	Nat	Date of birth	Batting	Bowling style
14	**Justin Ontong** (c)	(South Africa)	4 January 1980 (aged 34)	Right	Right-arm off break
1	**Hashim Amla**	(South Africa)	31 March 1983 (aged 31)	Right	Right-arm off break
21	**JP Duminy**	(South Africa)	14 April 1984 (aged 30)	Left	Right-arm off break
25	Sybrand Engelbrecht	(South Africa)	15 September 1988 (aged 25)	Right	Right-arm off break
6	**Justin Kemp**	(South Africa)	2 October 1977 (aged 36)	Right	Right-arm medium-fast
9	**Rory Kleinveldt**	(South Africa)	15 March 1983 (aged 31)	Right	Right-arm medium-fast
67	**Charl Langeveldt**	(South Africa)	17 December 1974 (aged 39)	Right	Right-arm fast-medium
88	**Richard Levi**	(South Africa)	14 January 1988 (aged 26)	Right	Right-arm medium
60	Aviwe Mgijima	(South Africa)	10 August 1988 (aged 26)	Right	Right-arm fast-medium
13	**Robin Peterson**	(South Africa)	4 August 1979 (aged 35)	Left	Slow left-arm orthodox
24	**Vernon Philander**	(South Africa)	24 June 1985 (aged 29)	Right	Right-arm medium-fast
	**Dane Piedt**	(South Africa)	6 March 1990 (aged 24)	Right	Right-arm off break
55	Zakhele Qwabe	(South Africa)	25 May 1988 (aged 26)	Right	Right-arm medium-fast
64	Omphile Ramela	(South Africa)	14 March 1988 (aged 26)	Left	Slow left-arm orthodox
74	**Stiaan van Zyl**	(South Africa)	19 September 1987 (aged 26)	Left	Right-arm medium
26	**Dane Vilas** (wk)	(South Africa)	10 June 1985 (aged 29)	Right	—

== Chennai Super Kings ==
Coach: (New Zealand) Stephen Fleming

No.	Player	Nat	Date of birth	Batting	Bowling style
7	**Mahendra Singh Dhoni** (c & wk)	(India)	7 July 1981 (aged 33)	Right	Right-arm medium
99	**Ravichandran Ashwin**	(India)	17 September 1986 (aged 27)	Right	Right-arm off break
77	**Samuel Badree**	(Trinidad and Tobago)	9 March 1981 (aged 33)	Right	Right-arm leg break
47	**Dwayne Bravo**	(Trinidad and Tobago)	7 October 1983 (aged 30)	Right	Right-arm medium-fast
13	**Faf du Plessis**	(South Africa)	13 July 1984 (aged 30)	Right	Right-arm leg break
11	**John Hastings**	(Australia)	4 November 1985 (aged 28)	Right	Right-arm medium-fast
8	**Ravindra Jadeja**	(India)	6 December 1988 (aged 25)	Left	Slow left arm orthodox
12	Mithun Manhas	(India)	12 October 1979 (aged 34)	Right	Right-arm off break
42	**Brendon McCullum** (wk)	(New Zealand)	27 September 1981 (aged 32)	Right	Right-arm medium
6	Pawan Negi	(India)	6 January 1993 (aged 21)	Left	Slow left arm orthodox
64	**Ashish Nehra**	(India)	30 April 1979 (aged 35)	Right	Left-arm medium-fast
15	Ishwar Pandey	(India)	15 August 1989 (aged 25)	Right	Right-arm medium-fast
3	**Suresh Raina**	(India)	27 November 1986 (aged 27)	Left	Right-arm off break
18	**Mohit Sharma**	(India)	18 September 1988 (aged 25)	Right	Right-arm medium-fast
50	**Dwayne Smith**	(Barbados)	12 April 1983 (aged 31)	Right	Right-arm medium

== Dolphins ==
Coach: (South Africa) Lance Klusener

No.	Player	Nat	Date of birth	Batting	Bowling style
50	**Morne van Wyk** (c & wk)	(South Africa)	20 March 1979 (aged 35)	Right	Slow left-arm orthodox
87	**Kyle Abbott**	(South Africa)	18 June 1987 (age 37)	Right	Right-arm medium
31	Craig Alexander	(South Africa)	18 February 1990 (age 35)	Right	Right-arm medium
20	Cody Chetty	(South Africa)	28 June 1991 (age 33)	Right	Right arm off break
12	Cameron Delport	(South Africa)	12 May 1989 (age 35)	Left	Right arm medium-fast
	Daryn Dupavillon	(South Africa)	15 July 1994 (age 30)	Right	Right arm fast
84	Robbie Frylinck	(South Africa)	27 September 1984 (age 40)	Right-handed	Right arm fast-medium
16	**Keshav Maharaj**	(South Africa)	7 February 1990 (age 35)	Right	Slow left-arm orthodox
	Sibonelo Makhanya	(South Africa)	7 March 1996 (age 29)	Right	Right arm medium-fast
18	**Andile Phehlukwayo**	(South Africa)	3 March 1996 (age 29)	Right	Right arm fast
28	Daryn Smit (wk)	(South Africa)	25 February 1985 (age 40)	Right	Right-arm leg break
13	Prenelan Subrayen	(South Africa)	23 September 1993 (age 31)	Right	Right-arm off break
97	Jonathan Vandiar	(South Africa)	25 April 1990 (age 34)	Left	Right arm leg break
4	**Vaughn van Jaarsveld**	(South Africa)	2 February 1985 (age 40)	Left	Right arm medium
73	Khaya Zondo	(South Africa)	7 March 1990 (age 35)	Right	Right arm off break

== Hobart Hurricanes ==
Coach: (Australia) Damien Wright

No.	Player	Nat	Date of birth	Batting	Bowling style
27	**Tim Paine** (c & wk)	(Australia)	8 December 1984 (age 40)	Right	Right arm medium
81	**Travis Birt**	(Australia)	9 December 1981 (age 43)	Left	Right arm medium
6	Aiden Blizzard	(Australia)	27 July 1984 (age 40)	Left	Left arm medium
11	**Doug Bollinger**	(Australia)	24 July 1981 (age 43)	Left	Left arm fast medium
13	**Cameron Boyce**	(Australia)	27 July 1989 (age 35)	Right	Right arm leg spin
24	**Xavier Doherty**	(Australia)	22 November 1982 (age 42)	Left	Left arm orthodox
51	**Ben Dunk** (wk)	(Australia)	11 March 1987 (age 38)	Left
4	Evan Gulbis	(Australia)	26 March 1986 (age 38)	Right	Right arm fast medium
16	**Ben Hilfenhaus**	(Australia)	15 March 1983 (age 42)	Right	Right arm fast medium
55	**Ben Laughlin**	(Australia)	3 October 1982 (age 42)	Right	Right arm fast medium
15	**Joe Mennie**	(Australia)	24 December 1988 (age 36)	Right	Right arm fast medium
69	Dom Michael	(Australia)	8 October 1987 (age 37)	Left	Right arm fast medium
	Sam Rainbird	(Australia)	5 June 1992 (age 32)	Right	Left arm fast medium
77	**Shoaib Malik**	(Pakistan)	1 February 1982 (age 43)	Right	Left arm fast medium
9	Jonathan Wells	(Australia)	13 August 1988 (age 36)	Right	Right arm medium

== Kings XI Punjab ==
Coach: (India) Sanjay Bangar

No.	Player	Nat	Date of birth	Batting	Bowling style
2	**George Bailey** (c)	(Australia)	7 September 1982 (aged 32)	Right	Right-arm medium
88	Anureet Singh	(India)	2 March 1988 (aged 26)	Right	Right-arm medium-fast
34	**Parvinder Awana**	(India)	19 June 1986 (aged 28)	Right	Right-arm medium-fast
55	**Lakshmipathy Balaji**	(India)	27 September 1981 (aged 32)	Right	Right-arm medium-fast
19	**Rishi Dhawan**	(India)	19 February 1990 (aged 24)	Right	Right-arm medium-fast
25	**Mitchell Johnson**	(Australia)	2 November 1981 (aged 32)	Left	Left-arm fast
22	Karanveer Singh	(India)	8 November 1987 (aged 26)	Right	Right-arm leg break googly
17	**Mandeep Singh**	(India)	18 December 1991 (aged 22)	Right	Right-arm medium
32	**Glenn Maxwell**	(Australia)	14 October 1988 (aged 25)	Right	Right-arm off break
10	**David Miller**	(South Africa)	10 June 1989 (aged 25)	Left	Right-arm off break
20	**Akshar Patel**	(India)	20 January 1994 (aged 20)	Left	Slow left arm orthodox
1	**Thisara Perera**	(Sri Lanka)	3 April 1989 (aged 25)	Left	Right-arm medium-fast
6	**Wriddhiman Saha** (wk)	(India)	24 October 1984 (aged 29)	Right	—
18	**Virender Sehwag**	(India)	10 August 1978 (aged 36)	Right	Right-arm off break
54	Manan Vohra	(India)	18 July 1993 (aged 21)	Right	Right-arm medium

== Kolkata Knight Riders ==
Coach: (South Africa) Trevor Bayliss

No.	Player	Nat	Date of birth	Batting	Bowling style
23	**Gautam Gambhir** (c)	(India)	14 October 1981 (aged 32)	Left	Right-arm leg break
36	Manvinder Bisla (wk)	(India)	27 December 1984 (aged 29)	Right	—
21	**Piyush Chawla**	(India)	24 December 1988 (aged 25)	Left	Right-arm leg break
30	**Pat Cummins**	(Australia)	8 May 1993 (aged 21)	Right	Right-arm fast
3	**Jacques Kallis**	(South Africa)	16 October 1975 (aged 38)	Right	Right-arm medium-fast
	**Vinay Kumar**	(India)	12 February 1984 (aged 30)	Right	Right-arm medium-fast
74	**Sunil Narine**	(Trinidad and Tobago)	26 May 1988 (aged 26)	Left	Right-arm off break
1	Manish Pandey	(India)	10 September 1989 (aged 25)	Right	Right-arm off break
24	**Yusuf Pathan**	(India)	17 November 1982 (aged 31)	Right	Right-arm off break
12	**Andre Russell**	(Jamaica)	29 April 1988 (aged 26)	Right	Right-arm fast-medium
27	**Ryan ten Doeschate**	(Netherlands)	30 June 1980 (aged 34)	Right	Right-arm medium-fast
37	**Robin Uthappa** (wk)	(India)	11 September 1985 (aged 29)	Right	Right-arm medium
18	Kuldeep Yadav	(India)	14 December 1994 (aged 19)	Left	Slow left-arm wrist-spin
212	Suryakumar Yadav	(India)	14 September 1990 (aged 23)	Right	Right-arm medium
19	**Umesh Yadav**	(India)	25 October 1987 (aged 26)	Right	Right-arm fast

== Lahore Lions ==
Coach: (Pakistan) Mohsin Kamal

No.	Player	Nat	Date of birth	Batting	Bowling style
8	**Mohammad Hafeez** (c)	(Pakistan)	17 October 1980 (aged 33)	Right	Right-arm off break
14	Adnan Rasool	(Pakistan)	1 May 1981 (aged 33)	Right	Right-arm off break
18	Agha Salman	(Pakistan)	23 November 1993 (aged 20)	Right	Right-arm off break
19	**Ahmed Shehzad**	(Pakistan)	23 November 1991 (aged 22)	Right	Right-arm leg break
74	**Aizaz Cheema**	(Pakistan)	5 September 1979 (aged 35)	Right	Right-arm medium-fast
	Ali Manzoor	(Pakistan)	8 January 1991 (aged 23)	Right	Slow left-arm orthodox
12	Asif Raza	(Pakistan)	11 January 1987 (aged 27)	Left	Right-arm fast-medium
	Imran Ali	(Pakistan)	21 October 1980 (aged 33)	Right	Right-arm fast-medium
9	Mohammad Saeed	(Pakistan)	12 October 1983 (aged 30)	Right	Right-arm fast-medium
11	Mustafa Iqbal	(Pakistan)	30 August 1989 (aged 25)	Left	Slow left-arm orthodox
77	**Nasir Jamshed**	(Pakistan)	6 December 1989 (aged 24)	Left	—
10	Saad Nasim	(Pakistan)	29 April 1990 (aged 24)	Right	Right-arm leg break
96	**Umar Akmal** (wk)	(Pakistan)	26 May 1990 (aged 24)	Right	—
6	Umar Siddiq	(Pakistan)	30 December 1992 (aged 21)	Left	Right-arm off break
47	**Wahab Riaz**	(Pakistan)	28 June 1985 (aged 29)	Right	Left-arm fast

== Mumbai Indians ==
Coach: (New Zealand) John Wright

No.	Player	Nat	Date of birth	Batting	Bowling style
55	**Kieron Pollard**	(Trinidad and Tobago)	12 May 1987 (aged 27)	Right	Right-arm medium-fast
78	**Corey Anderson**	(New Zealand)	13 December 1990 (aged 23)	Left	Left-arm medium-fast
12	Jasprit Bumrah	(India)	6 December 1993 (aged 20)	Right	Right-arm medium-fast
90	**Marchant de Lange**	(South Africa)	13 October 1990 (aged 23)	Right	Right-arm fast
19	Shreyas Gopal	(India)	4 September 1993 (aged 21)	Right	Right-arm leg break
3	**Harbhajan Singh** (c)	(India)	3 July 1980 (aged 34)	Right	Right-arm off break
48	**Michael Hussey**	(Australia)	27 May 1975 (aged 39)	Left	Right-arm medium
88	**Praveen Kumar**	(India)	2 October 1986 (aged 27)	Right	Right-arm medium-fast
99	**Lasith Malinga**	(Sri Lanka)	28 August 1983 (aged 31)	Right	Right-arm fast
7	Sushant Marathe (wk)	(India)	16 October 1985 (aged 28)	Left	Right-arm leg break
30	**Pragyan Ojha**	(India)	5 September 1986 (aged 28)	Left	Slow left arm orthodox
9	**Ambati Rayudu**	(India)	23 September 1985 (aged 28)	Right	Right-arm off break
111	Jalaj Saxena	(India)	15 December 1986 (aged 27)	Right	Right-arm off break
54	**Lendl Simmons**	(Trinidad and Tobago)	25 January 1985 (aged 29)	Right	Right-arm medium
27	Aditya Tare (wk)	(India)	7 November 1987 (aged 26)	Right	—

== Northern Districts ==
Coach: (New Zealand) James Pamment

No.	Player	Nat	Date of birth	Batting	Bowling style
9	**Daniel Flynn** (c)	(New Zealand)	16 April 1985 (age 39)	Left	Slow left-arm wrist-spin
	**Graeme Aldridge**	(New Zealand)	15 November 1977 (age 47)	Right	Right arm fast-medium
1	Jono Boult	(New Zealand)	29 November 1985 (age 39)	Left	Right arm off break
20	**Trent Boult**	(New Zealand)	22 July 1989 (age 35)	Right	Left arm medium-fast
13	**Anton Devcich**	(New Zealand)	28 September 1985 (age 39)	Left	Slow left-arm orthodox
29	Daniel Harris	(Australia)	31 December 1979 (age 45)	Right	Right arm medium
44	Scott Kuggeleijn	(New Zealand)	3 January 1992 (age 33)	Right	Right arm fast-medium
47	Daryl Mitchell	(New Zealand)	20 May 1991 (age 33)	Right	Right arm medium
33	Mitchell Santner	(New Zealand)	12 February 1992 (age 33)	Left	Slow left-arm orthodox
17	**Ish Sodhi**	(New Zealand)	31 October 1992 (age 32)	Right	Right arm leg break
16	**Tim Southee**	(New Zealand)	11 December 1988 (age 36)	Right	Right arm medium-fast
56	**Scott Styris**	(New Zealand)	10 July 1975 (age 49)	Right	Right arm medium
11	**BJ Watling** (wk)	(New Zealand)	9 July 1985 (age 39)	Right	—
7	**Kane Williamson**	(New Zealand)	8 August 1990 (age 34)	Right	Right arm off break
3	Brad Wilson	(New Zealand)	10 April 1985 (age 39)	Right	Right arm off break

== Perth Scorchers ==
Coach: (Australia) Justin Langer

No.	Player	Nat	Date of birth	Batting	Bowling style
32	**Adam Voges** (c)	(Australia)	4 October 1979 (aged 34)	Right	Slow left arm orthodox
18	**Ashton Agar**	(Australia)	14 October 1993 (aged 20)	Left	Slow left arm orthodox
4	Cam Bancroft (wk)	(Australia)	19 November 1992 (aged 21)	Right	—
19	**Michael Beer**	(Australia)	9 June 1984 (aged 30)	Right	Slow left arm orthodox
5	Jason Behrendorff	(Australia)	20 April 1990 (aged 24)	Right	Left-arm fast-medium
35	Hilton Cartwright	(Australia)	4 February 1992 (aged 22)	Right	Right-arm medium
13	**Nathan Coulter-Nile**	(Australia)	11 October 1987 (aged 26)	Right	Right-arm fast
31	**Brad Hogg**	(Australia)	6 February 1971 (aged 43)	Left	Slow left-arm wrist-spin
	Simon Mackin	(Australia)	1 September 1992 (aged 22)	Right	Right-arm fast-medium
10	**Mitchell Marsh**	(Australia)	20 October 1991 (aged 22)	Right	Right-arm medium
3	Joel Paris	(Australia)	11 December 1992 (aged 21)	Left	Left-arm fast-medium
50	Craig Simmons	(Australia)	1 December 1982 (aged 31)	Left	Slow left arm orthodox
17	Ashton Turner	(Australia)	25 January 1993 (aged 21)	Right	Right-arm off break
9	Sam Whiteman (wk)	(Australia)	19 March 1992 (aged 22)	Left	—
99	**Yasir Arafat**	(Pakistan)	12 March 1982 (aged 32)	Right	Right-arm fast-medium

== Southern Express T20 ==
Coach: (Sri Lanka) Upul Chandana

No.	Player	Nat	Date of birth	Batting	Bowling style
42	**Jehan Mubarak** (c)	(Sri Lanka)	10 January 1981 (aged 33)	Left	Right-arm off break
	**Niroshan Dickwella** (wk)	(Sri Lanka)	23 June 1993 (aged 21)	Left	—
70	Danushka Gunathilaka	(Sri Lanka)	17 March 1991 (aged 23)	Left	Right-arm off break
96	Charith Jayampathi	(Sri Lanka)	1 February 1991 (aged 23)	Left	Left-arm medium-fast
	Ishan Jayaratne	(Sri Lanka)	26 June 1989 (aged 25)	Right	Right-arm fast-medium
	Yashodha Lanka	(Sri Lanka)	1 October 1992 (aged 21)	Right	Left-arm medium-fast
	Kasun Madushanka	(Sri Lanka)	16 July 1991 (aged 23)	Right	Right-arm fast-medium
28	**Farveez Maharoof**	(Sri Lanka)	7 September 1984 (aged 30)	Right	Right-arm medium-fast
10	Sachith Pathirana	(Sri Lanka)	21 March 1989 (aged 25)	Left	Slow left arm orthodox
5	**Angelo Perera**	(Sri Lanka)	23 February 1990 (aged 24)	Right	Slow left arm orthodox
47	**Dilruwan Perera**	(Sri Lanka)	22 July 1982 (aged 32)	Right	Right-arm off break
8	**Kusal Perera** (wk)	(Sri Lanka)	17 August 1990 (aged 24)	Left	—
41	**Seekkuge Prasanna**	(Sri Lanka)	27 June 1985 (aged 29)	Right	Right-arm leg break
58	Lakshan Rangika	(Sri Lanka)	10 June 1991 (aged 23)	Right	Slow left-arm wrist-spin
21	Tillakaratne Sampath	(Sri Lanka)	23 June 1982 (aged 32)	Right	Right-arm off break
