= Mehram Serai =

Mehram ki Sarai
- Interactive map of Mehram ki Sarai
- Location: Mehram nagar, Delhi, India
- Coordinates: 28°33′53″N 77°7′8″E
- Type: Caravanserai
- Completion date: 1639 CE

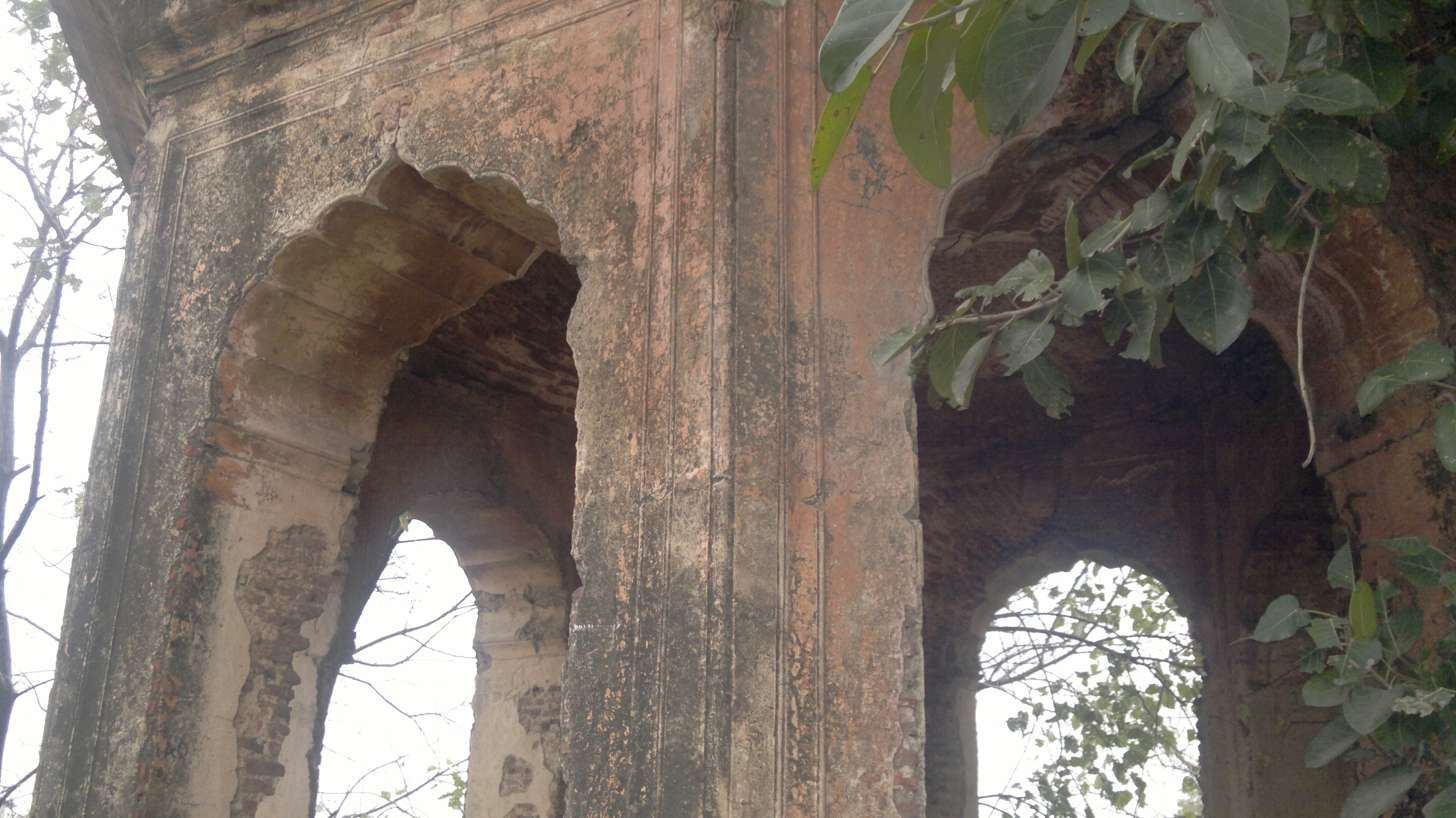
Ruins of pavilion at Mehram nagar near IGI Terminal-1.

Mehram ki Serai is a 17th-century caravanserai listed as a protected monument by the ASI, located on the land owned by the Ministry of Defence in the north-east corner of IGI airport. It was built by Mehram Khan, a eunuch and keeper of Jahangir's harem.

== Etymology ==
The name can be translated as "Inn of Mehram". The term Mahram itself means unmarriageable kin with whom marriage or sexual intercourse would be considered haram (illegal in Islam) or people from whom purdah is not obligatory or legal escorts of a woman during journey longer than a day and night (24 hours). In this context Mehram meant the eunuch named "Mehram Khan", a close escort and confidant who can freely talk and meet with women in king's harem.

== History ==
According to the convener of INTACH Delhi, Swapna Liddle, the Mehram Ki Serai caravanserai for the comfort of travelers and eponymous Mehram Bazaar were built by a eunuch, Mehram Khan, who was an incharge of mughal harem during the reign of Jahangir. It was built at a distance of 7 kos (22.4 km) from the mughal city. Mehram nagar village, that later came up near it, has a double-storey pointed-arch vaulted gateway with large wooden door.

In 1622 CE Shah Jahan (known as prince Khurram at that time) raised an army with the support of Mahabat Khan and marched against his own father emperor Jahangir and mother Nur Jahan. Mehram Khan, Fidai Khan, Motamid Khan (official court chronicler) and Kheleel Beg, were apprehended based on the evidence of Mirza Rustam and one more witness, after being accused of holding a secret correspondence with rebellious Shah Jehan. Those two witnesses were executed by Fidai Khan, and Mehram Khan was absolve of any wrongdoing by Fidai Khan. Later in 1639 CE, Mehram Khan built the serai and bazaar, both named after himself.

== Architecture ==
The caravanserai, with chhatris above and octagonal vaulted cambers below on four corners, is built of rubble masonry and mughal lakhori bricks. The complex also has a baradari (open doors pavilion with 12 doors, 3 in each direction), 2 wells, an enclosure wall with 3 gateways, garden in the enclosure and a water channel coursing through the middle of the enclosure.

== Conservation ==
By 2016, the dilapidated monument had been severely vandalised, two out of original four chattris and only one out of 3 original gates of enclosure survived, enclosure wall was broken at several places, both the wells had dried up, water channels was mostly buried under rubble, garden was overgrown with shrubs.

In 2016 Government of Delhi's Department of Archaeology in collaboration with INTACH commenced the conservation, one of the 2 missing gateway was rebuilt, both wells and parts of the water channel were restored. With 40% work completed, it came to a halt in May 2017 after Defence Ministry stopped the work as no permission was taken from the Defence Ministry for conserving the monument standing on the land owned by Defence Ministry. Subsequently, efforts were being made by the Delhi state archeology department and local MLA to obtain the permission from Defence Ministry to complete the remaining work of this still dilapidated and abandoned monument.

== See also ==
- Tourism in Delhi
- Delhi Sultanate
- History of Delhi
- Timeline of Delhi
