= 2014 Indian Premier League =

Cricket tournament

- Dates: 16 April 2014 – 1 June 2014
- Administrator: Board of Control for Cricket in India
- Cricket format: Twenty20
- Tournament format(s): Double round robin and playoffs
- Hosts: India; United Arab Emirates
- Champions: Kolkata Knight Riders (2nd title)
- Runners-up: Kings XI Punjab
- Participants: 8
- Matches: 60
- Player of the series: Glenn Maxwell (KXIP)
- Most runs: Robin Uthappa (KKR) (660)
- Most wickets: Mohit Sharma (CSK) (23)
- Official website: iplt20.com

The 2014 Indian Premier League season (abbreviated as IPL 7 or Pepsi IPL 2014) was the seventh season of the Indian Premier League, a professional Twenty20 cricket league established by the Board of Control for Cricket in India (BCCI) in 2007. The tournament featured eight teams, one fewer than in 2013 after the withdrawal of the Pune Warriors India, and was held from 16 April 2014 to 1 June 2014. The opening ceremony was held in the UAE on 15 April 2014. Kolkata Knight Riders won the tournament, defeating Kings XI Punjab by 3 wickets with Manish Pandey declared the man of the match in the final. The average attendance for the tournament was 31,751.

A part of tournament was held outside India as Indian Home Minister Sushil Kumar Shinde declined to provide security for the league as the tournament took place at the same time as the 2014 Indian general election. As a result, the tournament was jointly hosted by India and the United Arab Emirates. The opening 20 matches were held in the UAE at three different stadiums in Abu Dhabi, Dubai and Sharjah with the tournament returning to India on 2 May.

The player auction took place on 12 and 13 February 2014. Unlike previous seasons, the auction was in Indian Rupees as opposed to US dollars.

== Background ==
=== Hosting ===
On 14 February, BCCI secretary Sanjay Patel told the media after the IPL governing council meeting: "As far as possible our interest is to hold the IPL in India. Then, probably, South Africa is the preferred venue at the moment." The initial part of the season was held outside India, to avoid adding to the existing security demands for the 2014 Lok Sabha Elections. South Africa, Bangladesh and UAE were initially shortlisted as alternative venues. The BCCI working committee's meeting on 28 February decided that a final decision would be taken once the schedule for the general election was announced as the BCCI wanted to have as many matches as possible hosted in India due to pressure from the sponsors.

On 2 March 2014, it was reported that Sri Lanka, which was under fourth consideration for hosting the matches, had been ruled out due to prospect of rains in the country during the period. On 5 March 2014, when the dates for general elections were announced, IPL chairman Ranjib Biswal stated that 60–70 percent of the tournament would be held in India. Also, South Africa as an alternate venue was effectively ruled out since they wanted to host the entire tournament, leaving chances open for UAE and Bangladesh.

On 12 March 2014, it was announced that the tournament would begin on 16 April and at least 16 matches would be played in United Arab Emirates until 30 April. From 1 to 12 May, BCCI approached the Ministry of Home Affairs, Government of India seeking permission to play IPL matches in India in cities where the polling concluded in the respective state. All matches after 12 May, which is last day of polling for the elections, would be played in India. No matches would be played on 16 May, the day for counting of votes for the general election. The final was played on 1 June 2014.

=== Schedule ===
The schedule of the first phase of the IPL 2014 was announced on 19 March 2014. The first phase of the tournament consisted of 20 matches played from 16 to 30 April 2014 in the United Arab Emirates. The opening match of the tournament was played between the defending champions Mumbai Indians and the Kolkata Knight Riders on 16 April 2014 at the Sheikh Zayed Cricket Stadium in Abu Dhabi at 6:30 pm local time (8:00 pm IST). From 2 May onwards the 36 games of the regular season and the 4 playoffs were played in India across 10 venues.

=== Staff changes ===
Gary Kirsten signed up as Head Coach of Delhi Daredevils. Kolkata Knight Riders appointed Woorkeri Raman as batting coach while Wasim Akram returned as bowling coach after taking break for IPL-6. Royal Challengers Bangalore announced Daniel Vettori (member of RCB squad, 2011–13) as head coach and Allan Donald (Head coach of the former Pune Warriors India in the last IPL) as bowling coach, while Trent Woodhill (former batting and fielding coach of Delhi Daredevils) was appointed as batting and fielding coach. Darren Lehmann was not able to continue with Kings XI Punjab due to his commitments with Australian cricket team. Sanjay Bangar was appointed as Kings XI's assistant coach. As former Indian cricket team captain Rahul Dravid decided to quit playing IPL after IPL 2013, Rajasthan Royals team management decided to appoint him as the Chief Team Mentor of the Rajasthan Royals team.

=== Insurance ===
Since this year's IPL was played during the Lok Sabha Elections in the country, re-insurance companies asked to double the rates for insurance cover of IPL 7. The insurance cover includes parties like BCCI, franchisees and media partners. The insurance companies expected a high security danger threat during the elections period in the country. The companies demanded Rs. 140 million for a cover of Rs. 9 billion this year which is exactly double the previous year price of Rs. 70 million.

=== Broadcasting ===
Times Internet decided to share IPL digital rights with STAR India giving StarSports.com streaming rights alongside YouTube, which had been streaming IPL since its inception in 2008. In the UK, ITV4 showed the league for the final time before Sky Sports took over in 2015. Willow Cricket carried coverage of the season in the United States.

== Player auction ==
| Player | Salary cap deduction |
Capped
| First | ₹ 12.5 crore (US$2.02 m) |
| Second | ₹ 9.5 crore (US$1.53 m) |
| Third | ₹ 7.5 crore (US$1.21 m) |
| Fourth | ₹ 5.5 crore (US$880,000) |
| Fifth | ₹ 4 crore (US$645,000) |
Uncapped
| Each | ₹ 4 crore (US$645,000) |

| Players retained | Rights to match |
|---|---|
| 0 | 3 |
| 1–2 | 2 |
| 3–5 | 1 |

On 24 December 2013, the IPL Governing Council finalised the Player Regulations for the 2014 season. All teams were allowed to retain a maximum of five players (at most four Indian capped players) and the rest of the players had to be sent into the auction pool. Retention of players led to reduction of the teams' salary cap by a fixed amount, regardless of the players' actual salaries. Some franchises were unhappy with new retention rules. Each team had a starting salary cap of ₹ 600 million (₹ 60 crore). Three franchises retained the maximum of 5 players while Delhi Daredevils retained none.

This season's auction saw the introduction of several new rules. For the first time Indian uncapped players were also into the auction. There is no minimum quota for catchment area players restriction. All player fees was denominated in Indian rupees but overseas players may choose to be paid in another currency. There was also introduction of the "rights to match", which allowed teams to purchase a player from their 2013 squad in the auction by matching the highest bid. The number of "rights to match" depends on the number of players retained by the team. Also, the players' salaries will not include their fees for participation in the Champions League Twenty20. Teams who qualify will pay each player who represents them an additional 10% of his IPL fee. Previously, players who qualified for the CLT20 with their IPL team had to forfeit 20% of their IPL salary to represent another team.

On 27 January 2014 BCCI released a list of capped players to all the franchises which would be available for the auction. This list had a total of 233 players from 10 countries. On 29 January 2014 this list was updated to 244 capped players and 651 uncapped players. On 6 February 2014, the final auction list was shortlisted by teams to 514 players (219 capped and 295 uncapped). The list was further shortened to 511 players (216 capped and 295 uncapped) after the withdrawal of 3 players. The highest base price set was of Rs 20 million and the lowest of Rs 1 million. The auction took place on 12 and 13 February.

On 7 February 2014, a plea was filed in the Supreme Court to interfere in the IPL auction in relation to the 2013 Indian Premier League spot-fixing and betting case involving Gurunath Meiyappan of Chennai Super Kings. On 10 February 2014, an IPL spot-fixing report finding Meiyappan involved in betting was submitted to the Supreme Court. However the Supreme Court allowed the auction to go ahead as planned.

A total of 154 players including 50 overseas players were sold. The list consisted of 80 capped players (of which 34 were Indians) and 74 uncapped players. 127 players (including 10 who have only been part of the squad) have previously been part of IPL teams. 66 players will represent the same team that they played for in 2013. 13 Right to Match cards were used during the auction. Yuvraj Singh fetched the highest bid of ₹14 crore (US$1.5 million) while Dinesh Karthik was the second most expensive purchase at a price of ₹12.5 crore (US$1.3 million) by Delhi Daredevils. Kevin Pietersen was the costliest foreign player. Among uncapped players, Karn Sharma was the most expensive at ₹3.75 crore (US$390,000). Many prominent Indian players and most Sri Lankan and English players were unsold like Luke Wright & Alex Hales.

== Venues ==
Venues in the UAE
Venues in India

The first part of the tournament was hosted in the United Arab Emirates so that the competition would not clash with the Indian elections, with the second part hosted in India. The MA Chidambaram Stadium in Chennai was removed as a venue due to a dispute with the municipal authorities. The home ground of the Rajasthan Royals for the season was also changed from the Sawai Mansingh Stadium in Jaipur to the Sardar Patel Stadium in Ahmedabad as the Rajasthan Cricket Association, the owners of the Sawai Mansingh Stadium, were suspended by the BCCI due to the election of Lalit Modi as its chairman.

United Arab Emirates
| Abu Dhabi | Dubai | Sharjah |
|---|---|---|
| Sheikh Zayed Cricket Stadium | Dubai International Cricket Stadium | Sharjah Cricket Association Stadium |
| Coordinates: 24°23′47″N 54°32′26″E | Coordinates: 25°2′48″N 55°13′8″E | Coordinates: 25°19′50.96″N 55°25′15.44″E |
| Capacity: 20,000 | Capacity: 25,000 | Capacity: 27,000 |
India
| Mohali | Delhi | Ranchi |
| Kings XI Punjab | Delhi Daredevils | Chennai Super Kings |
| Punjab Cricket Association Stadium | Feroz Shah Kotla Stadium | JSCA International Cricket Stadium |
| Capacity: 28,000 | Capacity: 48,000 | Capacity: 39,000 |
| Ahmedabad | Cuttack | Kolkata |
| Rajasthan Royals | Kings XI Punjab Kolkata Knight Riders | Kolkata Knight Riders |
| Sardar Patel Stadium | Barabati Stadium | Eden Gardens |
| Capacity: 54,000 | Capacity: 45,000 | Capacity: 66,000 |
| Mumbai | Bangalore | Hyderabad |
| Mumbai Indians | Royal Challengers Bangalore | Sunrisers Hyderabad |
| Wankhede Stadium | M. Chinnaswamy Stadium | Rajiv Gandhi International Cricket Stadium |
| Capacity: 31,000 | Capacity: 36,000 | Capacity: 55,000 |

== Teams and standings ==
=== League table ===
| Pos | Team | Pld | W | L | NR | Pts | NRR |
|---|---|---|---|---|---|---|---|
| 1 | Kings XI Punjab (R) | 14 | 11 | 3 | 0 | 22 | 0.968 |
| 2 | Kolkata Knight Riders (C) | 14 | 9 | 5 | 0 | 18 | 0.418 |
| 3 | Chennai Super Kings (3) | 14 | 9 | 5 | 0 | 18 | 0.385 |
| 4 | Mumbai Indians (4) | 14 | 7 | 7 | 0 | 14 | 0.095 |
| 5 | Rajasthan Royals | 14 | 7 | 7 | 0 | 14 | 0.060 |
| 6 | Sunrisers Hyderabad | 14 | 6 | 8 | 0 | 12 | −0.399 |
| 7 | Royal Challengers Bangalore | 14 | 5 | 9 | 0 | 10 | −0.428 |
| 8 | Delhi Daredevils | 14 | 2 | 12 | 0 | 4 | −1.182 |

- Top 4 teams were qualified for the playoffs
- advanced to the Qualifier and 2014 Champions League Twenty20 Group Stage
- advanced to the Eliminator and 2014 Champions League Twenty20 Group Stage
- advanced to the Eliminator and 2014 Champions League Twenty20 Qualifying Stage

== League progression ==
| Team | Group matches | | | | | | | | | | | | | | Playoffs | | | |
| Team | 1 | 2 | 3 | 4 | 5 | 6 | 7 | 8 | 9 | 10 | 11 | 12 | 13 | 14 | Q1 | E | Q2 | F |
|---|---|---|---|---|---|---|---|---|---|---|---|---|---|---|---|---|---|---|
| Chennai Super Kings | 0 | 2 | 4 | 6 | 8 | 10 | 12 | 12 | 14 | 16 | 16 | 16 | 16 | 18 | | W | L | |
| Delhi Daredevils | 0 | 2 | 2 | 2 | 4 | 4 | 4 | 4 | 4 | 4 | 4 | 4 | 4 | 4 | | | | |
| Kings XI Punjab | 2 | 4 | 6 | 8 | 10 | 10 | 12 | 14 | 14 | 16 | 18 | 18 | 20 | 22 | L | | W | L |
| Kolkata Knight Riders | 2 | 2 | 4 | 4 | 4 | 4 | 4 | 6 | 8 | 10 | 12 | 14 | 16 | 18 | W | | | W |
| Mumbai Indians | 0 | 0 | 0 | 0 | 0 | 2 | 4 | 4 | 6 | 6 | 8 | 10 | 12 | 14 | | L | | |
| Rajasthan Royals | 2 | 2 | 2 | 4 | 6 | 8 | 10 | 10 | 12 | 12 | 14 | 14 | 14 | 14 | | | | |
| Royal Challengers Bengaluru | 2 | 4 | 4 | 4 | 4 | 6 | 6 | 6 | 6 | 8 | 10 | 10 | 10 | 10 | | | | |
| Sunrisers Hyderabad | 0 | 0 | 2 | 2 | 4 | 4 | 6 | 8 | 8 | 8 | 8 | 10 | 12 | 12 | | | | |

| Win | Loss | No result |

- Note: The total points at the end of each group match are listed.
- Note: Click on the points (group matches) or W/L (playoffs) to see the match summary.

| Visitor team → | CSK | DD | KXIP | KKR | MI | RR | RCB | SRH |
| Home team ↓ | CSK | DD | KXIP | KKR | MI | RR | RCB | SRH |
|---|---|---|---|---|---|---|---|---|
| Chennai Super Kings | | Chennai; 93 runs | Punjab; 6 wickets | Chennai; 34 runs | Chennai; 7 wickets | Chennai; 5 wickets | Bengaluru; 5 wickets | Hyderabad; 6 wickets |
| Delhi Daredevils | Chennai; 8 wickets | | Punjab; 4 wickets | Kolkata; 8 wickets | Delhi; 6 wickets | Rajasthan; 7 wickets | Bengaluru; 8 wickets | Hyderabad; 8 wickets (D/L) |
| Kings XI Punjab | Punjab; 44 runs | Punjab; 7 wickets | | Kolkata; 9 wickets | Mumbai; 7 wickets | Punjab; 16 runs | Punjab; 5 wickets | Punjab; 72 runs |
| Kolkata Knight Riders | Kolkata; 8 wickets | Delhi; 4 wickets | Punjab; 23 runs | | Kolkata; 6 wickets | Rajasthan; Super Over | Kolkata; 30 runs | Kolkata; 4 wickets |
| Mumbai Indians | Chennai; 4 wickets | Mumbai; 15 runs | Mumbai; 5 wickets | Kolkata; 41 runs | | Mumbai; 5 wickets | Mumbai; 19 runs | Hyderabad; 15 runs |
| Rajasthan Royals | Chennai; 7 runs | Rajasthan; 62 runs | Punjab; 7 wickets | Rajasthan; 10 runs | Mumbai; 25 runs | | Rajasthan; 6 wickets | Hyderabad; 32 runs |
| Royal Challengers Bengaluru | Chennai; 8 wickets | Bengaluru; 16 runs | Punjab; 32 runs | Kolkata; 2 runs | Bengaluru; 7 wickets | Rajasthan; 5 wickets | | Bengaluru; 4 wickets |
| Sunrisers Hyderabad | Chennai; 5 wickets | Hyderabad; 4 runs | Punjab; 6 wickets | Kolkata; 7 wickets | Mumbai; 7 wickets | Rajasthan; 4 wickets | Hyderabad; 7 wickets | |

| Home team won | Visitor team won |

- Note: Results listed are according to the home (horizontal) and visitor (vertical) teams.
- Note: Click on a result to see a summary of the match.

== Group stage ==
=== Fixtures ===
16 April
20:00 (D/N)
Scorecard

| Kolkata Knight Riders; 163/5 (20 overs) | v | Mumbai Indians (H); 122/7 (20 overs) |
| Jacques Kallis 72 (46); Lasith Malinga 4/23 (4 overs) | | Ambati Rayudu 48 (40); Sunil Narine 4/20 (4 overs) |

Kolkata won by 41 runs
Sheikh Zayed Stadium, Abu Dhabi
Umpires: Marais Erasmus (SA) and Richard Illingworth (Eng)
Player of the match: Jacques Kallis (KKR)

- Kolkata Knight Riders won the toss and elected to bat.

17 April
20:00 (D/N)
Scorecard

| (H) Delhi Daredevils; 145/4 (20 overs) | v | Royal Challengers Bangalore; 146/2 (16.4 overs) |
| Jean-Paul Duminy 67 (48); Varun Aaron 1/9 (3 overs) | | Yuvraj Singh 52 (29); Shami Ahmed 1/30 (4 overs) |

Bangalore won by 8 wickets
Sharjah Cricket Stadium
Umpires: Aleem Dar (Pak) and S Ravi (Ind)
Player of the match: Yuzvendra Chahal (RCB)

- Royal Challengers Bangalore won the toss and elected to field.

18 April
16:00
Scorecard

| (H) Chennai Super Kings; 205/4 (20 overs) | v | Kings XI Punjab; 206/4 (18.5 overs) |
| Brendon McCullum 67 (45); Lakshmipathy Balaji 2/43 (4 overs) | | Glenn Maxwell 95 (43); Ravichandran Ashwin 2/41 (4 overs) |

Punjab won by 6 wickets
Sheikh Zayed Stadium, Abu Dhabi
Umpires: Richard Illingworth (Eng) and Chettithody Shamshuddin (Ind)
Player of the match: Glenn Maxwell (KXIP)

- Chennai Super Kings won the toss and chose to bat.
- This was the 100th match for Suresh Raina in his IPL career, during which he has only represented CSK and had played in every one of their matches.

18 April
20:00 (D/N)
Scorecard

| (H) Sunrisers Hyderabad; 133/6 (20 overs) | v | Rajasthan Royals; 135/6 (19.3 overs) |
| Shikhar Dhawan 38 (34); Rajat Bhatia 2/22 (4 overs) | | Ajinkya Rahane 59 (53); Amit Mishra 2/26 (4 overs) |

Rajasthan won by 4 wickets
Sheikh Zayed Stadium, Abu Dhabi
Umpires: Billy Bowden (NZ) and Richard Illingworth (Eng)
Player of the match: Ajinkya Rahane (RR)

- Rajasthan Royals won the toss and chose to field.

19 April
16:00
Scorecard

| Mumbai Indians; 115/9 (20 overs) | v | Royal Challengers Bangalore (H); 116/3 (17.3 overs) |
| Ambati Rayudu 35 (37); Yuzvendra Chahal 2/17 | | Parthiv Patel 57* (45); Zaheer Khan 2/21 (4 overs) |

Bangalore won by 7 wickets
Dubai International Cricket Stadium
Umpires: Aleem Dar (Pak) and Anil Chaudhary (Ind)
Player of the match: Parthiv Patel (RCB)

- Royal Challengers Bangalore won the toss and chose to field.

19 April
20:00 (D/N)
Scorecard

| (H) Kolkata Knight Riders; 166/5 (20 overs) | v | Delhi Daredevils; 167/6 (19.3 overs) |
| Robin Uthappa 55 (41); Nathan Coulter-Nile 2/27 (4 overs) | | Dinesh Karthik 56 (40); Morné Morkel 2/41 (4 overs) |

Delhi won by 4 wickets
Dubai International Cricket Stadium
Umpires: Aleem Dar (Pak) and Vineet Kulkarni (Ind)
Player of the match: JP Duminy (DD)

- Kolkata Knight Riders won the toss and elected to bat.

20 April
20:00 (D/N)
Scorecard

| (H) Rajasthan Royals; 191/5 (20 overs) | v | Kings XI Punjab; 193/3 (18.4 overs) |
| Sanju Samson 52 (34); Akshar Patel 1/22 (4 overs) | | Glenn Maxwell 89(43); Kane Richardson 1/25 (3 overs) |

Punjab won by 7 wickets
Sharjah Cricket Stadium
Umpires: Billy Bowden (NZ) and Marais Erasmus (SA)
Player of the match: Glenn Maxwell (KXIP)

- Kings XI Punjab won the toss and elected to field.

21 April
20:00 (D/N)
Scorecard

| (H) Chennai Super Kings; 177/7 (20 overs) | v | Delhi Daredevils; 84 (15.4 overs) |
| Suresh Raina 56 (41); Jaydev Unadkat 3/32 (4 overs) | | Jimmy Neesham 22 (15); Ravichandran Ashwin 2/3 (2 overs) |

Chennai won by 93 runs
Sheikh Zayed Stadium, Abu Dhabi
Umpires: Richard Illingworth (Eng) and Chettithody Shamshuddin (Ind)
Player of the match: Suresh Raina (CSK)

- Chennai Super Kings won the toss and chose to bat.

22 April
20:00 (D/N)
Scorecard

| (H) Kings XI Punjab; 193/6 (20 overs) | v | Sunrisers Hyderabad; 121 (19.2 overs) |
| Glenn Maxwell 95 (43); Bhuvneshwar Kumar 3/19 (4 overs) | | Lokesh Rahul 27 (27); Lakshmipathy Balaji 4/13 (4 overs) |

Punjab won by 72 runs
Sharjah Cricket Stadium
Umpires: Marais Erasmus (SA) and S Ravi (Ind)
Player of the match: Glenn Maxwell (KXIP)

- Sunrisers Hyderabad won the toss and elected to field.

23 April
20:00 (D/N)
Scorecard

| Chennai Super Kings; 140/6 (20 overs) | v | Rajasthan Royals (H); 133 (19.5 overs) |
| Dwayne Smith 50 (28); Rajat Bhatia 2/13 (4 overs) | | Dhawal Kulkarni 28 (19); Ravindra Jadeja 4/33 (4 overs) |

Chennai won by 7 runs
Dubai International Cricket Stadium
Umpires: Kumar Dharmasena (SL) and Richard Illingworth (Eng)
Player of the match: Ravindra Jadeja (CSK)

- Rajasthan Royals won the toss and elected to field.

24 April
20:00 (D/N)
Scorecard

| Kolkata Knight Riders; 150/7 (20 overs) | v | Royal Challengers Bangalore (H); 148/5 (20 overs) |
| Chris Lynn 45 (31); Varun Aaron 3/16 (4 overs) | | Yogesh Takawale 40 (28); Vinay Kumar 2/26 (4 overs) |

Kolkata won by 2 runs
Sharjah Cricket Stadium
Umpires: Aleem Dar (Pak) and Vineet Kulkarni (Ind)
Player of the match: Chris Lynn (KKR)

- Royal Challengers Bangalore won the toss and elected to field.

25 April
16:00
Scorecard

| (H) Sunrisers Hyderabad; 184/1 (20 overs) | v | Delhi Daredevils; 180/4 (20 overs) |
| Aaron Finch 88* (53); Shahbaz Nadeem 1/24 (4 overs) | | Murali Vijay 52 (40); Dale Steyn 2/33 (4 overs) |

Hyderabad won by 4 runs
Dubai International Cricket Stadium
Umpires: Marais Erasmus (SA) and S Ravi (Ind)
Player of the match: Aaron Finch (SRH)

- Sunrisers Hyderabad won the toss and chose to bat.

25 April
20:00 (D/N)
Scorecard

| Mumbai Indians; 141/7 (20 overs) | v | Chennai Super Kings (H); 142/3 (19 overs) |
| Rohit Sharma 50 (41); Mohit Sharma 4/14 (4 overs) | | Brendon McCullum 71* (53); Harbhajan Singh 2/27 (4 overs) |

Chennai won by 7 wickets
Dubai International Cricket Stadium
Umpires: Billy Bowden (NZ) and Marais Erasmus (SA)
Player of the match: Mohit Sharma (CSK)

- Mumbai Indians won the toss and chose to bat.
- This was the 100th IPL match for both MS Dhoni and Rohit Sharma.

26 April
16:00
Scorecard

| Royal Challengers Bangalore; 70 (15 overs) | v | Rajasthan Royals (H); 71/4 (13 overs) |
| Virat Kohli 21 (25); Pravin Tambe 4/20 (4 overs) | | Shane Watson 24 (24); Mitchell Starc 2/29 (4 overs) |

Rajasthan won by 6 wickets
Sheikh Zayed Stadium, Abu Dhabi
Umpires: Kumar Dharmasena (SL) and Chettithody Shamshuddin (Ind)
Player of the match: Pravin Tambe (RR)

- Rajasthan Royals won the toss and elected to field.
- Royal Challengers Bangalore's total of 70 was the third lowest in IPL history.

26 April
20:00 (D/N)
Scorecard

| Kings XI Punjab; 132/9 (20 overs) | v | Kolkata Knight Riders (H); 109 (18.2 overs) |
| Virender Sehwag 37 (30); Piyush Chawla 3/19 (4 overs) | | Suryakumar Yadav 34 (17); Sandeep Sharma 3/21 (4 overs) |

Punjab won by 23 runs
Sheikh Zayed Stadium, Abu Dhabi
Umpires: Kumar Dharmasena (SL) and Richard Illingworth (Eng)
Player of the match: Sandeep Sharma (KXIP)

- Kolkata Knight Riders won the toss and elected to field.

27 April
16:00
Scorecard

| Mumbai Indians; 125/6 (20 overs) | v | Delhi Daredevils (H); 126/4 (18.5 overs) |
| Kieron Pollard 33* (30); Jaydev Unadkat 2/29 (4 overs) | | Murali Vijay 40 (34); Lasith Malinga 2/17 (4 overs) |

Delhi won by 6 wickets
Sharjah Cricket Stadium
Umpires: Aleem Dar (Pak) and Vineet Kulkarni (Ind)
Player of the match: Murali Vijay (DD)

- Mumbai Indians won the toss and elected to bat.

27 April
20:00 (D/N)
Scorecard

| (H) Sunrisers Hyderabad; 145/5 (20 overs) | v | Chennai Super Kings; 146/5 (19.3 overs) |
| Aaron Finch 44 (45); Mohit Sharma 2/27 (4 overs) | | Dwayne Smith 66 (46); Bhuvneshwar Kumar 2/23 (4 overs) |

Chennai won by 5 wickets
Sharjah Cricket Stadium
Umpires: Anil Chaudhary (Ind) and Vineet Kulkarni (Ind)
Player of the match: Dwayne Smith (CSK)

- Sunrisers Hyderabad won the toss and elected to bat.

28 April
20:00 (D/N)
Scorecard

| Royal Challengers Bangalore; 124/8 (20 overs) | v | Kings XI Punjab (H); 127/5 (18.5 overs) |
| Yuvraj Singh 35 (32); Sandeep Sharma 3/15 (3 overs) | | Virender Sehwag 32 (26); Yuzvendra Chahal 2/23 (4 overs) |

Punjab won by 5 wickets
Dubai International Cricket Stadium
Umpires: Billy Bowden (NZ) and S Ravi (Ind)
Player of the match: Sandeep Sharma (KXIP)

- Kings XI Punjab won the toss and elected to field.

29 April
20:00 (D/N)
Scorecard

| Rajasthan Royals; 152/5 (20 overs) | v | Kolkata Knight Riders (H); 152/8 (20 overs) |
| Ajinkya Rahane 72 (59); Vinay Kumar 2/30 (4 overs) | | Gautam Gambhir 45 (44); James Faulkner 3/11 (2 overs) |

Match tied; Rajasthan won on boundary count
Sheikh Zayed Stadium, Abu Dhabi
Umpires: Aleem Dar (Pak) and Anil Chaudhary (Ind)
Player of the match: James Faulkner (RR)

- Rajasthan Royals won the toss and elected to bat.

30 April
20:00 (D/N)
Scorecard

| Sunrisers Hyderabad; 172/5 (20 overs) | v | Mumbai Indians (H); 157/7 (20 overs) |
| David Warner 65 (51); Zaheer Khan 2/26 (4 overs) | | Kieron Pollard 78 (48); Bhuvneshwar Kumar 2/17 (4 overs) |

Hyderabad won by 15 runs
Dubai International Cricket Stadium
Umpires: Kumar Dharmasena (SL) and Marais Erasmus (SA)
Player of the match: Bhuvneshwar Kumar (SRH)

- Mumbai Indians won the toss and elected to field.

2 May
20:00 (D/N)
Scorecard

| (H) Chennai Super Kings; 148/3 (17 overs) | v | Kolkata Knight Riders; 114/9 (17 overs) |
| Brendon McCullum 56 (40); Shakib Al Hasan 2/25 (4 overs) | | Robin Uthappa 47 (38); Ravindra Jadeja 4/12 (4 overs) |

Chennai won by 34 runs
JSCA International Stadium Complex, Ranchi
Umpires: Anil Chaudhary (Ind) and Nigel Llong (Eng)
Player of the match: Ravindra Jadeja (CSK)

- Chennai Super Kings won the toss and elected to bat.
- Match reduced to 17 overs per side due to rain.

3 May
16:00
Scorecard

| Kings XI Punjab; 168/5 (20 overs) | v | Mumbai Indians (H); 170/5 (19.1 overs) |
| Wriddhiman Saha 59* (47); Harbhajan Singh 2/34 (4 overs) | | Rohit Sharma 39 (34); Rishi Dhawan 2/23 (4 overs) |

Mumbai won by 5 wickets
Wankhede Stadium, Mumbai
Umpires: Bruce Oxenford (Aus) and Chettithody Shamshuddin (Ind)
Player of the match: Corey Anderson (MI)

- Kings XI Punjab won the toss and elected to bat.

3 May
20:00 (D/N)
Scorecard

| (H) Delhi Daredevils; 152/5 (20 overs) | v | Rajasthan Royals; 156/3 (18.3 overs) |
| Quinton de Kock 42 (33); Pravin Tambe 2/25 (4 overs) | | Karun Nair 73* (50); Mohammed Shami 1/22 (4 overs) |

Rajasthan won by 7 wickets
Feroz Shah Kotla, Delhi
Umpires: Sanjay Hazare (Ind) and S Ravi (Ind)
Player of the match: Karun Nair (RR)

- Rajasthan Royals won the toss and elected to field.

4 May
20:00 (D/N)
Scorecard

| Sunrisers Hyderabad; 155/6 (20 overs) | v | Royal Challengers Bangalore (H); 158/6 (19.5 overs) |
| David Warner 61 (49); Mitchell Starc 2/21 (4 overs) | | AB de Villiers 89* (41); Karn Sharma 3/17 (4 overs) |

Bangalore won by 4 wickets
M Chinnaswamy Stadium, Bangalore
Umpires: Kumar Dharmasena (SL) and Vineet Kulkarni (Ind)
Player of the match: AB de Villiers (RCB)

- Royal Challengers Bangalore won the toss and elected to field.

5 May
16:00 (D/N)
Scorecard

| (H) Rajasthan Royals; 170/6 (20 overs) | v | Kolkata Knight Riders; 160/6 (20 overs) |
| Karun Nair 44 (35); Sunil Narine 2/28 (4 overs) | | Robin Uthappa 65 (52); Shane Watson 3/21 (4 overs) |

Rajasthan won by 10 runs
Sardar Patel Stadium, Motera, Ahmedabad
Umpires: Nigel Llong (Eng) and CK Nandan (Ind)
Player of the match: Pravin Tambe (RR)

- Kolkata Knight Riders won the toss and elected to field.
- Pravin Tambe (RR) took the twelfth overall IPL hat-trick.

5 May
20:00 (D/N)
Scorecard

| (H) Delhi Daredevils; 178/5 (20 overs) | v | Chennai Super Kings; 181/2 (19.4 overs) |
| Dinesh Karthik 51 (36); Ravindra Jadeja 1/23 (4 overs) | | Dwayne Smith 79 (51); Wayne Parnell 1/25 (4 overs) |

Chennai won by 8 wickets
Feroz Shah Kotla, Delhi
Umpires: Rajesh Deshpande (Ind) and Bruce Oxenford (Aus)
Player of the match: Dwayne Smith (CSK)

- Chennai Super Kings won the toss and elected to field.

6 May
20:00 (D/N)
Scorecard

| (H) Mumbai Indians; 187/5 (20 overs) | v | Royal Challengers Bangalore; 168/8 (20 overs) |
| Rohit Sharma 59* (35); Harshal Patel 1/28 (4 overs) | | Chris Gayle 38 (24); Jasprit Bumrah 2/22 (4 overs) |

Mumbai won by 19 runs
Wankhede Stadium, Mumbai
Umpires: S Ravi (Ind) and Krishnaraj Srinath (Ind)
Player of the match: Rohit Sharma (MI)

- Royal Challengers Bangalore won the toss and elected to field.
- This was the 100th match for Virat Kohli in his IPL career, during which he has only represented RCB.

7 May
16:00 (D/N)
Scorecard

| (H) Delhi Daredevils; 160/5 (20 overs) | v | Kolkata Knight Riders; 161/2 (18.2 overs) |
| Jean-Paul Duminy 40* (28); Shakib Al Hasan 1/13 (4 overs) | | Gautam Gambhir 69 (56); Wayne Parnell 2/21 (4 overs) |

Kolkata won by 8 wickets
Feroz Shah Kotla, Delhi
Umpires: Bruce Oxenford (Aus) and Chettithody Shamshuddin (Ind)
Player of the match: Gautam Gambhir (KKR)

- Delhi Daredevils won the toss and elected to bat.
- This was the 100th match for Dinesh Karthik in his IPL career.

7 May
20:00 (D/N)
Scorecard

| (H) Kings XI Punjab; 231/4 (20 overs) | v | Chennai Super Kings; 187/6 (20 overs) |
| Glenn Maxwell 90 (38); Mohit Sharma 2/38 (4 overs) | | Faf du Plessis 52 (25); Mitchell Johnson 2/37 (4 overs) |

Punjab won by 44 runs
Barabati Stadium, Cuttack
Umpires: Kumar Dharmasena (SL) and Paschim Pathak (Ind)
Player of the match: Glenn Maxwell (KXIP)

- Chennai Super Kings won the toss and elected to field.
- Suresh Raina became the first player to score 3000 runs in IPL.

8 May
20:00 (D/N)
Scorecard

| Sunrisers Hyderabad; 134/9 (20 overs) | v | Rajasthan Royals (H); 102 (19.5 overs) |
| Shikhar Dhawan 33 (20); Shane Watson 3/13 (2 overs) | | Steve Smith 22 (33); Bhuvneshwar Kumar 4/14 (4 overs) |

Hyderabad won by 32 runs
Sardar Patel Stadium, Motera, Ahmedabad
Umpires: Anil Chaudhary (Ind) and Nigel Llong (Eng)
Player of the match: Bhuvneshwar Kumar (SRH)

- Rajasthan Royals won the toss and elected to field.
- Shane Watson took the thirteenth IPL hat-trick.

9 May
20:00 (D/N)
Scorecard

| Kings XI Punjab; 198/8 (20 overs) | v | Royal Challengers Bangalore (H); 166/9 (20 overs) |
| David Miller 66 (29); Yuzvendra Chahal 2/23 (4 overs) | | AB de Villiers 53 (26); Sandeep Sharma 3/25 (4 overs) |

Punjab won by 32 runs
M Chinnaswamy Stadium, Bangalore
Umpires: S Ravi (Ind) and Krishnaraj Srinath (Ind)
Player of the match: Sandeep Sharma (KXIP)

- Royal Challengers Bangalore won the toss and elected to field.

10 May
16:00 (D/N)
Scorecard

| (H) Delhi Daredevils; 143/7 (20 overs) | v | Sunrisers Hyderabad; 44/2 (4.2 overs) |
| Dinesh Karthik 39 (30); Dale Steyn 2/20 (4 overs) | | Naman Ojha 13* (3); Siddarth Kaul 1/5 (1 over) |

Hyderabad won by 8 wickets (D/L method)
Feroz Shah Kotla, Delhi
Umpires: Rajesh Deshpande (Ind) and Bruce Oxenford (Aus)
Player of the match: Dale Steyn (SRH)

- Sunrisers Hyderabad won the toss and elected to field.
- Due to rain Hyderabad's target was adjusted to 43 runs from 5 overs via Duckworth–Lewis method
- Amit Mishra became the second player to take 100 wickets in IPL.

10 May
20:00 (D/N)
Scorecard

| (H) Mumbai Indians; 157/6 (20 overs) | v | Chennai Super Kings; 160/6 (19.3 overs) |
| Ambati Rayudu 59 (43); Ravichandran Ashwin 3/30 (4 overs) | | Dwayne Smith 57 (51); Lasith Malinga 2/15 (4 overs) |

Chennai won by 4 wickets
Wankhede Stadium, Mumbai
Umpires: Kumar Dharmasena (SL) and Vineet Kulkarni (Ind)
Player of the match: Dwayne Smith (CSK)

- Chennai Super Kings won the toss and elected to field.

11 May
16:00 (D/N)
Scorecard

| (H) Kings XI Punjab; 149/8 (20 overs) | v | Kolkata Knight Riders; 150/1 (18 overs) |
| Virender Sehwag 72 (50); Piyush Chawla 3/19 (4 overs) | | Gautam Gambhir 63* (45); Parvinder Awana 1/20 (2 overs) |

Kolkata won by 9 wickets
Barabati Stadium, Cuttack
Umpires: Nigel Llong (Eng) and CK Nandan (Ind)
Player of the match: Gautam Gambhir (KKR)

- Kolkata Knight Riders won the toss and elected to field.
- This was the 100th match for Robin Uthappa in his IPL career.

11 May
20:00 (D/N)
Scorecard

| (H) Royal Challengers Bangalore; 190/5 (20 overs) | v | Rajasthan Royals; 191/5 (18.5 overs) |
| Yuvraj Singh 83 (38); Kane Richardson 2/43 (4 overs) | | Karun Nair 56 (39); Yuvraj Singh 4/35 (4 overs) |

Rajasthan won by 5 wickets
M Chinnaswamy Stadium, Bangalore
Umpires: S Ravi (Ind) and Rod Tucker (Aus)
Player of the match: James Faulkner (RR)

- Royal Challengers Bangalore won the toss and elected to bat.

12 May
20:00 (D/N)
Scorecard

| (H) Sunrisers Hyderabad; 157/3 (20 overs) | v | Mumbai Indians; 160/3 (18.4 overs) |
| Aaron Finch 68 (62); Lasith Malinga 2/35 (4 overs) | | Ambati Rayudu 68 (46); Bhuvneshwar Kumar 2/21 (4 overs) |

Mumbai won by 7 wickets
Rajiv Gandhi International Stadium, Uppal, Hyderabad
Umpires: Kumar Dharmasena (SL) and Vineet Kulkarni (Ind)
Player of the match: Ambati Rayudu (MI)

- Sunrisers Hyderabad won the toss and elected to bat.

13 May
16:00 (D/N)
Scorecard

| Rajasthan Royals; 148/8 (20 overs) | v | Chennai Super Kings (H); 149/5 (19.4 overs) |
| Shane Watson 51 (36); Mohit Sharma 3/30 (4 overs) | | Dwayne Smith 44 (35); Ankit Sharma 2/20 (4 overs) |

Chennai won by 5 wickets
JSCA International Stadium Complex, Ranchi
Umpires: Bruce Oxenford (Aus) and Chettithody Shamshuddin (Ind)
Player of the match: Ravindra Jadeja (CSK)

- Rajasthan Royals won the toss and elected to bat.

13 May
20:00 (D/N)
Scorecard

| (H) Royal Challengers Bangalore; 186/4 (20 overs) | v | Delhi Daredevils; 170/7 (20 overs) |
| Yuvraj Singh 68* (29); Mohammed Shami 1/31 (4 overs) | | Jean-Paul Duminy 48 (30); Muttiah Muralitharan 2/25 (4 overs) |

Bangalore won by 16 runs
M Chinnaswamy Stadium, Bangalore
Umpires: Krishnaraj Srinath (Ind) and Rod Tucker (Aus)
Player of the match: Yuvraj Singh (RCB)

- Delhi Daredevils won the toss and elected to field.

14 May
16:00 (D/N)
Scorecard

| (H) Sunrisers Hyderabad; 205/5 (20 overs) | v | Kings XI Punjab; 211/4 (18.4 overs) |
| Naman Ojha 79* (36); Rishi Dhawan 2/42 (4 overs) | | Wriddhiman Saha 54 (26); Amit Mishra 1/32 (4 overs) |

Punjab won by 6 wickets
Rajiv Gandhi International Stadium, Uppal, Hyderabad
Umpires: Vineet Kulkarni (Ind) and Paschim Pathak (Ind)
Player of the match: Wriddhiman Saha (KXIP)

- Kings XI Punjab won the toss and elected to field.

14 May
20:00 (D/N)
Scorecard

| Mumbai Indians; 141/5 (20 overs) | v | Kolkata Knight Riders (H); 142/4 (18.4 overs) |
| Rohit Sharma 51 (45); Morné Morkel 2/35 (4 overs) | | Robin Uthappa 80 (52); Harbhajan Singh 2/22 (4 overs) |

Kolkata won by 6 wickets
Barabati Stadium, Cuttack
Umpires: Anil Chaudhary (Ind) and Nigel Llong (Eng)
Player of the match: Robin Uthappa (KKR)

- Kolkata Knight Riders won the toss and elected to field.
- This was the 100th match for Yusuf Pathan in his IPL career
- This match was moved to a neutral venue as security constraints due to the elections prevented Eden Gardens from hosting.

15 May
20:00 (D/N)
Scorecard

| (H) Rajasthan Royals; 201/6 (20 overs) | v | Delhi Daredevils; 139/9 (20 overs) |
| Ajinkya Rahane 64 (50); Imran Tahir 2/25 (4 overs) | | Manoj Tiwary 61* (44); Rajat Bhatia 2/18 (3 overs) |

Rajasthan won by 62 runs
Sardar Patel Stadium, Motera, Ahmedabad
Umpires: S Ravi (Ind) and Rod Tucker (Aus)
Player of the match: Ajinkya Rahane (RR)

- Delhi Daredevils won the toss and elected to field.
- Delhi Daredevils were eliminated as a result of this match.

18 May
16:00 (D/N)
Scorecard

| (H) Chennai Super Kings; 138/4 (20 overs) | v | Royal Challengers Bangalore; 142/5 (19.5 overs) |
| Suresh Raina 62* (48); Varun Aaron 2/29 (3 overs) | | Chris Gayle 46 (50); Ravichandran Ashwin 2/16 (4 overs) |

Bangalore won by 5 wickets
JSCA International Stadium Complex, Ranchi
Umpires: Bruce Oxenford (Aus) and Chettithody Shamshuddin (India)
Player of the match: AB de Villiers (RCB)

- Chennai Super Kings won the toss and elected to bat.

18 May
20:00 (D/N)
Scorecard

| (H) Sunrisers Hyderabad; 142/8 (20 overs) | v | Kolkata Knight Riders; 146/3 (19.4 overs) |
| David Warner 34 (18); Umesh Yadav 3/26 (4 overs) | | Robin Uthappa 40 (33); Karn Sharma 1/19 (4 overs) |

Kolkata won by 7 wickets
Rajiv Gandhi International Stadium, Uppal, Hyderabad
Umpires: Nigel Llong (Eng) and CK Nandan (Ind)
Player of the match: Umesh Yadav (KKR)

- Sunrisers Hyderabad won the toss and elected to bat.

19 May
16:00 (D/N)
Scorecard

| Mumbai Indians; 178/3 (20 overs) | v | Rajasthan Royals (H); 153/8 (20 overs) |
| Lendl Simmons 62 (51); Ankit Sharma 2/23 (4 overs) | | Karun Nair 48 (24); Harbhajan Singh 2/13 (4 overs) |

Mumbai won by 25 runs
Sardar Patel Stadium, Motera, Ahmedabad
Umpires: S Ravi (Ind) and Rod Tucker (Aus)
Player of the match: Michael Hussey (MI)

- Mumbai Indians won the toss and chose to bat.

19 May
20:00 (D/N)
Scorecard

| (H) Delhi Daredevils; 164/7 (20 overs) | v | Kings XI Punjab; 165/6 (19.4 overs) |
| Dinesh Karthik 69 (44); Sandeep Sharma 3/35 (4 overs) | | Manan Vohra 42 (19); Imran Tahir 3/22 (4 overs) |

Punjab won by 4 wickets
Feroz Shah Kotla, Delhi
Umpires: Kumar Dharmasena (SL) and Pashchim Pathak (Ind)
Player of the match: Axar Patel (KXIP)

- Kings XI Punjab won the toss and elected to field.
- Kings XI Punjab qualified for the playoffs as a result of this match.

20 May
16:00 (D/N)
Scorecard

| Royal Challengers Bangalore; 160/6 (20 overs) | v | Sunrisers Hyderabad (H); 161/3 (19.4 overs) |
| Virat Kohli 67 (41); Bhuvneshwar Kumar 2/27 (4 overs) | | David Warner 59 (46); Varun Aaron 2/36 (4 overs) |

Hyderabad won by 7 wickets
Rajiv Gandhi International Stadium, Uppal, Hyderabad
Umpires: Anil Chaudhary (Ind) and Nigel Llong (Eng)
Player of the match: David Warner (SRH)

- Royal Challengers Bangalore won the toss and elected to bat.
- Chennai Super Kings qualified for the playoffs as a result of this match.

20 May
20:00 (D/N)
Scorecard

| Chennai Super Kings; 154/4 (20 overs) | v | Kolkata Knight Riders (H); 156/2 (18 overs) |
| Suresh Raina 65 (52); Sunil Narine 1/24 (4 overs) | | Robin Uthappa 67 (39); Ravindra Jadeja 1/23 (3 overs) |

Kolkata won by 8 wickets
Eden Gardens, Kolkata
Umpires: Rajesh Deshpande (Ind) and Chettithody Shamshuddin (Ind)
Player of the match: Robin Uthappa (KKR)

- Kolkata Knight Riders won the toss and elected to field.
- This was the 100th match for Gautam Gambhir in his IPL career.

21 May
20:00 (D/N)
Scorecard

| (H) Kings XI Punjab; 156/8 (20 overs) | v | Mumbai Indians; 159/3 (19 overs) |
| George Bailey 39 (30); Jasprit Bumrah 2/31 (4 overs) | | Lendl Simmons 100* (61); Akshar Patel 1/27 (4 overs) |

Mumbai won by 7 wickets
Punjab Cricket Association Stadium, Mohali, Chandigarh
Umpires: Kumar Dharmasena (SL) and Vineet Kulkarni (Ind)
Player of the match: Lendl Simmons (MI)

- Mumbai Indians won the toss and elected to field.

22 May
16:00 (D/N)
Scorecard

| (H) Kolkata Knight Riders; 195/4 (20 overs) | v | Royal Challengers Bangalore; 165/5 (20 overs) |
| Robin Uthappa 83* (51); Mitchell Starc 1/32 (4 overs) | | Yogesh Takawale 45 (36); Sunil Narine 4/20 (4 overs) |

Kolkata won by 30 runs
Eden Gardens, Kolkata
Umpires: Anil Chaudhary (Ind) and CK Nandan (Ind)
Player of the match: Robin Uthappa (KKR)

- Royal Challengers Bangalore won the toss and elected to field.
- Kolkata Knight Riders qualified for the playoffs, and Royal Challengers Bangalore were eliminated as a result of this match.

22 May
20:00 (D/N)
Scorecard

| (H) Chennai Super Kings; 185/3 (20 overs) | v | Sunrisers Hyderabad; 189/4 (19.4 overs) |
| Mahendra Singh Dhoni 57* (41); Karn Sharma 2/19 (4 overs) | | David Warner 90 (45); Suresh Raina 1/17 (2 overs) |

Hyderabad won by 6 wickets
JSCA International Stadium Complex, Ranchi
Umpires: Bruce Oxenford (Aus) and Chettithody Shamshuddin (Ind)
Player of the match: David Warner (SRH)

- Sunrisers Hyderabad won the toss and elected to field.

23 May
16:00 (D/N)
Scorecard

| (H) Mumbai Indians; 173 (19.3 overs) | v | Delhi Daredevils; 158/4 (20 overs) |
| Michael Hussey 56 (33); Imran Tahir 3/37 (4 overs) | | Jean-Paul Duminy 45* (29); Marchant de Lange 2/32 (4 overs) |

Mumbai won by 15 runs
Wankhede Stadium, Mumbai
Umpires: S Ravi (Ind) and Rod Tucker (Aus)
Player of the match: Michael Hussey (MI)

- Delhi Daredevils won the toss and elected to field.

23 May
20:00 (D/N)
Scorecard

| (H) Kings XI Punjab; 179/4 (20 overs) | v | Rajasthan Royals; 163/8 (20 overs) |
| Shaun Marsh 40 (35); Rahul Tewatia 1/24 (4 overs) | | James Faulkner 35* (13); Akshar Patel 3/24 (4 overs) |

Punjab won by 16 runs
Punjab Cricket Association Stadium, Mohali, Chandigarh
Umpires: Kumar Dharmasena (SL) and Paschim Pathak (Ind)
Player of the match: Shaun Marsh (KXIP)

- Rajasthan Royals won the toss and elected to field.
- Kings XI Punjab advanced to Qualifier 1 as a result of this match.

24 May
16:00 (D/N)
Scorecard

| (H) Royal Challengers Bangalore; 154/6 (20 overs) | v | Chennai Super Kings; 160/2 (17.4 overs) |
| Virat Kohli 73 (49); Ashish Nehra 3/33 (4 overs) | | Faf du Plessis 54* (43); Ravi Rampaul 1/21 (2 overs) |

Chennai won by 8 wickets
M Chinnaswamy Stadium, Bangalore
Umpires: Anil Chaudhary (Ind) and Nigel Llong (Eng)
Player of the match: Mahendra Singh Dhoni (CSK)

- Chennai Super Kings won the toss and elected to field.

24 May
20:00 (D/N)
Scorecard

| Sunrisers Hyderabad; 160/7 (20 overs) | v | Kolkata Knight Riders (H); 161/6 (14.2 overs) |
| Darren Sammy 29 (19); Ryan ten Doeschate 1/7 (1 over) | | Yusuf Pathan 72 (22); Karn Sharma 4/38 (4 overs) |

Kolkata won by 4 wickets
Eden Gardens, Kolkata
Umpires: Rajesh Deshpande (Ind) and Bruce Oxenford (Aus)
Player of the match: Yusuf Pathan (KKR)

- Kolkata Knight Riders won the toss and elected to field.
- To advance to Qualifier 1 ahead of Chennai Super Kings, Kolkata Knight Riders needed to complete the chase within 15.2 overs.
- Yusuf Pathan scored the fastest half-century in IPL history.
- Kolkata Knight Riders advanced to Qualifier 1, and Sunrisers Hyderabad were eliminated as a result of this match.

25 May
16:00 (D/N)
Scorecard

| Delhi Daredevils; 115 (18.1 overs) | v | Kings XI Punjab (H); 119/3 (13.5 overs) |
| Kevin Pietersen 58 (41); Parvinder Awana 2/15 (3 overs) | | David Miller 47* (34); Jaydev Unadkat 1/3 (2 overs) |

Punjab won by 7 wickets
Punjab Cricket Association Stadium, Mohali, Chandigarh
Umpires: Kumar Dharmasena (SL) and Vineet Kulkarni (Ind)
Player of the match: Manan Vohra (KXIP)

- Kings XI Punjab won the toss and elected to field.

25 May
20:00 (D/N)
Scorecard

| Rajasthan Royals; 189/4 (20 overs) | v | Mumbai Indians (H); 195/5 (14.4 overs) |
| Sanju Samson 74 (47); Jasprit Bumrah 1/30 (4 overs) | | Corey Anderson 95* (44); Kevon Cooper 2/38 (4 overs) |

Mumbai won by 5 wickets
Wankhede Stadium, Mumbai
Umpires: Krishnaraj Srinath (Ind) and Rod Tucker (Aus)
Player of the match: Corey Anderson (MI)

- Mumbai Indians won the toss and elected to field.
- To qualify for the playoffs ahead of Rajasthan Royals, Mumbai Indians needed to complete the chase by scoring 190 runs in 14.3 overs or 191 runs in 14.4 overs.
- Mumbai Indians qualified for the playoffs, and Rajasthan Royals were eliminated as a result of this match.

== Playoff stage ==
Semifinals
28 May — Eden Gardens, Kolkata
1 | Kings XI Punjab | 135/8 (20 ov)
2 | Kolkata Knight Riders | 163/8 (20 ov)
28 May — Brabourne Stadium, Mumbai
3 | Chennai Super Kings | 176/3 (18.4 ov)
4 | Mumbai Indians | 173/8 (20 ov)

Preliminary final
30 May — Wankhede Stadium, Mumbai
1 | Kings XI Punjab | 226/6 (20 ov)
3 | Chennai Super Kings | 202/7 (20 ov)

Final
1 June — M Chinnaswamy Stadium, Bengaluru
2 | Kolkata Knight Riders | 200/7 (19.3 ov)
1 | Kings XI Punjab | 199/4 (20 ov)

=== Preliminary ===
Qualifier 1
28 May
16:00 (D/N)
Scorecard

| Kolkata Knight Riders; 163/8 (20 overs) | v | Kings XI Punjab; 135/8 (20 overs) |
| Robin Uthappa 42 (30); Karanveer Singh 3/40 (4 overs) | | Wriddhiman Saha 35 (31); Umesh Yadav 3/13 (4 overs) |

Kolkata Knight Riders won by 28 runs
Eden Gardens, Kolkata
Umpires: Nigel Llong (Eng) and S Ravi (Ind)
Player of the match: Umesh Yadav (KKR)

- Kings XI Punjab won the toss and elected to field.
- Match was postponed from 27 May 20:00 IST due to rain.

Eliminator
28 May
20:00 (D/N)
Scorecard

| Mumbai Indians; 173/8 (20 overs) | v | Chennai Super Kings; 176/3 (18.4 overs) |
| Lendl Simmons 67 (44); Mohit Sharma 3/42 (4 overs) | | Suresh Raina 54* (33); Harbhajan Singh 2/27 (4 overs) |

Chennai Super Kings won by 7 wickets
Brabourne Stadium, Mumbai
Umpires: Vineet Kulkarni (Ind) and Bruce Oxenford (Aus)
Player of the match: Suresh Raina (CSK)

- Chennai Super Kings won the toss and elected to field.

Qualifier 2
30 May
20:00 (D/N)
Scorecard

| Kings XI Punjab; 226/6 (20 overs) | v | Chennai Super Kings; 202/7 (20 overs) |
| Virender Sehwag 122 (58); Ashish Nehra 2/51 (4 overs) | | Suresh Raina 87 (25); Parvinder Awana 2/59 (4 overs) |

Kings XI Punjab won by 24 runs
Wankhede Stadium, Mumbai
Umpires: Kumar Dharmasena (SL) and Rod Tucker (Aus)
Player of the match: Virender Sehwag (KXIP)

- Chennai Super Kings won the toss and elected to field.
- Suresh Raina scored his runs at a strike rate of 348 which is the highest for any 50+ score in IPL.

=== Final ===
Final
1 June
20:00 (D/N)
Scorecard

| Kings XI Punjab; 199/4 (20 overs) | v | Kolkata Knight Riders; 200/7 (19.3 overs) |
| Wriddhiman Saha 115* (55); Piyush Chawla 2/44 (4 overs) | | Manish Pandey 94 (50); Karanveer Singh 4/54 (4 overs) |

Kolkata Knight Riders won by 3 wickets
M Chinnaswamy Stadium, Bangalore
Umpires: Kumar Dharmasena (SL) and Bruce Oxenford (Aus)
Player of the match: Manish Pandey (KKR)

- Kolkata Knight Riders won the toss and elected to field.
- Wriddhiman Saha became the first player to score a century in an IPL final.

== Statistics ==
=== Most runs ===
| Player | Team | Mat | Inns | Runs | HS |
|---|---|---|---|---|---|
| Robin Uthappa | Kolkata Knight Riders | 16 | 16 | 660 | 83* |
| Dwayne Smith | Chennai Super Kings | 16 | 16 | 566 | 79 |
| Glenn Maxwell | Kings XI Punjab | 16 | 16 | 552 | 95 |
| David Warner | Sunrisers Hyderabad | 14 | 14 | 528 | 90 |
| Suresh Raina | Chennai Super Kings | 16 | 16 | 523 | 87 |

- The player with the most runs at the end of the tournament received the Orange Cap.

=== Most wickets ===
| Player | Team | Mat | Inns | Wkts | BBI |
|---|---|---|---|---|---|
| Mohit Sharma | Chennai Super Kings | 16 | 16 | 23 | 4/14 |
| Sunil Narine | Kolkata Knight Riders | 16 | 16 | 21 | 4/20 |
| Bhuvneshwar Kumar | Sunrisers Hyderabad | 14 | 14 | 20 | 4/14 |
| Ravindra Jadeja | Chennai Super Kings | 16 | 16 | 19 | 4/12 |
| Shakib Al Hasan | Kolkata Knight Riders | 18 | 18 | 19 | 3/15 |

- The player with the most wickets at the end of the tournament received the Purple Cap.
