= 2014 in Delhi =

Events in the year 2014 in the capital city of India, Delhi

== Incumbents ==
Photo	Post	Name	Current Status
	(India) Chief Minister	Arvind Kejriwal	28 December 2013 – 14 February 2014 (Resigned)
	(India) Lieutenant Governor	Najeeb Jung	July 2013 – Present

== General Elections ==
=== Lok Sabha ===
Results for General elections to Lok Sabha was declared on 17 May 2014. Outcomes were as follows:

Party	Constituencies	Won
BJP	7	7
INC	0	0
AAP	0	0

== Events ==
=== January ===
- 13 January: Monsoon rains lash Delhi and NCR region.

=== February ===
- 14 February: Politician Arvind Kejriwal resigned from the post of Chief Minister.

=== May ===
- 3 May 2014: IPL 2014- Rajasthan Royals vs Delhi Daredevils was hosted.
- 5 May 2014: IPL 2014- Delhi Daredevils vs Chennai Super Kings 26th Match was hosted.
- 7 May 2014: IPL 2014- Delhi Daredevils vs Kolkata Knight Riders was hosted.
- 10 May 2014: IPL 2014- Delhi Daredevils vs Sunrisers Hyderabad was hosted.

=== July ===
- 11 July: Mango festival started in Delhi.
- 11 July: Delhi metro allocated Rs 3,470 cr fund in the Union Budget to complete the third phase of NCR lines.
- 12 July: Delhi became world's second most populous city.
- 15 July: Telecom Regulatory Authority of India (TRAI) Amendment Bill proposed by National Democratic Alliance (NDA) passed in parliament.
- 18 July - Finance Minister of India, Arun Jaitley proposed 2014 Delhi Budget in the parliament.
- 21 July - Air India launched direct flights between Delhi and Moscow.
- 22 July - First Internet de-addiction centre established in Delhi.
- 23 July - John Abraham inaugurated Toni and Guy outlet at New Delhi.

== See also ==
- 2015 in Delhi
