= Mehram nagar =

Village in South Delhi, India

Mehram Nagar
- Suburb
- Location in India
- Coordinates: 28°33′53″N 77°7′8″E
- Country: India
- State: Delhi
- District: New Delhi

Government
  - Body: Delhi Cantonment Board (DCB)

Languages
- Time zone: UTC+5:30 (IST)
- PIN: 110010
- Telephone code: 011
- Lok Sabha constituency: New Delhi
- Civic agency: Delhi Cantonment Board

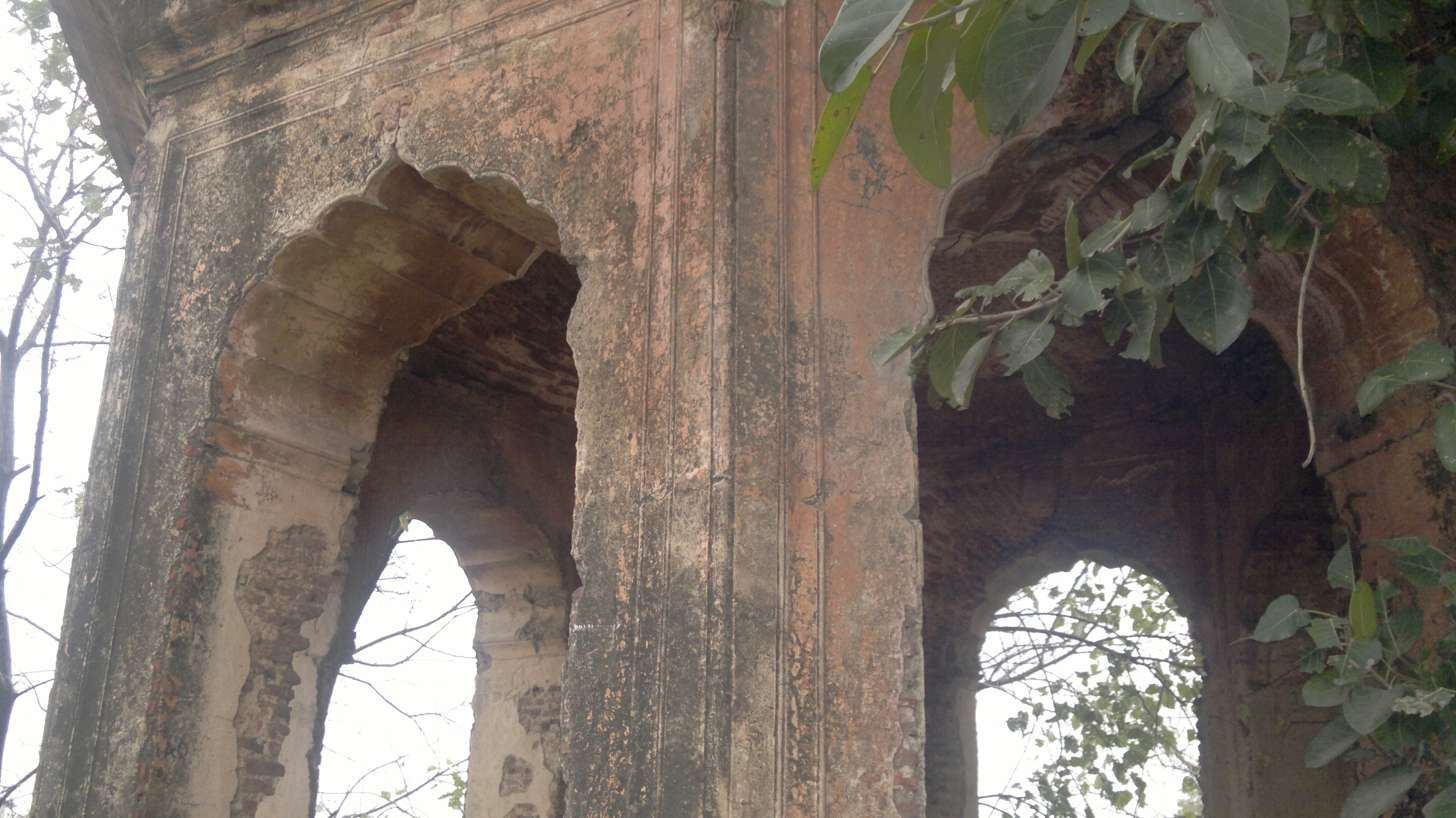
Ruins of pavilion at Mehram Serai near IGI Terminal-1.

Mehram Nagar is a 17th-century village in Delhi Cantt of the city of Delhi, India, located to the northeast of Terminal 1 of Indira Gandhi International Airport. Today the village is divided into two parts- West Mehram Nagar and East Mehram Nagar. Residents of the eastern part once lived on the land where Terminal 1 stands today.

== History ==
Mehram Nagar village, Mehram Bazaar and Mehram Serai were established in 1639 by a Mehram Khan, who was entrusted with overseeing the Mughal harem during the reign of Shah Jahan.

In the village, an Archaeological Survey of India board lists several historical monuments, including an old darwaza (gate), a mosque, and a serai, which were built by the Mughals, including Mehram Khan (harem keeper of Jahangir), Shah Jahan, and his son Aurangzeb, around 1660 CE.

== See also ==
- Tourism in Delhi
- Delhi Sultanate
- History of Delhi
- Timeline of Delhi
