= 2015 in Delhi =

Events in the year 2015 in the capital city of India, Delhi

== Incumbents ==
| Photo | Post | Name | Current Status |
|---|---|---|---|
| | (India) Chief Minister | Arvind Kejriwal | 14 February 2015 – present |
| | (India) Lieutenant Governor | Najeeb Jung | July 2013 – Present |

== General Elections ==
=== Legislative Assembly ===
2015 Delhi Legislative Assembly elections was declared on 10 February 2015.

| Emblem | Party | Constituencies | Won |
|---|---|---|---|
| | BJP | 70 | 3 |
| | INC | 70 | 0 |
| | AAP | 70 | 67 |

== Events ==
=== February ===
- 7 February : Legislative Assembly elections was held.
- 10 February : The results of the Legislative Assembly elections were announced.
- 14 February : Arvind Kejriwal became the chief minister of Delhi.

== See also ==
- 2014 in Delhi
