= Timeline of Delhi =

The following is a timeline of the history of Delhi, including New Delhi. Changes in ruling nation are in bold, with a flag to represent the country where available.

== Kuru Kingdom (1200 BCE–500 BCE) ==
- Territory came under the Kuru kingdom.

== Maurya Empire (300 BCE–100 BCE) ==
- Territory came under the Maurya Empire.

== Kushan Empire (1st–3rd century) ==
- Territory came under the Kushan Empire.

== Gupta Empire (3rd–6th century) ==
- Territory came under the Gupta Empire under the Yaudheya consortium.

== Gurjara-Pratihara Dynasty (7th century) ==
- Territory briefly came under the Gurjara-Pratihara dynasty.

== Tomara Rajput Dynasty (731–1160) ==
- 1052 – Lal Kot founded by Anangpal Tomar of the Tomara dynasty.

== Chahamanas of Shakambhari (1160–1206) ==
- c. 1160 – Chauhan Rajput rulers take Lal Kot from the Tomara Rajputs.
- 1180 – Lal Kot renamed to Rai Pithora.
- 1191 – First Battle of Tarain, the Rajputs under Prithviraj Chauhan defeated the Ghurid empire.
- 1192 – Second Battle of Tarain, Delhi sacked by Muhammad Ghori.

== Delhi Sultanate (1206–1526) ==
The Delhi Sultanate refers to 5 Muslim Kingdoms which were based mostly in Delhi for 320 years. They are:

- 1206–1290 – Early Turkish Rulers / Slave Dynasty or Mamluk Dynasty Qutb-ud-din Aibak becomes first Sultan of Delhi in 1206. Delhi is the capital.
- 1290–1320 – Khalji Dynasty Jalal-ud-din becomes first sultan of Khalji Dynasty in 1290
- 1320–1413 – Tughlaq Dynasty (1320–1413) Ghazi Malik ascended the throne under the title of Ghiyas-ud-din Tughlaq in 1320
- 1414–1451 – Sayyid Dynasty Khizr Khan ascended the throne in 1414
- 1451–1526 – Lodi Dynasty Bahlul Lodhi captured Delhi and became Sultan in 1451

== Mughal Empire (1526–1857) ==
- 1526 – Babur defeats Ibrahim Lodi in the Battle of Panipat, founding the Mughal Empire.
- 1530 – Babur dies; his son Humayun ascends the throne.
- 1540 – Humayun loses his empire to Sher Shah Suri.
- 1555 – Humayun regains the Mughal throne after Sher Shah's death.
- 1556 – Humayun dies; his son Akbar becomes emperor.
- 1605 – Akbar dies; his son Jahangir takes over.
- 1627 – Jahangir dies; Shah Jahan becomes emperor the following year.
- 1658 – Shah Jahan is imprisoned by his son Aurangzeb, who becomes emperor.
- 1707 – Aurangzeb dies, marking the beginning of the empire's decline.

1857 – The Mughal Empire officially ends after the Siege of Delhi; Bahadur Shah Zafar is exiled.

== Durrani Empire (1752–1764) ==
- 1752 – Delhi became a protectorate state of Durrani Empire.
- 1761 – Durranis defeated Marathas in Third Battle of Panipat. The Mughal Emperor became vassal ruler and paid tributes to the Durranis.

== Maratha Empire (1757–1803) ==
- 1757 – Maratha Empire: Battle Of Delhi (1757), Marathas defeat Rohilla Pathans and capture the area surrounding Delhi.
- 1771 – Delhi is captured by Mahadji Shinde and the emperor paid tribute to Marathas.

== Sikh Misls (1765–1799) ==
- 1764 – Jats and Sikhs lay siege to Delhi for several months and defeat Rohillas.
- 1768 – After defeating Najib-ud-Daulah, Sikhs marched into Delhi.
- 1783 – Sikhs defeat the Mughals at the outskirts of Delhi and capture the Red Fort. Sikhs controlled the capital for a year where the Mughal emperor paid 37.5 percent of the tax revenue.

== British Empire (1803–1947) ==
- 1803 – Company Rule: Battle of Delhi between the Marathas and British East Indian Company.
- 1804 – Siege of Delhi by Marathas.
- 1857 – Indian Rebellion of 1857 begins in several cities, including Delhi.
- 1858 – **British Raj**
- 1911 – New Delhi is founded and is proclaimed the future capital of the British Raj.
- 1931 – New Delhi becomes the capital of the British Raj. New governmental quarter of Delhi inaugurated by architect Edwin Lutyens. It is called Lutyens' Delhi.

== India (1947–present) ==
- 1947 – Dominion of India: New Delhi becomes the capital of India.
- 1950 – **India**
- 1951 – Delhi hosts the Asian Games.
- 1956 – Delhi is made into a Union Territory.
- 1982 – Delhi hosts the Asian Games.
- 1985 - National Capital Region Planning Board Act of 1985 passed
- 1991 – Delhi is formally made into a National Capital Territory.
- 1993 – Madan Lal Khurana becomes Delhi's first Chief Minister since the re-establishment of the office.
- 1996 – Lajpat Nagar Market Blast kills 13 people and injures 39.
- 1998
  - Sushma Swaraj becomes Delhi's first female Chief Minister, and is succeeded by Sheila Dikshit.
- 2001
  - 13 December: 2001 Indian Parliament attack takes place.
  - Population: 13,782,976
- 2002
  - Delhi hosts the 2002 United Nations Climate Change Conference.
  - Delhi Metro begins operation.
- 2005 – Delhi bombings kill 62 people and injure at least 210.
- 2008 – More than 35 killed and 150 injured during the 13 September 2008 Delhi bombings and 27 September 2008 Delhi bombings.
- 2010 – Delhi hosts the Commonwealth Games
- 2011 – Population: 16,753,235
- 2011 – At least 15 people are killed and 79 injured in the 2011 Delhi bombing.
- 2012
  - 13 February: 2012 attacks on Israeli diplomats in Delhi, part of the Iran–Israel proxy conflict.
  - 29 March: 4th BRICS summit takes place.
- 2014
  - 14 February: Politician Arvind Kejriwal resigns from the post of Chief Minister.
- 2015
  - 7 February: Aam Aadmi Party wins the 2015 Delhi Legislative Assembly election.
- 2019
  - Shaheen Bagh Protests oppose the passage of the Citizenship (Amendment) Act, 2019.
  - 8 December: 2019 Delhi factory fire.
- 2020
  - 5 January: 2020 Jawaharlal Nehru University attack occurs, with the attackers unknown.
  - 8 February: Aam Aadmi Party wins the 2020 Delhi Legislative Assembly election.
  - 23 February–29 February: 2020 Delhi riots incur communal violence in response to the Shaheen Bagh protest.
  - 2 March: The COVID-19 pandemic in Delhi begins, soon leading to a lockdown.
  - 30 November: Ten thousand farmers from different states of India (including Punjab, Haryana and Uttar Pradesh) arrived at the outskirts of New Delhi to mark protest against deregulation rules.
- 2021
  - 26 January: 2021 Indian farmers' Republic Day protest.
  - 29 January: Israeli Embassy in Delhi is attacked with Iran refuting allegations of purporting the attack.
- 2022
  - 13 May: 2022 Delhi fire.
  - 4 December: Aam Aadmi Party wins the unified 2022 Delhi Municipal Corporation election.
- 2023
  - 9 to 10 September: 2023 G20 New Delhi summit.
  - 13 December: 2023 Indian Parliament breach.
- 2024
  - 21 September: AAP's Atishi Marlena becomes Chief Minister of Delhi after the Arrest of Arvind Kejriwal.
- 2025
  - 5 February: Bharatiya Janata Party wins the 2025 Delhi Legislative Assembly election.
  - 10 November: 2025 Delhi car explosion.
