= Manan Vohra =

Indian cricketer

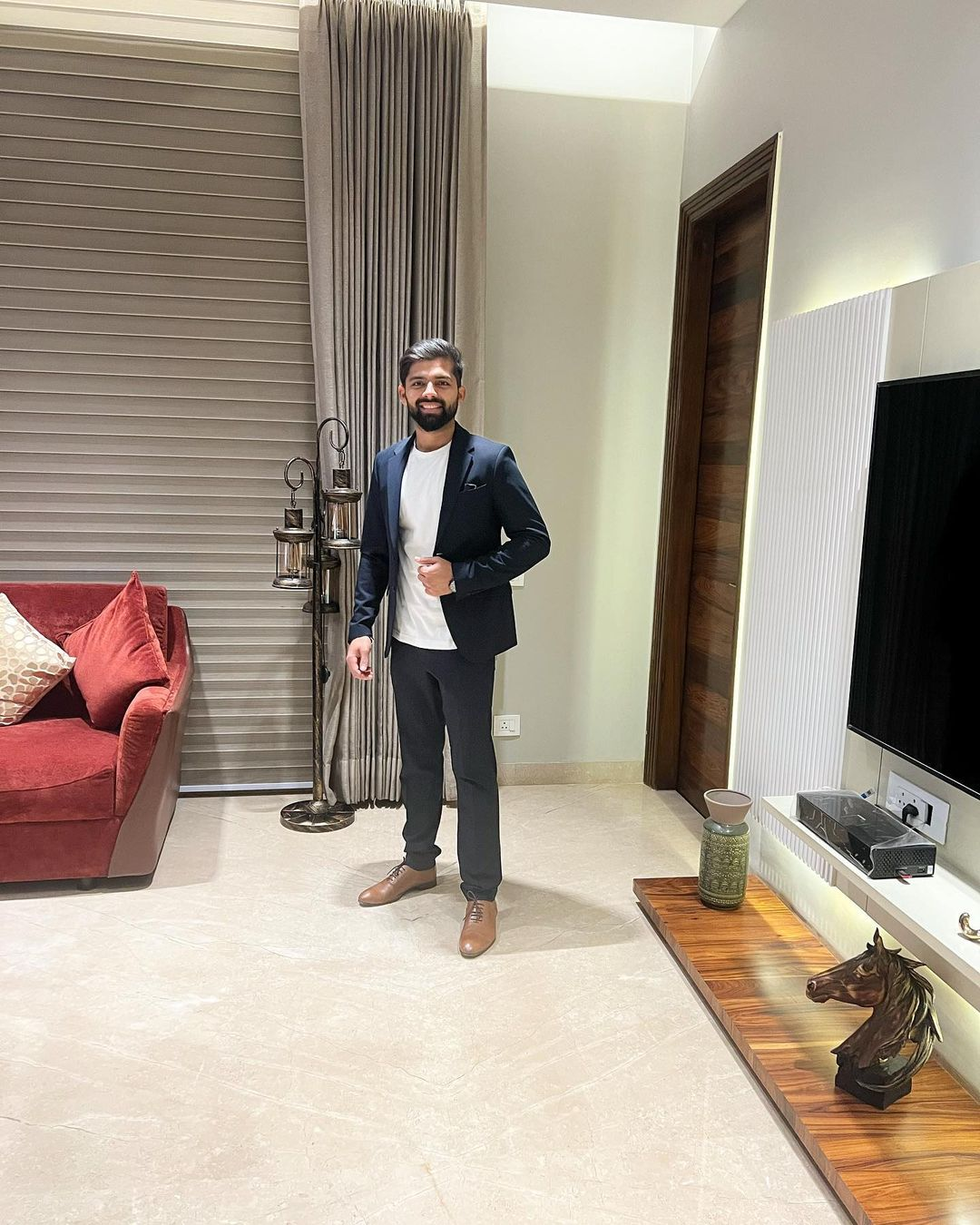

Personal information
- Born: 18 July 1993 (age 33); Chandigarh, India
- Batting: Right-handed
- Bowling: Right arm fast-medium
- Role: Batsman

Domestic team information
- Years: Team
- 2011–2018: Punjab
- 2013–2017: Kings XI Punjab (squad no. 36)
- 2018: Royal Challengers Bangalore (squad no. 36)
- 2019 -present: Chandigarh
- 2021: Rajasthan Royals (squad no. 36)
- 2022–2023: Lucknow Super Giants

Career statistics
Competition	FC	LA	T20
Matches	40	56	106
Runs scored	2,386	1,854	2,832
Batting average	37.87	34.98	28.89
100s/50s	7/11	5/10	1/16
Top score	224	143	104*
Balls bowled	36	6	–
Wickets	0	1	–
Bowling average	–	13.00	–
5 wickets in innings	–	0	–
10 wickets in match	–	0	–
Best bowling	–	1/13	–
Catches/stumpings	19/–	15/–	31/–
- Source: ESPNcricinfo, 23 August 2022

Manan Vohra (born 18 July 1993) is an Indian cricketer. He has previously played for the India Under-19 cricket team and most recently has played in the Indian Premier League.

== Early life ==
Manan is the son of Sanjeev Vohra, and the grandson of former Indian hockey player Y.P Singh, who is now the general secretary of Chandigarh Hockey Association. It was the encouragement from his grandfather that Manan decided to take up cricket. Manan used to practice cricket at his school, Guru Nanak Public School, Sector 36, Chandigarh. He also studied at Hansraj Public School, Satluj Public School and Bhavan Vidyalaya sector 27, Chandigarh. Manan made it to the India U13 squad for the Sharjah Cup in 2004. He is a fan of Sachin Tendulkar. Manan's coach at the junior level was Harminder Singh. Now he is coached by Yograj Singh who is the father of Yuvraj Singh.

== Career ==
He has been a part of the Punjab U16, U19 and U22 sides. He also participated in the Dhruve Pandove Trophy. He was made the captain of the Punjab U19 team. He led his team in winning the Vinoo Mankad Trophy. Manan single-handedly led the Chandigarh challenge in the U22 tournament and hit knocks of 108, 129 and 179, He was drafted in the Punjab Ranji camp in 2008. He was selected for the U-19 NCA camp which was held in 2011 in Bangalore. He was also included in the India U19 team that participated in the Quadrangular Series which was held in Vishakhapatnam. The other 3 teams were the U19 teams from Sri Lanka, West Indies and Australia. Manan scored 79 off 35 balls and was studded with 15 fours and two sixes against Australia U19. Manan replaced Punjab wicketkeeper-batsman, Gitansh Khera in the Ranji Trophy 2011–12 season. He made his List A debut on 27 February 2014, for Punjab in the 2013–14 Vijay Hazare Trophy.

== Indian Premier League ==
Vohra debuted in the IPL in April 2013 as a player for Kings XI Punjab and impressed with an unbeaten 43 runs off 26 balls. He made 67 runs in the 2014 IPL final and his 129 run partnership with Wriddhiman Saha ensured that Kings XI Punjab made 199 runs in 20 overs. On 17 April 2017, he hit 95 runs off just 50 balls, including 9 fours and 5 sixes, against the Sunrisers Hyderabad in Hyderabad. However, his team lost by 5 runs.

In January 2018, he was bought by the Royal Challengers Bangalore in the 2018 IPL auction. In December 2018, he was bought by the Rajasthan Royals in the player auction for the 2019 Indian Premier League.

In February 2022, he was bought by the Lucknow Super Giants in the auction for the 2022 Indian Premier League tournament.
