= 2014 Budget of Delhi =

2014 Delhi Budget
- Emblem of India
- Submitted: 18 July 2014
- Submitted by: Arun Jaitley
- Country: India
- Parliament: Lok Sabha
- Party: BJP
- Finance minister: Finance Minister
- Total expenditures: INR 36766 crore
- Website: www.indiabudget.nic.in

The Budget of Delhi, India for 2014–2015 was presented by Arun Jaitley the Finance Minister of India on 18 July 2014 in Lok Sabha. The total Budget estimate for the Government of NCT of Delhi for the year 2014-15 is Rs. 36766 crore (equivalent to US$6 billion).

== Salient features of the budget ==
- Power subsidy for the consumers with fair use of electricity.
- Rs 700 crore allocated to improve the power transmission and water distribution system.
- Rs 500 crore proposed for the reform in the water sector.
- Rs 200 crore proposed for reform in the power sector.
- Multi-speciality hospital in Rohini.

== Budget 2014: Highlights of Finance Minister Arun Jaitley’s Budget speech ==
- Rs. 260 crore allocated for the power subsidy in Delhi.
- Multi-specialty hospital to be established in Rohini region of Delhi.
- Numbers of Night Centers to be increased.
- Four new sewage treatment plants will be set up.
- Community toilets to be set up in JJ clusters
- News buses up to 1,380 to be provided by DTC.
- Pension scheme extend from 3.90 lakh people to 4.30 lakh people
- 20 New government girl schools to be opened.
- 110 new ambulance number to be increased in view of cases in Delhi.
