= Karanveer Singh =

Indian cricketer (born 1987)

Personal information
- Born: 8 November 1987 (age 39); Chandigarh, Punjab, India
- Batting: Right-handed
- Bowling: Right-arm legbreak & googly
- Role: Bowler

Domestic team information
- Years: Team
- 2007–2009: Chandigarh Lions
- 2009–2017: Himachal Pradesh
- 2014–2015: Kings XI Punjab
- T20 debut: 28 March 2013 Himachal Pradesh v Services
- Source: CricketArchive, 10 May 2025

Karanveer Singh (born 8 November 1987 Chandigarh, Punjab) is an Indian cricketer, who has played in the IPL and Champions League Twenty20 for Kings XI Punjab.
