= Wriddhiman Saha =

Indian cricketer

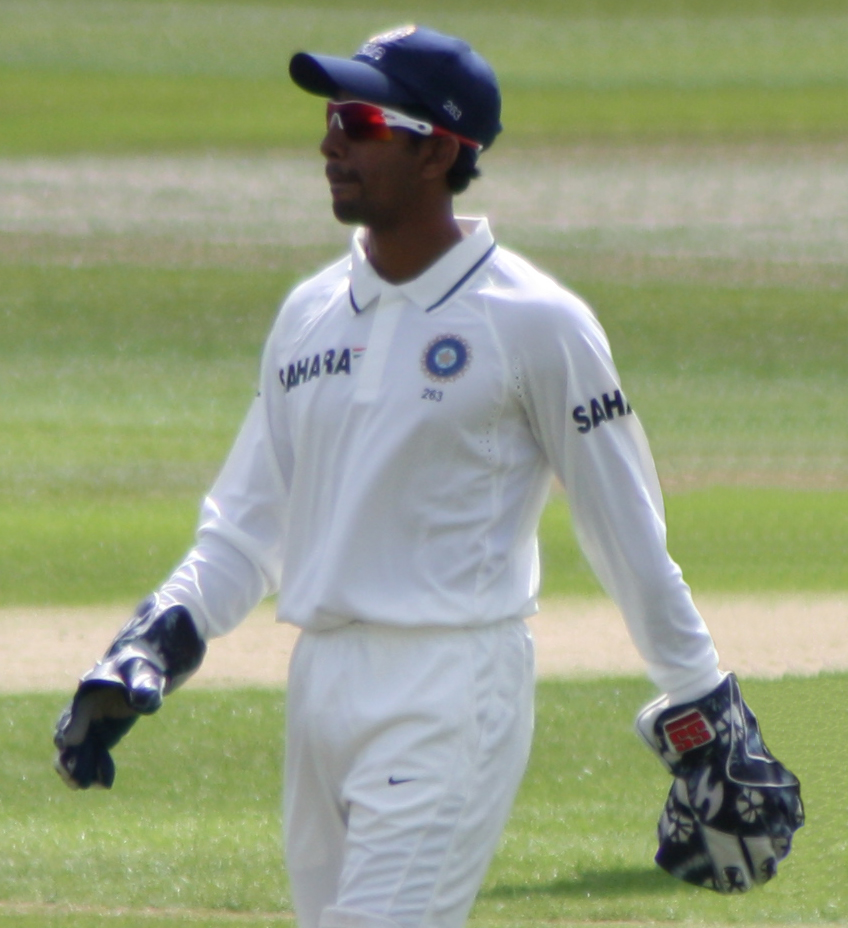

Personal information
- Full name: Wriddhiman Prasanta Saha
- Born: 24 October 1984 (age 42); Siliguri, West Bengal, India
- Nickname: Wriddhi, Superman, Papali, Stitches, Sahasi
- Batting: Right-handed
- Bowling: Right-arm off-spin
- Role: Wicket-keeper, batsman

International information
- National side: India (2010–2021)
- Test debut (cap 263): 6 February 2010 v South Africa
- Last Test: 3 December 2021 v New Zealand
- ODI debut (cap 190): 28 November 2010 v New Zealand
- Last ODI: 2 November 2014 v Sri Lanka
- ODI shirt no.: 24

Domestic team information
- Years: Team
- 2007–2022; 2024-2025: Bengal
- 2008–2010: Kolkata Knight Riders
- 2011–2013: Chennai Super Kings (squad no. 6)
- 2014–2017: Kings XI Punjab (squad no. 6)
- 2018–2021: Sunrisers Hyderabad
- 2022–2024: Gujarat Titans
- 2022–2024: Tripura

Career statistics
Competition	Test	ODI	FC	LA
Matches	40	9	142	116
Runs scored	1,353	41	7,169	3,072
Batting average	29.41	13.67	41.43	40.42
100s/50s	3/6	0/0	14/44	3/20
Top score	117	16	203*	116
Catches/stumpings	92/12	17/1	346/38	138/18
Medal record
Men's Cricket
Representing India
World Test Championship
Runner-up	2019-2021
- Source: ESPNcricinfo, 30 May 2022

Wriddhiman Saha (born 24 October 1984) is a former Indian cricketer who played for the national cricket team. He is the former first-class wicket-keeper of the Bengal cricket team. He was the first cricketer to score a century in an Indian Premier League final.

Saha made his Test debut in February 2010, as a specialist batsman. He scored his maiden Test century at St. Lucia on a tour of the Caribbean. He was named man of the match in the 3rd series. He announced his retirement from all forms of cricket prior to the 2024–25 Ranji Trophy season, which he said would be his last tournament.

== Domestic career ==
Saha played for the Under-19s and the Under-22s team before being promoted to first-class cricket. Saha made his one-day debut in the Ranji Trophy competition of 2006/07, against Assam. He scored a duck in his debut innings in the following match. Nearing the end of his brief run in the Ranji Trophy, he played three one-day games for the East Zone in the Deodhar Trophy.

Saha made his first-class debut in the 2007–08 Ranji Trophy, against Hyderabad, where he scored 111 not out. Saha also made the East Zone team in the Duleep Trophy in the 2007–08 season.

Saha's century for Bengal on his Ranji debut landed him a contract with IPL for the Kolkata Knight Riders in 2008.

Saha was named in the India A squad which played three limited-overs matches against the Israel Invitational XI, where he was selected on the basis of his performance in the Indian Premier League. India A won the series 3–0. Saha scored an unbeaten 85 in the third match in which India chased 235.

Saha also has a record of making the fastest century in domestic cricket. He scored 102 runs of just 20 balls at a strike rate of 510 with 4 fours and 14 sixes in 2018.

Saha also has records with KT, joining in 2011, at the WBC League. He captained the team from 2011 to 2013. KT won its 2nd title in 2012 under his captaincy. In WBC 2015, he scored 2 centuries and 4 half-centuries after he was retained by KT in the 2015 WBC Mega Auction. He scored his LA highest score in 2017, which was 154 (118) in the 65-over WBC League 2017. In the 2021 Mumbai WBC, he scored 150 (123) vs CBST. His fastest 50 in the WBC was 54 (18).

== International career ==
=== Test career ===
On 28 January 2010, Saha was included in the Indian Test squad as a reserve wicket-keeper in place of Dinesh Karthik for the upcoming home Test match series against South Africa.

As Saha was a reserve gloveman, he was not expected to play, but V. V. S. Laxman failed to recover from injury and Rohit Sharma, the only reserve specialist batsman in the squad, injured himself playing football in the warm-up on the first morning. As another batsman could not be flown in on time, Saha was given his Test debut against South Africa.

He scored a duck in the first innings, but scored 36 in the second innings. In both innings, fast bowler Dale Steyn took his wicket. India lost the Test, and Saha was dropped from the squad for the second Test, which India subsequently won to level the two-match series.

Saha played in the fourth match of the Border–Gavaskar Trophy in January 2012 in place of MS Dhoni, who was banned for slow over rate, where he made 35 runs in the first Test, which helped Virat Kohli get his maiden Test Century.

He also toured South Africa in December 2013, New Zealand in February 2014 and England in July 2014 as part of the Test squad but did not get a game.

On 9 December 2014, he was selected to play his first test match since January 2012 against Australia, at the same ground where he had played his last match, because MS Dhoni was out with a thumb injury. He made 25 runs in the first innings and 13 runs in the second innings. He also played in the fourth match of the series and made 35 runs.

In 2015, he was selected for India's Tour of Bangladesh and Sri Lanka for Test matches. He scored 2 fifties in 2 test matches he played in Sri Lanka. He also played in tests of Gandhi-Mandela Freedom Trophy 2015.

In 2016, he was selected for India's tour of West Indies as a wicket-keeper. In the first Test against West Indies, Saha became the third wicket-keeper in Indian cricket history to feature in six dismissals in a Test innings. He scored twin fifties at Eden Gardens, his home ground, in October 2016 to get his first man of the match award. He was also selected for 5 match Test series against England in India but played only in the 1st and 2nd matches, and was out of the rest of the series due to injury.

He scored his 2nd Test hundred against Bangladesh in a one-off test in February 2017.

On 19 March 2017, Saha scored a century at JSCA International Stadium against Australia, making 117 off 233 balls, which included 8 fours and 1 six. India were 328/6, which was 123 behind Australia's first innings total of 451 when he came to bat and added 199 for the seventh wicket with Cheteshwar Pujara.

On 8 January 2018, against South Africa Saha became the first wicket-keeper for India to take ten catches in a single Test. Later on he got injured in that series and did not play the final match. India lost that series 2–1. He suffered a hamstring injury in South Africa but still played in the 2018 IPL, which worsened his injury. He was not selected for 5 Test match series in India's tour of England in 2018 due to his injury, and he was replaced by Rishabh Pant . Pant's good performances made Saha out of the team, and he was not selected for India's tour of Australia in 2018–19. Later on, after recovering from injuries, he was part of the India A team that toured the West Indies in 2019.

Saha played in the 3-match Test series against South Africa in India in 2019 and took many magical catches. In November 2019, in the second Test against Bangladesh, Saha became the fifth wicket-keeper for India to affect 100 dismissals in Test cricket. In January 2020, Saha was selected for 2 Test Series in New Zealand but did not play any match. In December 2020, he was selected for 4 Test Match series in Australia and played only in the first Test, scoring 9 in the first innings and 4 in the second innings. He was dropped for the next match. He substituted Rishabh Pant in the 3rd Innings of the 3rd match and helped Navdeep Saini get his first Test wicket. He stayed on the bench for the whole series against England in February–March 2021. He was selected in India's Squad for the WTC Final and India's Tour of England 2021 but did not feature in the playing 11.

In November, 2021, Saha was selected as the first-choice wicketkeeper in the two-match test series between India and New Zealand. Despite suffering a neck injury during the first test, Saha scored an unbeaten 61 runs during the second innings of the match, which earned him praise from critics. His 200 from 221 balls in Test cricket vs Eng in 2018 and 148 in 123 balls in ODI vs SL also gave him confidence. His lowest ODI score – 6* (10), in an ODI vs SL in 2014, in the same series, added 6 runs to India's 404/5, for Rohit's 264 (173).

=== ODI career ===
He made his ODI debut against New Zealand in 2010 in 5 ODI series and played in the first 3 matches. After scoring 115 runs in the 2014 IPL final, he was called to tour Bangladesh as part of the 15-man squad for 3 ODIs against Bangladesh Cricket Team but did not bat well. The same year, he was again selected to the ODI team for 5 matches against Sri Lanka after MS Dhoni, the first-choice keeper and captain, was out due to a thumb injury. He played in the first 3 matches but was dropped for the 4th and 5th matches. Since then, he has never returned to the ODI Team.

== Indian Premier League ==
Saha played for Kolkata Knight Riders in the first three seasons of the IPL, but in 2011 he was picked by Chennai Super Kings as a reserve wicketkeeper for MS Dhoni. He also represented the Chennai Super Kings in 2012 and 2013. In the 2014 IPL Auction, Saha was purchased by Kings XI Punjab as a specialist wicketkeeper. In the tournament, Saha not only took some good catches but also contributed with the bat. He made 362 runs at an average of 32.90 and a strike rate of 145.38.

In the IPL Final against Kolkata Knight Riders, Saha became the first player to score a hundred in an IPL final when he made an unbeaten 115 runs from 55 balls, including 10 fours and 8 sixes. However, despite his feat, his team eventually lost the match.

In December 2018, he was bought by the Sunrisers Hyderabad in the player auction for the 2019 Indian Premier League. In 2020 season, he only played 4 matches and scored 214 run with a 70+ average including 2 brilliant half centuries as an opener of Sunrisers Hyderabad. In the 2021 Season, playing in 9 matches, he scored 131 runs with an average of 14.55 and a strike rate of 93.57. He was released by Sunrisers Hyderabad ahead of the IPL 2022 auction. In February 2022, he was bought by the Gujarat Titans in the auction for the 2022 Indian Premier League tournament. He played there until his retirement in 2024

== Personal life ==
Saha is from Siliguri. In 2011, he married Romi Saha; the couple have two children.

In 2022, he revealed that a journalist had bullied and threatened him. A BCCI committee investigated the claims and the journalist, Boria Majumdar, was banned for two years from interviewing any cricketer.

== Retirement Life ==
He retired on 1 February 2025, with his final match being a Ranji Trophy match for Bengal against Punjab, in which Bengal won by an innings and 13 runs.
