= Parvinder Awana =

Indian former first-class cricketer

Personal information
- Full name: Parvinder Awana
- Born: 19 July 1986 (age 40); Noida, Uttar Pradesh, India
- Batting: Right-handed
- Role: Bowler

International information
- National side: India
- T20I debut (cap 44): 20 December 2012 v England
- Last T20I: 22 December 2012 v England
- T20I shirt no.: 43

Domestic team information
- Years: Team
- 2007/08–present: Delhi
- 2012–2015: Kings XI Punjab (squad no. 34)

Career statistics
Competition	FC	LA	T20I
Matches	62	44	2
Runs scored	662	34	–
Batting average	12.25	5.66	–
100s/50s	0/2	0/0	–
Top score	74	12	–
Balls bowled	10,360	2,076	36
Wickets	191	63	0
Bowling average	29.23	26.46	–
5 wickets in innings	10	1	–
10 wickets in match	1	0	–
Best bowling	6/84	6/49	–
Catches/stumpings	13/–	8/–	0/–
- Source: ESPNcricinfo, 8 April 2023

Parvinder Awana (born 19 July 1986) is an Indian former first-class cricketer who played for Delhi in domestic cricket. He is a right-arm medium pace bowler. He was picked in the national squad for the fourth Test against England and made his Twenty20 International debut against the touring English side on 21 December 2012. In July 2018, he retired from all forms of cricket.

== Domestic career ==
Awana made his first-class debut for Delhi against Himachal Pradesh in 2007. He played five games that season and picked up 12 wickets. He impressed in the next season, picking up 28 wickets from 7 matches at an average of 24. He also got two five-wicket hauls and a ten-for that season. He was dropped from the team during the 2010/11 Ranji Trophy as he failed to get enough wickets. However, he had a highly impressive first-class season in 2011/12. He had 35 scalps to his name from just 7 matches at an average of 25, picking three five-fors. His good bowling was rewarded as he was selected to play for North Zone in the 2011/12 Deodhar Trophy. He continued his brilliant bowling in the one-day format too, as he got figures of 6/49 against Central Zone in the only match he played that tournament before joining the Kings XI Punjab squad for IPL 2012. He took most wickets in the 2011–12 Vijay Hazare Trophy, India's domestic 50 over tournament.

== International career ==
He was picked in the national squad for the fourth Test against England and made his Twenty20 International debut against the touring English side in December 2012.
